= 2026 Bromley London Borough Council election =

2026 English local government election

- 7 May 2026

All 58 seats to Bromley London Borough Council 30 seats needed for a majority
- Registered: 247,833
- Turnout: 123,119; 49.7%

	First party	Second party	Third party
Leader	Colin Smith	Simon Jeal	Alan Cook
Party	Conservative	Labour	Reform UK
Leader's seat	Bickley and Sundridge	Penge and Cator	Bromley Common and Holwood (lost seat)
Last election	36 seats, 41.6%	12 seats, 32.0%	0 seats, 0.2%
Seats before	34	11	3
Seats won	35	8	6
Seat change	▼1	▼4	▲6
Percentage	36%	17%	21%
	Fourth party	Fifth party
Leader	Chloe-Jane Ross	Mark Smith
Party	Liberal Democrats	Chislehurst Matters
Leader's seat	Beckenham Town and Copers Cope	Chislehurst
Last election	5 seats, 18.2%	3 seats, 3.3%
Seats before	5	3
Seats won	6	3
Seat change	▲1	Steady
Percentage	11%	3%
- Map of the results of the 2026 Bromley London Borough Council election. Chislehurst Matters in green, Conservatives in dark blue, Labour in red, Liberal Democrats in orange, Reform in light blue.
Leader before election
Colin Smith
Conservative
Leader after election
Colin Smith
Conservative

The 2026 Bromley London Borough Council election took place on 7 May 2026. All 58 members of Bromley London Borough Council were elected. The elections took place alongside local elections in the other London boroughs and elections to local authorities across the United Kingdom.

In the election, the incumbent Conservatives retained their control of the council, losing seats to the Liberal Democrats and Reform UK. Despite some expectations, Reform did not make expected gains, and their leader, Alan Cook, lost his seat. Labour lost seats to Reform and the Conservatives.

== Background ==
In July 2025, Reform UK won their first seat in London at a local by-election in the Bromley Common and Holwood ward. This success, as well as the defection of Conservative councillors Christopher Marlow (Farnborough and Crofton) and Kira Gabbert (Bickley and Sundridge), led Reform to expect large gains in the Borough.

== Previous council composition ==
Before 2026 election		After 2026 election	
Party	Seats	Party	Seats
Conservative	33	Conservative	35
Labour	11	Labour	8
Reform	3	Reform	6
Liberal Democrats	5	Liberal Democrats	6
Chislehurst Matters	3	Chislehurst Matters	3
Independent	2	Independent	0
Vacant	1	Vacant	NA

Changes 2022–2026:

- August 2023: Jonathan Laidlaw (Conservative) leaves party to sit as an independent
- October 2023: Andrew Lee (Conservative) dies – by-election held December 2023
- December 2023: Josh Coldspring-White (Conservative) wins by-election
- March 2024: Aisha Cuthbert (Conservative) resigns – by-election held May 2024
- May 2024: Gemma Turrell (Conservative) wins by-election
- June 2025: Jonathan Laidlaw (Independent) dies – by-election held July 2025
- July 2025: Alan Cook (Reform) gains by-election from Conservatives
- October 2025: Christopher Marlow (Conservative) joins Reform
- November 2025:
  - Alisa Igoe (Labour) leaves party to sit as an independent
  - Sophie Dunbar (Independent) joins Conservatives
- December 2025:
  - Keith Onslow (Conservative) dies – seat left vacant until 2026 election
  - Kira Gabbert (Conservative) joins Reform

== Election results ==
Council composition after the 2024 election

Council composition after the 2026 election

2026 Bromley London Borough Council election
Party	Candidates	Seats	Gains	Losses	Net gain/loss	Seats %	Votes %	Votes	+/−
Conservative	58	35	2	3	▼1	60.34	36.17	119,341	▼4.43
Labour	58	8	0	4	▼4	13.79	16.96	55,939	▼15.04
Reform	58	6	6	0	▲6	10.35	20.54	67,752	▲20.34
Liberal Democrats	58	6	1	0	▲1	10.35	10.86	35,824	▼7.34
Chislehurst Matters	3	3	0	0	Steady	5.17	3.24	10,696	Steady
Green	45	0	0	0	Steady	0.00	11.87	39,175	▲8.57
Better Bromley	3	0	0	0	Steady	0.00	0.19	611	NEW
Independent	1	0	0	2	▼2	0.00	0.17	569	▼1.43

== Ward results ==
Statements of persons nominated were published on 10 April 2026. Incumbent councillors are marked with an asterisk (*)

=== Beckenham Town & Copers Cope ===
Beckenham Town & Copers Cope (3 seats)
Party	Candidate	Votes	%	±%
Liberal Democrats	Chloe-Jane Ross*	2,257	36.8%	−0.1
Liberal Democrats	Gita Bapat	2,043	33.3%	−0.9
Liberal Democrats	Steven Jefferies	2,042	33.3%	+1.1
Conservative	Michael Tickner*	1,825	29.8%	−4.5
Conservative	Stephen Ayshford	1,753	28.6%	−4.9
Conservative	Patrick Olliffe	1,652	27.0%	−5.6
Green	Ruth Fabricant	869	14.1%	+3.5
Labour	Anna-Marie Blewer	858	14.0%	−15.0
Green	Geoff Newman	835	13.6%	New
Labour	Mike Brown	721	11.8%	−13.3
Green	Mark Phillippo	704	11.5%	New
Reform	Steve Walker	769	12.5%	New
Reform	Melody Whelan	724	11.8%	New
Reform	Dave Wibberley	687	11.2%	New
Labour	Sebastian Crisp	645	10.5%	−13.7
Turnout		6,234	50.1%	+7.1
Registered electors		12,441		
Liberal Democrats hold		Swing		
Liberal Democrats gain from Conservative		Swing		
Liberal Democrats hold		Swing		

=== Bickley & Sundridge ===
Mark Brock was a sitting councillor in West Wickham, elected in 2022.

Bickley & Sundridge (3 seats)
Party	Candidate	Votes	%	±%
Conservative	Mark Brock	3,666	53.5%	+2.8
Conservative	Kate Lymer*	3,564	52.0%	+0.4
Conservative	Colin Smith*	3,474	50.7%	−0.4
Reform	Michael Ellery	1,210	17.7%	New
Reform	John Evans	1,160	16.9%	New
Reform	Adrian Lawrence	1,103	16.1%	New
Green	Cecilia Broderick	1,041	15.2%	+0.1
Green	Charles Mulvihill	806	11.8%	New
Labour	Gary Dixson	695	10.1%	−13.7
Green	Denis Tyurenkov	688	10.0%	New
Liberal Democrats	Martin Cooper	680	9.9%	−7.9
Labour	Robert Evans	662	9.7%	−−13.1
Liberal Democrats	Robert Cliff	653	9.5%	−9.7
Labour	Kyle Sewell	625	9.1%	−13.4
Liberal Democrats	Jon Webber	538	7.8%	−7.6
Turnout		7,001	51.3%	+12.3
Registered electors		13,644		
Conservative hold		Swing		
Conservative hold		Swing		
Conservative hold		Swing		

=== Biggin Hill ===
Biggin Hill (2 seats)
Party	Candidate	Votes	%	±%
Reform	Steve James	2,122	47.4%	New
Reform	Tim Allitt	2,119	47.3%	New
Conservative	Sophie Dunbar*	1,766	39.4%	−2.4
Conservative	Philip Hatch	1,440	32.2%	−1.6
Green	Geoff Allen	327	7.3%	New
Liberal Democrats	Geoff Gostt	299	6.7%	−4.7
Green	Laurence Hamilton	270	6.0%	New
Labour	Steve Cranenburgh	230	5.1%	−4.7
Liberal Democrats	Malcolm Westbrook	206	4.6%	−3.5
Labour	Aji George	178	4.0%	−3.3
Turnout		4,558	54.0%	+17
Registered electors		8,447		
Reform gain from Independent		Swing		
Reform gain from Independent		Swing		

=== Bromley Common & Holwood ===
†Kira Gabbert was a sitting councillor in Bickley and Sundridge, elected as a Conservative before her defection in December 2025 Alan Cook was elected following a by-election in Bromley Common and Holwood and subsequently lost re-election.

Bromley Common and Holwood (3 seats)
Party	Candidate	Votes	%	±%
Conservative	Ian Payne	2,522	39.0%	−8.1
Conservative	Sunil Gupta*	2,514	38.9%	−4.0
Conservative	Simon Innes	2,391	37.0%	−5.9
Reform	Alan Cook*	1946	30.1%	New
Reform	Kira Gabbert†	1824	28.2%	New
Reform	Alfie Stokes	1747	27.0%	New
Green	Clare Searle	984	15.2%	−1.3
Green	Geraldine Ker	950	14.7%	New
Green	Louis Goddard-Glen	927	14.3%	New
Labour	Shona Moses	755	11.7%	−21.1
Labour	Michael Simms	692	10.7%	−17.7
Labour	Sobia Zubair	629	9.7%	−17.1
Liberal Democrats	Alan Carter	553	8.5%	−9.6
Liberal Democrats	Clive Broadhurst	544	8.4%	−9.3
Liberal Democrats	Andrew Viner	430	6.6%	−5.9
Turnout		6624	47.1%	+15.1
Registered electors		14,064		
Conservative hold		Swing		
Conservative hold		Swing		
Conservative gain from Reform		Swing		

=== Bromley Town ===
Bromley Town (3 seats)
Party	Candidate	Votes	%	±%
Liberal Democrats	Julie Ireland*	1,943	38.1	6.7
Liberal Democrats	Graeme Casey*	1,873	36.8	5.7
Liberal Democrats	Sam Webber*	1,752	34.4	−8.2
Conservative	Oliver Cameron	1402	27.5	−6.8
Conservative	Max English-Sayers	1297	25.5	−7.7
Conservative	Tristan Lee	1253	24.6	−8.3
Green	Rose-Marie Billington	878	17.2	+5.3
Reform	Colin Clements	773	15.2	New
Reform	Joshua Collins	738	14.5	New
Reform	Charmain Senior	684	13.4	New
Green	Arturs Bilmanis	676	13.3	New
Labour	Marie Bardsley	566	11.1	−6.0
Labour	Larry Awobayiku	479	9.4	−7.3
Labour	Owen Wittekind	362	7.1	−8.0
Better Bromley	Carol Denyer	328	6.4	New
Better Bromley	Caroline Ibukun	152	3.0	New
Better Bromley	Sum Thiagarajan	131	2.6	New
Turnout		5260	46.5	+8.5
Registered electors		11,320		
Liberal Democrats hold		Swing		
Liberal Democrats hold		Swing		
Liberal Democrats hold		Swing		

=== Chelsfield ===
Julian Grainger was formerly a Conservative Councillor in the Chelsfield and Pratts Bottom ward (2006-2014) although he defected to UKIP in February 2014

Chelsfield (2 seats)
Party	Candidate	Votes	%	±%
Conservative	Mike Botting*	2,507	49.2	−2.6
Conservative	Sumeet Jalan	2,184	42.9	−6.8
Liberal Democrats	Harsha Puttaswamy	1303	25.6	−2.4
Reform	Steven Clements	1195	23.5	New
Reform	Julian Grainger	1121	22.0	New
Liberal Democrats	Joseph Watchorn	1050	20.6	−1.1
Green	Senthil Krishna	409	8.0	−5.2
Labour	Lynn Sellwood	246	4.8	−10.4
Labour	Peter Tozer	172	3.4	−11.4
Turnout		5226	58.7	+17.7
Registered electors		8,909		
Conservative hold		Swing		
Conservative hold		Swing		

=== Chislehurst ===
Kieran Terry was formerly a Conservative Councillor for this ward (2018-2022)

Chislehurst (3 seats)
Party	Candidate	Votes	%	±%
Chislehurst Matters	Alison Stammers*	3,652	62.3	+3.4
Chislehurst Matters	Mark Smith*	3,528	60.2	+7.1
Chislehurst Matters	Mike Jack*	3,516	60.0	+7.3
Reform	Malcolm Hutty	1026	17.5	New
Reform	Andrew James	1010	17.2	New
Reform	Phil Wade	909	15.5	New
Conservative	Kieran Terry	828	14.1	−14.8
Conservative	Kamil Choudhury	778	13.3	−18.1
Conservative	Alfie Thomas	765	13.0	−17.3
Labour	Sam Blake	340	5.8	−4.2
Labour	Christian Mole	339	5.8	−3.3
Labour	Julian Heal	323	5.5	−4.0
Liberal Democrats	Katharine Bollon	231	3.9	−1.3
Liberal Democrats	Laura McCracken	197	3.4	−1.8
Liberal Democrats	Peter Mansell	150	2.6	New
Turnout		5952	50.9	+9.9
Registered electors		11,704		
Chislehurst Matters hold		Swing		
Chislehurst Matters hold		Swing		
Chislehurst Matters hold		Swing		

=== Clock House ===
Clock House (3 seats)
Party	Candidate	Votes	%	±%
Labour	Jeremy Adams*	3,105	47.6	−18.5
Labour	Jenny Coleman	3,087	47.3	−15.8
Labour	Josh King*	2,897	44.4	−18.6
Green	James Carter	1320	20.2	New
Green	Victoria Rennie	1312	20.1	New
Green	Aidan Keogh	1290	19.8	New
Conservative	Sarah Phillips	1086	16.6	−2.9
Conservative	Scott Pattenden	954	14.6	−4.4
Conservative	Christopher Watts	855	13.1	−5.8
Reform	Justin O'Neill	800	12.3	New
Reform	Larry Malyon	794	12.2	New
Reform	Paul Reeves	758	11.6	New
Liberal Democrats	Claudio Gambarotta	503	7.7	−7.8
Liberal Democrats	Emily Verazzo	421	6.4	−7.2
Liberal Democrats	Adam Pritchard	402	6.2	−6.8
Turnout		6660	51.8	+10.8
Registered electors		12,847		
Labour hold		Swing		
Labour hold		Swing		
Labour hold		Swing		

=== Crystal Palace & Anerley ===
Crystal Palace & Anerley (2 seats)
Party	Candidate	Votes	%	±%
Labour	Ruth McGregor*	1,787	50.4	−18.3
Labour	Ryan Thomson*	1,638	46.2	−16.2
Green	Sonay Erten	1259	35.5	+14.1
Green	Jordaine Osaghae	1189	33.5	+12.1
Reform	Karen Moran	280	7.9	New
Reform	David Quarterman	268	7.6	New
Conservative	Terry Richardson	236	6.7	5.7
Conservative	Tanya Singh	212	6.0	−4.8
Liberal Democrats	Stafford Fitch-Bunce	119	3.4	−6.9
Liberal Democrats	Pearse Reynolds	108	3.0	−4.1
Turnout		3637	41.7	+10.7
Registered electors		8,727		
Labour hold		Swing		
Labour hold		Swing		

=== Darwin ===
Darwin
Party	Candidate	Votes	%	±%
Conservative	Jonathan Andrews*	1,190	49.6	−6.8
Reform	Barry Cook	896	37.4	New
Green	Ann Garrett	142	5.9	+0.4
Labour	Freddie Price	89	3.7	−6.2
Liberal Democrats	Michael Jones	80	3.3	−4.6
Turnout		2,397	55	+19
Registered electors		4,333		
Conservative hold		Swing		

=== Farnborough & Crofton ===
†Angela Page was a sitting councillor in Chelsfield

Farnborough & Crofton
Party	Candidate	Votes	%	±%
Conservative	Angela Page†	3,376	45.4	−8.8
Conservative	Andy Dourmoush	3,341	44.9	−8.7
Conservative	Sheri Isa	3,164	42.6	−8.5
Reform	James Bowditch	2,062	27.7	New
Reform	Lou Bartholomew	2,020	27.2	New
Reform	Steven Guillemet	1,896	25.5	New
Liberal Democrats	Ian Catchpole	890	12.0	−10.8
Green	Mary-Clare Lewis	818	11.0	−1.3
Liberal Democrats	John Loosemore	792	10.7	−8.4
Labour	Christine McNamara	754	10.1	−9.6
Liberal Democrats	Deepanshi Gulati	684	9.2	−9.9
Green	Juergen Wiegerling	681	9.2	−3.1
Labour	Oscar Seal	591	7.9	−13.4
Labour	Chris Taylor	553	7.4	−11.6
Turnout		7,435	54	+14
Registered electors		13,689		
Conservative hold		Swing		
Conservative hold		Swing		
Conservative hold		Swing		

=== Hayes & Coney Hall ===
†Diane Smith was a sitting councillor in Kelsey and Eden Park

Hayes & Coney Hall
Party	Candidate	Votes	%	±%
Conservative	Josh Coldspring-White*	3,732	53.5%	+5.5%
Conservative	Alexa Michael*	3,588	51.4%	−0.6%
Conservative	Diane Smith†	3,363	48.2%	+3.8%
Reform	Gus Kennedy	1541	22.0%	New
Reform	Andrew Williams	1479	21.2%	New
Reform	Henrietta Oladipupo	1293	18.5%	New
Green	Sarah Chant	1173	16.8%	−3.5%
Labour	Peter Ayres	807	11.6%	−20.3%
Labour	Elizabeth Johnstone	795	11.4%	−12.7%
Labour	Rayhan Rahman	602	8.6%	−13.6%
Liberal Democrats	Tudor Griffiths	601	8.6%	−9.1%
Liberal Democrats	Margaret Gibbs	535	7.7%	−6.3%
Liberal Democrats	Nicholas Weaks	332	4.8%	−5.3%
Turnout		6,977	57%	+14%
Registered electors		12,280		
Conservative hold				
Conservative hold				
Conservative hold				

=== Kelsey & Eden Park ===
Kelsey & Eden Park
Party	Candidate	Votes	%	±%
Conservative	Mark Amis	2,468		
Conservative	Michael Doble	2,467		
Conservative	Christopher Phillips	2,209		
Labour	Matt Aldridge	1826		
Labour	Anne Williams	1664		
Labour	Ju Owens	1649		
Reform	Caroline Nevard	1075		
Reform	Louie Saunders	1046		
Reform	Daniel Slade	1031		
Green	Paul Jones	907		
Green	Lisa Mutti	785		
Green	Zach Knowles-Weir	759		
Liberal Democrats	Robert Jackson	509		
Liberal Democrats	Taylor Matthews	412		
Liberal Democrats	Matt Thorpe	387		
Turnout				
Registered electors				
Conservative hold				
Conservative hold				
Conservative hold				

=== Mottingham ===
Mottingham
Party	Candidate	Votes	%	±%
Conservative	Giles Cordwell	976	30.1	−15.4
Reform	Louise Sage	923	28.5	New
Conservative	Will Rowlands*	885	27.3	−12.1
Reform	Harriet Terry	885	27.3	New
Labour	Zarreena McKenley-Osbourne	669	20.6	−17.0
Labour	John Pead	649	20.0	−13.5
Green	Jamie Tulacz	478	14.8	+3.9
Green	Josh Thomas	466	14.4	New
Liberal Democrats	Sarah Adeduntan	200	6.2	−4.8
Liberal Democrats	Vicki Webber	174	5.4	−4.0
Turnout		3,240	40%	+11
Registered electors		8,180		
Conservative hold				
Reform gain from Conservative				

=== Orpington ===
Richard Scoates was formerly a Conservative Councillor for the Darwin ward (2010-2022)

Orpington
Party	Candidate	Votes	%	±%
Conservative	Kim Botting*	1,960	43.3	−4.1
Conservative	Pauline Tunnicliffe*	1,690	37.3	−9.4
Reform	Dean Sawyer	1195	26.4	New
Reform	Richard Scoates	1102	24.3	New
Liberal Democrats	Steven Sollitt	762	16.8	−13.0
Liberal Democrats	Allan Tweddle	686	15.1	−13.7
Green	Angela Dees	532	11.7	New
Labour	Malcolm Douglas Clark	413	9.1	−13.4
Labour	Patrick Lewis Malone	351	7.7	−11.5
Turnout		4,531	48	+11
Registered electors		9,388		
Conservative hold				
Conservative hold				

=== Penge & Cator ===
William Huntington-Thresher was formerly a Conservative Councillor in the Orpington ward (2006-2022)

Penge & Cator
Party	Candidate	Votes	%	±%
Labour	Kathy Bance*	3,007		
Labour	Simon Jeal*	2,661		
Labour	Kevin Kennedy-Brooks	2,489		
Green	Sarah Dearing	2061		
Green	Kyle Allen-Taylor	2003		
Green	Daniel Meyer	1818		
Reform	Calum Miller	636		
Reform	David Morrall	610		
Reform	Mila Robinson	581		
Conservative	William Huntington-Thresher	530		
Conservative	Tony Power	511		
Conservative	Michael Rutherford	483		
Liberal Democrats	Suraj Gandecha	327		
Liberal Democrats	Lindsay Victoria Maxwell	311		
Liberal Democrats	Dan Vongswang	226		
Labour hold				
Labour hold				
Labour hold				

=== Petts Wood & Knoll ===
Petts Wood & Knoll
Party	Candidate	Votes	%	±%
Conservative	George Barnes	4,010	55.0	+0.2
Conservative	Simon Fawthrop*	3,951	54.2	+1.4
Conservative	Tony Owen*	3,879	53.2	0.0
Reform	Hugh Dasley	1419	19.5	New
Reform	Ben Gulvin	1383	19.0	New
Reform	John Hemming-Clark	1380	18.9	New
Liberal Democrats	Sara Colaj	967	13.3	−13.0
Green	Saskia Sabelus	872	12.0	New
Liberal Democrats	Ben Loxley	791	10.8	−12.9
Liberal Democrats	Thomas Velvick	685	9.4	−11.4
Labour	Margaret Mills	674	9.2	−12.2
Labour	Tim Fisher	662	9.1	−11.5
Labour	Gareth Wretham	473	6.5	−10.3
Turnout		7,295	57	+14
Registered electors		12,884		
Conservative hold				
Conservative hold				
Conservative hold				

=== Plaistow ===
Alisa Igoe was elected for Labour in this ward, but left the party to serve as an independent

Gary Stevens was previously a Conservative councillor in the Cray Valley West ward (2018-2022)

Plaistow
Party	Candidate	Votes	%	±%
Conservative	Panos Papayannakos	1,328	30.1	−9.4
Conservative	Alwin Puthenpurakal	1,148	26.8	−11.6
Labour	Tony McPartlan*	1,127	26.3	−16.7
Labour	Elizabeth Morgan	942	22.0	−21.0
Reform	Gary Stevens	784	18.3	New
Reform	Paul Dhesi	770	18.0	New
Green	Mary Ion	669	15.6	+6.6
Independent	Alisa Igoe*	569	13.3	−31.2
Green	Ian McCormack	498	11.6	New
Liberal Democrats	Lesley Furniss	289	6.7	−3.1
Liberal Democrats	Peter Furniss	224	5.2	−3.2
Turnout		4284	45	+7
Registered electors		9,420		
Conservative gain from Labour		Swing		
Conservative gain from Labour		Swing		

=== Shortlands & Park Langley ===
Shortlands & Park Langley
Party	Candidate	Votes	%	±%
Conservative	Adam Grant*	3,121		
Conservative	Serena Gupta	3,018		
Conservative	Gemma Turrell*	3,003		
Reform	Edward Apostolides	1064		
Reform	Chris Hudson	1050		
Labour	Gail Emerson	1021		
Reform	Richard Percy	1002		
Green	Jessica Hardy	993		
Labour	Amin Aboushagor	969		
Labour	Jack Smith	953		
Green	Adam Shahin	924		
Green	Hannah Witham	861		
Liberal Democrats	Sarah Annabel Fox	671		
Liberal Democrats	John Beecroft	596		
Liberal Democrats	Stephen Wells	576		
Turnout				
Registered electors				
Conservative hold				
Conservative hold				
Conservative hold				

=== St Mary Cray ===
St Mary Cray
Party	Candidate	Votes	%	±%
Conservative	Yvonne Bear*	2,239	40.3	−6.0
Conservative	Shaun Slator*	2,154	38.7	−6.9
Conservative	Harry Stranger*	2,011	36.2	−8.1
Reform	John Michaelis	1637	29.4	New
Reform	Matthew Pearson	1599	28.7	New
Reform	Claire Rushworth	1578	28.4	New
Labour	Nathaniel Arthur	718	12.9	−27.3
Green	Hali Ibrahim	698	12.5	New
Green	Seamus McCauley	685	12.3	New
Green	Jake Rest	660	11.9	New
Labour	Richard Honess	640	11.5	−27.6
Labour	Julius Ubochi	521	9.4	−28.8
Liberal Democrats	Rebecca Casey	350	6.3	−6.5
Liberal Democrats	Olly Loosemore	350	6.3	−5.7
Liberal Democrats	Edward Donald Evans	261	4.7	−6.1
Turnout		5,562	40.6	+9.6
Registered electors		13,706		
Conservative hold				
Conservative hold				
Conservative hold				

=== St Paul's Cray ===
†Christopher Marlow was a sitting councillor in Farnborough and Crofton, elected as a Conservative before his defection in October 2025

St Paul's Cray
Party	Candidate	Votes	%	±%
Reform	Christopher Marlow†	1,588	36.9	New
Reform	Dean Miller	1,534	35.6	New
Reform	William Rawles	1,445	33.6	New
Labour	Chris Price*	1139	26.5	−13.7
Conservative	Bola Adediran	1138	26.4	−13.2
Labour	Debbie Price	1016	23.6	−15.5
Conservative	Anthony Whelan	1012	23.5	−14.9
Conservative	James Oleka	1008	23.4	−10.8
Labour	Janvier Palmer	901	20.9	−16.0
Green	Katharine Barker	651	15.1	New
Liberal Democrats	Gerda Loosemore-Reppen	278	6.5	−4.3
Liberal Democrats	Richard Newitt	242	5.6	−5.0
Liberal Democrats	Jonathan Swift	234	5.4	−4.3
Turnout		4,306	37%	+13.0
Registered electors		11,690		
Reform gain from Labour				
Reform gain from Conservatives				
Reform gain from Labour				

=== West Wickham ===
West Wickham
Party	Candidate	Votes	%	±%
Conservative	Daniel Burden	3,248		
Conservative	Hannah Gray	3,123		
Conservative	Christine Harris	3,093		
Reform	Chris Davenport	1253		
Reform	Deborah Percy	1134		
Reform	Laura Taylor	1094		
Labour	Peter Bently	964		
Labour	Olga Evans	845		
Green	Hilary Gee	808		
Green	Angela Hulm	795		
Labour	Lewis James Quinn	774		
Green	Anna Mansaray	704		
Liberal Democrats	Alison Davis	465		
Liberal Democrats	Ray Farnham	327		
Liberal Democrats	Richard Jones	313		
Conservative hold				
Conservative hold				
Conservative hold				

== Changes Since Election ==
Cllr Dean Miller (St Paul’s Cray) resigned from Reform UK in October 2026 after an undercover ITV News reporter filmed him making racist comments. He now sits as an Independent.
