= Bromley and Biggin Hill =

UK Parliament constituency (since 2024)

- County constituency for the House of Commons
- Interactive map of boundaries from 2024
- Location within Greater London
- County: Greater London
- Electorate: 70,418 (March 2020)

Current constituency
- Member of Parliament: Peter Fortune (Conservative)
- Seats: One
- Created from: Bromley and Chislehurst, Beckenham, Orpington

Bromley and Biggin Hill is a constituency in Greater London represented in the House of Commons of the UK Parliament. Created as a result of the 2023 review of Westminster constituencies, it was first contested at the 2024 general election, since when it has been represented by Peter Fortune of the Conservative Party.

== Constituency profile ==
The Bromley and Biggin Hill constituency is located in the Borough of Bromley on the outskirts of Greater London. It includes most of the large town of Bromley, the small outlying town of Biggin Hill and the rural area between them. The area was predominantly rural until the arrival of rail transport in 1858, after which the population grew rapidly. The area is suburban and affluent; most parts of the constituency are in the top 10% least-deprived areas in the country.

Residents of the constituency are considerably wealthier and more likely to work in professional jobs compared to national averages. White people make up 78% of the population with Asians being the largest ethnic minority group at 8%. At the local borough council, most of the constituency is represented by Conservative councillors, although some Liberal Democrats were elected in Bromley, and Biggin Hill is represented by independents. At the 2016 referendum on European Union membership, voters in Bromley and Biggin Hill were evenly split with an estimated 50% voting for each option.

== Boundaries ==
Under the 2023 boundary review, the constituency was defined as comprising the following wards of the London Borough of Bromley as they existed on 1 December 2020:

- Bickley; Biggin Hill; Bromley Common and Keston; Bromley Town; Darwin (part^{1}); Hayes and Coney Hall; Plaistow and Sundridge.

^{1.}Area marked “5” on the map of the Bromley and Biggin Hill constituency produced by the Boundary Commission for England

It covers the following areas:

- Just over half the electorate, comprising Bickley, Bromley, Plaistow and Sundridge, previously part of the abolished constituency of Bromley and Chislehurst
- Bromley Common, Keston, Hayes and Coney Hall, transferred from Beckenham (renamed Beckenham and Penge)
- Biggin Hill, transferred from Orpington

Following a local government boundary review which came into effect in May 2022, the constituency now comprises the following wards of the London Borough of Bromley from the 2024 general election:

- Bickley and Sundridge; Biggin Hill; Bromley Common and Holwood; Bromley Town; Darwin (polling district DAR1); Hayes and Coney Hall; Plaistow; Shortlands and Park Langley (polling district SHP5X).

== Elections ==
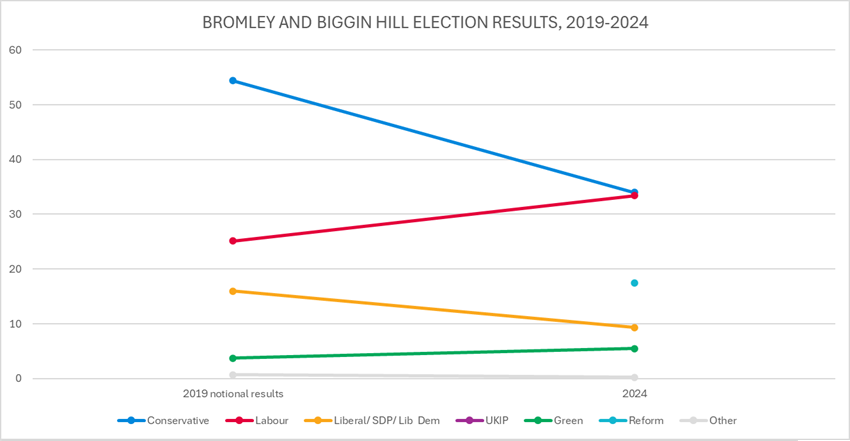
Election results 2019-2024

=== Elections in the 2020s ===
General election 2024: Bromley and Biggin Hill
Party	Candidate	Votes	%	±%
Conservative	Peter Fortune	15,929	34.0	−20.4
Labour	Oana Olaru-Holmes	15,627	33.4	+8.3
Reform	Alan Cook	8,203	17.5	N/A
Liberal Democrats	Julie Ireland	4,352	9.3	−6.7
Green	Caroline Sandes	2,583	5.5	+1.8
Climate	Karen Miller	94	0.2	N/A
Majority		302	0.6	−28.7
Turnout		46,788	66.2	−3.5
Registered electors		70,713		
Conservative hold		Swing	−14.4	

=== 2019 notional result ===
2019 notional result (Note: Estimate of the 2019 general election result as if the revised boundaries recommended under the 2023 boundary review were in place)
Party	Vote	%
Conservative	26,710	54.4
Labour	12,330	25.1
Liberal Democrats	7,838	16.0
Green	1,806	3.7
Others	374	0.7
Majority	14,380	29.3
Turnout	49,058	69.7
Electorate	70,418	
