= St Paul's Cray (ward) =

Electoral ward in London, England

- Electoral ward for the Bromley London Borough Council
- St Paul's Cray ward boundaries
- Borough: Bromley
- County: Greater London
- Population: 17,311 (2021) (Note: 2021 Census data reported for 2022 ward boundaries)
- Electorate: 11,686 (2022)
- Major settlements: St Paul's Cray
- Area: 13.28 square kilometres (5.13 sq mi)

Current electoral ward
- Created: 2022
- Number of members: 3
- Councillors: Christopher Marlow; Dean Miller; William Rawles
- Created from: Cray Valley East; Cray Valley West
- GSS code: E05014007

St Paul's Cray is an electoral ward in the London Borough of Bromley. The ward was first used in the 2022 elections. It returns councillors to Bromley London Borough Council.

== List of councillors ==
Seat	Councillor	Took office	Left office	Party	Election
1	Chris Price	2022	2026	Labour	2022
2	Colin Hitchins	2022	2026	Conservative	2022
3	Rebecca Wiffen	2022	2026	Labour	2022
1	Christopher Marlow (Note: Christopher Marlow was a councillor for Farnborough and Crofton from 2018 to 2026.)	2026	Incumbent	Reform	2026
2	Dean Miller (Note: Dean Miller changed parties in October 2026.)	2026	Incumbent	Reform	2026
2	Dean Miller	2026	Incumbent	Independent	2026
3	William Rawles	2026	Incumbent	Reform	2026

== Bromley council elections ==
There was a revision of ward boundaries in Bromley in 2022. St Paul's Cray ward was created from parts of Cray Valley East and Cray Valley West.

=== 2026 election ===
The election took place on 7 May 2026.

2026 Bromley London Borough Council election: St Paul's Cray
Party	Candidate	Votes	%	±%
Reform	Christopher Marlow	1,588	36.9	New
Reform	Dean Miller	1,534	35.6	New
Reform	William Rawles	1,445	33.6	New
Labour	Chris Price	1139	26.5	−13.7
Conservative	Bola Adediran	1138	26.4	−13.2
Labour	Debbie Price	1016	23.6	−15.5
Conservative	Anthony Whelan	1012	23.5	−14.9
Conservative	James Oleka	1008	23.4	−10.8
Labour	Janvier Palmer	901	20.9	−16.0
Green	Katharine Barker	651	15.1	New
Liberal Democrats	Gerda Loosemore-Reppen	278	6.5	−4.3
Liberal Democrats	Richard Newitt	242	5.6	−5.0
Liberal Democrats	Jonathan Swift	234	5.4	−4.3
Turnout		4,306	37%	+13.0
Registered electors		11,690		
Reform gain from Labour		Swing		
Reform gain from Conservative		Swing		
Reform gain from Labour		Swing		

=== 2022 election ===
The election took place on 5 May 2022.

2022 Bromley London Borough Council election: St Paul's Cray
Party	Candidate	Votes	%	±%
Labour	Chris Price	1,118	40.2	
Conservative	Colin Hitchins	1,101	39.6	
Labour	Rebecca Wiffen	1,089	39.1	
Conservative	Tina Powley	1,069	38.4	
Labour	Tim Westwood	1,028	36.9	
Conservative	Rahul Gupta	953	34.2	
Independent	Andy Wilson	476	17.1	
Liberal Democrats	Richard Jones	300	10.8	
Liberal Democrats	Dominic Alessio	295	10.6	
Liberal Democrats	Steve Sollitt	270	9.7	
Turnout		2,783	24	
Registered electors		11,686		
Labour win (new seat)				
Conservative win (new seat)				
Labour win (new seat)				
