= Mottingham (Bromley ward) =

Electoral ward in London, England

- Electoral ward for the Bromley London Borough Council
- Mottingham (Bromley) ward boundaries since 2022
- Borough: Bromley
- County: Greater London
- Population: 11,488 (2021) (Note: 2021 Census data reported for 2022 ward boundaries)
- Major settlements: Mottingham
- Area: 2.930 km²

Current electoral ward
- Created: 2022
- Number of members: 2
- Councillors: Giles Cordwell; Louise Sage
- GSS code: E05014000 (since 2022)

Mottingham is an electoral ward in the London Borough of Bromley. The ward was first used in the 2022 elections and elects three councilors. to Bromley London Borough Council.

== Bromley council elections since 2022 ==
There was a revision of ward boundaries in Bromley in 2022 and the Mottingham ward was recreated.

=== 2026 election ===
2026 Bromley London Borough Council election: Mottingham
Party	Candidate	Votes	%	±%
Conservative	Giles Cordwell	976	30.1	−15.4
Reform	Louise Sage	923	28.5	New
Conservative	Will Rowlands	885	27.3	−12.1
Reform	Harriet Terry	885	27.3	New
Labour	Zarreena McKenley-Osbourne	669	20.6	−17.0
Labour	John Pead	649	20.0	−13.5
Green	Jamie Tulacz	478	14.8	+3.9
Green	Josh Thomas	466	14.4	New
Liberal Democrats	Sarah Adeduntan	200	6.2	−4.8
Liberal Democrats	Vicki Webber	174	5.4	−4.0
Turnout		3,240	40%	+11
Registered electors		8,180		
Conservative hold				
Reform gain from Conservative				

=== 2022 election ===
The election took place on 5 May 2022.

2022 Bromley London Borough Council election: Mottingham (2)
Party	Candidate	Votes	%	±%
Conservative	David Cartwright	1,081	45.5	−0.2
Conservative	Will Rowlands	936	39.4	−1.4
Labour	Simon Thompson	892	37.6	
Labour	Owen Wittekind	795	33.5	
Liberal Democrats	John Houghton	262	11.0	
Green	Saskia Sabelus	258	10.9	
Liberal Democrats	Colin England	200	8.4	
Independent	Doreen Thompson	113	4.8	
Turnout		8,063	29	
Registered electors		8,063		
Conservative win (new seat)				
Conservative win (new seat)				

== 1978–2002 Bromley council elections ==
There was a revision of ward boundaries in Bromley in 1978.

=== 2001 by-election ===
The by-election took place on 5 July 2001, following the resignation of Robert Yeldham.

=== 1998 election ===
The election on 7 May 1998 took place on the same day as the 1998 Greater London Authority referendum.

=== 1994 election ===
The election took place on 5 May 1994.

=== 1990 election ===
The election took place on 3 May 1990.

=== 1986 election ===
The election took place on 8 May 1986.

=== 1982 election ===
The election took place on 6 May 1982.

=== 1978 election ===
The election took place on 4 May 1978.

== 1964–1978 Bromley council elections ==
=== 1974 election ===
The election took place on 2 May 1974.

=== 1971 election ===
The election took place on 13 May 1971.

=== 1968 election ===
The election took place on 9 May 1968.

=== 1964 election ===
The election took place on 7 May 1964.

== See also ==
- List of electoral wards in Greater London
