= Beckenham Town and Copers Cope =

Electoral ward in London, England

- Electoral ward for the Bromley London Borough Council
- Borough: Bromley
- County: Greater London
- Population: 16,363 (2021)
- Major settlements: Beckenham
- Area: 3.087 km²

Current electoral ward
- Created: 2022
- Councillors: 3

Beckenham Town and Copers Cope is an electoral ward in the London Borough of Bromley. The ward was first used in the 2022 elections and elects three councillors to Bromley London Borough Council.

== Geography ==
The ward is named after the town of Beckenham.

== Councillors ==
Election	Councillors		
2026	Chloe-Jane Ross (Liberal Democrats)	Gita Bapat (Liberal Democrats)	Steven Jefferies (Liberal Democrats)
2022	Michael Tickner (Conservative)	Chloe-Jane Ross (Liberal Democrats)	Will Connolly (Liberal Democrats)

== Elections ==
=== 2026 ===
Beckenham Town & Copers Cope (3 seats)
Party	Candidate	Votes	%	±%
Liberal Democrats	Chloe-Jane Ross*	2,257	36.8%	−0.1
Liberal Democrats	Gita Bapat	2,043	33.3%	−0.9
Liberal Democrats	Steven Jefferies	2,042	33.3%	+1.1
Conservative	Michael Tickner*	1,825	29.8%	−4.5
Conservative	Stephen Ayshford	1,753	28.6%	−4.9
Conservative	Patrick Olliffe	1,652	27.0%	−5.6
Green	Ruth Fabricant	869	14.1%	+3.5
Labour	Anna-Marie Blewer	858	14.0%	−15.0
Green	Geoff Newman	835	13.6%	New
Labour	Mike Brown	721	11.8%	−13.3
Green	Mark Phillippo	704	11.5%	New
Reform	Steve Walker	769	12.5%	New
Reform	Melody Whelan	724	11.8%	New
Reform	Dave Wibberley	687	11.2%	New
Labour	Sebastian Crisp	645	10.5%	−13.7
Turnout		6,234	50.1%	+7.1
Registered electors		12,441		
Liberal Democrats hold		Swing		
Liberal Democrats gain from Conservative		Swing		
Liberal Democrats hold		Swing		

=== 2022 ===
Beckenham Town and Copers Cope (3 seats)
Party	Candidate	Votes	%	±%
Liberal Democrats	Chloe-Jane Ross	1,900	36.9	+7.0
Conservative	Michael Tickner*	1,763	34.3	−6.4
Liberal Democrats	Will Connolly	1,762	34.2	+2.5
Conservative	Stephen Wells*	1,733	33.7	−6.2
Conservative	Carline Deal	1,676	32.6	−5.2
Liberal Democrats	Dave Marshall	1,651	32.1	+5.2
Labour	Helen Brookfield	1,492	29.0	+5.3
Labour	Qahir Bandali	1,292	25.1	+3.1
Labour	Dermot McKibbin	1,243	24.2	+3.3
Green	Ruth Fabricant	545	10.6	−0.8
Turnout		5,146	43	
Registered electors		11,995		
Liberal Democrats win (new seat)				
Conservative win (new seat)				
Liberal Democrats win (new seat)				
