= Penge and Cator =

Electoral ward in London, England

- Electoral ward for the Bromley London Borough Council
- Borough: Bromley
- County: Greater London
- Population: 18,909 (2021)
- Major settlements: Penge
- Area: 3.165 km²

Current electoral ward
- Created: 2002
- Councillors: 3

Penge and Cator is an electoral ward in the London Borough of Bromley. The ward was first used in the 2002 elections and elects three councillors to Bromley London Borough Council.

== Geography ==
The ward is named after the suburbs of Penge and Cator.

== Councillors ==
Election	Councillors		
2018	Kathy Bance (Labour)	Simon Jeal (Labour)	Kevin Kennedy-Brooks (Labour)
2022	Kathy Bance (Labour)	Simon Jeal (Labour)	Kevin Kennedy-Brooks (Labour)

== Elections ==
=== 2022 ===
Penge and Cator (3 seats)
Party	Candidate	Votes	%	±%
Labour	Kathy Bance*	3,655	75.0	+9.1
Labour	Simon Jeal*	3,082	63.2	+8.8
Labour	Kevin Kennedy-Brooks*	2,742	56.3	−0.8
Green	Geoffrey Allen	1,300	26.7	+6.1
Conservative	Sam Griffiths	664	13.6	
Conservative	Josh Coldspring-White	658	13.5	
Liberal Democrats	Jonathan Burns	603	12.4	
Conservative	Sumeet Jalan	602	12.4	
Liberal Democrats	Lindsay Maxwell	370	7.6	
Liberal Democrats	Michael Jones	288	5.9	
Turnout		4,873	36	
Registered electors		13,622		
Labour hold		Swing		
Labour hold		Swing		
Labour hold		Swing		

=== 2018 ===
Penge and Cator
Party	Candidate	Votes	%	±%
Labour	Kathy Bance	3,259	65.9	
Labour	Kevin Brooks	2,828	57.1	
Labour	Simon Jeal	2,692	54.4	
Conservative	Sarah Dalton	1,021	20.6	
Green	Geoffrey Allen	1,009	20.4	
Conservative	Neil Jopson	952	19.2	
Conservative	David Kenyon	897	18.1	
Liberal Democrats	Marguerite Pierre	576	11.6	
Liberal Democrats	Jonathan Douglas-Green	507	10.2	
Liberal Democrats	Philip Storry	447	9.0	
Turnout		14,188	40	
Registered electors		12,471		
Labour hold		Swing		
Labour hold		Swing		
Labour hold		Swing		

== See also ==
- List of electoral wards in Greater London
