= Clock House (ward) =

Electoral ward in London, England

- Electoral ward for the Bromley London Borough Council
- Borough: Bromley
- County: Greater London
- Population: 17,359 (2021)
- Area: 2.528 km²

Current electoral ward
- Created: 1965
- Councillors: 3 (since 2002); 2 (until 2002)

Clock House is an electoral ward in the London Borough of Bromley. The ward was first used in the 1964 elections and elects three councillors to Bromley London Borough Council.

== Geography ==
The ward is named after the district of Clock House.

== Councillors ==
Election	Councillors		
2018	Vanessa Allen (Labour)	Josh King (Labour)	Ian Dunn (Labour)
2022	Jessica Arnold (Labour)	Josh King (Labour)	Jeremy Adams (Labour)

== Elections ==
=== 2022 ===
Clock House (3 seats)
Party	Candidate	Votes	%	±%
Labour	Jessica Arnold	3,464	66.1	+17.7
Labour	Josh King*	3,305	63.1	+21.7
Labour	Jeremy Adams	3,299	63.0	+19.2
Conservative	Gemma Turrell	1,020	19.5	−7.5
Conservative	Jack Miller	997	19.0	−6.8
Conservative	Will Joce	991	18.9	−5.5
Liberal Democrats	Claudio Gambarotta	810	15.5	−6.9
Liberal Democrats	Nicholas Weaks	714	13.6	−8.4
Liberal Democrats	Jonathan Webber	679	13.0	−8.1
Turnout		5,237	41	
Registered electors		12,647		
Labour hold		Swing		
Labour hold		Swing		
Labour hold		Swing		

=== 2018 ===
Clock House
Party	Candidate	Votes	%	±%
Labour	Vanessa Allen	2,638	48.4	+8.5
Labour	Ian Dunn	2,386	43.8	+10.5
Labour	Josh King	2,254	41.4	+8.7
Conservative	Christopher Phillips	1,470	27.0	−7.0
Conservative	Christine Harris	1,407	25.8	−6.1
Conservative	Scott Pattenden	1,328	24.4	−4.0
Liberal Democrats	Juliet Corbett	1,218	22.4	+6.0
Liberal Democrats	Michael Jones	1,197	22.0	+10.0
Liberal Democrats	Adam Bambrough	1,151	21.1	+11.3
Green	Nicola Nugent	704	12.9	−5.6
Turnout		15,753	46	
Registered electors		11,880		
Labour hold		Swing		
Labour hold		Swing		
Labour gain from Conservative		Swing		

== See also ==
- List of electoral wards in Greater London
