= West Wickham (ward) =

Electoral ward in London, England

- Electoral ward for the Bromley London Borough Council
- Borough: Bromley
- County: Greater London
- Population: 14,768 (2021)
- Major settlements: West Wickham
- Area: 4.286 km²

Current electoral ward
- Created: 2002
- Councillors: 3

West Wickham is an electoral ward in the London Borough of Bromley. The ward was first used in the 2002 elections and elects three councillors to Bromley London Borough Council.

== Geography ==
The ward is named after the district of West Wickham.

== Councillors ==
Election	Councillors		
2018	Mark Brock (Conservative)	Colin Smith (Conservative)	Nicholas Bennett (Conservative)
2022	Mark Brock (Conservative)	Colin Smith (Conservative)	Nicholas Bennett (Conservative)

== Elections ==
=== 2022 ===
West Wickham (3 seats)
Party	Candidate	Votes	%	±%
Conservative	Mark Brock*	2,341	51.6	−8.8
Conservative	Hannah Gray*	2,172	47.9	−7.2
Conservative	Nicholas Bennett*	2,164	47.7	−8.0
Labour	Angela Barnett	1,308	28.9	
Labour	Philip Shemmings	1,256	27.7	
Labour	Peter Barnett	1,114	24.6	
Green	Angela Hulm	763	16.8	
Liberal Democrats	Rachael Clarke	618	13.6	
Liberal Democrats	Christopher Bentley	557	12.3	
Liberal Democrats	Michelle Pike	535	11.8	
Reform	Victor Jackson	133	2.9	−1.5
Turnout		4,533	39	−3
Registered electors		11,556		
Conservative hold		Swing		
Conservative hold		Swing		
Conservative hold		Swing		

=== 2018 ===
West Wickham
Party	Candidate	Votes	%	±%
Conservative	Mark Brock	3,072	60.4	
Conservative	Nicholas Bennett	2,834	55.7	
Conservative	Hannah Gray	2,804	55.1	
Labour	Eli David	1,003	19.7	
Labour	Jeremy Adams	971	19.1	
Labour	Joanna Crispin	969	19.1	
Liberal Democrats	James Spencer-Boyce	846	16.6	
Green	Jenny Cambell B. Rust	562	11.0	
Liberal Democrats	Nigel Peaple	532	10.5	
Liberal Democrats	Stephen Wells	489	9.6	
UKIP	Victor Jackson	223	4.4	
UKIP	Colin Chuck	183	3.6	
UKIP	Brian Danes	148	2.9	
Turnout		14,636	42	
Registered electors		11,977		
Conservative hold		Swing		
Conservative hold		Swing		
Conservative hold		Swing		

== See also ==
- List of electoral wards in Greater London
