= Orpington (ward) =

Electoral ward in London, England

- Electoral ward for the Bromley London Borough Council
- Borough: Bromley
- County: Greater London
- Population: 11,960 (2021)
- Major settlements: Orpington
- Area: 3.220 km²

Current electoral ward
- Created: 2002
- Councillors: 2 (since 2022); 3 (2002 to 2022)

Orpington is an electoral ward in the London Borough of Bromley. The ward was first used in the 2002 elections and elects two councillors to Bromley London Borough Council.

== Geography ==
The ward is named after the town of Orpington.

== Councillors ==
Election	Councillors		
2018	Kim Botting (Conservative)	Pauline Tunnicliffe (Conservative)	William Huntington-Thresher (Conservative)
2022	Kim Botting (Conservative)	Pauline Tunnicliffe (Conservative)	Two seats

== Elections ==
=== 2022 ===
Orpington (2 seats)
Party	Candidate	Votes	%	±%
Conservative	Kim Botting*	1,630	47.4	−14.7
Conservative	Pauline Tunnicliffe*	1,608	46.7	−12.6
Liberal Democrats	Rick Das	1,026	29.8	+15.1
Liberal Democrats	David Morrison	991	28.8	+15.8
Labour	Hannah Barlow	774	22.5	+1.9
Labour	James Talbot	661	19.2	−1.4
Turnout		3,441	37	
Registered electors		9,210		
Conservative hold		Swing		
Conservative hold		Swing		

=== 2018 ===
Orpington
Party	Candidate	Votes	%	±%
Conservative	Kim Botting	2,857	62.1	
Conservative	Pauline Tunnicliffe	2,729	59.3	
Conservative	William Huntington-Thresher	2,694	58.6	
Labour	Christopher Price	949	20.6	
Labour	Vibeke Fussing	947	20.6	
Labour	Gareth Wretham	805	17.5	
Liberal Democrats	Michael Hall	674	14.7	
Liberal Democrats	Elaine Mackay	598	13.0	
Green	Michael Marriott	507	11.0	
Liberal Democrats	Reinhard Rometsch	430	9.3	
Turnout		13,190	38	
Registered electors		12,110		
Conservative hold		Swing		
Conservative hold		Swing		
Conservative hold		Swing		

== See also ==
- List of electoral wards in Greater London
