= Hayes and Coney Hall =

- Electoral ward for the Bromley London Borough Council
- Hayes and Coney Hall ward boundaries since 2022
- Borough: Bromley
- County: Greater London
- Population: 15,908 (2021) (Note: 2021 Census data reported for 2022 ward boundaries)
- Electorate: 12,106 (2022)
- Area: 12.46 square kilometres (4.81 sq mi)

Current electoral ward
- Created: 2002
- Councillors: 3
- GSS code: E05000119 (2002–2022); E05013998 (2022–present)

Hayes and Coney Hall is an electoral ward in the London Borough of Bromley. The ward was first used in the 2002 elections. It returns three councillors to Bromley London Borough Council.

== List of councillors ==
Term	Councillor	Party
2002–2014	Thelma Manning	Conservative
2002–2022	Graham Arthur	Conservative
2002–2022	Neil Reddin	Conservative
2014–2022	Peter Fortune	Conservative
2022–present	Alexa Michael	Conservative
2022–present	Thomas Turrell	Conservative
2022–2023	Andrew Lee	Conservative
2023–present	Josh Coldspring-White	Conservative

== Bromley council elections since 2022 ==
There was a revision of ward boundaries in Bromley in 2022.

=== 2023 by-election ===
The by-election took place on 7 December 2023, following the death of Andrew Lee.

2023 Hayes and Coney Hall by-election
Party	Candidate	Votes	%	±%
Conservative	Josh Coldspring-White	1,541	48.0	
Labour	Susan Moore	962	30.0	
Liberal Democrats	Tudor Griffiths	526	16.4	
Green	Sarah Chant	183	5.7	
Turnout		3,212	27	
Registered electors		12,063		
Conservative hold		Swing		

=== 2022 election ===
The election took place on 5 May 2022.

2022 Bromley London Borough Council election: Hayes and Coney Hall
Party	Candidate	Votes	%	±%
Conservative	Alexa Michael	2,527	52.0	−7.4
Conservative	Thomas Turrell	2,347	48.3	
Conservative	Andrew Lee	2,184	44.9	
Labour	Susan Moore	1,552	31.9	
Labour	Thomas Morton	1,171	24.1	
Labour	Michael Roberts	1,049	21.6	
Green	Sarah Chant	986	20.3	
Liberal Democrats	Tudor Griffiths	858	17.7	+6.8
Liberal Democrats	Liz Kemp	679	14.0	
Liberal Democrats	Andrew De Whalley	491	10.1	
Turnout		4,859	40	
Registered electors		12,106		
Conservative win (new boundaries)				
Conservative win (new boundaries)				
Conservative win (new boundaries)				

== 2002–2022 Bromley council elections ==
Hayes and Coney Hall ward boundaries from 2002 to 2022

=== 2018 election ===
The election took place on 3 May 2018.

2018 Bromley London Borough Council election: Hayes and Coney Hall
Party	Candidate	Votes	%	±%
Conservative	Graham Arthur	3,096	60.4	+4.1
Conservative	Peter Fortune	3,087	60.2	+13.2
Conservative	Neil Reddin	2,830	55.2	+7.6
Labour	Peter Ayres	950	18.5	+1.8
Labour	Gail Emerson	950	18.5	+4.7
Labour	Glenys Ingham	918	17.9	+7.6
Liberal Democrats	Ellen Griffiths	733	14.3	+4.8
Green	Mary Ion	621	12.1	−1.7
Liberal Democrats	Tudor Griffiths	559	10.9	−3.8
Liberal Democrats	Michael Fox	535	10.4	New
UKIP	Michael Rudd	261	5.1	−20.5
UKIP	Sandra Pearson	243	4.7	−19.2
Turnout		14,783	41	
Registered electors		12,604		
Conservative hold		Swing		
Conservative hold		Swing		
Conservative hold		Swing		

=== 2014 election ===
The election took place on 22 May 2014.

2014 Bromley London Borough Council election: Hayes and Coney Hall
Party	Candidate	Votes	%	±%
Conservative	Graham Arthur	2,965	56.3	
Conservative	Neil Reddin	2,509	47.6	
Conservative	Peter Fortune	2,475	47.0	
UKIP	Gwendoline Tanner	1,349	25.6	
UKIP	Brian Philp	1,259	23.9	
Labour	Katherine Head	878	16.7	
Labour	John Parke	725	13.8	
Green	John Street	725	13.8	
Labour	Bernard Wilson	543	10.3	
Liberal Democrats	Owen Griffiths	503	9.5	
Liberal Democrats	Steven Daniell	374	7.1	
Turnout		5269	42.10	
Conservative hold		Swing		
Conservative hold		Swing		
Conservative hold		Swing		

=== 2010 election ===
The election on 6 May 2010 took place on the same day as the United Kingdom general election.

2010 Bromley London Borough Council election: Hayes and Coney Hall
Party	Candidate	Votes	%	±%
Conservative	Thelma Manning	5,549	58.5	
Conservative	Graham Arthur	5,250		
Conservative	Neil Reddin	4,893		
Liberal Democrats	Owen Griffiths	1,990	21.0	
Liberal Democrats	Steven Daniell	1,648		
Liberal Democrats	Sonia Whitaker	1,428		
Labour	Katharine Head	1,182	12.5	
Labour	John Parke	1,005		
Labour	Richard Watts	812		
Green	John Reber	769	8.1	
Turnout		9,053	72.7	
Conservative hold		Swing		
Conservative hold		Swing		
Conservative hold		Swing		

=== 2006 election ===
The election took place on 4 May 2006.

2006 Bromley London Borough Council election: Hayes and Coney Hall
Party	Candidate	Votes	%	±%
Conservative	Thelma Manning	3,799	72.6	
Conservative	Graham Arthur	3,586		
Conservative	Neil Reddin	3,423		
Liberal Democrats	Mary Morgan	862	16.5	
Liberal Democrats	Tudor Griffiths	856		
Liberal Democrats	Steven Daniell	793		
Labour	David Cordell	569	10.9	
Labour	Katharine Head	511		
Labour	Laura Padoan	488		
Turnout			43.2	
Conservative hold		Swing		
Conservative hold		Swing		
Conservative hold		Swing		

=== 2002 election ===
The election took place on 2 May 2002.
