= Farnborough and Crofton =

Electoral ward in London, England

- Electoral ward for the Bromley London Borough Council
- Farnborough and Crofton ward boundaries since 2022
- Borough: Bromley
- County: Greater London
- Population: 17,705 (2021) (Note: 2021 Census data reported for 2022 ward boundaries)
- Electorate: 13,524 (2022)
- Major settlements: Farnborough and Crofton
- Area: 7.389 square kilometres (2.853 sq mi)

Current electoral ward
- Created: 2002
- Number of members: 3
- Councillors: Angela Page; Andy Dourmoush; Sheri Isa
- GSS code: E05000118 (2002–2022); E05013997 (2022–present)

Farnborough and Crofton is an electoral ward in the London Borough of Bromley. The ward was first used in the 2002 elections and elects three councillors to Bromley London Borough Council.

== List of councillors ==
| Term | Councillor | Party |
|---|---|---|
| 2002–2010 | Jennifer Hillier | Conservative |
| 2002–2026 | Charles Joel | Conservative |
| 2002–2018 | Timothy Stevens | Conservative |
| 2010–2026 | Bob Evans | Conservative |
| 2018–2026 | Christopher Marlow (Note: Christopher Marlow changed parties in 2025) | Conservative |
| 2018–2026 | Christopher Marlow | Reform |
| 2026–present | Angela Page | Conservative |
| 2026–present | Andy Dourmoush | Conservative |
| 2026–present | Sheri Isa | Conservative |

== Bromley council elections since 2022 ==
There was a revision of ward boundaries in Bromley in 2022.

=== 2026 election ===
2026 Bromley London Borough Council election: Farnborough and Crofton
| Party | Candidate | Votes | % | ±% |
|---|---|---|---|---|
| Conservative | Angela Page | 3,376 | 45.4 | −8.8 |
| Conservative | Andy Dourmoush | 3,341 | 44.9 | −8.7 |
| Conservative | Sheri Isa | 3,164 | 42.6 | −8.5 |
| Reform | James Bowditch | 2,062 | 27.7 | New |
| Reform | Lou Bartholomew | 2,020 | 27.2 | New |
| Reform | Steven Guillemet | 1,896 | 25.5 | New |
| Liberal Democrats | Ian Catchpole | 890 | 12.0 | −10.8 |
| Green | Mary-Clare Lewis | 818 | 11.0 | −1.3 |
| Liberal Democrats | John Loosemore | 792 | 10.7 | −8.4 |
| Labour | Christine McNamara | 754 | 10.1 | −9.6 |
| Liberal Democrats | Deepanshi Gulati | 684 | 9.2 | −9.9 |
| Green | Juergen Wiegerling | 681 | 9.2 | −3.1 |
| Labour | Oscar Seal | 591 | 7.9 | −13.4 |
| Labour | Chris Taylor | 553 | 7.4 | −11.6 |
| Turnout | | 7,435 | 54 | +14 |
| Registered electors | | 13,689 | | |
| Conservative hold | | Swing | | |
| Conservative hold | | Swing | | |
| Conservative hold | | Swing | | |

=== 2022 election ===
The election took place on 5 May 2022.

2022 Bromley London Borough Council election: Farnborough and Crofton
| Party | Candidate | Votes | % | ±% |
|---|---|---|---|---|
| Conservative | Bob Evans | 2,941 | 54.2 | |
| Conservative | Charles Joel | 2,910 | 53.6 | |
| Conservative | Christopher Marlow | 2,773 | 51.1 | |
| Liberal Democrats | Katherine Anderson | 1,239 | 22.8 | |
| Labour | Cameron Bewley | 1,154 | 21.3 | |
| Labour | Christine McNamara | 1,071 | 19.7 | |
| Liberal Democrats | Allan Tweddle | 1,038 | 19.1 | |
| Labour | Tim Fisher | 977 | 18.0 | |
| Liberal Democrats | John Mangold | 910 | 16.8 | |
| Green | Juergen Wiegerling | 669 | 12.3 | |
| Turnout | | 5,427 | 40 | |
| Registered electors | | 13,524 | | |
| Conservative win (new boundaries) | | | | |
| Conservative win (new boundaries) | | | | |
| Conservative win (new boundaries) | | | | |

== 2002–2022 Bromley council elections ==
Farnborough and Crofton ward boundaries from 2002 to 2022

=== 2018 election ===
The election took place on 3 May 2018.

2018 Bromley London Borough Council election: Farnborough and Crofton
| Party | Candidate | Votes | % | ±% |
|---|---|---|---|---|
| Conservative | Bob Evans | 3,276 | 64.3 | +6.1 |
| Conservative | Charles Joel | 3,208 | 62.9 | +5.6 |
| Conservative | Christopher Marlow | 2,987 | 58.6 | +4.5 |
| Liberal Democrats | Ian Catchpole | 810 | 15.9 | +8.0 |
| Labour | Malcolm Clark | 789 | 15.5 | +1.8 |
| Liberal Democrats | Allan Tweddle | 776 | 15.2 | New |
| Labour | Christine McNamara | 744 | 14.6 | +2.3 |
| Liberal Democrats | Oliver Loosemore | 683 | 13.4 | New |
| Labour | John Pead | 619 | 12.1 | +0.8 |
| Green | Tamara Galloway | 449 | 8.8 | −3.4 |
| UKIP | Kenneth Tracey | 295 | 5.8 | −16.2 |
| For Britain | Mandy Baldwin | 142 | 2.8 | New |
| Turnout | | 14,778 | 44 | |
| Registered electors | | 11,648 | | |
| Conservative hold | | Swing | | |
| Conservative hold | | Swing | | |
| Conservative hold | | Swing | | |

=== 2014 election ===
The election took place on 22 May 2014.

2014 Bromley London Borough Council election: Farnborough and Crofton
| Party | Candidate | Votes | % | ±% |
|---|---|---|---|---|
| Conservative | Bob Evans | 3,053 | 58.2 | |
| Conservative | Charles Joel | 3,005 | 57.3 | |
| Conservative | Timothy Stevens | 2,838 | 54.1 | |
| UKIP | Christine Diamond | 1,280 | 24.4 | |
| UKIP | Kenneth Tracey | 1,151 | 22.0 | |
| Labour | Ceri Hiles | 717 | 13.7 | |
| Labour | Lynn Sellwood | 644 | 12.3 | |
| Green | Brian Miller | 638 | 12.2 | |
| Labour | Christopher Price | 594 | 11.3 | |
| Liberal Democrats | Seran Yusuf | 415 | 7.9 | |
| Turnout | | 5246 | 44.96 | |
| Conservative hold | | Swing | | |
| Conservative hold | | Swing | | |
| Conservative hold | | Swing | | |

=== 2010 election ===
The election on 6 May 2010 took place on the same day as the United Kingdom general election.

2010 Bromley London Borough Council election: Farnborough and Crofton
| Party | Candidate | Votes | % | ±% |
|---|---|---|---|---|
| Conservative | Charles Joel | 5,067 | 59.0 | |
| Conservative | Bob Evans | 5,000 | | |
| Conservative | Timothy Stevens | 4,791 | | |
| Liberal Democrats | Helen Rabbatts | 2,139 | 24.9 | |
| Liberal Democrats | Charles Powell | 2,134 | | |
| Liberal Democrats | Harry Silvester | 1,944 | | |
| UKIP | Christine Diamond | 726 | 8.5 | |
| Labour | Bryan Gay | 656 | 7.6 | |
| Labour | Andrew Amos | 629 | | |
| Labour | Christopher Taylor | 627 | | |
| Turnout | | 8,695 | 75.5 | |
| Conservative hold | | Swing | | |
| Conservative hold | | Swing | | |
| Conservative hold | | Swing | | |

=== 2006 election ===
The election took place on 4 May 2006.

2006 Bromley London Borough Council election: Farnborough and Crofton
| Party | Candidate | Votes | % | ±% |
|---|---|---|---|---|
| Conservative | Jennifer Hillier | 3,591 | 63.2 | |
| Conservative | Charles Joel | 3,414 | | |
| Conservative | Timothy Stevens | 3,245 | | |
| Liberal Democrats | Barbara Moran | 1,038 | 18.3 | |
| Liberal Democrats | Vivian Ross | 1,017 | | |
| Liberal Democrats | Leo Staggs | 875 | | |
| Independent | Kathryn Taylor | 743 | 13.1 | |
| Labour | Malcolm Barker | 276 | 4.9 | |
| Labour | Bryan Gay | 259 | | |
| Labour | Harvey Guntrip | 219 | | |
| UKIP | Ken Tracey | 38 | 0.7 | |
| Turnout | | | 48.1 | |
| Conservative hold | | Swing | | |
| Conservative hold | | Swing | | |
| Conservative hold | | Swing | | |

=== 2002 election ===
The election took place on 2 May 2002.

2002 Bromley London Borough Council election: Farnborough and Crofton
| Party | Candidate | Votes | % | ±% |
|---|---|---|---|---|
| Conservative | Jennifer Hillier | 2,858 | | |
| Conservative | Charles Joel | 2,724 | | |
| Conservative | Timothy Stevens | 2,682 | | |
| Liberal Democrats | Bob Evans | 2,102 | | |
| Liberal Democrats | Helen Rabbatts | 2,099 | | |
| Liberal Democrats | Vivian Ross | 2,006 | | |
| Labour | Peter Moore | 217 | | |
| Labour | Lynn Sellwood | 191 | | |
| Labour | Christopher Taylor | 168 | | |
| Turnout | | | | |
| Conservative win (new seat) | | | | |
| Conservative win (new seat) | | | | |
| Conservative win (new seat) | | | | |
