= Chislehurst Matters =

British political party

- Abbreviation: CM
- Founded: 2022
- Ideology: Localism; Non-partisan politics
- Bromley Council: 3 / 58

Website
- www.chislehurstmatters.com

Chislehurst Matters is a local political party based in Chislehurst, Greater London.

== History ==
Chislehurst Matters was registered as a political party with the electoral commission in 2022 and won all three seats for Chislehurst ward in the 2022 Bromley London Borough Council election.

Name	Ward
Alison Stammers	Chislehurst
Mark Smith	Chislehurst
Michael Jack	Chislehurst

All 3 candidates stood again in the 2026 Bromley London Borough Council election. They were all elected.

== See also ==
- List of political parties in the United Kingdom
