= Bickley and Sundridge =

Electoral ward in London, England

- Electoral ward for the Bromley London Borough Council
- Bickley and Sundridge ward boundaries since 2022
- Borough: Bromley
- County: Greater London
- Population: 17,766 (2021) (Note: 2021 Census data reported for 2022 ward boundaries)
- Electorate: 13,421 (2022)
- Major settlements: Bickley and Sundridge
- Area: 5.446 square kilometres (2.103 sq mi)

Current electoral ward
- Created: 2022
- Number of members: 3
- Councillors: Kate Lymer; Colin Smith; Kira Gabbert
- Created from: Bickley and Plaistow and Sundridge
- GSS code: E05013988

Bickley and Sundridge is an electoral ward in the London Borough of Bromley. The ward was first used in the 2022 elections. It return three councillors to Bromley London Borough Council. The ward includes Bickley, Sundridge and Widmore.

== List of councillors ==
Seat	Councillor	Took office	Left office	Party	Election
1	Kate Lymer	2022	Incumbent	Conservative	2022
2	Colin Smith	2022	Incumbent	Conservative	2022
3	Kira Gabbert	2022	Incumbent	Conservative	2022

== Bromley council elections ==
=== 2022 election ===
The election took place on 5 May 2022.

2022 Bromley London Borough Council election: Bickley and Sundridge
Party	Candidate	Votes	%	±%
Conservative	Kate Lymer	2,671	51.6	−6.4
Conservative	Colin Smith	2,643	51.1	−5.1
Conservative	Kira Gabbert	2,626	50.7	−7.6
Labour	Kelly Galvin	1,233	23.8	+3.5
Labour	Laura Vogel	1,182	22.8	+6.8
Labour	Tom Davies	1,163	22.5	+7.7
Liberal Democrats	Robert Cliff	996	19.2	+1.4
Liberal Democrats	Martin Cooper	919	17.8	+2.8
Liberal Democrats	Clive Broadhurst	796	15.4	+1.5
Green	Roisin Robertson	779	15.1	+2.6
Turnout		5,176	39	
Registered electors		13,421		
Conservative win (new seat)				
Conservative win (new seat)				
Conservative win (new seat)				

=== 2026 election ===
The election took place on 7 May 2026.

2026 Bromley London Borough Council election: Bickley and Sundridge
Party	Candidate	Votes	%	±%
Conservative	Mark Brock	3,666	53.5%	+2.8
Conservative	Kate Lymer*	3,564	52.0%	+0.4
Conservative	Colin Smith*	3,474	50.7%	−0.4
Reform	Michael Ellery	1,210	17.7%	New
Reform	John Evans	1,160	16.9%	New
Reform	Adrian Lawrence	1,103	16.1%	New
Green	Cecilia Broderick	1,041	15.2%	+0.1
Green	Charles Mulvihill	806	11.8%	New
Labour	Gary Dixson	695	10.1%	−13.7
Green	Denis Tyurenkov	688	10.0%	New
Liberal Democrats	Martin Cooper	680	9.9%	−7.9
Labour	Robert Evans	662	9.7%	−−13.1
Liberal Democrats	Robert Cliff	653	9.5%	−9.7
Labour	Kyle Sewell	625	9.1%	−13.4
Liberal Democrats	Jon Webber	538	7.8%	−7.6
Turnout		7,001	51.3%	+12.3
Registered electors		13,644		
Conservative hold		Swing		
Conservative hold		Swing		
Conservative hold		Swing		
