= Crystal Palace and Anerley =

- Electoral ward for the Bromley London Borough Council
- Crystal Palace and Anerley ward boundaries since 2022
- Borough: Bromley
- County: Greater London
- Population: 12,029 (2021) (Note: 2021 Census data reported for 2022 ward boundaries)
- Electorate: 8,373 (2022)
- Area: 1.826 square kilometres (0.705 sq mi)

Current electoral ward
- Created: 2022
- Councillors: 2
- Created from: Crystal Palace
- GSS code: E05013995

Crystal Palace and Anerley is an electoral ward in the London Borough of Bromley. The ward was first used in the 2022 elections. It returns two councillors to Bromley London Borough Council.

== Bromley council elections ==
=== 2022 election ===
The election took place on 5 May 2022.

2022 Bromley London Borough Council election:Crystal Palace and Anerley
Party	Candidate	Votes	%	±%
Labour	Ruth McGregor	1,760	68.7	+5.7
Labour	Ryan Thomson	1,549	60.4	+7.3
Green	Maria Psaras	548	21.4	+4.4
Conservative	Penny Jones	317	12.4	−1.6
Conservative	Joseph Ward	276	10.8	−2.6
Liberal Democrats	Philippa Bridge	265	10.3	−6.4
Liberal Democrats	Stuart Benefield	181	7.1	−2.7
Turnout		2,563	31	
Registered electors		8,373		
Labour win (new seat)				
Labour win (new seat)				
