= St Mary Cray (ward) =

Electoral ward in London, England

- Electoral ward for the Bromley London Borough Council
- Borough: Bromley
- County: Greater London
- Population: 18,436 (2021)
- Major settlements: St Mary Cray
- Area: 4.284 km²

Current electoral ward
- Created: 2022
- Councillors: 3

St Mary Cray is an electoral ward in the London Borough of Bromley. The ward was first used in the 2022 elections and elects three councillors to Bromley London Borough Council.

== Geography ==
The ward is named after the suburb of St Mary Cray.

== Councillors ==
Election	Councillors		
2022	Yvonne Bear (Conservative)	Shaun Slator (Conservative)	Harry Stranger (Conservative)

== Elections ==
=== 2022 ===
St Mary Cray (New) (3 seats)
Party	Candidate	Votes	%	±%
Conservative	Yvonne Bear*	1,930	46.3	+2.2
Conservative	Shaun Slator	1,900	45.6	
Conservative	Harry Stranger*	1,847	44.3	+4.4
Labour	Nathaniel Arthur	1,676	40.2	+2.6
Labour	Richard Honess	1,627	39.1	
Labour	Deborah Price	1,590	38.2	
Liberal Democrats	Victoria Webber	533	12.8	
Liberal Democrats	Ian Magrath	499	12.0	
Liberal Democrats	Peter Mansell	448	10.8	
Turnout		4,166	31	
Registered electors		13,501		
Conservative win (new seat)				
Conservative win (new seat)				
Conservative win (new seat)				

== See also ==
- List of electoral wards in Greater London
