= Peter Fortune =

British politician (born 1978)

Peter Fortune MP
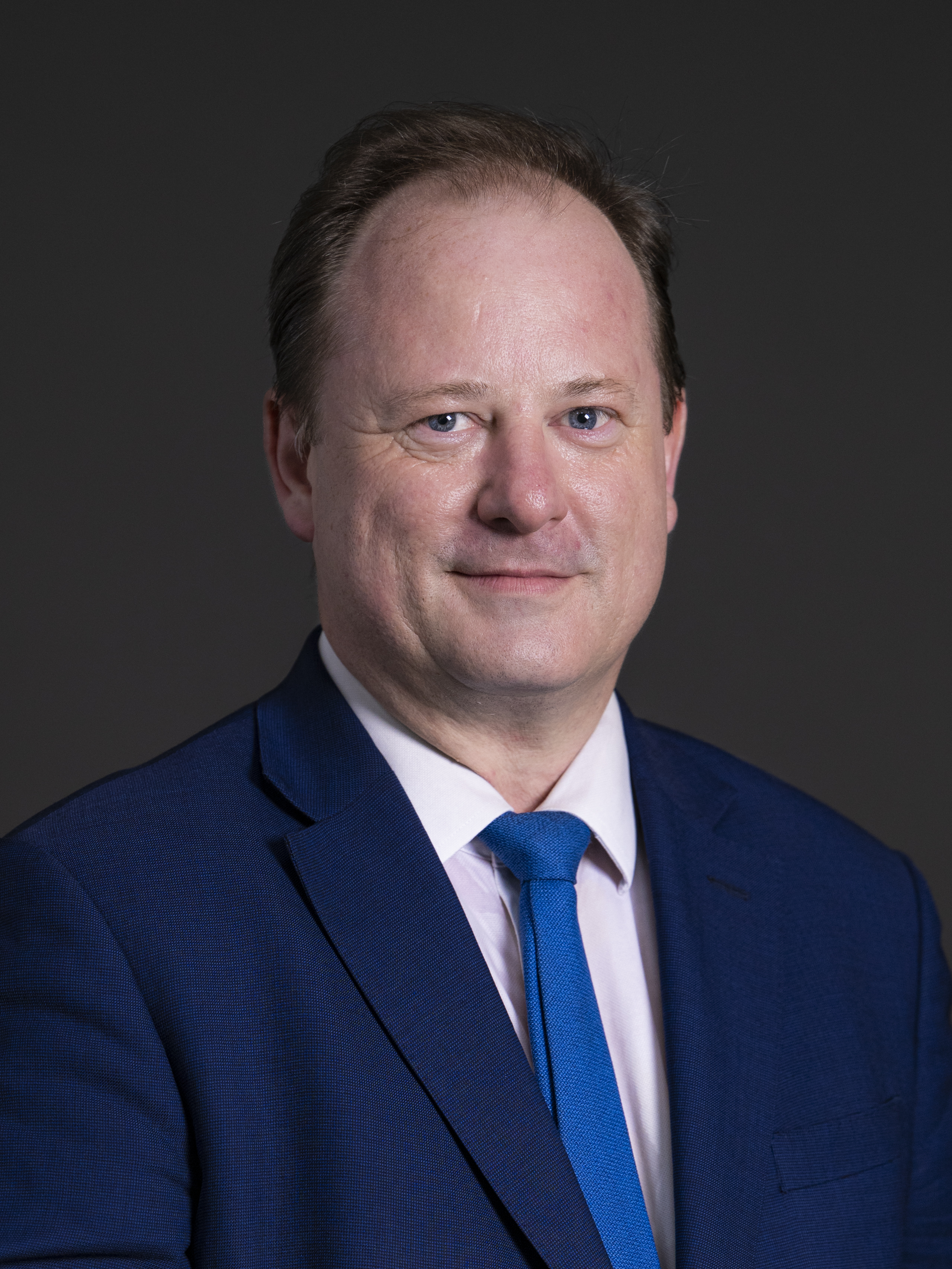
- Official portrait, 2026

Shadow Parliamentary Under-Secretary for Business, Innovation, Science and Trade
- Incumbent
- Assumed office 31 August 2026
- Leader: Kemi Badenoch
- Preceded by: Gareth Davies

Member of Parliament for Bromley and Biggin Hill
- Incumbent
- Assumed office 4 July 2024
- Preceded by: Constituency established
- Majority: 302 (0.6%)

Deputy Leader of the Conservative Party in the London Assembly
- In office 10 May 2021 – 2 May 2023
- Leader: Susan Hall
- Preceded by: Andrew Boff
- Succeeded by: Emma Best

Member of the London Assembly for Bexley and Bromley
- In office 6 May 2021 – 6 May 2024
- Preceded by: Gareth Bacon
- Succeeded by: Thomas Turrell

Personal details
- Born: August 1978 (age 48) Lambeth, London, England
- Party: Conservative

Peter Timothy Fortune (born August 1978) is a British Conservative Party politician who has served as Member of Parliament (MP) for Bromley and Biggin Hill since the 2024 general election.

== Career biography ==
=== Early life ===
Fortune was raised on a council estate in Lambeth and went to Bishop Thomas Grant School in Streatham. After school, he worked in the UK and abroad before moving to Bromley in 2006 to start a family. He then worked at the News Shopper and other Newsquest local press titles while his wife was a teacher at local primary schools.

=== Bromley Council ===
Fortune was elected to Bromley Council as a councillor for Cray Valley East from 2010 to 2014. He was a councillor for Hayes and Coney Hall ward from 2014 to 2022. From 2017 to 2021, he was Deputy Leader of Bromley Council.

=== London Assembly ===
He was the member of the London Assembly (AM) for Bexley and Bromley from 2021 to 2024.

Fortune was elected as Deputy Leader of the London Assembly Conservative Group in May 2021.

=== Parliamentary elections ===
Fortune stood as the Conservative candidate for Lewisham East in the 2015 general election and the 2017 general election receiving 22.3% and 23.0% of the vote respectively and placing second both times behind Labour's Heidi Alexander.

He was the Conservative candidate for Leeds Central in the 2019 general election, receiving 22.6% of the vote and finishing second behind long-term incumbent Hilary Benn.

In March 2024, Fortune was selected as the Conservative candidate for the newly-created constituency of Bromley and Biggin Hill for the 2024 General Election. He was elected with a small majority of 302 votes (0.6%), narrowly edging out the Labour candidate, Oana Olaru-Holmes.

=== Member of Parliament ===
His constituency of Bromley and Biggin Hill is the 6th most marginal Conservative-held seat in the country.

He has been a member of the Public Accounts Committee since October 2024. In the 2024 Conservative Party leadership election which was lasted from July to November 2024 he backed James Cleverly (who was also the London Assembly member for Bexley and Bromley from 2008 to 2016). Kemi Badenoch was the eventual winner of the leadership contest.

In Kemi Badenoch's opposition frontbench he was appointed Parliamentary Private Secretary to the Shadow Secretary of State for Science, Innovation and Technology in November 2024.

On 29 November 2024, he voted against the Terminally Ill Adults (End of Life) Bill in the second reading.

== Electoral history ==
General election 2024: Bromley and Biggin Hill
Party	Candidate	Votes	%	±%
Conservative	Peter Fortune	15,929	34.0	−20.4
Labour	Oana Olaru-Holmes	15,627	33.4	+8.3
Reform	Alan Cook	8,203	17.5	N/A
Liberal Democrats	Julie Ireland	4,352	9.3	−6.7
Green	Caroline Sandes	2,583	5.5	+1.8
Climate	Karen Miller	94	0.2	N/A
Majority		302	0.6	−28.7
Turnout		46,788	66.2	−3.5
Registered electors		70,713		
Conservative hold		Swing	−14.4	

Parliament of the United Kingdom
New constituency	Member of Parliament for Bromley and Biggin Hill; 2024–present	Incumbent
