= Bromley Civic Centre =

Municipal building in London, England

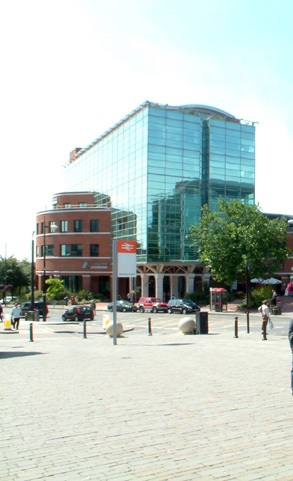
- Bromley Civic Centre

- Shown in Bromley
- 51.3992°N 0.0165°E
- Location: Bromley

History
- Built: 1988

Site notes
- Architectural style: Modern style

Bromley Civic Centre is a municipal building in Westmoreland Road, Bromley, London. The building currently serves as the headquarters of Bromley London Borough Council.

== History ==
The building was commissioned to serve as the administrative headquarters of the insurance business, Churchill Insurance. The site the company selected was on the corner of Westmoreland Road and Bromley High street, just to the south of Bromley South railway station.

The building was designed in the modern style, built in red brick and glass, and was completed in 1988. The layout involved a semi-circular four-storey block, clad in red brick, and a taller tower block, clad in glass, behind. The tower block featured a recessed glass entrance in the northeast corner, accessible from Bromley High Street.

Churchill Insurance was acquired by Royal Bank of Scotland Group in June 2003, and was integrated into Direct Line Group when Direct Line Group was demerged from Royal Bank of Scotland Group in October 2013. The building then became the headquarters of Direct Line Group. In May 2023, Direct Line Group announced that it would be relating to Riverbank House in the City of London. This left Churchill Court vacant and Bromley London Borough Council decided to take the opportunity to sell its Grade II listed offices at Bromley Palace, which needed extensive refurbishment, and acquire Churchill Court instead.

After the completion of an extensive programme of refurbishment works, which included the creation of new public areas, a council chamber and a mayoral suite as well as external landscaping, the council moved into Churchill Court in December 2024. It has said that it intends to rent out any surplus space in its new headquarters.
