= Chelsfield (ward) =

Electoral ward in London, England

- Electoral ward for the Bromley London Borough Council
- Borough: Bromley
- County: Greater London
- Population: 11,234 (2021)
- Major settlements: Chelsfield
- Area: 8.142 km²

Current electoral ward
- Created: 2022
- Councillors: 2
- Created from: Chelsfield and Pratts Bottom

Chelsfield is an electoral ward in the London Borough of Bromley. The ward was first used in the 2022 elections and elects two councillors to Bromley London Borough Council.

A ward of the same name was in use from 1965 to 1978.

== Geography ==
The ward is named after the district of Chelsfield.

== Councillors ==
Election	Councillors	
2022	Mike Botting (Conservative)	Angela Page (Conservative)

== Elections ==
=== 2022 ===
Chelsfield (2 seats)
Party	Candidate	Votes	%	±%
Conservative	Mike Botting*	1,838	51.8	−10.7
Conservative	Angela Page*	1,765	49.7	−9.4
Liberal Democrats	Gerda Loosemore-Reppen	993	28.0	+13.6
Liberal Democrats	Laura Thurimella	772	21.7	+8.5
Labour	Lynn Sellwood	541	15.2	−2.1
Labour	Kola Abiola	524	14.8	−0.7
Green	Daniel Sloan	467	13.2	+0.1
Turnout		3,551	41	
Registered electors		8,720		
Conservative win (new seat)				
Conservative win (new seat)				

== See also ==
- List of electoral wards in Greater London
