= Bromley Common and Holwood =

Electoral ward in the London Borough of Bromley

- Electoral ward for the Bromley London Borough Council
- Bromley Common and Holwood ward boundaries since 2022
- Borough: Bromley
- County: Greater London
- Population: 18,781 (2021) (Note: 2021 Census data reported for 2022 ward boundaries)
- Electorate: 13,949 (2022)
- Area: 6.737 square kilometres (2.601 sq mi)

Current electoral ward
- Created: 2022
- Number of members: 3
- Councillors: David Jefferys; Sunil Gupta; Alan Cook
- Created from: Bromley Common and Keston, Bromley Town, Farnborough and Crofton
- GSS code: E05013990

Bromley Common and Holwood is an electoral ward in the London Borough of Bromley. The ward was first used in the 2022 elections. It returns three councillors to Bromley London Borough Council.

== List of councillors ==
Term	Councillor	Party
2022–present	David Jefferys	Conservative
2022–2025	Jonathan Laidlaw (Note: Jonathan Laidlaw changed parties in 2023.)	Conservative
2022–2025	Jonathan Laidlaw	Independent
2022–present	Sunil Gupta	Conservative
2025–present	Alan Cook	Reform

== Bromley council elections ==
=== 2025 by-election ===
The by-election took place on 24 July 2025, following the death of Jonathan Laidlaw.

2025 Bromley Common and Holwood by-election
Party	Candidate	Votes	%	±%
Reform	Alan Cook	1,342	33.99	New
Conservative	Ian Payne	1,161	29.41	−15.59
Labour	Elizabeth Morgan	720	18.24	−10.86
Liberal Democrats	Laura McCracken	540	13.68	−2.39
Greens	Ruth Fabricant	185	4.69	−11.81
Turnout		3,948	28	−4
Reform gain from Conservative		Swing	+24.96	

=== 2022 election ===
The election took place on 5 May 2022.

2022 Bromley London Borough Council election: Bromley Common and Holwood
Party	Candidate	Votes	%	±%
Conservative	David Jefferys	2,114	47.1	−12.2
Conservative	Jonathan Laidlaw	2,019	45.0	−14.4
Conservative	Sunil Gupta	1,927	42.9	−14.8
Labour	Kay Abbs	1,470	32.8	+9.9
Labour	Kathryn Watts	1,245	27.7	+5.9
Labour	Amy de Vries	1,202	26.8	+5.9
Liberal Democrats	Alan Carter	813	18.1	+6.4
Liberal Democrats	Carol Denyer	794	17.7	+6.5
Green	Hannah Witham	739	16.5	+4.1
Liberal Democrats	Andrew Viner	559	12.5	+3.3
Turnout		4,488	32	
Registered electors		13,949		
Conservative win (new seat)				
Conservative win (new seat)				
Conservative win (new seat)				
