= Bromley Town =

Electoral ward in London, England

- Electoral ward for the Bromley London Borough Council
- Borough: Bromley
- County: Greater London
- Population: 15,400 (2021)
- Major settlements: Bromley
- Area: 2.793 km²

Current electoral ward
- Created: 2002
- Councillors: 3

Bromley Town is an electoral ward in the London Borough of Bromley. The ward was first used in the 2002 elections and elects three councillors to Bromley London Borough Council.

== Geography ==
The ward is named after the town of Bromley in south-east London.

== Councillors ==
Election	Councillors		
2002	Paul Clark (Conservative)	Denise Reddin (Conservative)	Martyn Reddin (Conservative)
2006	David Hastings (Conservative)	Christopher Phillips (Conservative)	Stephen Maly (Conservative)
2010	David Hastings (Conservative)	Will Harmer (Conservative)	Diana McMull (Conservative)
2014	Nicky Dykes (Conservative)	Will Harmer (Conservative)	Michael Rutherford (Conservative)
2018	Nicky Dykes (Conservative)	Will Harmer (Conservative)	Michael Rutherford (Conservative)
2022	Julie Ireland (Liberal Democrats)	Sam Webber (Liberal Democrats)	Graeme Casey (Liberal Democrats)

== Elections ==
=== 2022 ===
Bromley Town (3 seats)
Party	Candidate	Votes	%	±%
Liberal Democrats	Julie Ireland	1,929	44.8	+11.7
Liberal Democrats	Sam Webber	1,834	42.6	+9.5
Liberal Democrats	Graeme Casey	1,828	42.5	+8.2
Conservative	Nicky Dykes*	1,475	34.3	−5.5
Conservative	Michael Rutherford*	1,430	33.2	−1.9
Conservative	Will Harmer*	1,417	32.9	−4.6
Labour	Will Conway	735	17.1	−6.9
Labour	Larry Awobayiku	720	16.7	−6.7
Labour	Jez Frampton	652	15.1	−5.3
Green	Ann Garrett	512	11.9	+0.0
Turnout		4,304	38	
Registered electors		11,353		
Liberal Democrats win (new seat)				
Liberal Democrats win (new seat)				
Liberal Democrats win (new seat)				

=== 2018 ===
Bromley Town
Party	Candidate	Votes	%	±%
Conservative	Nicky Dykes	2,129	39.8	−3.6
Conservative	Will Harmer	2,008	37.5	−4.1
Conservative	Michael Rutherford	1,878	35.1	−3.7
Liberal Democrats	Rhian Kanat	1,835	34.3	+22.7
Liberal Democrats	Julie Ireland	1,772	33.1	+21.9
Liberal Democrats	Sam Webber	1,653	30.9	+20.2
Labour	Juliet Kay	1,285	24.0	+0.6
Labour	Glyn Alsworth	1,254	23.4	+0.9
Labour	Josie Parkhouse	1,094	20.4	+1.0
Green	Roisin Robertson	639	11.9	−3.0
Turnout		15,547	40	
Registered electors		13,275		
Conservative hold		Swing		
Conservative hold		Swing		
Conservative hold		Swing		

=== 2014 ===
Bromley Town (3 seats)
Party	Candidate	Votes	%	±%
Conservative	Nicola Dykes	2,099	43.4	
Conservative	William Harmer	1,993	41.4	
Conservative	Michael Rutherford	1,867	38.8	
Labour	Marcus Oliver	1,126	23.4	
Labour	Richard Cormaish	1,083	22.5	
Labour	Rubina Sutton	934	19.4	
UKIP	Derek Bryan	823	17.1	
UKIP	Peter Thompson	803	16.7	
Green	Mary Ion	716	14.9	
UKIP	Anthony Van Der Elst	677	14.1	
Liberal Democrats	Colin England	558	11.6	
Liberal Democrats	Michael Berridge	541	11.2	
Liberal Democrats	Martin Cooper	515	10.7	
Turnout		4818	37.48	
Conservative hold		Swing		
Conservative hold		Swing		
Conservative hold		Swing		

=== 2010 ===
Bromley Town (3)
Party	Candidate	Votes	%	±%
Conservative	William Harmer	3,816	41.5	
Conservative	David Hastings	3,784		
Conservative	Diana MacMull	3,359		
Liberal Democrats	Sheila Blackburn	2,059	22.4	
Liberal Democrats	Martin Cooper	1,897		
Labour	Robert Armstrong	1,826	19.9	
Liberal Democrats	Jennifer Hawke	1,755		
Labour	Michael Gibson	1,686		
Labour	Marcus Oliver	1,527		
Green	Ann Garrett	877	9.5	
UKIP	Emmett Jenner	612	6.7	
Turnout		8,467	66.7	
Conservative hold		Swing		
Conservative hold		Swing		
Conservative hold		Swing		

=== 2006 ===
Bromley Town (3)
Party	Candidate	Votes	%	±%
Conservative	Stephen Maly	2,190	46.7	
Conservative	David Hastings	2,157		
Conservative	Christopher Phillips	2,083		
Liberal Democrats	Peter Brooks	1,570	33.5	
Liberal Democrats	David Dear	1,429		
Liberal Democrats	Timothy Sowter	1,372		
Green	Simon Anstey	478	10.2	
Labour	Robert Armstrong	447	9.5	
Green	Alison Scammell	438		
Green	Jacob Gordon	431		
Labour	Michael Gibson	406		
Labour	Richard Comaish	376		
Turnout			39.0	
Conservative hold		Swing		
Conservative hold		Swing		
Conservative hold		Swing		

== See also ==
- List of electoral wards in Greater London
