= Shortlands and Park Langley =

- Electoral ward for the Bromley London Borough Council
- Shortlands and Park Langley ward boundaries since 2022
- Borough: Bromley
- County: Greater London
- Population: 16,207 (2021) (Note: 2021 Census data reported for 2022 ward boundaries)
- Electorate: 12,497 (2022)
- Area: 3.862 square kilometres (1.491 sq mi)

Current electoral ward
- Created: 2022
- Councillors: 3
- GSS code: E05014005

Shortlands and Park Langley is an electoral ward in the London Borough of Bromley. The ward was first used in the 2022 elections. It returns three councillors to Bromley London Borough Council.

== List of councillors ==
Term	Councillor	Party
2022–present	Felicity Bainbridge	Conservative
2022–2024	Aisha Cuthbert	Conservative
2022–present	Adam Grant	Conservative
2024–present	Gemma Turrell	Conservative

== Bromley council elections ==
=== 2024 by-election ===
The by-election was held on 2 May 2024. It took place on the same day as the 2024 London mayoral election, the 2024 London Assembly election and 14 other borough council by-elections across London.

2024 Shortlands and Park Langley by-election
Party	Candidate	Votes	%	±%
Conservative	Gemma Turrell	2,835		
Labour	Charlotte Grievson	2,005		
Liberal Democrats	Gita Bapat	836		
Reform	Edward Apostolides	417		
Green	Louis Goddard-Glen	374		
Independent	Brendan Donegan	219		
Turnout				
Conservative hold		Swing		

=== 2022 election ===
The election took place on 5 May 2022.

2022 Bromley London Borough Council election: Shortlands and Park Langley
Party	Candidate	Votes	%	±%
Conservative	Felicity Bainbridge	2,262	46.4	
Conservative	Aisha Cuthbert	2,151	44.1	−15.1
Conservative	Adam Grant	2,110	43.3	
Labour	Joanna Crispin	1,542	31.6	
Labour	Peter Ayres	1,515	31.1	
Labour	Martin Spence	1,306	26.8	
Liberal Democrats	Andy Coleman	1,078	22.1	
Liberal Democrats	Stephen Wells	980	20.1	
Liberal Democrats	Suraj Gandecha	976	20.0	
Reform	Edward Apostolides	156	3.2	
Turnout		4,874	39	
Registered electors		12,497		
Conservative win (new seat)				
Conservative win (new seat)				
Conservative win (new seat)				
