= Plaistow (Bromley ward) =

Electoral ward in London, England

- Electoral ward for the Bromley London Borough Council
- Borough: Bromley
- County: Greater London
- Population: 13,478 (2021)
- Major settlements: Plaistow
- Area: 3.337 km²

Current electoral ward
- Created: 2022
- Councillors: 2

Plaistow is an electoral ward in the London Borough of Bromley. The ward was first used in the 2022 elections and elects two councillors to Bromley London Borough Council.

== Geography ==
The ward is named after the district of Plaistow.

== Councillors ==
Election	Councillors	
2022	Alisa Igoe (Labour)	Tony McPartlan (Labour)

== Elections ==
=== 2022 ===
Plaistow (New) (2 seats)
Party	Candidate	Votes	%	±%
Labour	Alisa Igoe	1,566	44.5	
Labour	Tony McPartlan	1,514	43.0	
Conservative	Panos Papayannakos	1,390	39.5	
Conservative	Gary Stevens*	1,353	38.4	
Liberal Democrats	Alison Davis	344	9.8	
Green	Heather Wallace-Brown	316	9.0	
Liberal Democrats	Peter Furniss	297	8.4	−1.3
Independent	Alice Akullu	80	2.3	
Turnout		3,522	38	
Registered electors		9,383		
Labour win (new seat)				
Labour win (new seat)				

== See also ==
- List of electoral wards in Greater London
