= Bromley London Borough Council =

Local authority in London, England

- Coat of arms

- Council logo

Type
- Type: London borough council of the London Borough of Bromley
- Houses: Unicameral

Leadership
- Mayor: Christine Harris, Conservative since 18 May 2026
- Leader: Colin Smith, Conservative since 25 September 2017
- Chief Executive: Ade Adetosoye since December 2018

Structure
- Seats: 58 councillors
- Political groups: Administration (35) Conservative (35) Other parties (23) Labour (8) Liberal Democrats (6) Reform (5) Chislehurst Matters (3) Independent (1)
- Length of term: Whole council elected every four years

Elections
- Voting system: Plurality at-large (FPTP)
- Last election: 7 May 2026
- Next election: 2030

Meeting place
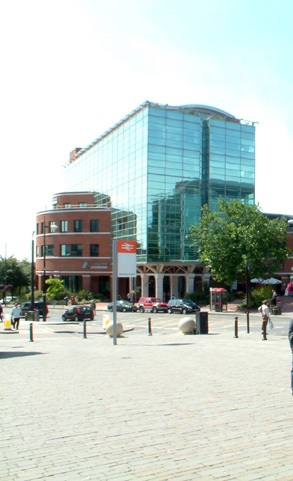
- Bromley Civic Centre, Churchill Court, 2 Westmoreland Road, Bromley, BR1 1AS

Website
- www.bromley.gov.uk

Bromley London Borough Council, also known as Bromley Council, is the local authority for the London Borough of Bromley in Greater London, England. The council has been under Conservative majority control since 2001. It is based at the Civic Centre on Westmoreland Road, Bromley. The council is responsible for providing a range of services within the borough.

== History ==
There has been a Bromley local authority since 1867 when the parish of Bromley was made a local government district, governed by an elected local board. Such districts were reconstituted as urban districts under the Local Government Act 1894, which saw the board replaced by an urban district council. Bromley Urban District was incorporated to become a municipal borough in 1903, governed by a body formally called the "Mayor, Aldermen and Burgesses of the Borough of Bromley", generally known as the corporation, borough council or town council.

The much larger London Borough of Bromley and its council were created under the London Government Act 1963, with the first election held in 1964. For its first year the council acted as a shadow authority alongside the area's five outgoing authorities, being the borough councils of Bromley and Beckenham and the urban district councils of Orpington, Penge and Chislehurst and Sidcup (the latter in respect of the Chislehurst area only; the Sidcup area went to the London Borough of Bexley). The new council formally came into its powers on 1 April 1965, at which point the old districts and their councils were abolished.

The council's full legal name is "The Mayor and Burgesses of the London Borough of Bromley".

From 1965 until 1986 the council was a lower-tier authority, with upper-tier functions provided by the Greater London Council. The split of powers and functions meant that the Greater London Council was responsible for "wide area" services such as fire, ambulance, flood prevention, and refuse disposal; with the boroughs (including Bromley) responsible for "personal" services such as social care, libraries, cemeteries and refuse collection. As an outer London borough council Bromley has been a local education authority since 1965. The Greater London Council was abolished in 1986 and its functions passed to the London Boroughs, with some services provided through joint committees.

Since 2000 the Greater London Authority has taken some responsibility for highways and planning control from the council, but within the English local government system the council remains a "most purpose" authority in terms of the available range of powers and functions.

== Powers and functions ==
The local authority derives its powers and functions from the London Government Act 1963 and subsequent legislation, and has the powers and functions of a London borough council. It sets council tax and as a billing authority it also collects precepts for Greater London Authority functions and business rates. It sets planning policies which complement Greater London Authority and national policies, and decides on almost all planning applications accordingly. It is also the local education authority.

== Political control ==
The council has been under Conservative majority control since 2001.

The first election to the council was held in 1964, initially operating as a shadow authority alongside the outgoing authorities until the new arrangements came into effect on 1 April 1965. Political control of the council since 1965 has been as follows:

Party in control	Years
Conservative	1965–1998
No overall control	1998–2001
Conservative	2001–present

=== Leadership ===
The role of mayor is largely ceremonial in Bromley. Political leadership is instead provided by the leader of the council. The leaders since 1967 have been:

Councillor	Party	From	To	Notes
Michael Neubert	Conservative	1967	1971	
Horace Walter Haden	Conservative	1971	1972	
Dennis Barkway	Conservative	1972	1976	
Simon Randall	Conservative	1976	1981	
Dennis Barkway	Conservative	1981	1996	
Frank Cooke	Conservative	1996	1997	
Michael Tickner	Conservative	1997	1998	
Chris Maines	Liberal Democrats	1998	1999	Joint leaders
Sue Polydorou	Labour	1998	1999	Joint leaders
Chris Maines	Liberal Democrats	1999	2001	Joint leaders
John Holbrook	Labour	1999	2001	Joint leaders
Michael Tickner	Conservative	2001	2003	
Russell Mellor	Conservative	2003	2004	
Stephen Carr	Conservative	2004	15 Sep 2017	
Colin Smith	Conservative	25 Sep 2017		

== Elections ==
Since the last boundary changes in 2022 the council has comprised 58 councillors representing 22 wards, with each ward electing one, two or three councillors. Elections are held every four years.

Following the 2026 election, the composition of the council is:

Party	Councillors
Conservative	35
Labour	8
Liberal Democrats	6
Reform	5
Independent & Other	4
Total	58

The next election is due in May 2030.

== Wards ==
The wards of Bromley and the number of seats:

1. Beckenham Town & Copers Cope (3)
2. Bickley & Sundridge (3)
3. Biggin Hill (2)
4. Bromley Common & Holwood (3)
5. Bromley Town (3)
6. Chelsfield (2)
7. Chislehurst (3)
8. Clock House (3)
9. Crystal Palace & Anerley (2)
10. Darwin (1)
11. Farnborough & Crofton (3)
12. Hayes & Coney Hall (3)
13. Kelsey & Eden Park (3)
14. Mottingham (3)
15. Orpington (2)
16. Penge & Cator (3)
17. Petts Wood & Knoll (3)
18. Plaistow (2)
19. Shortlands & Park Langley (3)
20. St Mary Cray (3)
21. St Paul's Cray (3)
22. West Wickham (3)

== Premises ==
The council is based at Bromley Civic Centre at Churchill Court, opposite Bromley South railway station. The civic centre was built in 1988 as the headquarters of Churchill Insurance, part of Direct Line Group. The council moved into the building in December 2024.

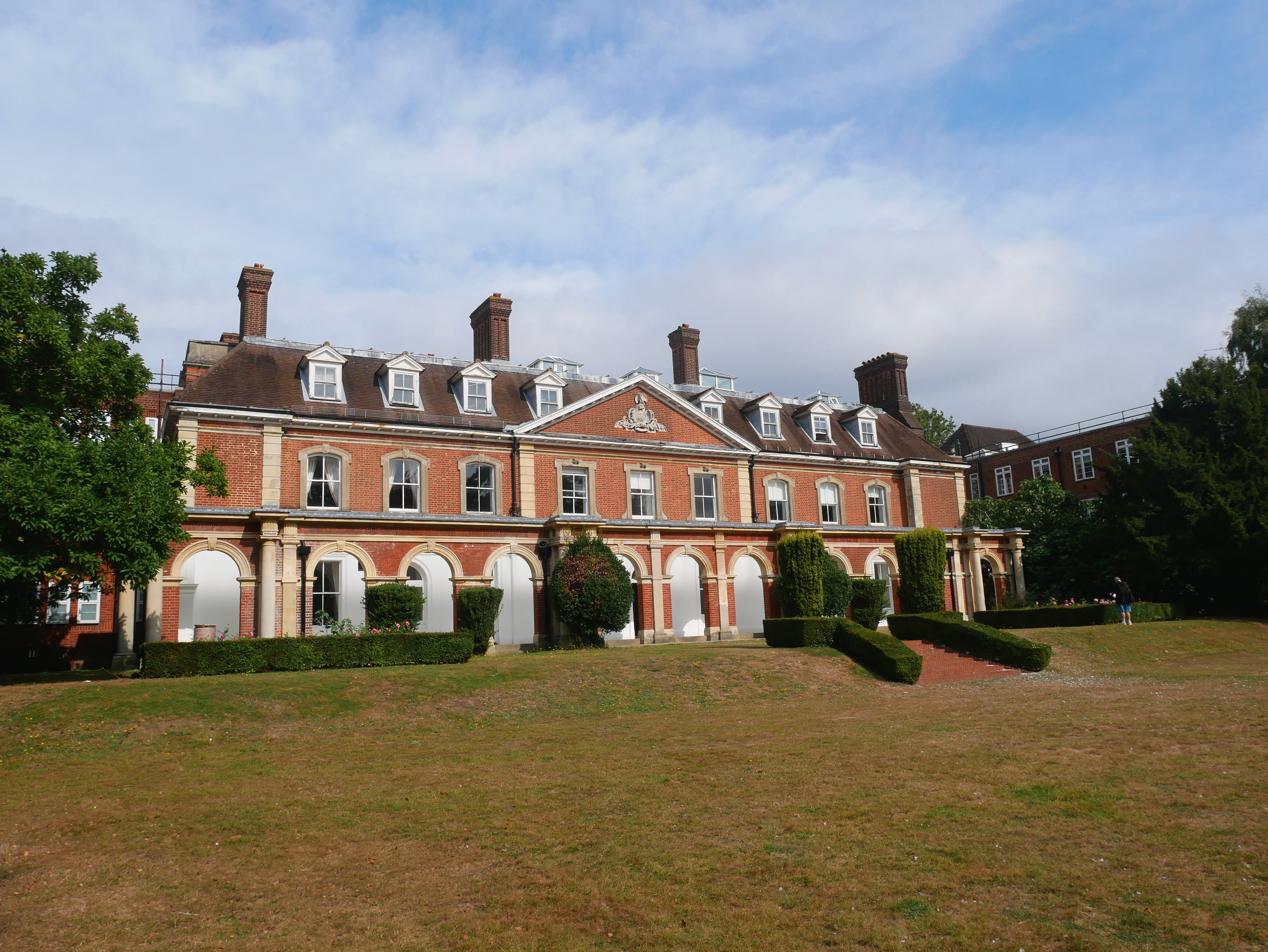
Bromley Palace, council's headquarters 1982–2024

Until 1982, the council was based at Bromley Town Hall on Tweedy Road, which had been built for the old Bromley Borough Council in 1906. Between 1982 and 2024 the council was based at Bromley Palace on Stockwell Close. Bromley Palace had belonged to the Bishop of Rochester from Norman times. The main house was built in 1775, replacing an earlier building of 1184. The council acquired the building in the early 1980s and built a large extension, moving into the enlarged complex in 1982.
