= 2018 Bromley London Borough Council election =

2018 local election in England

- 3 May 2018

All 60 seats to Bromley London Borough Council 31 seats needed for a majority

	First party	Second party
Party	Conservative	Labour
Last election	51 seats, 39.6%	7 seats, 18.3%
Seats won	50	8
Seat change	▼1	▲1
Popular vote	47,777	26,295
Percentage	44.1%	24.3%
Swing	▲4.5%	▲5.9%
- Map of the results. Conservative Party in blue, Labour Party in red and independents in grey.
Council control before election
Conservative
Council control after election
Conservative

The 2018 Bromley London Borough Council election took place on 3 May 2018 to elect members of Bromley London Borough Council in England. This was the same day as other local elections.

Bromley was one of the boroughs subject to a trial of voter ID restrictions requiring the production of photographic ID or 2 other forms of ID.

== Council results ==
2018 Bromley Council election
Party	Candidates						Votes		
Party	Stood	Elected	Gained	Unseated	Net	% of total	%	No.	Net %
Conservative	60	50	2	3	-1	83.3	44.1	47,777	+4.5
Labour	60	8	1	0	+1	13.3	24.3	26,295	+5.9
Liberal Democrats	60	0	0	0	0	0.0	14.7	15,896	+5.6
Green	23	0	0	0	0	0.0	10.6	11,460	-1.0
UKIP	19	0	0	2	-2	0.0	2.8	3,065	-17.0
Independent	3	2	2	0	+2	3.3	3.0	3,162	+2.0
Women's Equality	1	0	0	0	0	0.0	0.4	440	New
For Britain	1	0	0	0	0	0.0	0.1	142	New
Libertarian	1	0	0	0	0	0.0	0.1	60	New

== Ward results ==
=== Bickley ===
Bickley
Party	Candidate	Votes	%	±%
Conservative	Kira Gabbert	2,935	58.3	+3.7
Conservative	Kate Lymer	2,919	58.0	+4.2
Conservative	Colin Smith	2,827	56.2	+2.5
Labour	Jann Oliver	1,022	20.3	+6.7
Liberal Democrats	Helen Corbett	897	17.8	+10.2
Labour	Mike Roberts	805	16.0	+2.8
Liberal Democrats	David Martin	753	15.0	+8.1
Labour	Martin Spence	744	14.8	+1.9
Liberal Democrats	David Wilkinson	697	13.9	+7.6
Green	Roger Austin	630	12.5	+3.2
UKIP	David Quarterman	225	4.5	−12.4
Turnout		14,454	43	
Registered electors		11,678		
Conservative hold		Swing		
Conservative hold		Swing		
Conservative hold		Swing		

=== Biggin Hill ===
Biggin Hill
Party	Candidate	Votes	%	±%
Independent	Julian Bennington	1,175	37.7	New
Independent	Melanie Stevens	1,149	36.8	New
Conservative	Linda Hewitt	929	29.8	−21.2
Conservative	Toby Sims	848	27.2	−12.4
UKIP	Julian Grainger	360	11.5	New
Liberal Democrats	Geoff Gostt	336	10.8	−4.7
UKIP	Emmett Jenner	301	9.7	−26.9
Labour	Timothy Fisher	242	7.8	−1.9
Labour	Clive Gunby	224	7.2	+4.0
Green	Karen Wheller	205	6.6	−2.7
Green	Paul Enock	182	5.8	New
Liberal Democrats	Graeme Casey	171	5.5	−7.7
Turnout		6,122	40	
Registered electors		7,839		
Independent gain from Conservative		Swing		
Independent gain from Conservative		Swing		

=== Bromley Common and Keston ===
Bromley Common and Keston
Party	Candidate	Votes	%	±%
Conservative	Alexa Michael	2,718	59.4	+10.8
Conservative	David Jefferys	2,714	59.3	+10.3
Conservative	Robert McIlveen	2,638	57.7	+10.3
Labour	Robert Evans	1,048	22.9	+5.3
Labour	Eileen Welsh	996	21.8	+4.5
Labour	Brian Ingham	957	20.9	+7.2
Green	Hannah Whitman	568	12.4	−2.5
Liberal Democrats	Alan Carter	537	11.7	+4.5
Liberal Democrats	Clive Broadhurst	514	11.2	+5.5
Liberal Democrats	Christopher Bentley	421	9.2	New
Turnout		13,174	36	
Registered electors		12,682		
Conservative hold		Swing		
Conservative hold		Swing		
Conservative hold		Swing		

=== Bromley Town ===
Bromley Town
Party	Candidate	Votes	%	±%
Conservative	Nicky Dykes	2,129	39.8	−3.6
Conservative	Will Harmer	2,008	37.5	−4.1
Conservative	Michael Rutherford	1,878	35.1	−3.7
Liberal Democrats	Rhian Kanat	1,835	34.3	+22.7
Liberal Democrats	Julie Ireland	1,772	33.1	+21.9
Liberal Democrats	Sam Webber	1,653	30.9	+20.2
Labour	Juliet Kay	1,285	24.0	+0.6
Labour	Glyn Alsworth	1,254	23.4	+0.9
Labour	Josie Parkhouse	1,094	20.4	+1.0
Green	Roisin Robertson	639	11.9	−3.0
Turnout		15,547	40	
Registered electors		13,275		
Conservative hold		Swing		
Conservative hold		Swing		
Conservative hold		Swing		

=== Chelsfield and Pratts Bottom ===
Chelsfield and Pratts Bottom
Party	Candidate	Votes	%	±%
Conservative	Mike Botting	2,928	62.5	+16.3
Conservative	Angela Page	2,770	59.1	+16.1
Conservative	Samaris Huntington-Thresher	2,715	57.9	+13.6
Labour	Margaret Mills	809	17.3	+5.6
Labour	Stephen Richardson	748	16.0	+5.7
Labour	Peter Moore	726	15.5	+6.1
Liberal Democrats	Gerda Loosemore-Reppen	674	14.4	+4.9
Liberal Democrats	John Bray	620	13.2	+4.3
Green	Daniel Sloan	616	13.1	+2.3
Liberal Democrats	Jonathan Webber	434	9.3	+2.0
UKIP	Michael Porter	246	5.2	−26.9
UKIP	Brian Philp	244	5.2	−23.8
Turnout		13,530	42	
Registered electors		11,142		
Conservative hold		Swing		
Conservative hold		Swing		
Conservative hold		Swing		

=== Chislehurst ===
Chislehurst
Party	Candidate	Votes	%	±%
Conservative	Katy Boughey	3,094	66.7	+6.3
Conservative	Kieran Terry	2,900	62.5	+3.5
Conservative	Suraj Sharma	2,784	60.0	+14.4
Labour	Christian Mole	901	19.4	+4.8
Labour	Mick Maroney	748	16.1	+1.3
Labour	Eugene Nixon	660	14.2	−0.6
Green	Stella Gardiner	642	13.8	+0.8
Liberal Democrats	Ian Magrath	607	13.1	+6.5
Liberal Democrats	Robert Cliff	507	10.9	+3.3
Liberal Democrats	Simon Lewis	436	9.4	+3.8
Turnout		13,279	39	
Registered electors		12,012		
Conservative hold		Swing		
Conservative hold		Swing		
Conservative hold		Swing		

=== Clock House ===
Clock House
Party	Candidate	Votes	%	±%
Labour	Vanessa Allen	2,638	48.4	+8.5
Labour	Ian Dunn	2,386	43.8	+10.5
Labour	Josh King	2,254	41.4	+8.7
Conservative	Christopher Phillips	1,470	27.0	−7.0
Conservative	Christine Harris	1,407	25.8	−6.1
Conservative	Scott Pattenden	1,328	24.4	−4.0
Liberal Democrats	Juliet Corbett	1,218	22.4	+6.0
Liberal Democrats	Michael Jones	1,197	22.0	+10.0
Liberal Democrats	Adam Bambrough	1,151	21.1	+11.3
Green	Nicola Nugent	704	12.9	−5.6
Turnout		15,753	46	
Registered electors		11,880		
Labour hold		Swing		
Labour hold		Swing		
Labour gain from Conservative		Swing		

=== Copers Cope ===
Copers Cope
Party	Candidate	Votes	%	±%
Conservative	Michael Tickner	2,291	40.7	−12.0
Conservative	Stephen Wells	2,245	39.9	−11.2
Conservative	Russell Mellor	2,125	37.8	−10.1
Liberal Democrats	Alison Davis	1,785	31.7	+19.0
Liberal Democrats	Chloe-Jane Ross	1,680	29.9	New
Liberal Democrats	Rich Wilsher	1,516	26.9	New
Labour	Charlotte Gerada	1,333	23.7	−0.6
Labour	Tony McPartlan	1,238	22.0	+0.5
Labour	Olasupo Obikoya	1,178	20.9	+0.1
Green	Ruth Fabricant	642	11.4	−9.0
UKIP	Andrew Hayman	133	2.4	−16.7
UKIP	Graham Reakes	115	2.0	New
Turnout		16,281	45	
Registered electors		12,551		
Conservative hold		Swing		
Conservative hold		Swing		
Conservative hold		Swing		

=== Cray Valley East ===
Cray Valley East
Party	Candidate	Votes	%	±%
Conservative	Chris Pierce	1,619	44.6	+14.6
Conservative	Yvonne Bear	1,601	44.1	+13.0
Conservative	Harry Stranger	1,446	39.9	+9.5
Labour	Nathaniel Arthur	1,363	37.6	+16.1
Labour	Christopher Taylor	1,224	33.7	+14.6
Labour	Gillian Davis	1,178	32.5	+14.9
Green	Paul Hemingway	365	10.1	New
UKIP	Mick Greenhough	363	10.0	−20.0
UKIP	Ayse Smith	337	9.3	New
Liberal Democrats	Caitlin Bishop	308	8.5	−12.1
Liberal Democrats	Martin Cooper	238	6.6	−15.6
Liberal Democrats	Rhianna Wilsher	221	6.1	−12.7
Turnout		10,263	32	
Registered electors		11,457		
Conservative hold		Swing		
Conservative hold		Swing		
Conservative hold		Swing		

=== Cray Valley West ===
Cray Valley West
Party	Candidate	Votes	%	±%
Conservative	Judi Ellis	1,465	41.9	+15.0
Conservative	Colin Hitchins	1,365	39.1	+12.3
Conservative	Gary Ernest Stevens	1,228	35.1	+13.4
Labour	Kelly Galvin	973	27.8	+5.5
Labour	Gary John Stevens	838	24.0	+2.8
Independent	Colin Willetts	838	24.0	−2.0
Labour	Richard Lovell	809	23.1	+2.6
UKIP	David Livett	480	13.7	−15.9
UKIP	Garry Ramus	394	11.3	−17.3
Green	Steven Cope	387	11.1	+3.7
Liberal Democrats	Katharine Barker	366	10.5	+4.7
Liberal Democrats	Magdalena Williams	298	8.5	+3.2
Liberal Democrats	Peter Scott Brooks	190	5.4	+0.4
Libertarian	Sean Finch	60	1.7	New
Turnout		9,691	29	
Registered electors		12,097		
Conservative hold		Swing		
Conservative gain from UKIP		Swing		
Conservative gain from UKIP		Swing		

=== Crystal Palace ===
Crystal Palace
Party	Candidate	Votes	%	±%
Labour	Angela Wilkins	1,985	63.0	+17.4
Labour	Marina Ahmad	1,755	55.7	+18.5
Green	Mark Phillippo	536	17.0	−1.6
Liberal Democrats	Philippa Bridge	527	16.7	−10.4
Conservative	Craig Wilson	442	14.0	+2.6
Conservative	Sunil Gupta	421	13.4	+4.4
Liberal Democrats	David Marshall	309	9.8	−15.0
Turnout		5,975	35	
Registered electors		9,082		
Labour hold		Swing		
Labour hold		Swing		

=== Darwin ===
Darwin
Party	Candidate	Votes	%	±%
Conservative	Richard Scoates	1,201	72.8	+22.0
Labour	Frank Evans	185	11.2	+4.3
Liberal Democrats	Millicent Scott Brooks	133	8.1	+4.8
Green	Jan Wilson	130	7.9	+3.3
Turnout		1,649	40.0	
Registered electors		4,123		
Conservative hold		Swing		

=== Farnborough and Crofton ===
Farnborough and Crofton
Party	Candidate	Votes	%	±%
Conservative	Robert Evans	3,276	64.3	+6.1
Conservative	Charles Joel	3,208	62.9	+5.6
Conservative	Christopher Marlow	2,987	58.6	+4.5
Liberal Democrats	Ian Catchpole	810	15.9	+8.0
Labour	Malcolm Clark	789	15.5	+1.8
Liberal Democrats	Allan Tweddle	776	15.2	New
Labour	Christine McNamara	744	14.6	+2.3
Liberal Democrats	Oliver Loosemore	683	13.4	New
Labour	John Pead	619	12.1	+0.8
Green	Tamara Galloway	449	8.8	−3.4
UKIP	Kenneth Tracey	295	5.8	−16.2
For Britain	Mandy Baldwin	142	2.8	New
Turnout		14,778	44	
Registered electors		11,648		
Conservative hold		Swing		
Conservative hold		Swing		
Conservative hold		Swing		

=== Hayes and Coney Hall ===
Hayes and Coney Hall
Party	Candidate	Votes	%	±%
Conservative	Graham Arthur	3,096	60.4	+4.1
Conservative	Peter Fortune	3,087	60.2	+13.2
Conservative	Neil Reddin	2,830	55.2	+7.6
Labour	Peter Ayres	950	18.5	+1.8
Labour	Gail Emerson	950	18.5	+4.7
Labour	Glenys Ingham	918	17.9	+7.6
Liberal Democrats	Ellen Griffiths	733	14.3	+4.8
Green	Mary Ion	621	12.1	−1.7
Liberal Democrats	Tudor Griffiths	559	10.9	−3.8
Liberal Democrats	Michael Fox	535	10.4	New
UKIP	Michael Rudd	261	5.1	−20.5
UKIP	Sandra Pearson	243	4.7	−19.2
Turnout		14,783	41	
Registered electors		12,604		
Conservative hold		Swing		
Conservative hold		Swing		
Conservative hold		Swing		

=== Kelsey and Eden Park ===
Kelsey and Eden Park
Party	Candidate	Votes	%	±%
Conservative	Peter Dean	2,563	49.4	−3.6
Conservative	Diane Smith	2,532	48.8	−2.2
Conservative	Dave Wibberley	2,412	46.5	−8.2
Labour	Marie Bardsley	1,579	30.4	+7.0
Labour	Naresh Chauhan	1,462	28.2	+8.0
Labour	John Dempster	1,358	26.2	+8.4
Liberal Democrats	Hayley Anderson	859	16.6	+1.8
Liberal Democrats	Taylor Matthews	675	13.0	+2.3
Liberal Democrats	Robert Jackson	670	12.9	New
Green	Gareth Thomas	553	10.7	New
UKIP	Valerie Butcher	214	4.1	−17.2
Turnout		14,877	42	
Registered electors		12,334		
Conservative hold		Swing		
Conservative hold		Swing		
Conservative hold		Swing		

=== Mottingham and Chislehurst North ===
Mottingham and Chislehurst North
Party	Candidate	Votes	%	±%
Conservative	David Cartwright	1,111	45.7	+6.1
Conservative	Will Rowlands	992	40.8	+7.6
Labour	Nick Harrison	972	40.0	+14.9
Labour	Kathy Smith	969	39.8	+17.1
Green	Kate Matos	223	9.2	−1.3
Liberal Democrats	Victoria Webber	185	7.6	+2.7
Liberal Democrats	John Houghton	171	7.0	New
Turnout		4,623	33.4	
Registered electors		7,306		
Conservative hold		Swing		
Conservative hold		Swing		

=== Orpington ===
Orpington
Party	Candidate	Votes	%	±%
Conservative	Kim Botting	2,857	62.1	+12.4
Conservative	Pauline Tunnicliffe	2,729	59.3	+10.6
Conservative	William Huntington-Thresher	2,694	58.6	+10.3
Labour	Christopher Price	949	20.6	+6.0
Labour	Vibeke Fussing	947	20.6	+7.5
Labour	Gareth Wretham	805	17.5	+6.5
Liberal Democrats	Michael Hall	674	14.7	+3.7
Liberal Democrats	Elaine Mackay	598	13.0	+4.3
Green	Michael Marriott	507	11.0	−2.4
Liberal Democrats	Reinhard Rometsch	430	9.3	+3.7
Turnout		13,190	38	
Registered electors		12,110		
Conservative hold		Swing		
Conservative hold		Swing		
Conservative hold		Swing		

=== Penge and Cator ===
Penge and Cator
Party	Candidate	Votes	%	±%
Labour	Kathy Bance	3,259	65.9	+11.5
Labour	Kevin Brooks	2,828	57.1	+7.5
Labour	Simon Jeal	2,692	54.4	+7.3
Conservative	Sarah Dalton	1,021	20.6	+0.1
Green	Geoffrey Allen	1,009	20.4	−1.3
Conservative	Neil Jopson	952	19.2	−2.5
Conservative	David Kenyon	897	18.1	+1.4
Liberal Democrats	Marguerite Pierre	576	11.6	+4.1
Liberal Democrats	Jonathan Douglas-Green	507	10.2	+3.7
Liberal Democrats	Philip Storry	447	9.0	+2.6
Turnout		14,188	40	
Registered electors		12,471		
Labour hold		Swing		
Labour hold		Swing		
Labour hold		Swing		

=== Petts Wood and Knoll ===
Petts Wood and Knoll
Party	Candidate	Votes	%	±%
Conservative	Keith Onslow	3,426	69.3	+5.6
Conservative	Tony Owen	3,299	66.7	+4.6
Conservative	Simon Fawthrop	3,104	62.8	+6.5
Liberal Democrats	Lesley Astier	863	17.4	+7.5
Labour	Benjamin Devlin	744	15.0	+0.9
Labour	Jemma Gallagher	694	14.0	+3.2
Green	Martin Childs	626	12.7	−0.6
Labour	Stephen Cranenburgh	565	11.4	+1.2
Liberal Democrats	John Loosemore	544	11.0	+1.9
Liberal Democrats	Michael Berridge	471	9.5	New
Turnout		14,336	47	
Registered electors		10,646		
Conservative hold		Swing		
Conservative hold		Swing		
Conservative hold		Swing		

=== Plaistow and Sundridge ===
Plaistow and Sundridge
Party	Candidate	Votes	%	±%
Conservative	Gareth Allatt	1,991	42.8	+0.2
Conservative	Peter Morgan	1,957	42.1	+0.8
Conservative	Michael Turner	1,935	41.6	+3.8
Labour	Angie Stack	1,696	36.4	+9.3
Labour	Pam Remon	1,578	33.9	+8.4
Labour	Simon Thomson	1,392	29.9	+6.2
Liberal Democrats	Lesley Furniss	616	13.2	+2.9
Liberal Democrats	Dominic Alessio	558	12.0	New
Green	John Street	504	10.8	−7.6
Liberal Democrats	Peter Furniss	452	9.7	−1.5
Women's Equality	Caroline MacVay	440	9.5	New
UKIP	Patricia Gulliver	265	5.7	−18.3
Turnout		13,384	40	
Registered electors		11,637		
Conservative hold		Swing		
Conservative hold		Swing		
Conservative hold		Swing		

=== Shortlands ===
Shortlands
Party	Candidate	Votes	%	±%
Conservative	Mary Cooke	2,080	63.6	+11.5
Conservative	Aisha Cuthbert	1,935	59.2	+1.0
Labour	Richard Hart	570	17.4	+0.6
Liberal Democrats	Richard Corbett	511	15.6	+5.7
Labour	Dermot McKibbin	500	15.3	+0.9
Liberal Democrats	Ilona Navarro-Weitzel	417	12.8	New
Green	Ann Garrett	342	10.5	−1.3
Turnout		6,355	43	
Registered electors		7,698		
Conservative hold		Swing		
Conservative hold		Swing		

=== West Wickham ===
West Wickham
Party	Candidate	Votes	%	±%
Conservative	Mark Brock	3,072	60.4	+7.2
Conservative	Nicholas Bennett	2,834	55.7	+2.5
Conservative	Hannah Gray	2,804	55.1	+5.7
Labour	Eli David	1,003	19.7	+1.8
Labour	Jeremy Adams	971	19.1	+1.4
Labour	Joanna Crispin	969	19.1	+2.9
Liberal Democrats	James Spencer-Boyce	846	16.6	+7.9
Green	Jenny Rust	562	11.0	−0.3
Liberal Democrats	Nigel Peaple	532	10.5	New
Liberal Democrats	Stephen Wells	489	9.6	New
UKIP	Victor Jackson	223	4.4	−18.8
UKIP	Colin Chuck	183	3.6	−16.2
UKIP	Brian Danes	148	2.9	New
Turnout		14,636	42	
Registered electors		11,977		
Conservative hold		Swing		
Conservative hold		Swing		
Conservative hold		Swing		

== 2018-2022 by-elections ==
Kelsey and Eden Park by-election, 29 November 2018
Party	Candidate	Votes	%	±%
Conservative	Christine Harris	1,626	45.2	▼1.3
Labour	Marie Bardsley	1,046	29.1	▲1.3
Liberal Democrats	Julie Ireland	633	17.6	▲1.0
UKIP	Graham Reakes	219	6.1	▲2.0
Green	Paul Enock	73	2.0	▼8.7
Majority		580	16.1	▼2.6
Turnout		3,597	29	
Conservative hold		Swing		

The by-election was called following the resignation of Dave Wibberley.

Crystal Palace by-election, 6 May 2021
Party	Candidate	Votes	%	±%
Labour	Ryan Thomson	2,235	53.1	▼3.8
Green	Maria Psaras	820	19.5	▲4.1
Conservative	Tom Capon	783	18.6	▲5.9
Liberal Democrats	Suraj Gandecha	370	8.8	▼6.3
Majority		1,415	31.6	▼7.9
Turnout		4,208	42	
Labour hold		Swing		
