= 2022 Bromley London Borough Council election =

2022 local election in Bromley

- 5 May 2022

All 58 seats to Bromley London Borough Council 30 seats needed for a majority
- Turnout: 37%
	First party	Second party	Third party
Leader	Colin Smith	Simon Jeal	Julie Ireland
Party	Conservative	Labour	Liberal Democrats
Last election	50 seats, 44.1%	8 seats, 24.3%	0 seats, 14.7%
Seats won	36	12	5
Seat change	▼14	▲4	▲5
Percentage	41.6%	32.0%	18.2%
Swing	▼2.5%	▲7.7%	▲3.5%
	Fourth party	Fifth party
Leader	Mark Smith
Party	Chislehurst Matters	Independent
Last election	New Party	2 seats, 3.0%
Seats won	3	2
Seat change	▲3	Steady
Percentage	3.3%	1.6%
Swing	▲3.3%	▼1.4%
- Map of the results of the 2022 Bromley London Borough Council election. Chislehurst Matters in green, Conservatives in blue, Labour in red, Liberal Democrats in yellow, Independents in grey.
council control before election
2018
Conservative
Subsequent council control
2022
Conservative

The 2022 Bromley London Borough Council election took place on 5 May 2022. All 58 members of Bromley London Borough Council were elected. The elections took place alongside local elections in the other London boroughs and elections to local authorities across the United Kingdom.

In the previous election in 2018, the Conservative Party maintained its longstanding control of the council, winning 50 out of the 60 seats with the Labour Party forming the primary opposition with eight of the remaining seats. Independent candidates won the other two. The 2022 election took place under new election boundaries, which reduced the number of councillors to 58.

In the election the incumbent Conservatives retained control of the council but lost seats to Labour, Liberal Democrats and Chislehurst Matters.

== Background ==
=== History ===
Result of the 2018 borough election

The thirty-two London boroughs were established in 1965 by the London Government Act 1963. They are the principal authorities in Greater London and have responsibilities including education, housing, planning, highways, social services, libraries, recreation, waste, environmental health and revenue collection. Some of the powers are shared with the Greater London Authority, which also manages passenger transport, police and fire.

Since its formation, Bromley has been controlled by the Conservative Party except for a period of no overall control between 1998 and 2001 which saw the council controlled by coalition between the Liberal Democrats and Labour. Local elections in the borough have seen Conservative, Labour, Liberal Democrat, UK Independence Party and independent councillors elected. In the previous election in 2018, the Conservatives maintained their longstanding majority on the council with 50 of the 60 seats up for election and 44.1% of the vote. Labour won eight with 24.3% of the vote and independent candidates won two seats with 3.0% of the vote. The Liberal Democrats received 14.3% of the vote and the Green Party received 10.3% of the vote, but neither party won any seats. The incumbent leader is the Conservative Colin Smith, who has held that position since 2017.

=== Council term ===
One of the Conservative councillors for the Kelsey and Eden Park ward resigned in October 2018 because he had to move due to work relocation. The November by-election was held for the party by the Conservative candidate Christine Harris. One of the Labour councillors for Crystal Palace ward, Marina Ahmad, resigned in 2021 to seek election as a member of the London Assembly for the Lambeth and Southwark constituency. A by-election was held on 5 May, the same date as the 2021 London mayoral election and London Assembly election. The seat was held for the Labour Party by Ryan Thomson.

Along with most other London boroughs, Bromley was subject to a boundary review ahead of the 2022 election. The Local Government Boundary Commission for England concluded that the council should have 58 seats, a reduction of two, and produced new election boundaries following a period of consultation. The new boundaries consist of one single-member ward, six two-member wards and fifteen three-member wards.

== Electoral process ==
Bromley, like the other London borough councils, elects all of its councillors at once every four years. The previous election took place in 2018. The election took place by multi-member first-past-the-post voting, with each ward being represented by one, two or three councillors. Electors had as many votes as there are councillors to be elected in their ward, with the top two or three being elected.

All registered electors (British, Irish, Commonwealth and European Union citizens) living in London aged 18 or over were entitled to vote in the election. People who lived at two addresses in different councils, such as university students with different term-time and holiday addresses, were entitled to be registered for and vote in elections in both local authorities. Voting in-person at polling stations took place from 7:00 to 22:00 on election day, and voters were able to apply for postal votes or proxy votes in advance of the election.

== Previous council composition ==
Council composition before the 2022 election

Council composition after the 2022 election

Before 2022 election		After 2022 election	
Party	Seats	Party	Seats
Conservative	50	Conservative	36
Labour	8	Labour	12
Liberal Democrats	0	Liberal Democrats	5
Independent	2	Independent	5

== Results summary ==
2022 Bromley London Borough Council election
Party	Seats	Gains	Losses	Net gain/loss	Seats %	Votes %	Votes	+/−
Conservative	36	0	3	▼14	62.1	41.6	100,689	-2.5
Labour	12	0	0	▲4	20.7	32.0	77,373	+7.7
Liberal Democrats	5	0	0	▲5	8.6	18.2	43,942	+3.5
Chislehurst Matters	3	3	0	▲3	5.2	3.3	7,906	New
Independent	2	0	0	Steady	3.4	1.6	3,761	-1.4
Green	0	0	0	Steady	0.0	3.3	7,971	-7.3
Reform	0	0	0	Steady	0.0	0.2	394	New

== Ward Results ==
Statements of persons nominated were published on 6 April 2022. Incumbent councillors are marked with an asterisk (*).

=== Beckenham Town and Copers Cope ===
Beckenham Town and Copers Cope (3 seats)
Party	Candidate	Votes	%	±%
Liberal Democrats	Chloe-Jane Ross	1,900	36.9	+7.0
Conservative	Michael Tickner*	1,763	34.3	−6.4
Liberal Democrats	Will Connolly	1,762	34.2	+2.5
Conservative	Stephen Wells*	1,733	33.7	−6.2
Conservative	Carline Deal	1,676	32.6	−5.2
Liberal Democrats	Dave Marshall	1,651	32.1	+5.2
Labour	Helen Brookfield	1,492	29.0	+5.3
Labour	Qahir Bandali	1,292	25.1	+3.1
Labour	Dermot McKibbin	1,243	24.2	+3.3
Green	Ruth Fabricant	545	10.6	−0.8
Turnout		5,146	43	
Registered electors		11,995		
Liberal Democrats win (new seat)				
Conservative win (new seat)				
Liberal Democrats win (new seat)				

=== Bickley & Sundridge ===
Bickley & Sundridge (3 seats)
Party	Candidate	Votes	%	±%
Conservative	Kate Lymer*	2,671	51.6	−6.4
Conservative	Colin Smith*	2,643	51.1	−5.1
Conservative	Kira Gabbert*	2,626	50.7	−7.6
Labour	Kelly Galvin	1,233	23.8	+3.5
Labour	Laura Vogel	1,182	22.8	+6.8
Labour	Tom Davies	1,163	22.5	+7.7
Liberal Democrats	Robert Cliff	996	19.2	+1.4
Liberal Democrats	Martin Cooper	919	17.8	+2.8
Liberal Democrats	Clive Broadhurst	796	15.4	+1.5
Green	Roisin Robertson	779	15.1	+2.6
Turnout		5,176	39	
Registered electors		13,421		
Conservative win (new seat)				
Conservative win (new seat)				
Conservative win (new seat)				

=== Biggin Hill ===
Biggin Hill (2 seats)
Party	Candidate	Votes	%	±%
Independent	Melanie Stevens*	1,443	45.6	+8.8
Independent	Sophie Dunbar	1,323	41.8	+4.1
Conservative	Victoria Nightingale	1,136	35.9	+6.1
Conservative	Andrew King	1,069	33.8	+6.6
Liberal Democrats	Geoff Gosst	361	11.4	+0.6
Labour	Stephen Cranenburgh	311	9.8	+2.0
Liberal Democrats	Malcolm Westbrook	255	8.1	+2.6
Labour	Margaret Mills	232	7.3	+0.1
Turnout		3,165	37	−3
Registered electors		8,455		
Independent hold		Swing		
Independent gain from Independent		Swing		

=== Bromley Common and Holwood ===
Cllr Jonathan Laidlaw sat as an independent until his death in June 2025.

Bromley Common and Holwood (3 seats)
Party	Candidate	Votes	%	±%
Conservative	David Jefferys*	2,114	47.1	−12.2
Conservative	Jonathan Laidlaw	2,019	45.0	−14.4
Conservative	Sunil Gupta	1,927	42.9	−14.8
Labour	Kay Abbs	1,470	32.8	+9.9
Labour	Kathryn Watts	1,245	27.7	+5.9
Labour	Amy de Vries	1,202	26.8	+5.9
Liberal Democrats	Alan Carter	813	18.1	+6.4
Liberal Democrats	Carol Denyer	794	17.7	+6.5
Green	Hannah Witham	739	16.5	+4.1
Liberal Democrats	Andrew Viner	559	12.5	+3.3
Turnout		4,488	32	
Registered electors		13,949		
Conservative win (new seat)				
Conservative win (new seat)				
Conservative win (new seat)				

=== Bromley Town ===
Bromley Town (3 seats)
Party	Candidate	Votes	%	±%
Liberal Democrats	Julie Ireland	1,929	44.8	+11.7
Liberal Democrats	Sam Webber	1,834	42.6	+9.5
Liberal Democrats	Graeme Casey	1,828	42.5	+8.2
Conservative	Nicky Dykes*	1,475	34.3	−5.5
Conservative	Michael Rutherford*	1,430	33.2	−1.9
Conservative	Will Harmer*	1,417	32.9	−4.6
Labour	Will Conway	735	17.1	−6.9
Labour	Larry Awobayiku	720	16.7	−6.7
Labour	Jez Frampton	652	15.1	−5.3
Green	Ann Garrett	512	11.9	+0.0
Turnout		4,304	38	
Registered electors		11,353		
Liberal Democrats win (new seat)				
Liberal Democrats win (new seat)				
Liberal Democrats win (new seat)				

=== Chelsfield ===
Chelsfield (2 seats)
Party	Candidate	Votes	%	±%
Conservative	Mike Botting*	1,838	51.8	−10.7
Conservative	Angela Page*	1,765	49.7	−9.4
Liberal Democrats	Gerda Loosemore-Reppen	993	28.0	+13.6
Liberal Democrats	Laura Thurimella	772	21.7	+8.5
Labour	Lynn Sellwood	541	15.2	−2.1
Labour	Kola Abiola	524	14.8	−0.7
Green	Daniel Sloan	467	13.2	+0.1
Turnout		3,551	41	
Registered electors		8,720		
Conservative win (new seat)				
Conservative win (new seat)				

=== Chislehurst ===
Chislehurst (3 seats)
Party	Candidate	Votes	%	±%
Chislehurst Matters	Alison Stammers	2,827	58.9	New
Chislehurst Matters	Mark Smith	2,548	53.1	New
Chislehurst Matters	Michael Jack	2,531	52.7	New
Conservative	Katy Boughey*	1,509	31.4	−35.3
Conservative	Edward Fitzgerald	1,453	30.3	−29.7
Conservative	Kieran Terry*	1,386	28.9	−33.6
Labour	Juliet Owens	478	10.0	−6.1
Labour	Ewan Greenwood	454	9.5	−4.7
Labour	Christian Mole	438	9.1	−10.3
Liberal Democrats	Mark Gill	252	5.2	−7.9
Liberal Democrats	Alex Wetton	249	5.2	−5.7
Turnout		4,801	41	
Registered electors		11,576		
Chislehurst Matters gain from Conservative		Swing		
Chislehurst Matters gain from Conservative		Swing		
Chislehurst Matters gain from Conservative		Swing		

=== Clock House ===
Clock House (3 seats)
Party	Candidate	Votes	%	±%
Labour	Jessica Arnold	3,464	66.1	+17.7
Labour	Josh King*	3,305	63.1	+21.7
Labour	Jeremy Adams	3,299	63.0	+19.2
Conservative	Gemma Turrell	1,020	19.5	−7.5
Conservative	Jack Miller	997	19.0	−6.8
Conservative	Will Joce	991	18.9	−5.5
Liberal Democrats	Claudio Gambarotta	810	15.5	−6.9
Liberal Democrats	Nicholas Weaks	714	13.6	−8.4
Liberal Democrats	Jonathan Webber	679	13.0	−8.1
Turnout		5,237	41	
Registered electors		12,647		
Labour hold		Swing		
Labour hold		Swing		
Labour hold		Swing		

=== Crystal Palace and Anerley ===
Crystal Palace and Anerley (New) (2 seats)
Party	Candidate	Votes	%	±%
Labour	Ruth McGregor	1,760	68.7	+5.7
Labour	Ryan Thomson*	1,549	60.4	+7.3
Green	Maria Psaras	548	21.4	+4.4
Conservative	Penny Jones	317	12.4	−1.6
Conservative	Joseph Ward	276	10.8	−2.6
Liberal Democrats	Philippa Bridge	265	10.3	−6.4
Liberal Democrats	Stuart Benefield	181	7.1	−2.7
Turnout		2,563	31	
Registered electors		8,373		
Labour win (new seat)				
Labour win (new seat)				

=== Darwin ===
Darwin (1 seat)
Party	Candidate	Votes	%	±%
Conservative	Jonathan Andrews	920	56.4	−16.4
Independent	Julian Grainger	326	20.0	New
Labour	Jeff Slee	162	9.9	−1.3
Liberal Democrats	John Loosemore	128	7.9	−0.2
Green	Jan Wilson	89	5.5	−2.4
Turnout		1,630	36	
Registered electors		4,241		
Conservative hold		Swing		

=== Farnborough and Crofton ===
Farnborough and Crofton (3 seats)
Party	Candidate	Votes	%	±%
Conservative	Bob Evans*	2,941	54.2	−10.1
Conservative	Charles Joel*	2,910	53.6	−9.3
Conservative	Christopher Marlow*	2,773	51.1	−7.5
Liberal Democrats	Katherine Anderson	1,239	22.8	
Labour	Cameron Bewley	1,154	21.3	
Labour	Christine McNamara	1,071	19.7	+5.1
Liberal Democrats	Allan Tweddle	1,038	19.1	+3.9
Labour	Tim Fisher	977	18.0	
Liberal Democrats	John Mangold	910	16.8	
Green	Juergen Wiegerling	669	12.3	
Turnout		5,427	40	
Registered electors		13,524		
Conservative hold		Swing		
Conservative hold		Swing		
Conservative hold		Swing		

=== Hayes and Coney Hall ===
Hayes and Coney Hall (3 seats)
Party	Candidate	Votes	%	±%
Conservative	Alexa Michael*	2,527	52.0	−7.4
Conservative	Thomas Turrell	2,347	48.3	
Conservative	Andrew Lee	2,184	44.9	
Labour	Susan Moore	1,552	31.9	
Labour	Thomas Morton	1,171	24.1	
Labour	Michael Roberts	1,049	21.6	
Green	Sarah Chant	986	20.3	
Liberal Democrats	Tudor Griffiths	858	17.7	+6.8
Liberal Democrats	Liz Kemp	679	14.0	
Liberal Democrats	Andrew De Whalley	491	10.1	
Turnout		4,859	40	
Registered electors		12,106		
Conservative hold		Swing		
Conservative hold		Swing		
Conservative hold		Swing		

=== Kelsey and Eden Park ===
Kelsey and Eden Park (3 seats)
Party	Candidate	Votes	%	±%
Conservative	Christine Harris*	2,073	44.9	
Conservative	Peter Dean*	2,064	44.7	−4.7
Conservative	Diane Smith*	2,000	43.3	−5.0
Labour	Marie Bardsley	1,877	40.6	+10.2
Labour	John Dempster	1,691	36.6	+10.4
Labour	Stephen Scott	1,627	35.2	
Liberal Democrats	Gillian Hollamby	762	16.5	
Liberal Democrats	Stafford Fitch-Bunce	611	13.2	
Liberal Democrats	John Gorski	581	12.6	
Reform	Graham Reakes	105	2.3	
Turnout		4,622	39	
Registered electors		11,713		
Conservative hold		Swing		
Conservative hold		Swing		
Conservative hold		Swing		

=== Mottingham ===
Mottingham (New) (2 seats)
Party	Candidate	Votes	%	±%
Conservative	David Cartwright*	1,081	45.5	−0.2
Conservative	Will Rowlands*	936	39.4	−1.4
Labour	Simon Thompson	892	37.6	
Labour	Owen Wittekind	795	33.5	
Liberal Democrats	John Houghton	262	11.0	
Green	Saskia Sabelus	258	10.9	
Liberal Democrats	Colin England	200	8.4	
Independent	Doreen Thompson	113	4.8	
Turnout		8,063	29	
Registered electors		8,063		
Conservative win (new seat)				
Conservative win (new seat)				

=== Orpington ===
Orpington (2 seats)
Party	Candidate	Votes	%	±%
Conservative	Kim Botting*	1,630	47.4	−14.7
Conservative	Pauline Tunnicliffe*	1,608	46.7	−12.6
Liberal Democrats	Rick Das	1,026	29.8	+15.1
Liberal Democrats	David Morrison	991	28.8	+15.8
Labour	Hannah Barlow	774	22.5	+1.9
Labour	James Talbot	661	19.2	−1.4
Turnout		3,441	37	
Registered electors		9,210		
Conservative hold		Swing		
Conservative hold		Swing		

=== Penge and Cator ===
Penge and Cator (3 seats)
Party	Candidate	Votes	%	±%
Labour	Kathy Bance*	3,655	75.0	+9.1
Labour	Simon Jeal*	3,082	63.2	+8.8
Labour	Kevin Kennedy-Brooks*	2,742	56.3	−0.8
Green	Geoffrey Allen	1,300	26.7	+6.1
Conservative	Sam Griffiths	664	13.6	
Conservative	Josh Coldspring-White	658	13.5	
Liberal Democrats	Jonathan Burns	603	12.4	
Conservative	Sumeet Jalan	602	12.4	
Liberal Democrats	Lindsay Maxwell	370	7.6	
Liberal Democrats	Michael Jones	288	5.9	
Turnout		4,873	36	
Registered electors		13,622		
Labour hold		Swing		
Labour hold		Swing		
Labour hold		Swing		

=== Petts Wood and Knoll ===
Petts Wood and Knoll (3 seats)
Party	Candidate	Votes	%	±%
Conservative	Keith Onslow*	2,992	54.8	−14.5
Conservative	Tony Owen*	2,905	53.2	−13.7
Conservative	Simon Fawthrop*	2,880	52.8	−10.0
Liberal Democrats	Ian Catchpole	1,437	26.3	
Liberal Democrats	Oliver Loosemore	1,293	23.7	
Labour	John Pead	1,170	21.4	
Liberal Democrats	Andy Stotesbury	1,133	20.8	
Labour	Charlotte Grievson	1,124	20.6	
Labour	Gareth Wretham	915	16.8	
Turnout		5,457	43	
Registered electors		12,828		
Conservative hold		Swing		
Conservative hold		Swing		
Conservative hold		Swing		

=== Plaistow ===
Gary Stevens was a sitting councillor for Cray Valley West.

Plaistow (New) (2 seats)
Party	Candidate	Votes	%	±%
Labour	Alisa Igoe	1,566	44.5	
Labour	Tony McPartlan	1,514	43.0	
Conservative	Panos Papayannakos	1,390	39.5	
Conservative	Gary Stevens*	1,353	38.4	
Liberal Democrats	Alison Davis	344	9.8	
Green	Heather Wallace-Brown	316	9.0	
Liberal Democrats	Peter Furniss	297	8.4	−1.3
Independent	Alice Akullu	80	2.3	
Turnout		3,522	38	
Registered electors		9,383		
Labour win (new seat)				
Labour win (new seat)				

=== Shortlands and Park Langley ===
Shortlands and Park Langley (New) (3 seats)
Party	Candidate	Votes	%	±%
Conservative	Felicity Bainbridge	2,262	46.4	
Conservative	Aisha Cuthbert*	2,151	44.1	−15.1
Conservative	Adam Grant	2,110	43.3	
Labour	Joanna Crispin	1,542	31.6	
Labour	Peter Ayres	1,515	31.1	
Labour	Martin Spence	1,306	26.8	
Liberal Democrats	Andy Coleman	1,078	22.1	
Liberal Democrats	Stephen Wells	980	20.1	
Liberal Democrats	Suraj Gandecha	976	20.0	
Reform	Edward Apostolides	156	3.2	
Turnout		4,874	39	
Registered electors		12,497		
Conservative win (new seat)				
Conservative win (new seat)				
Conservative win (new seat)				

=== St Mary Cray ===
St Mary Cray (New) (3 seats)
Party	Candidate	Votes	%	±%
Conservative	Yvonne Bear*	1,930	46.3	+2.2
Conservative	Shaun Slator	1,900	45.6	
Conservative	Harry Stranger*	1,847	44.3	+4.4
Labour	Nathaniel Arthur	1,676	40.2	+2.6
Labour	Richard Honess	1,627	39.1	
Labour	Deborah Price	1,590	38.2	
Liberal Democrats	Victoria Webber	533	12.8	
Liberal Democrats	Ian Magrath	499	12.0	
Liberal Democrats	Peter Mansell	448	10.8	
Turnout		4,166	31	
Registered electors		13,501		
Conservative win (new seat)				
Conservative win (new seat)				
Conservative win (new seat)				

=== St Paul's Cray ===
St Paul's Cray (New) (3 seats)
Party	Candidate	Votes	%	±%
Labour	Chris Price	1,118	40.2	
Conservative	Colin Hitchins*	1,101	39.6	+0.5
Labour	Rebecca Wiffen	1,089	39.1	
Conservative	Tina Powley	1,069	38.4	
Labour	Tim Westwood	1,028	36.9	
Conservative	Rahul Gupta	953	34.2	
Independent	Andy Wilson	476	17.1	
Liberal Democrats	Richard Jones	300	10.8	
Liberal Democrats	Dominic Alessio	295	10.6	
Liberal Democrats	Steve Sollitt	270	9.7	
Turnout		2,783	24	
Registered electors		11,686		
Labour win (new seat)				
Conservative win (new seat)				
Labour win (new seat)				

=== West Wickham ===
West Wickham (3 seats)
Party	Candidate	Votes	%	±%
Conservative	Mark Brock*	2,341	51.6	−8.8
Conservative	Hannah Gray*	2,172	47.9	−7.2
Conservative	Nicholas Bennett*	2,164	47.7	−8.0
Labour	Angela Barnett	1,308	28.9	
Labour	Philip Shemmings	1,256	27.7	
Labour	Peter Barnett	1,114	24.6	
Green	Angela Hulm	763	16.8	
Liberal Democrats	Rachael Clarke	618	13.6	
Liberal Democrats	Christopher Bentley	557	12.3	
Liberal Democrats	Michelle Pike	535	11.8	
Reform	Victor Jackson	133	2.9	−1.5
Turnout		4,533	39	−3
Registered electors		11,556		
Conservative hold		Swing		
Conservative hold		Swing		
Conservative hold		Swing		

== Changes 2022-2026 ==
=== Affiliation changes ===
Affiliation	Councillors		
Affiliation	Elected in 2022	Current	Difference
Conservative	36	34	▼2
Labour	12	12	Steady
Liberal Democrats	5	5	Steady
Chislehurst Matters	3	3	Steady
Independent	2	2	Steady
Reform	0	2	▲2
Total	58	58	Steady

=== By-elections ===
Hayes and Coney Hall by-election, 7 December 2023
Party	Candidate	Votes	%	±%
Conservative	Josh Coldspring-White	1,541	48.0	▲3.1
Labour	Susan Moore	962	30.0	▼1.9
Liberal Democrats	Tudor Griffiths	526	16.4	▼1.3
Green	Sarah Chant	183	5.7	▼14.6
Turnout		3,212	27	
Registered electors		12,063		
Conservative hold		Swing		

The Hayes and Coney Hall by-election was triggered following the death of Cllr Andrew Lee.

Shortlands and Park Langley by-election, 2 May 2024
Party	Candidate	Votes	%	±%
Conservative	Gemma Turrell	2,835	42.4	▼1.7
Labour	Charlotte Grievson	2,005	30.0	▲0.2
Liberal Democrats	Gita Bapat	836	12.5	▼8.0
Reform	Edward Apostolides	417	6.2	▲3.0
Green	Louis Goddard-Glen	374	5.6	New
Independent	Brendan Donegan	219	3.3	New
Conservative hold				

The Shortlands and Park Langley by-election was triggered by the resignation of Conservative councillor Aisha Cuthbert.

Bromley Common & Holwood by-election: 24 July 2025
Party	Candidate	Votes	%	±%
Reform	Alan Cook	1,342	34.0	N/A
Conservative	Ian Payne	1,161	29.4	–11.8
Labour	Elizabeth Morgan	720	18.2	–10.4
Liberal Democrats	Laura McCracken	540	13.7	–2.1
Green	Ruth Fabricant	185	4.7	–9.7
Majority		181	4.6	N/A
Turnout		3,948	28.0	–4.0
Reform gain from Conservative				

The Bromley Common and Holwood by-election was triggered by the death of Independent, formerly Conservative, councillor Jonathan Laidlaw.
