= Beckenham and Penge =

UK Parliament constituency (since 2024)

- County constituency for the House of Commons
- Interactive map of boundaries since 2024
- Location within Greater London
- County: Greater London
- Electorate: 76,625 (March 2020)
- Borough: Bromley

Current constituency
- Created: 2024
- Member of Parliament: Liam Conlon (Labour)
- Seats: One
- Created from: Beckenham & Lewisham West and Penge

Beckenham and Penge is a constituency in Greater London represented in the House of Commons of the UK Parliament. Further to the completion of the 2023 review of Westminster constituencies, it was first contested at the 2024 general election, since when it has been represented by Liam Conlon of the Labour Party.

== Constituency profile ==
The Beckenham and Penge constituency is located in south east London on the outskirts of the city and covers the north-western part of the Borough of Bromley. It is suburban in character and contains the areas of Beckenham, Penge, West Wickham and parts of Crystal Palace.

The area was rural but experienced rapid population growth after the arrival of a railway in 1857. Residents of the constituency are generally wealthier and more likely to work in professional jobs than the London and national averages. Beckenham and Penge is more ethnically diverse than the country as a whole but less so than the rest of London; 73% of the population are White, 11% are Black and 7% are Asian. At the most recent borough council election in 2022, the seats in Penge and the west of Beckenham were won by Labour Party candidates whilst the seats in West Wickham and the east of the constituency were won by Conservatives. In the 2016 referendum on European Union membership, 58% of the constituency's voters are estimated to have supported remaining in the EU.

== Boundaries ==
Under the 2023 boundary review, the constituency was defined as comprising the following wards of the London Borough of Bromley as they existed on 1 December 2020:

- Copers Cope, Kelsey and Eden Park, Shortlands, and West Wickham, transferred from Beckenham (now abolished).
- Clock House, Crystal Palace and Anerley, and Penge and Cator, transferred from Lewisham West and Penge (now abolished).

Following a local government boundary review of Bromley, which became effective in May 2022, it now comprises the following wards from the 2024 general election:

- Beckenham Town and Copers Cope; Clock House; Crystal Palace and Anerley; Kelsey and Eden Park; Penge and Cator; Shortlands and Park Langley (except polling district SHP5X); and West Wickham.

== Election results ==
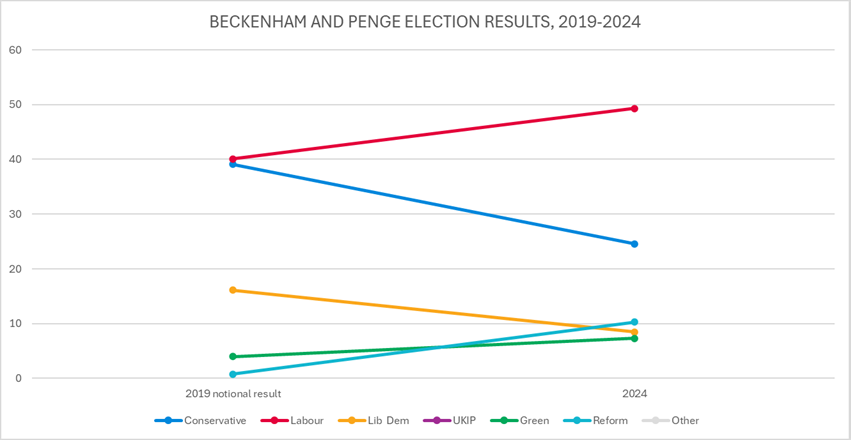
Election results 2019–2024

=== Elections in the 2020s ===
General election 2024: Beckenham and Penge
Party	Candidate	Votes	%	±%
Labour	Liam Conlon	25,753	49.3	▲9.2
Conservative	Hannah Gray	12,848	24.6	▼14.5
Reform	Edward Apostolides	5,355	10.3	▲9.5
Liberal Democrats	Chloe-Jane Ross	4,436	8.5	▼7.6
Green	Ruth Fabricant	3,830	7.3	▲3.3
Majority		12,905	24.7	▲23.7
Turnout		52,207	67.7	▼10.8
Registered electors		77,194		
Labour hold		Swing	▲11.9	

=== 2019 notional result ===
2019 notional result (Note: Estimate of the 2019 general election result as if the revised boundaries recommended under the 2023 boundary review were in place)
Party	Vote	%
Labour	24,118	40.1
Conservative	23,487	39.1
Liberal Democrats	9,657	16.1
Green	2,416	4.0
Brexit Party	464	0.8
Majority	631	1.0
Turnout	60,142	78.5
Electorate	76,625	
