= River Pool (London) =

River in London, England

Coordinates: 51°26′20″N 0°01′36″W

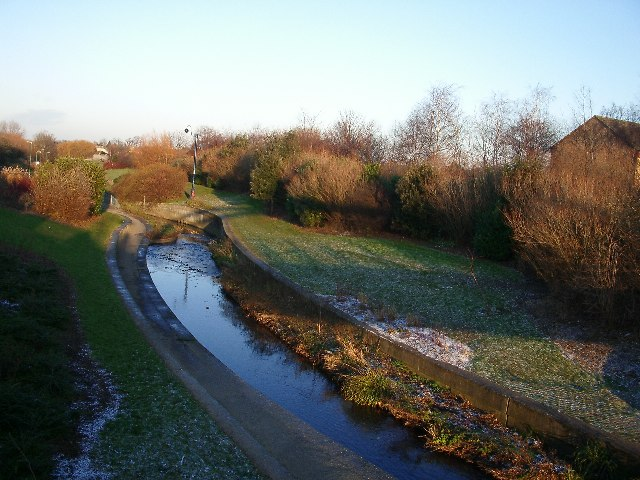
The river in Bell Green

The River Pool, or Pool River, is an urban river in south London, England. It is a tributary of the River Ravensbourne.

== Geography ==
Course of the River Pool

The River Pool is 5.1 kilometres (3.2 mi) in length, and rises with its tributaries between Shirley and West Wickham in the London Borough of Croydon. It then flows northwards through Beckenham in the London Borough of Bromley, and Sydenham in the London Borough of Lewisham, to join the Ravensbourne in Catford. Two of its tributaries are the River Beck and the Chaffinch Brook.

For much of its length the river lies in a floodplain. Land on either side is given up to sports grounds and a flood watch is kept continually on it.

In New Beckenham, the River Pool Walkway, running north from Lennard Road near the Midland Bank Sports Ground and Cator Park, includes a conservation site and naturalised areas; the route is part of the National Cycle Network. At Sydenham, the section of the river that ran in a culvert under the gas works has been opened up and landscaped.

In June 2009, London Mayor Boris Johnson fell into the River Pool whilst promoting volunteering to clean up the waterway.
