= Municipal Borough of Beckenham =

Former local government area in the UK

Coordinates: 51.41°N 0.02°W

Beckenham
- Area
  - 1881: 3,881 acres (15.71 km^{2})
  - 1901: 3,881 acres (15.71 km^{2})
  - 1931: 3,889 acres (15.74 km^{2})
  - 1961: 5,935 acres (24.02 km^{2})
- Population
  - 1881: 13,045
  - 1901: 26,331
  - 1931: 43,832
  - 1961: 77,290
- History
  - Created: 1878
  - Abolished: 1965
  - Succeeded by: London Borough of Bromley
- Status: Local board (1878 - 1894); Urban district (1894 - 1935); Municipal borough (after 1935)
- Government
  - HQ: Beckenham Town Hall (demolished)
  - Motto: Non Nobis Solum (Not for ourselves alone)

Beckenham was a local government district in north west Kent from 1878 to 1965 around the town of Beckenham. The area was suburban to London, formed part of the Metropolitan Police District and from 1933 was included in the area of the London Passenger Transport Board.

== History ==
In 1878 the parish of Beckenham adopted the Local Government Act 1858 and formed a local board of 15 members to govern the area. The Local Government Act 1894 reconstituted the local board's area as an urban district. The urban district was divided into seven wards of Coper's Cope, Eden Park, Kent House, Langley Park, Lawrie Park, Manor House and Shortlands. It encompassed parts of Penge and Sydenham postal districts to the north east of Crystal Palace Park, including a strip of the east side of the park itself. Each ward returned three councillors to Beckenham Urban District Council.

A distinctive town hall with a tall clock tower, which was designed by Lanchester, Lucas and Lodge in the Neo-Georgian style, was built in the High Street and completed in 1932. It was demolished in the 1990s.

The urban district was extended by a county review order in 1934, taking in parts of Hayes and West Wickham from the abolished Bromley Rural District. In 1935 the urban district council successfully petitioned for a charter of incorporation, and became a municipal borough.

In 1965 the municipal borough was abolished by the London Government Act 1963 and its former area transferred to Greater London from Kent. Its former area was combined with that of other districts to form the present-day London Borough of Bromley. The town hall became surplus to requirements and was demolished in the 1990s.

== Coat of arms ==
The borough was granted a coat of arms on incorporation. The shield was green, recalling that for most its history Beckenham had been a rural community. Across the centre were two silver waves, for the River Beck. At the top of the shield were two flowering chestnut trees. These represented the trees and flowers of the town's open spaces and parks. At the base of the shield was the white horse of Kent. The crest above the shield was a gold lion from the heraldry of the Cator family. John Cator was lord of the manor from 1773 and developed Beckenham from a village into a town. The lion supported a mitre and pastoral staff. These stood for Odo, Bishop of Bayeux, who received the manor of Beckenham at the time of the Norman Conquest. The supporters were described as gentleman and lady "in the costume of the early sixteenth century".
