= Kelsey Park =

Public park in London, England

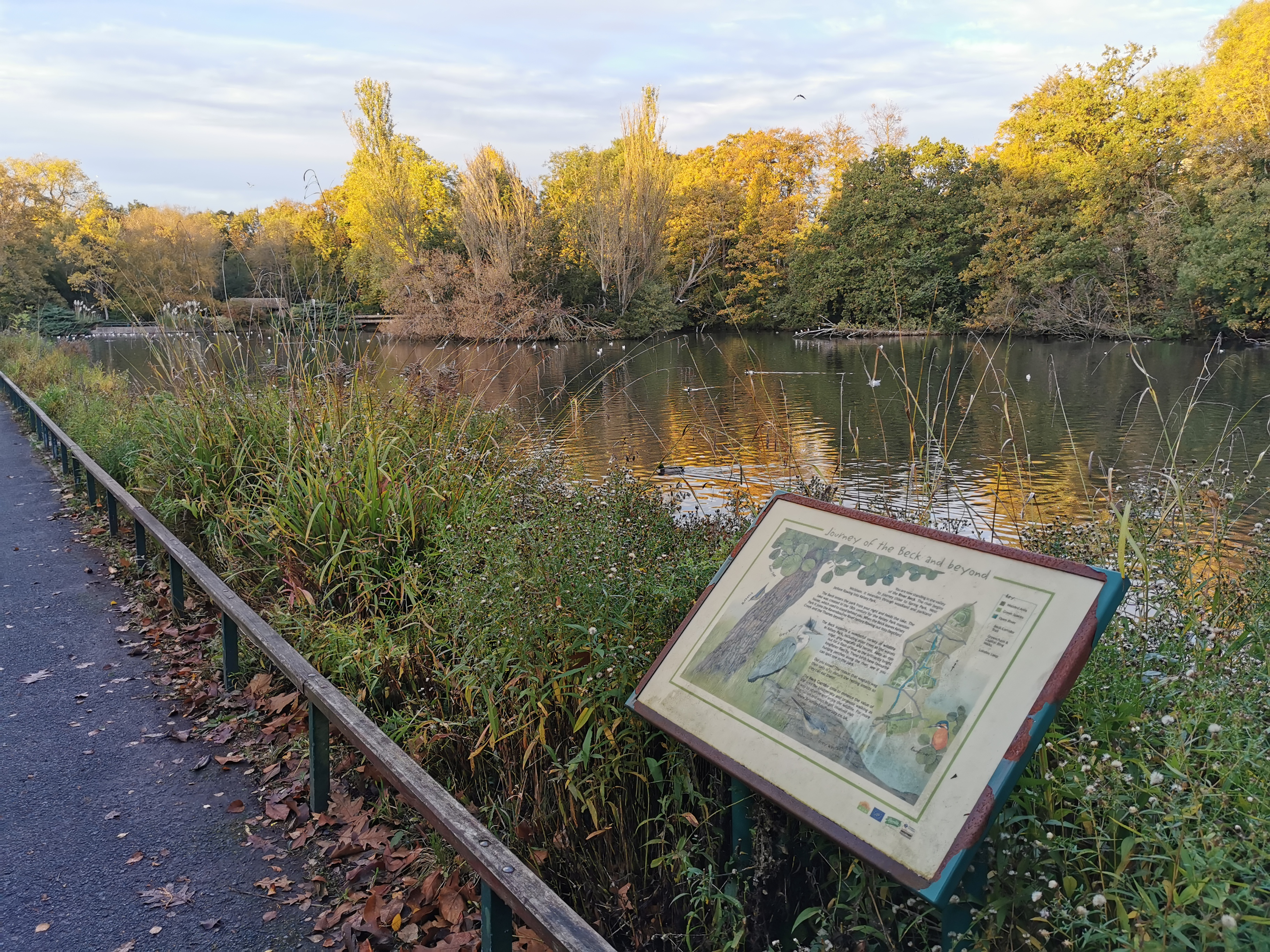
- Main lake with Heron Island in distance, October 2021

- Location within Greater London Location within England
- Interactive map of Kelsey Park
- Type: Urban park
- Location: London, England
- OS grid: TQ 376 689
- Coordinates: 51.402°N 0.023°W
- Area: 32.25 hectares (79.69 acres)
- Established: 1913
- Etymology: Kelsey family who owned estate in 15th century
- Manager: Bromley London Borough Council (in partnership with Friends of Kelsey Park)
- Status: Open year-round
- Public transit: Rail: Beckenham Junction; Bus: 162, 352, 358 (to south); 54, 227, 354, 367 (to north)
- Facilities: Café, toilets, children's play area, tennis courts, mini golf course, tree walk, children's nature walk
- Website: Friends of Kelsey Park

Kelsey Park is a public park in Beckenham in the borough of Bromley, Greater London. It historically formed the landscaped park of the Kelsey Manor Estate. The river Beck runs through it.

== History ==
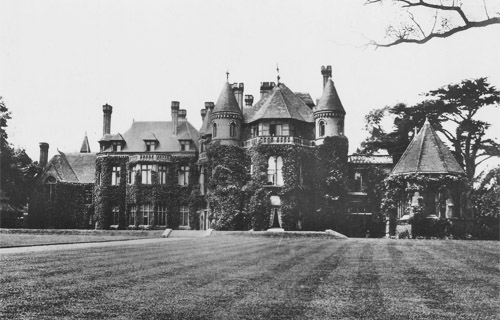
Kelsey Manor (demolished in 1921)

The original mansion was built around 1408 for William Kelshulle and demolished around 1800. A second mansion was built for Richard Bennett around that time and then acquired by Peter Richard Hoare, the elder (a partner in the banking firm C. Hoare & Co) in 1835. Peter Richard Hoare, the elder converted the manor into a rambling Gothic Revival house. The house passed to Peter Richard Hoare, the younger in 1849: he added a chapel, designed by Sir George Gilbert Scott, in 1869. It then passed to Charles Arthur Richard Hoare in 1877.

The land adjoining Wickham Road was sold in the 1890s and laid out with large Arts and Crafts movement houses designed by Francis Hooper. The house became a convent for the All Saints Sisters of the Poor in 1895 and then became Kepplestone School for the Daughters of Gentlemen in 1901. Following the death of Charles Arthur Richard Hoare in 1908, Beckenham Urban District Council acquired the estate in 1911.

Kelsey Park was officially opened to the public by Right Honourable John Burns MP, President of the Local Government Board, on 31 May 1913. The house itself was used by the British Army during the First World War and was demolished in 1921.

Kelsey Park School which was opened in 1968 takes its name from the fact it was built on the historic Kelsey Park Estate; however following Academy conversion in September 2011 it was renamed to Harris Academy Beckenham.

Kelsey Park is managed by Bromley London Borough Council in partnership with Friends of Kelsey Park, a non-profit organisation formed in 1997 that consists of around 600 members and publishes the triannual Kelsey Park Magazine.

== Governance ==
Kelsey Park is part of the Kelsey and Eden Park ward for elections to Bromley London Borough Council.

== Gallery ==
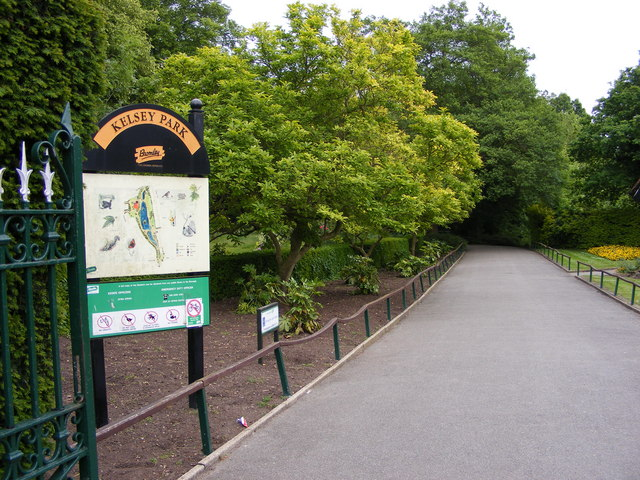
Information board by northern entrance off Manor Way

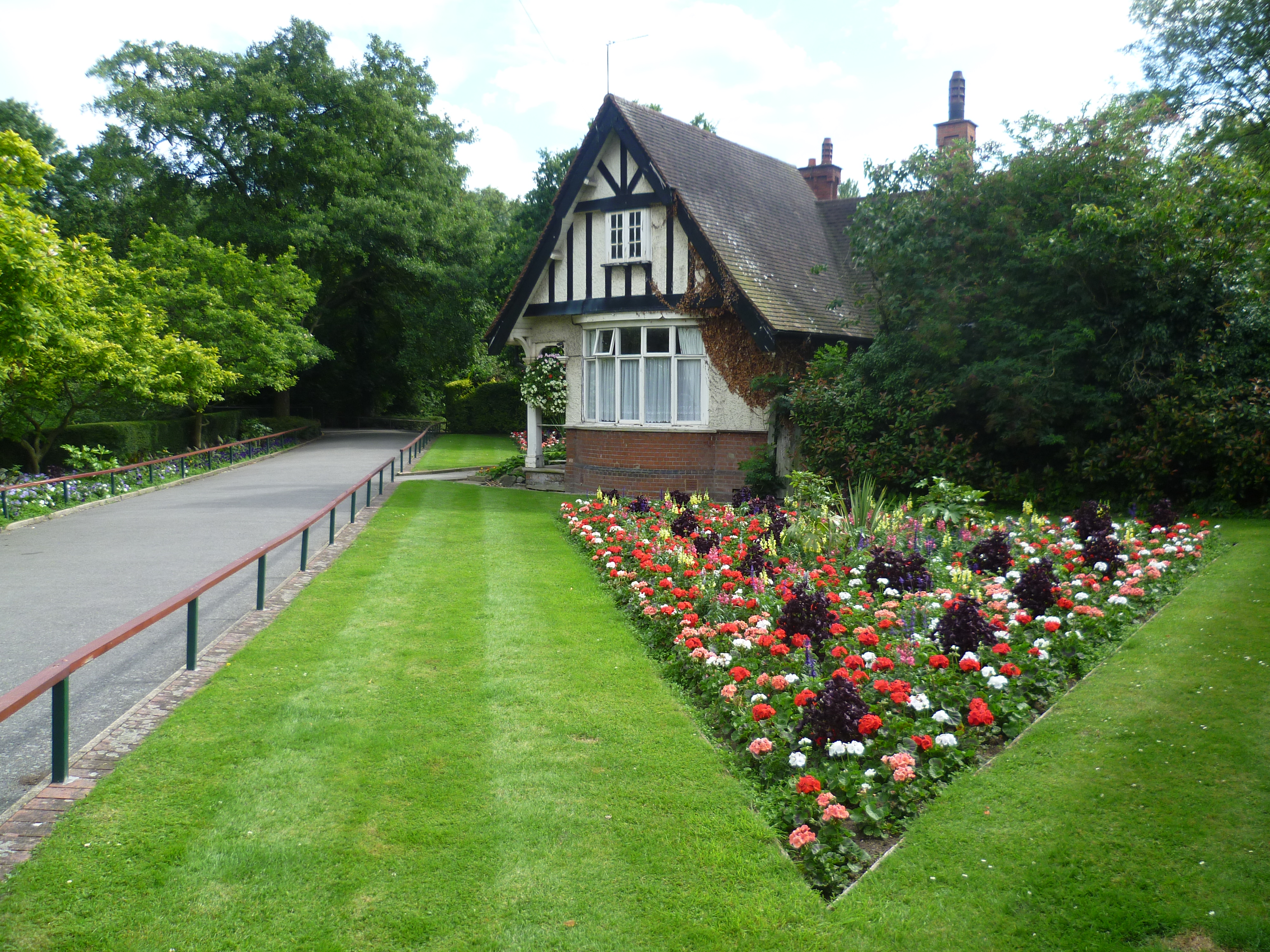
Gate lodge near northern entrance

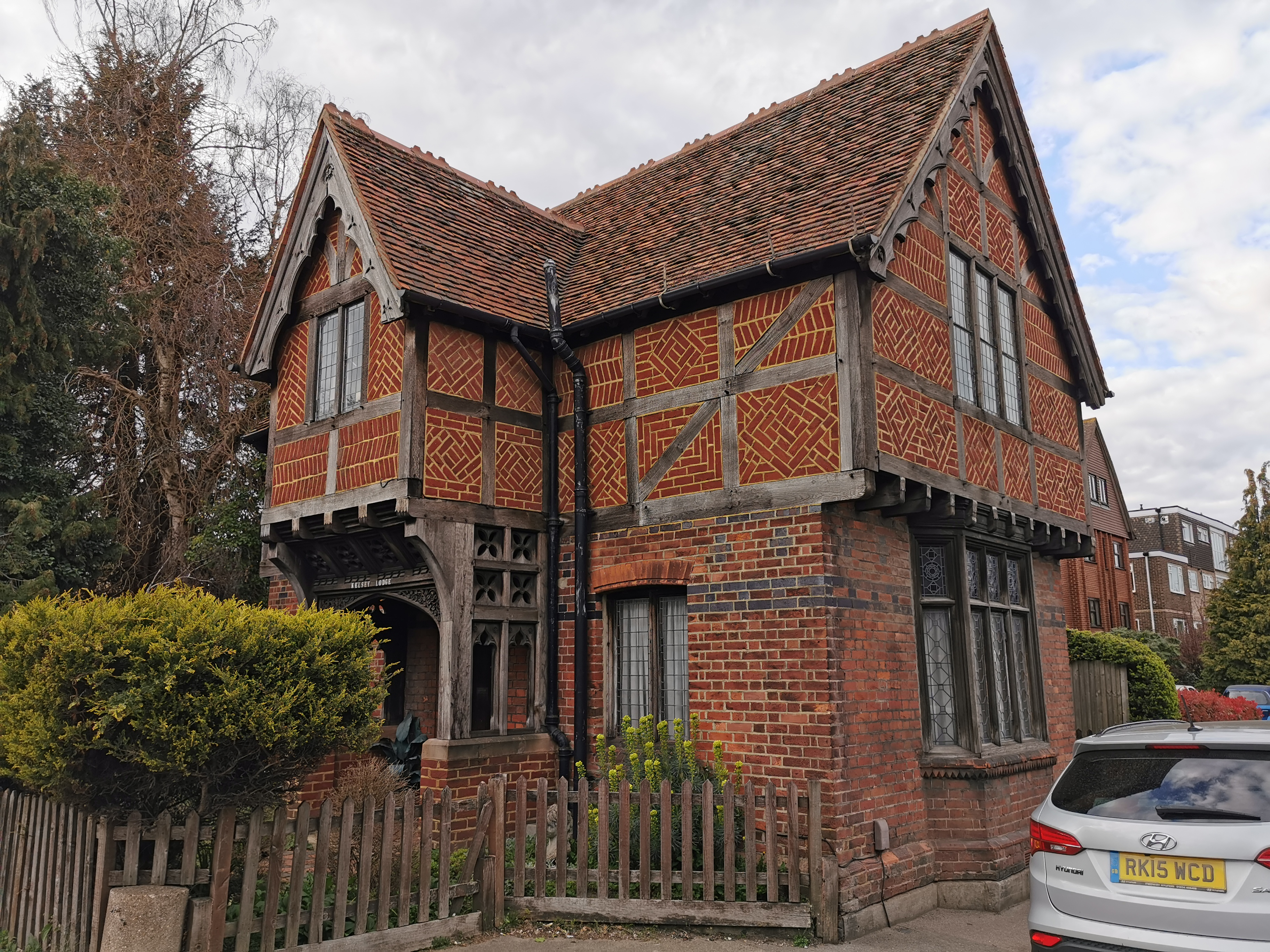
Kelsey Lodge, a Grade II–listed late Victorian Tudor Revival lodge by the eastern entrance off Wickham Rd.

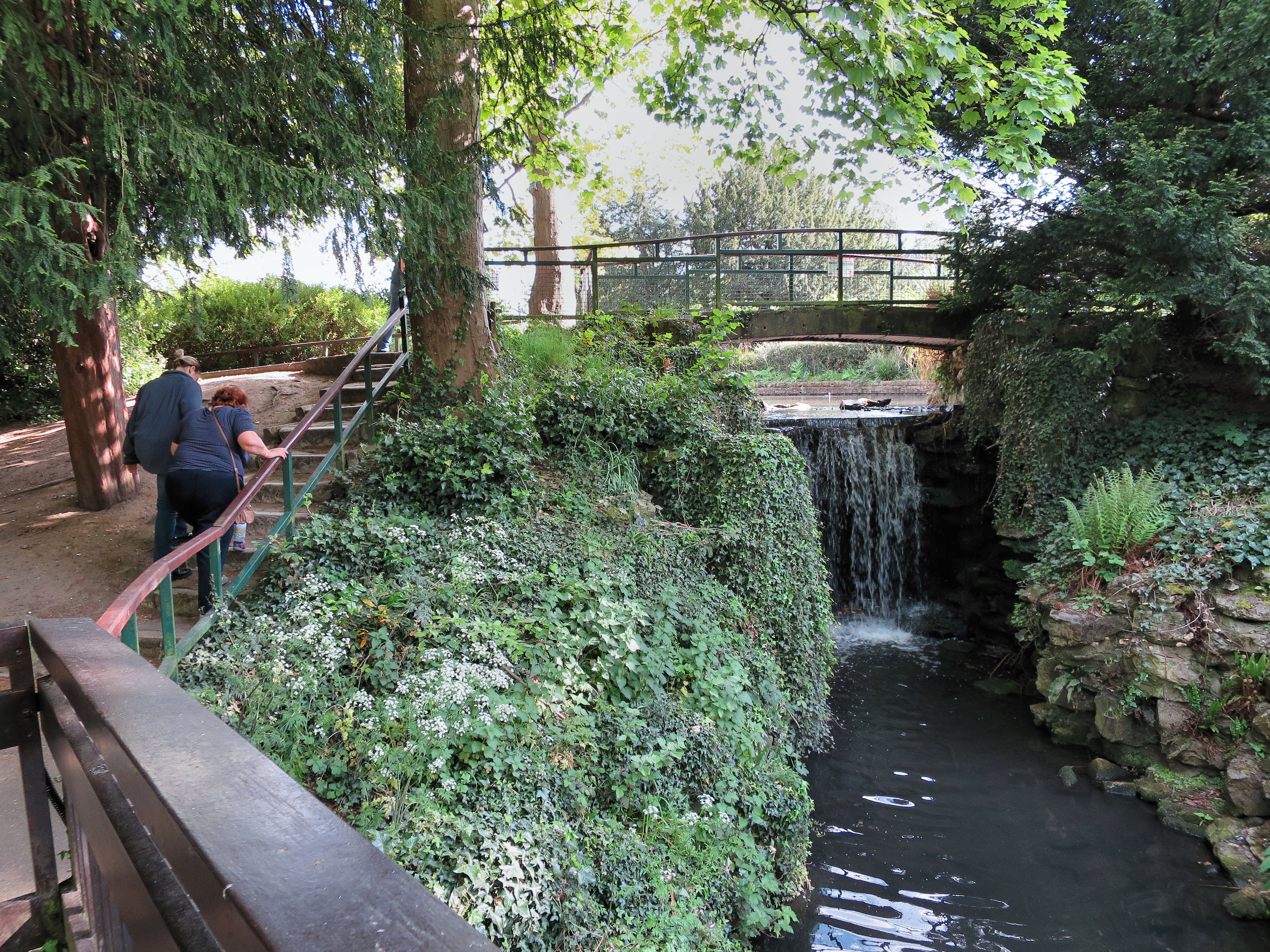
River Beck waterfall just north of main lake

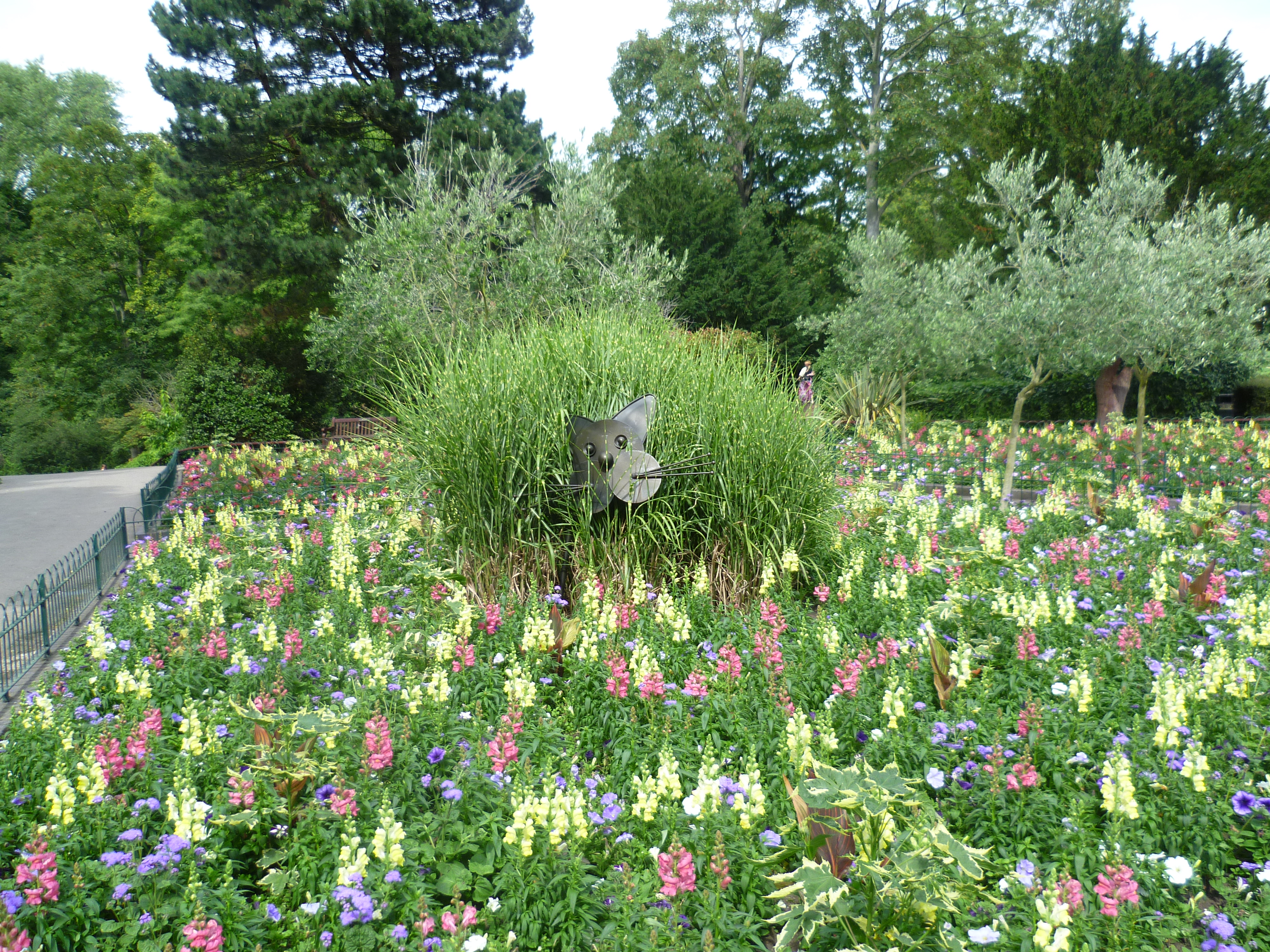
Ornamental cat in a flowerbed
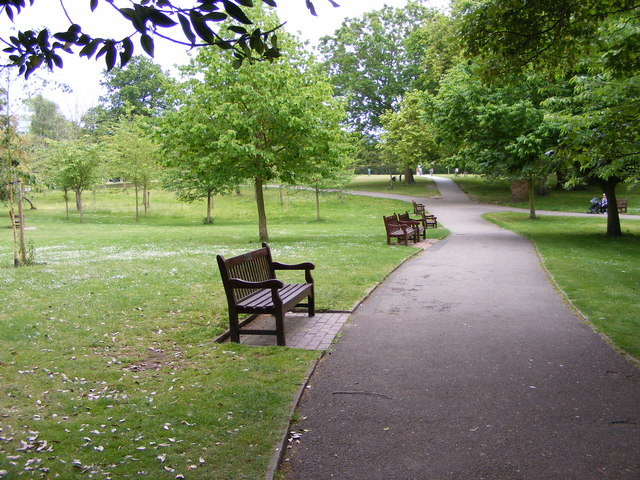
Paths and benches near main open area

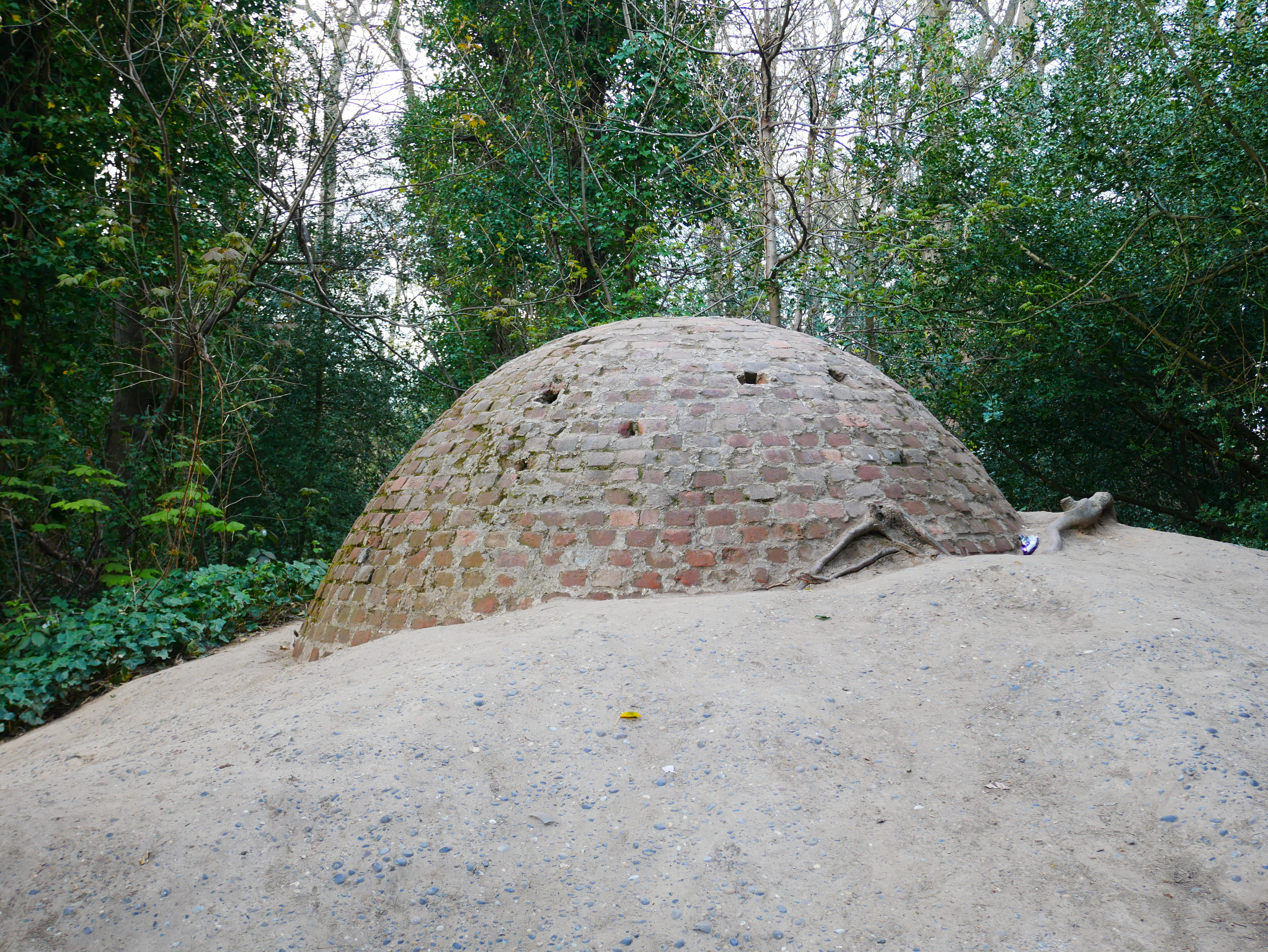
Ice house near southern end of park, probably dating from the early 19th century

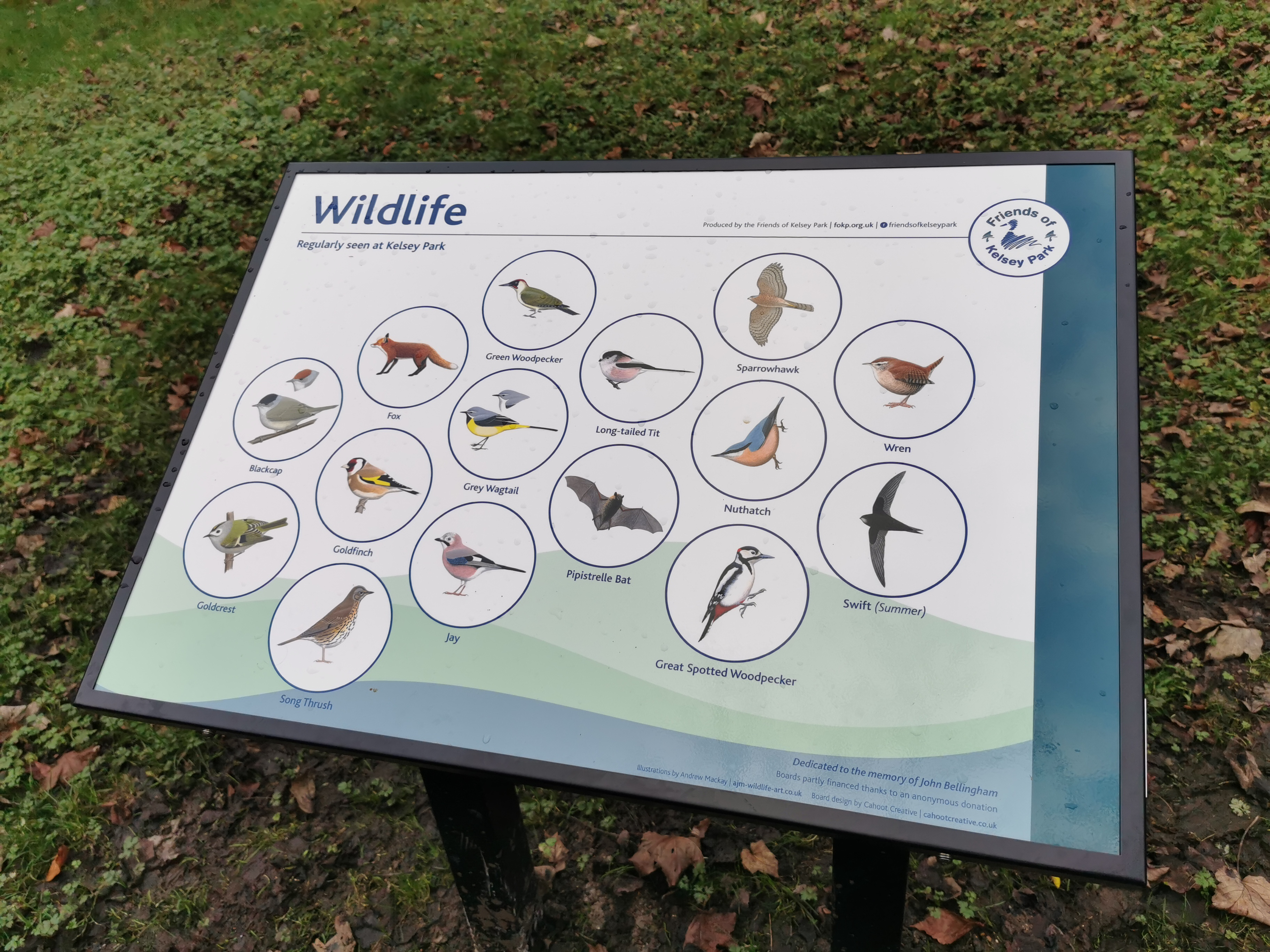
Wildlife of Kelsey Park

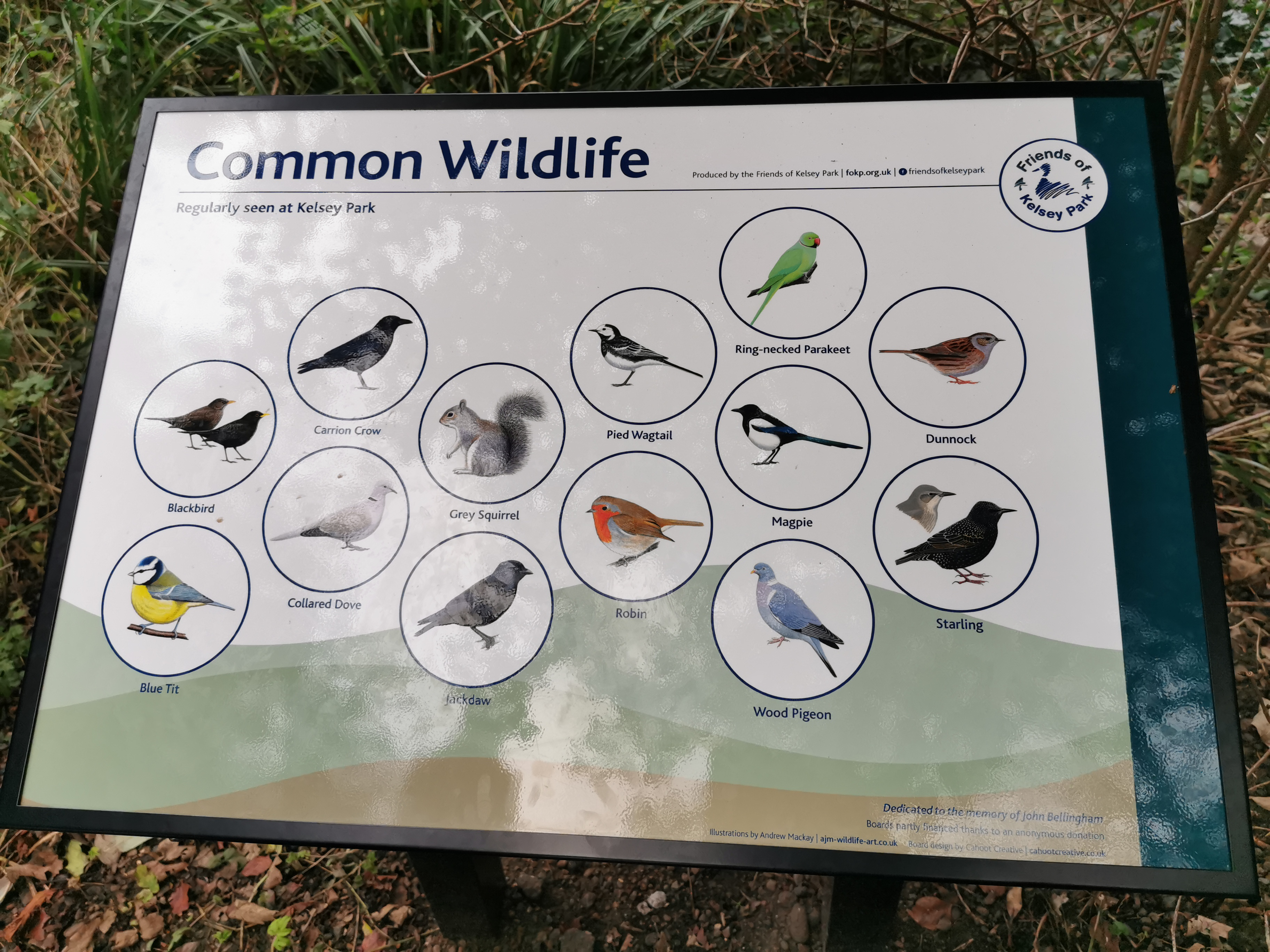
More wildlife of Kelsey Park

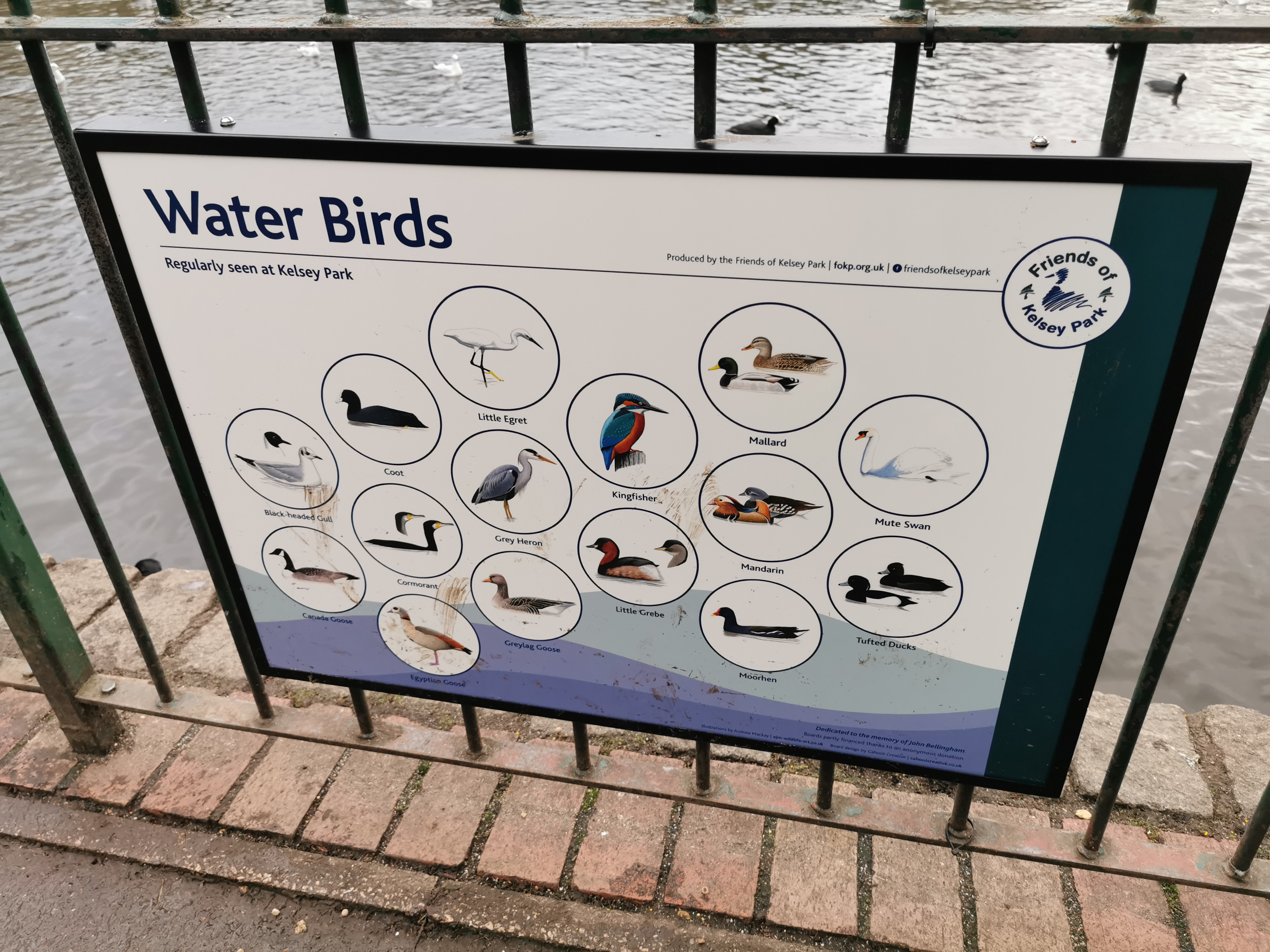
Water birds of Kelsey Park
