= 2006 Epping Forest District Council election =

2006 UK local government election

- 4 May 2006

18 of 58 seats on Epping Forest District Council 30 seats needed for a majority
- Turnout: 43.8% (▲6.2%)

	First party	Second party	Third party
Leader	Diana Collins	Michael Heavens (Resigning)	Patricia Richardson
Party	Conservative	Liberal Democrats	BNP
Leader's seat	Passingford	Buckhurst Hill West	Loughton Fairmead
Last election	26 seats, 42.7%	14 seats, 30.8%	3 seats, 3.8%
Seats before	26	14	3
Seats won	29	13	6
Seat change	▲3	▼1	▲3
Popular vote	13,226	7,778	1,679
Percentage	43.9%	25.8%	5.6%
Swing	▲1.2%	▼5.0%	▲1.8%
	Fourth party	Fifth party	Sixth party
Leader	Peter House	N/A	Steve Barnes (Defeated)
Party	Loughton Residents	Independent inc. CRA	Labour
Leader's seat	Loughton Forest	N/A	Loughton Fairmead
Last election	6 seats, 12.8%	5 seats, 3.8%	4 seats, 4.6%
Seats before	6	5	4
Seats won	5	4 (Note: Daphne Borton (Nazeing), John Knapman (CRA - Chigwell Village), Richard Morgan (Hastingwood, Matching and Sheering Village), and Stephen Murray (Loughton Roding))	1
Seat change	▼1	▼1	▼3
Popular vote	2,926	2,405	1,700
Percentage	9.7%	8.0%	5.6%
Swing	▼3.1%	▲4.8%	▲1.0%
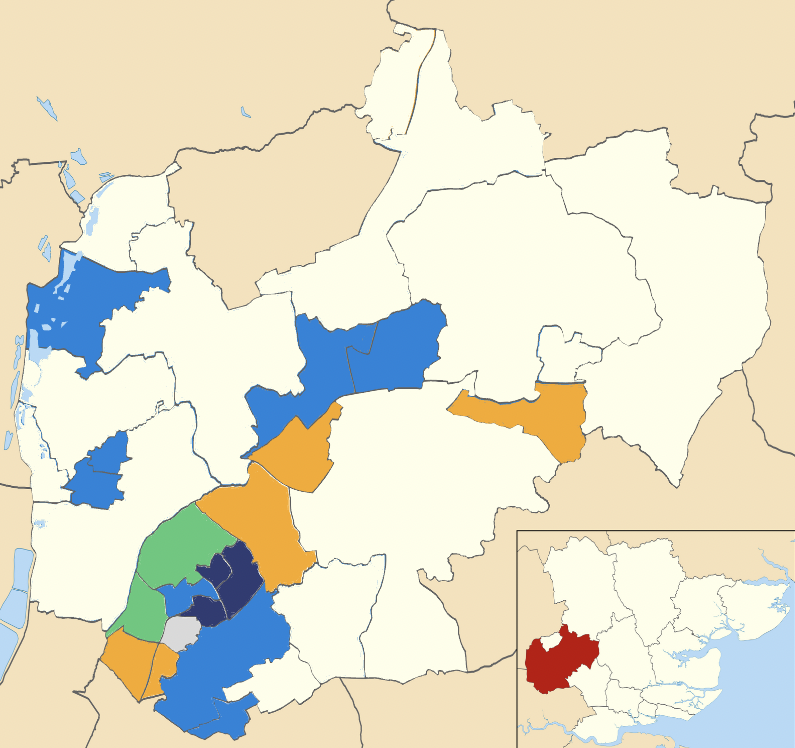
- Results of the 2006 District Council elections

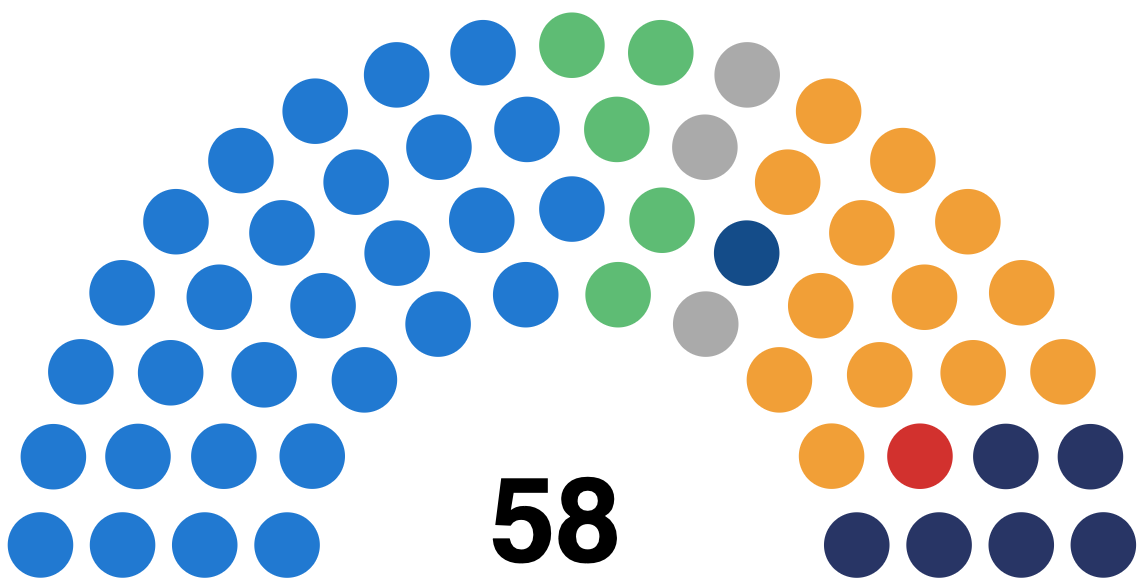
- Council composition following the election
Council control before election
No overall control
Conservative largest party
Council control after election
No overall control
Conservative largest party

Elections to Epping Forest Council were held on 4 May 2006. One third of the council was up for election and the council stayed under no overall control.

The Labour Party was reduced to one seat following wipeout of their representation in Loughton – remaining Labour councillor, Peter Gode of Shelley would resign in 2015. Stephen Murray, Labour councillor for Loughton Roding, defected and became an Independent. This election also marks the most recent time a Conservative has won a seat in Loughton.

The Liberal Democrats lost another seat, whilst the Loughton Residents Association also lost a seat to the British National Party, who doubled their representation and increased their vote share. Three Independents remained on the council, and Chigwell Residents Association councillor, John Knapman (who groups with the Loughton Residents Association) continued to serve out their terms.

This would be the last election in which the Conservatives would not have control of the council. This would change following a by-election in Grange Hill in December 2006 which would see the Conservatives cross the majority threshold and assume control of the chamber.

== By-elections ==
=== Lower Sheering by-election ===
Lower Sheering by-election 23 June 2005
Party	Candidate	Votes	%	±%
Conservative	Heather Harding	208	70.7	▼1.4
Labour	Benjamin Slasberg	64	21.8	N/A
Liberal Democrats	John Rumble	22	7.5	▼20.4
Majority		144	48.9	▲4.7
Turnout		294	18.5	▼1.0
Conservative hold		Swing		

=== Chigwell Village by-election ===
N.B: The Conservative figure is marked as N/A because the last election this ward was contested in did not feature a Conservative candidate, rather a Chigwell Residents Association candidate

Chigwell Village by-election 30 June 2005
Party	Candidate	Votes	%	±%
Conservative	Charles Scrutton	363	59.3	N/A
Liberal Democrats	Alan Lion	249	40.7	▲29.2
Majority		114	18.6	▼49.8
Turnout		612	19.7	▼18.2
Conservative hold		Swing		

== Ward results ==
=== Buckhurst Hill East ===
Buckhurst Hill East
Party	Candidate	Votes	%	±%
Liberal Democrats	Peter Spencer	801	61.3	▲8.7
Conservative	George Denny	506	38.7	▲4.8
Majority		295	22.6	▲3.9
Turnout		1,307	40.4	▼0.9
Liberal Democrats hold		Swing		

=== Buckhurst Hill West ===
Buckhurst Hill West (2)
Party	Candidate	Votes	%	±%
Liberal Democrats	Ann Haigh	1,066	51.2	▼0.5
Conservative	Robert Church	1,015	48.8	▲0.5
Conservative	Haluk Ulkun	1,009		
Liberal Democrats	Carol Taylor	970		
Turnout		4,060	42.7	▲1.5
Liberal Democrats hold		Swing		
Conservative gain from Liberal Democrats		Swing		

=== Chigwell Village ===
Chigwell Village
Party	Candidate	Votes	%	±%
Conservative	Lesley Wagland	892	80.4	N/A
Liberal Democrats	Jeffrey Stollar	217	19.6	▲3.8
Majority		675	60.8	▼7.6
Turnout		1,109	35.9	▼2.0
Conservative hold		Swing		

=== Chipping Ongar, Greensted and Marden Ash ===
Chipping Ongar, Greensted and Marden Ash
Party	Candidate	Votes	%	±%
Liberal Democrats	Derek Jacobs	590	39.3	▼18.9
Conservative	Glyn Pritchard	560	37.3	▼4.5
English Democrat	Robin Tilbrook	250	16.6	N/A
Labour	Roger McNulty	102	6.8	▲6.8
Majority		30	2.0	▼14.4
Turnout		1,502	47.8	▲15.1
Liberal Democrats hold		Swing		

=== Epping Hemnall ===
Epping Hemnall
Party	Candidate	Votes	%	±%
Liberal Democrats	Janet Whitehouse	1,105	49.7	▲4.9
Conservative	Brian Rolfe	1,002	45.0	▲1.9
Labour	Paul Handford	118	5.3	N/A
Majority		103	4.7	▼7.4
Turnout		2,225	47.5	▲5.5
Liberal Democrats hold		Swing		

=== Epping Lindsey and Thornwood Common ===
Epping Lindsey and Thornwood Common
Party	Candidate	Votes	%	±%
Conservative	Matthew Colling	1,060	58.6	▼3.1
Liberal Democrats	Janet Hedges	552	30.5	▲5.8
Labour	Anne Baldwin	198	10.9	N/A
Majority		508	28.1	▼8.9
Turnout		1,810	38.3	▼2.2
Conservative hold		Swing		

=== Grange Hill ===
Grange Hill
Party	Candidate	Votes	%	±%
Conservative	Gagan Mohindra	908	51.6	▼2.3
Liberal Democrats	Alan Lion	753	42.8	▼3.3
Independent	Anthony Du Varene	97	5.5	▲5.5
Majority		155	8.8	▲1.0
Turnout		1,758	38.0	▼0.9
Conservative gain from Liberal Democrats		Swing		

=== Loughton Alderton ===
Loughton Alderton
Party	Candidate	Votes	%	±%
BNP	Rodney Law	518	37.6	▲9.6
Loughton Residents	Rosemary Brookes	401	29.1	▲6.2
Conservative	Ben Glassman	226	16.4	▼5.9
Labour	Maureen Boatman	181	13.2	▼6.6
Liberal Democrats	David Robertshaw	50	3.6	▼3.5
Majority		117	8.5	▲3.4
Turnout		1,376	42.3	▲7.7
BNP gain from Labour		Swing		

=== Loughton Broadway ===
Loughton Broadway
Party	Candidate	Votes	%	±%
BNP	Susan Clapp	537	39.3	▲5.7
Labour	Thomas Owen	429	31.4	▲4.2
Conservative	Lorne Daniel	204	14.9	▼9.5
Independent	Peter Relph	112	8.2	N/A
Liberal Democrats	Peter Sinfield	84	6.1	▼8.8
Majority		108	7.9	▲1.5
Turnout		1,366	45.0	▲9.2
BNP gain from Labour		Swing		

=== Loughton Fairmead ===
Loughton Fairmead
Party	Candidate	Votes	%	±%
BNP	Peter Turpin	427	34.5	▲7.9
Loughton Residents	James Dean	424	34.3	▲9.0
Conservative	Benjamin Murphy	192	15.5	▼2.1
Labour	Stephen Barnes	151	12.2	▼9.4
Liberal Democrats	Neil Woollcott	43	3.5	▼5.4
Majority		3	0.2	▼1.1
Turnout		1,237	42.1	▲10.7
BNP gain from Labour		Swing		

=== Loughton Forest ===
Loughton Forest
Party	Candidate	Votes	%	±%
Loughton Residents	Peter House	734	47.8	▲10.7
Conservative	Matthew Daniel	654	42.6	▼5.4
Labour	Marion Taylor	89	5.8	▼4.3
Liberal Democrats	Christopher Spence	60	3.9	▼1.0
Majority		80	5.2	▼5.7
Turnout		1,537	47.7	▲3.4
Loughton Residents hold		Swing		

=== Loughton Roding ===
Loughton Roding
Party	Candidate	Votes	%	±%
Independent	Stephen Murray	1,087	67.5	N/A
Conservative	Valerie Metcalfe	229	14.2	▼4.2
BNP	Jacqueline Carne	197	12.2	N/A
Labour	Louis Appiah	52	3.2	▼11.5
Liberal Democrats	Peter Fuller	45	2.8	▼11.1
Majority		858	53.3	▼8.7
Turnout		1,610	46.4	▲8.2
Independent gain from Labour		Swing		

=== Loughton St. John's ===
Loughton St. John's
Party	Candidate	Votes	%	±%
Loughton Residents	John Markham	807	56.9	▲3.9
Conservative	Matthew Hayday	482	34.0	▼0.3
Labour	Jill Bostock	84	5.9	▼1.4
Liberal Democrats	Theresa Spence	46	3.2	▼2.1
Majority		325	22.9	▲4.2
Turnout		1,419	44.0	▲3.8
Loughton Residents hold		Swing		

=== Loughton St. Mary's ===
Loughton St. Mary's
Party	Candidate	Votes	%	±%
Conservative	Mitchell Cohen	687	50.2	▲21.3
Loughton Residents	Rodney Barrett	560	40.9	▼14.4
Labour	Peter Sheen	75	5.5	▼2.9
Liberal Democrats	Enid Robinson	47	3.4	▼4.0
Majority		127	9.3	▼30.2
Turnout		1,369	44.0	▲4.5
Conservative gain from Loughton Residents		Swing		

=== Lower Nazeing ===
Lower Nazeing
Party	Candidate	Votes	%	±%
Conservative	Antoinette Cooper	750	56.3	▲27.4
Independent	Edgar Borton	437	32.8	▼21.8
Labour	Kelvin Morris	87	6.5	▼4.1
Liberal Democrats	Ingrid Black	58	4.4	▲0.7
Majority		313	23.5	▲20.9
Turnout		1,332	42.5	▲9.7
Conservative hold		Swing		

=== North Weald Bassett ===
North Weald Bassett
Party	Candidate	Votes	%	±%
Conservative	David Stallan	1,032	82.4	▲2.4
Liberal Democrats	John Rumble	221	17.6	▲6.0
Majority		811	64.8	▼3.6
Turnout		1,253	35.6	▲9.8
Conservative hold		Swing		

=== Theydon Bois ===
Theydon Bois
Party	Candidate	Votes	%	±%
Liberal Democrats	Roland Frankel	721	46.5	▼6.8
Conservative	Robert Glozier	693	44.7	▼2.0
UKIP	Michael McGough	136	8.8	N/A
Majority		28	1.8	▼4.8
Turnout		1,550	49.8	▲1.4
Liberal Democrats gain from Conservative		Swing		

=== Waltham Abbey Honey Lane ===
Waltham Abbey Honey Lane
Party	Candidate	Votes	%	±%
Conservative	Demetrios Demetriou	640	48.5	▼19.2
Independent	Michael Tobin	496	37.6	N/A
Liberal Democrats	Peggy Ayre	184	13.9	▼18.4
Majority		144	10.9	▼15.7
Turnout		1,320	30.2	▲3.6
Conservative hold		Swing		

=== Waltham Abbey Paternoster ===
Councillor Reginald Chidley, elected as a Conservative in 2002, resigned from the Conservative group and sat as an Independent. He was defeated in this election by a Conservative opponent.

Waltham Abbey Paternoster
Party	Candidate	Votes	%	±%
Conservative	John Wyatt	485	50.5	▼32.7
Independent	Reginald Chidley	176	18.3	N/A
Liberal Democrats	Philip Chadburn	165	17.2	▲0.4
Labour	Liam Conlon	134	14.0	N/A
Majority		309	32.2	▼34.2
Turnout		960	29.5	▲7.1
Conservative hold		Swing		
