= William Hayward =

William Hayward may refer to:

- William Hayward (bridge designer), 18th-century bridge designer as per Henley Bridge
- William Hayward (architect) (died 1823), architect who worked in Lincoln, England
- William Hayward Jr. (1787–1836), U.S. politician
- William Hayward, English sailor and captain
- William Hayward (politician) (1868–1943), member of the New Zealand Legislative Council, 1934–1941
- Bill Hayward (1868–1947), track and field coach
- William Hayward (American attorney), (1877-1944) American lawyer commanded the 369th Infantry Regiment
- William Hayward (New Zealand cricketer) (1909–1982), New Zealand cricketer
- Bill Hayward (educator) (born 1930), Australian educator and cricketer
- Bill Hayward (rugby union), rugby player
- William C. Hayward (1847–1917), American politician
- William Dutton Hayward (1815–1891), founder and namesake of the city of Hayward, California
- William Henry Hayward (1867–1932), English-born farmer and political figure in British Columbia
- William S. Hayward (1835–1900), baker, banker and mayor of Providence, Rhode Island
- William Thornborough Hayward (1854–1928), medical doctor in South Australia
- William Hayward Pickering (1910–2004), New Zealand rocket scientist

== See also ==
- William Haywood (disambiguation)
