= Liam Conlon =

British politician (born 1988)

The Honourable Liam Conlon MP
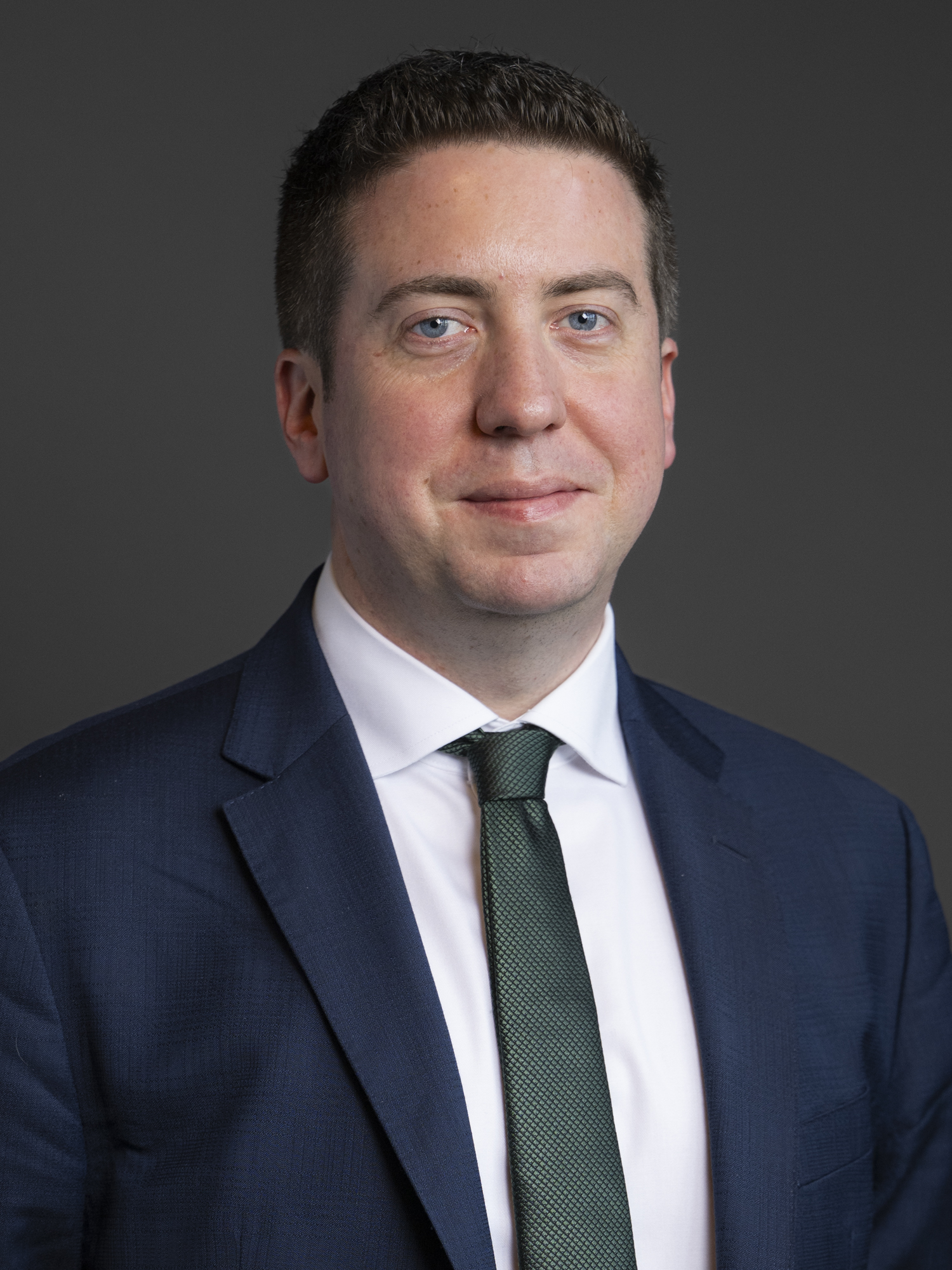
- Official portrait, 2024

Member of Parliament for Beckenham and Penge
- Incumbent
- Assumed office 4 July 2024
- Preceded by: Constituency created
- Constituency: Beckenham and Penge
- Majority: 12,905 (24.7%)

Personal details
- Born: Liam Joseph Conlon; March 1988 (age 38)
- Party: Labour
- Parents: William Conlon (father); Sue Gray (mother)

Liam Joseph Conlon (born March 1988) is a Labour politician who has served as Member of Parliament (MP) for Beckenham and Penge since July 2024. A member of the Labour Party, he previously served as the chairperson of the Labour Party Irish Society.

== Early life ==
Conlon is the son of Bill Conlon, a former country music singer, and his wife, former senior civil servant Sue Gray (now Baroness Gray of Tottenham), who served as Downing Street Chief of Staff under Sir Keir Starmer from July to October 2024.

At the age of 13, Conlon had an accident in which he shattered his right hip, leading to irreversible damage to his knee and spine; for four years following the accident he was unable to walk. He had extensive surgery on the NHS at both the Royal London Hospital, and the National Orthopaedic Hospital.

Conlon was held back a year at school due to the length of time he spent in hospital.

As a result of his injuries, Conlon became one of the youngest people in Britain to have a hip replacement on the NHS, aged 17. As a result of this, he is one of a handful of current disabled MPs, and drives an adapted car.

== Career ==
In the 2006 Epping Forest District Council election, Conlon was the Labour candidate in Waltham Abbey Paternoster ward.

Conlon spent two months on the government's international citizen service scheme in Burkina Faso, working at a Burkinabé NGO, Handicap-Solidaire Burkina. Following this, for the 2012 Paralympics, he hosted the Burkina Faso Paralympic Team at his home and secured them equipment.

Prior to becoming an MP, Conlon worked in the private sector for over a decade, first in strategy consulting working in retail and other sectors, and later in tech, including as Head of International Operations at Discovery Education UK.

In 2019, Conlon was elected Chair of the Labour Party Irish Society.

In 2023, Conlon was selected by Labour party members in the newly created constituency of Beckenham and Penge to be the Labour candidate in the 2024 general election.

== Parliamentary career ==
In 2024, Conlon was elected MP for Beckenham and Penge with a majority of 12,905 making him the first Labour MP in a constituency entirely in Bromley.

Conlon was appointed as a Parliamentary Private Secretary to the Department for Transport following his election.

In 2025, Conlon proposed Philomena's law in Parliament, which would create an indefinite capital disregard for payments made to survivors from Ireland's Mother and Baby Institutions Payment Scheme who live in Britain. Conlon’s campaign has been backed by public figures including Derry Girls actor and TV presenter Siobhan McSweeney. Following Conlon's campaign, the British Government agreed to disregard payments under Ireland’s Mother and Baby Redress Scheme at the 2026 UK-Ireland Summit.

Conlon was one of the first London MPs to warn publicly of the threat of Reform UK, saying ‘they must be taken seriously’ and that ‘Reform do not represent the values of our community here – where we see our diversity as a strength not a weakness, and something to unite us not divide us’.

Conlon is a member of Labour Movement for Europe and is strongly in favour of closer ties with Europe. He was one of the first MPs to speak in favour of a UK-EU Youth Mobility Scheme. In press interviews, Conlon has described Brexit as leading to “a lost decade”, and as “a disaster on nearly every level”.

Conlon is a supporter of the hospice movement. He has regularly called for a more sustainable funding model in Parliament, and has celebrated record funding for his local hospice, St Christopher’s Hospice.

Parliament of the United Kingdom
| New constituency | Member of Parliament for Beckenham and Penge; 2024–present | Incumbent |
