= River Beck =

River in the United Kingdom

Coordinates: 51.36468°N 0.02343°W

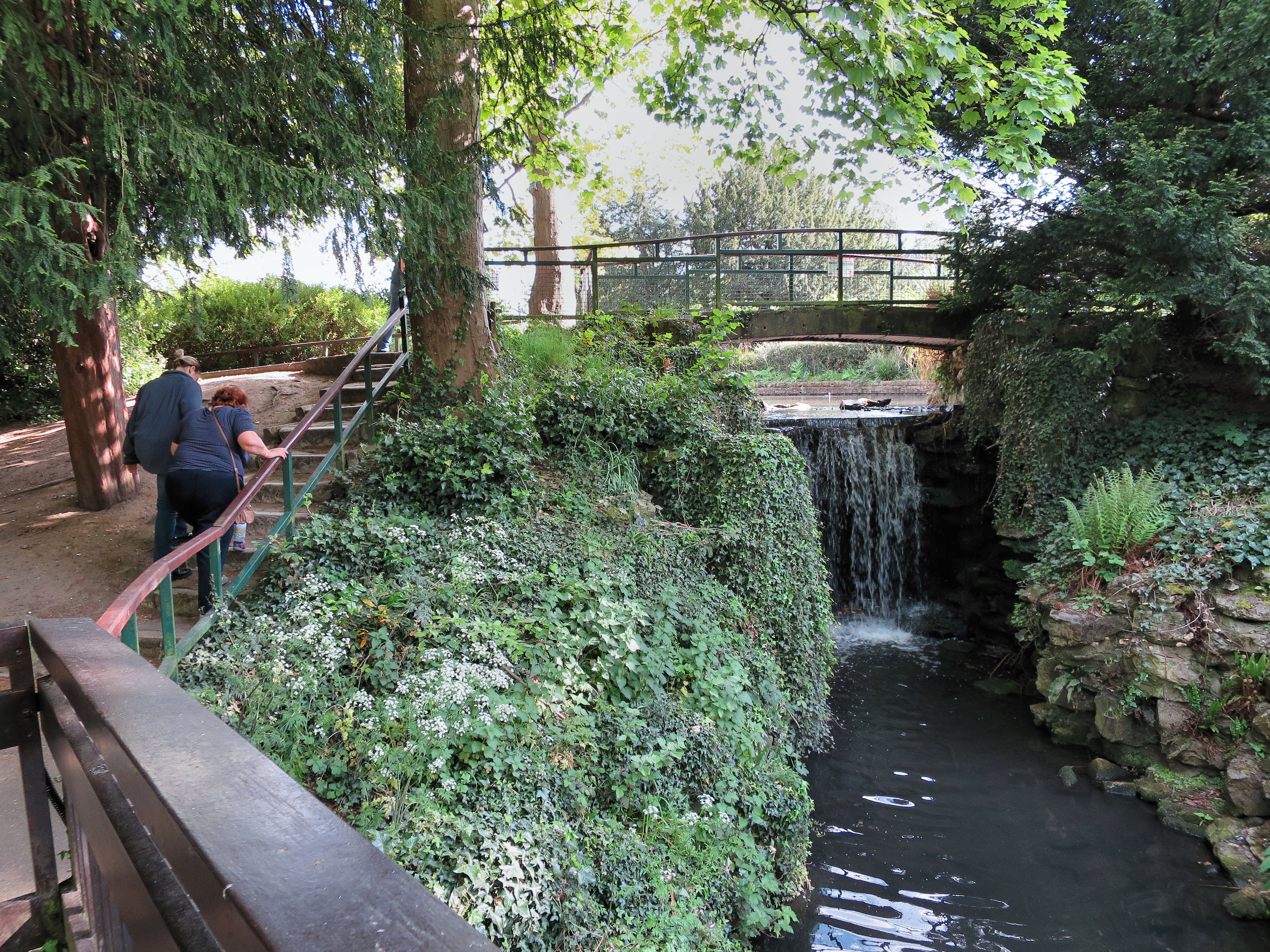
The River Beck in Kelsey Park

The River Beck is one of the tributaries of the River Ravensbourne in south London. The source of the River Beck is in Spring Park (grid reference TQ377647) where Shirley and West Wickham meet. For its first mile or so it forms the border between the London boroughs of Croydon and Bromley. Indeed, historically, this was also the border between Surrey and Kent. It gives its name to Beck Lane, Elmers End and Beck Way, Beckenham.

The Beck flows into Cator Park, where it is joined by the Chaffinch Brook. The river after this juncture is called the Pool River, until it joins the River Ravensbourne which in turn joins the River Thames.

The name probably derives from the town of Beckenham – Beohha's homestead (Old English). An alternative derivation may be the Middle English Beck (stream), which would be an example of a tautological name. However this usage is not common in southern England.
