= Beckenham =

Town in Greater London, England

Coordinates: 51.408°N 0.022°W

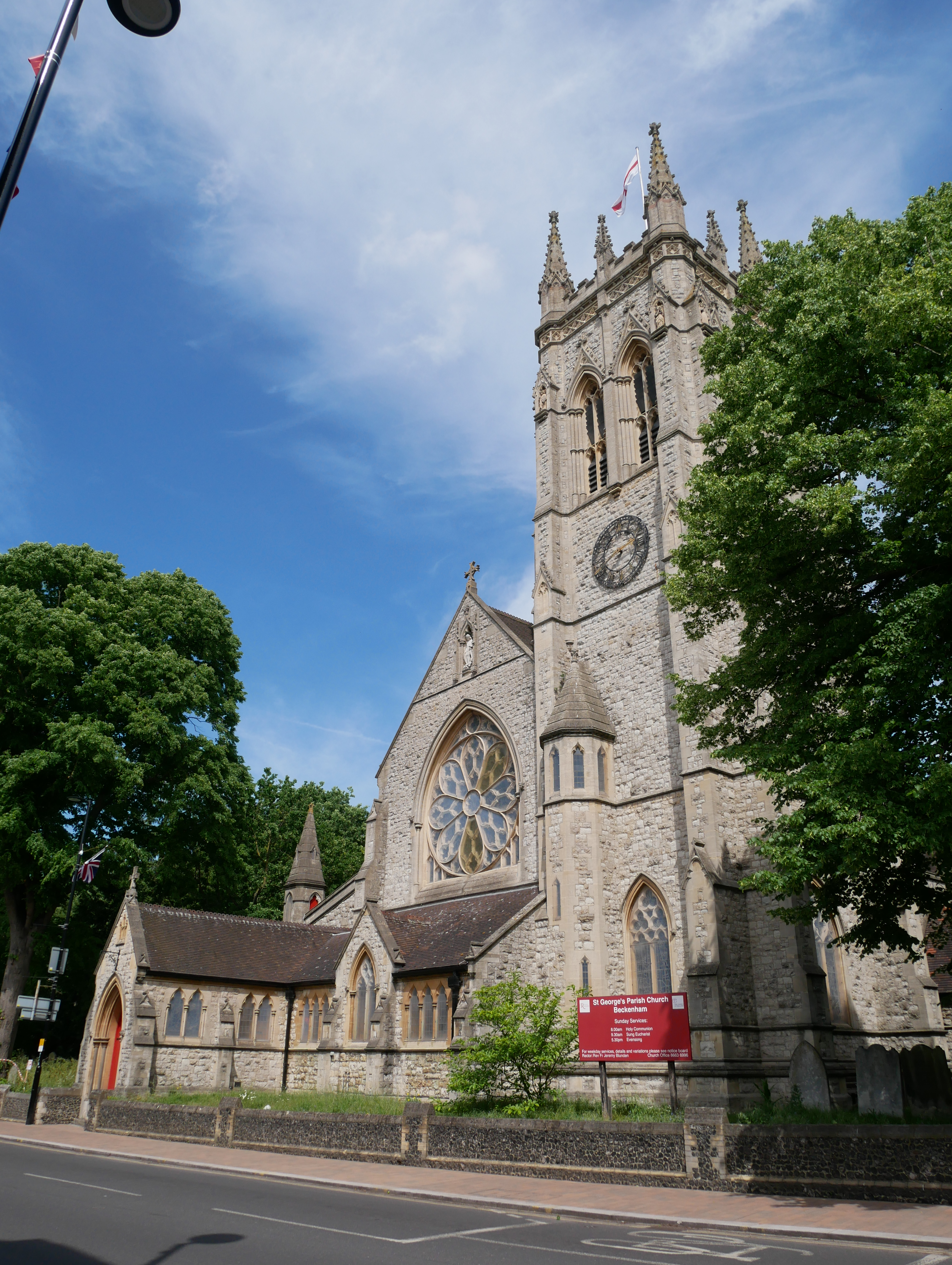
- The west face of St George's Church, Beckenham

- Location within Greater London
- Area: 13.22 km^{2} (5.10 sq mi)
- Population: 60,739 (2021 Census)
  - Density: 4,594/km^{2} (11,900/sq mi)
- OS grid reference: TQ3769
- London borough: Bromley
- Ceremonial county: Greater London
- Region: London
- Country: England
- Sovereign state: United Kingdom
- Post town: BECKENHAM
- Postcode district: BR3
- Post town: LONDON
- Postcode district: SE20
- Dialling code: 020
- Police: Metropolitan
- Fire: London
- Ambulance: London
- UK Parliament: Beckenham and Penge
- London Assembly: Bexley and Bromley

Beckenham (/ˈbɛkənəm/) is a town in south-east London, England, within the London Borough of Bromley. Prior to 1965, it was part of Kent. It is situated north of Elmers End and Eden Park, east of Penge, south of Lower Sydenham and Bellingham, and west of Bromley and Shortlands, and 8.4 miles (13.5 km) south-east of Charing Cross. Its population in 2021 was 60,739. (Note: Beckenham is made up of four wards in the London Borough of Bromley: Beckenham Town and Copers Cope, Clock House, Kelsey and Eden Park, and Shortlands and Park Langley.)

Beckenham was, until the coming of the railway in 1857, a small village, with most of its land being rural and private parkland. John Barwell Cator and his family began the leasing and selling of land for the building of villas which led to a rapid increase in population, between 1850 and 1900, from 2,000 to 26,000. Housing and population growth has continued at a lesser pace since 1900.

Beckenham has areas of commerce and industry, principally around the curved network of streets featuring its high street, and is served in transport by three main railway stations — nine within the post town — plus towards its western periphery two Tramlink stations. In common with the rest of Bromley, the largest borough of Greater London by area, Beckenham has several pockets of recreational land which are a mixture of sports grounds, fishing ponds and parks.

== Etymology ==
The place-name 'Beckenham' is first attested in a Saxon charter of 862 as Biohhahema mearc. The settlement is referred to as Bacheham in the Domesday Book of 1086, and in the Textus Roffensis as Becceham. The name is thought to derive from Beohha's homestead (Beohha + ham in Old English). The name of the small stream here – the River Beck – is most likely to have been named after the village.

== History ==
Archaeological evidence at nearby Holwood Park, where Stone Age and Bronze Age artefacts have been found, reveals some evidence of early settlers. A Roman camp was sited here, and a Roman road, the London to Lewes Way passed through the district.

Early written history tells little of the area; there is an entry in the Domesday Book of 1086 and various records in Court Rolls, Feet of Fines and other historical documents. Thomas Philipott recorded it in his Villare Cantianum in 1659 based on the research of his father John Philipott. Hasted wrote about it in 1778 in his History and Topography of Kent based on Philipott's material. Lysons and others continued to record Beckenham Manor, Foxgrove Manor, Kelsey and Langley estates and Kent House Farm.

By the time of the arrival of the Normans, the manor of Beckenham encompassed much of what is modern Beckenham, with other areas covered by the estates of Foxgrove Manor, Kelsey and Langley. Although William the Conqueror's half brother, Bishop Odo, was overlord of all of Kent, the manor of Beckenham was held or enfeoffed to Anschil of Rochester. The manor became divided but eventually rejoined under the St. John family until Frederick St. John, 3rd Viscount Bolingbroke sold most of the manor to John Cator the younger in 1773. The manor house and its grounds had been exchanged with Peter Burrell, Lord Gwydir in 1757.

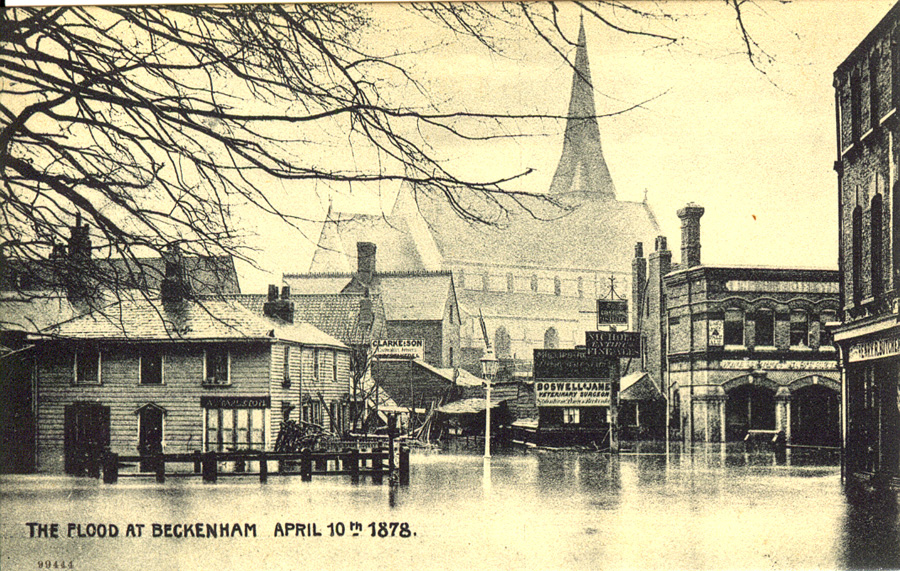
Central Beckenham, flooded in 1878.

Beckenham remained a small village until well into the 19th century. After Cator died in 1806, his heirs under his nephew John Barwell Cator became aware that an area relatively close to London was ripe for development, and the Cator estates and those of Lord Gwydir (who died in 1820) began to be split up, sold and developed, especially once the railway arrived in 1857, and large villas began to be built around the new station. Wide roads and large gardens epitomised these properties, often built by developers who acquired land from the Cators.

The manor of Foxgrove, previously owned by the Leigh family, passed into the ownership of Lancelot Tolson, circa 1716. His heirs divided it and it was acquired in part by John Cator and Jones Raymond. Raymond's part passed to the Burrells. After a land exchange in 1793 the northern parts of the manor joined Cator's estates; the southern parts were absorbed into the Burrells' Langley and Kelsey estates.

The Kelsey Estate, named from a manorial estate, Kelsies, was recorded in 1479. The estate was granted to William Kelshulle in 1408. The first Peter Burrell bought Kelsey in 1688; a house which had belonged to John Brograve was on the site. In the mid 18th century, a mansion was built overlooking the lake. This was later rebuilt, extended or altered, circa 1835, before being demolished in 1921, and the grounds became Kelsey Park. The only surviving buildings are the two Grade II listed lodge cottages at the entrance, which are over 200 years old.

In 1876 Beckenham Cemetery opened (originally Crystal Palace District Cemetery), located south of the town in Elmers End.

=== Modern Beckenham ===
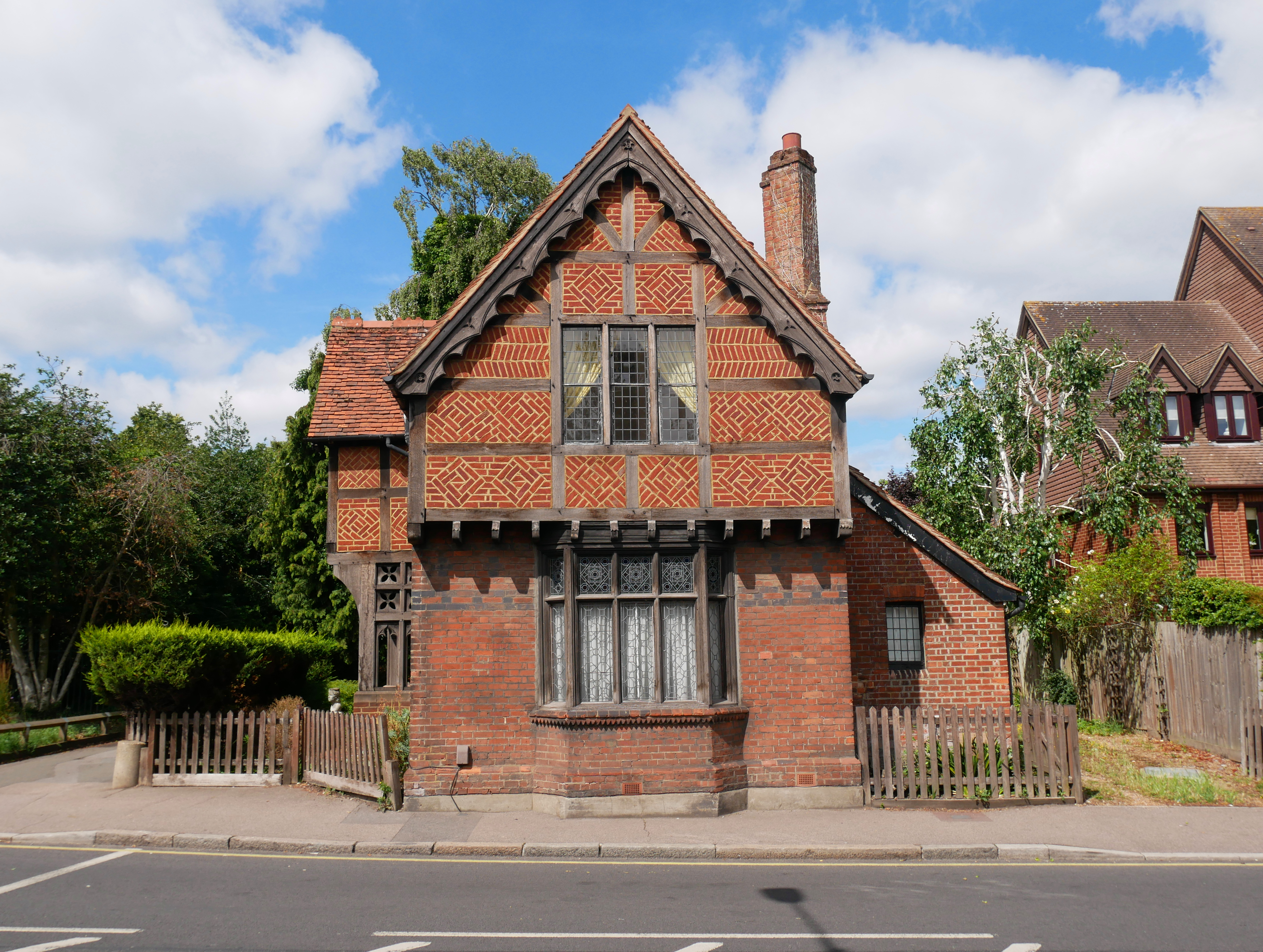
The late nineteenth-century Kelsey Lodge in Beckenham, now a Grade II listed building

Today Beckenham is an outer London suburb, though it has maintained its own identity and forms a town in its own right. It is centred on its non-pedestrianised curving high street. Further rows of shops run east from the town centre along Bromley Road, south along Croydon Road, and west along Beckenham Road around Clock House station, where the town's library can be found. To the north lies the New Beckenham area, essentially a residential suburb of Beckenham proper.

== Governance ==
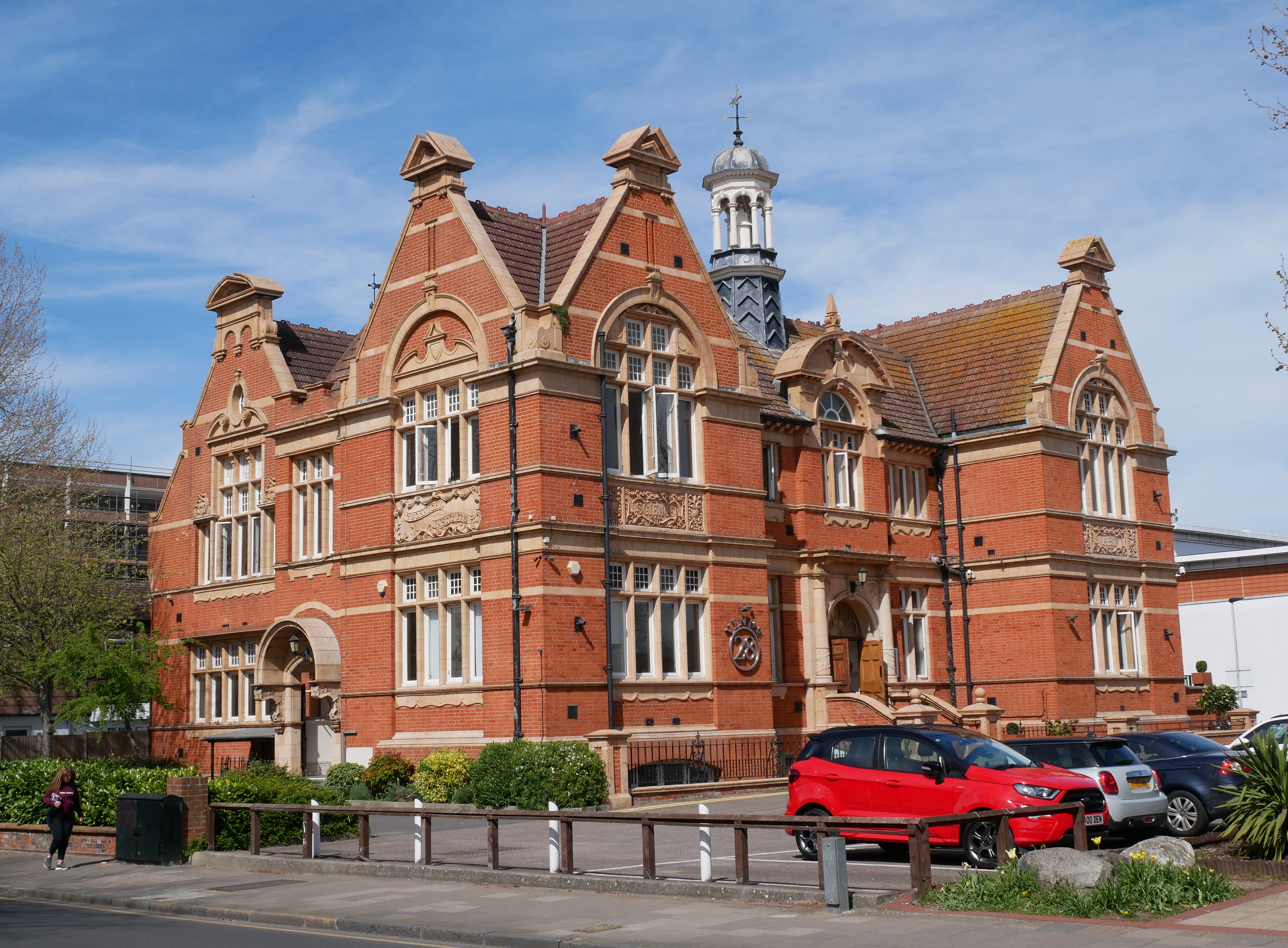
The Studio, a Grade II listed building in Beckenham

The Municipal Borough of Beckenham came into being in 1935. It took over from what had been, since 1894, Beckenham Urban District Council and included parts of Hayes and West Wickham, previously part of Bromley Rural District Council. The new Borough status reflected the growth of Beckenham in less than fifty years.

Prior to 1965, Beckenham was part of the administrative county of Kent. In 1965, as part of the creation of the Greater London Council, the Borough council was disbanded and Beckenham came under control of the newly constituted London Borough of Bromley. Councillors represent various parts of the Borough of Beckenham. Beckenham Town Centre Management coordinates business interests in the town. Since 2022, the Beckenham Town and Copers Cope ward has elected three councillors to Bromley London Borough Council.

== Geography ==
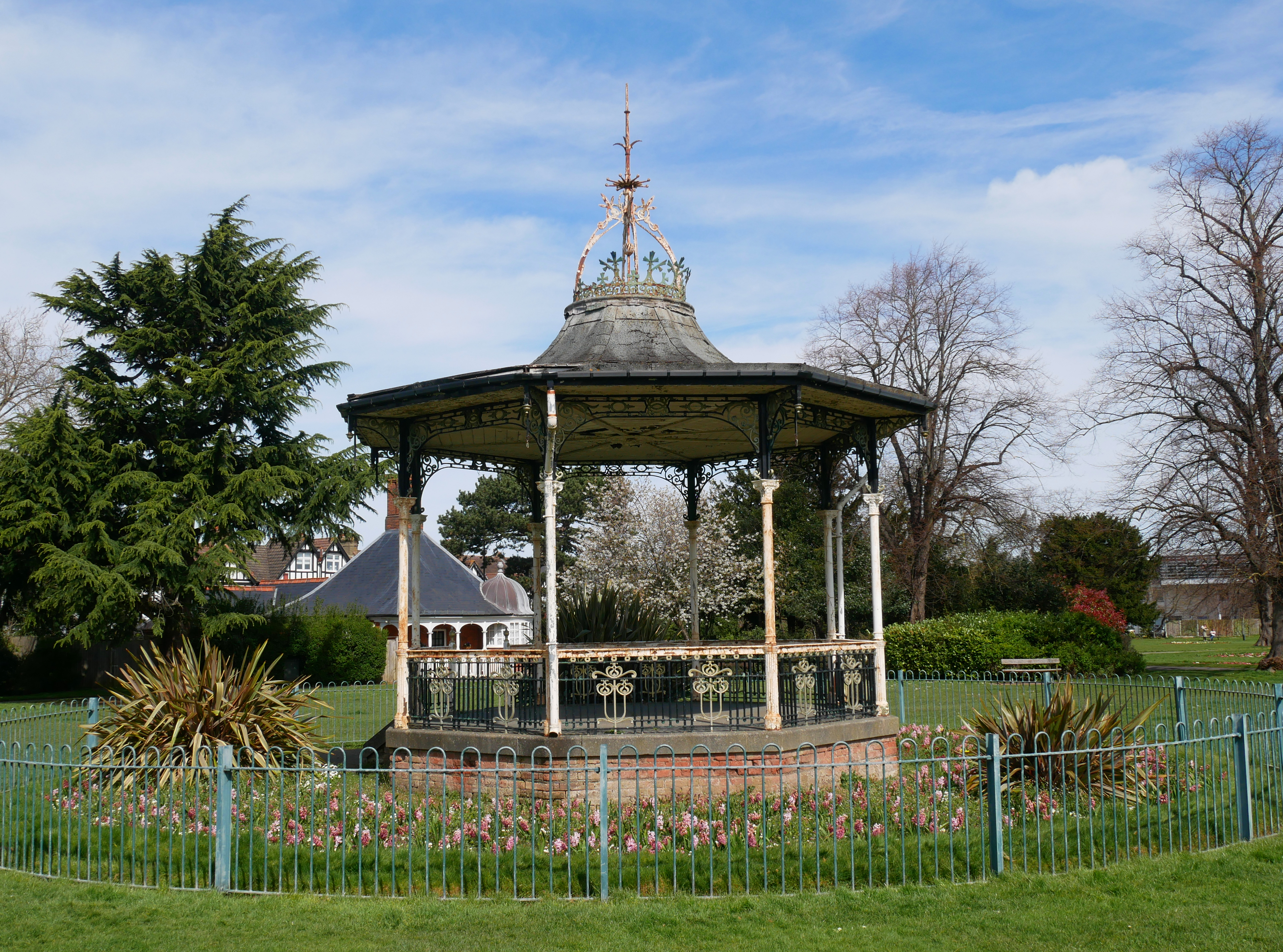
The "Bowie Bandstand" in Croydon Road Recreation Ground, site of one of musician David Bowie's earliest public performances; it is now Grade II listed.

Beckenham lies 1.7 miles (2.7 km) west of Bromley and 3.8 miles (6.1 km) north-east of Croydon.

The original village of Beckenham was a cluster of development surrounded by the lands of a series of manorial estates: Beckenham, Foxgrove, Kelsey, Langley and Kent House Farm with their mansions, halls and Parks. The parish boundary has changed over time but extended from Crystal Palace Park to Bromley and Lewisham to West Wickham.

The River Ravensbourne flows northwards at the eastern side of the town, towards its confluence with the River Thames forming an eastern boundary with Bromley. A small stream, the River Beck (sometimes referred to as the Hawkesbrook), passes through the town before joining the Ravensbourne via the Pool River further north near Catford.

The area is part of an outcrop of London Clay which were the basis for several brickworks during the development period with areas of Harwich Formation and consists of many small hills. Several gravel pits extracted parts of the Blackheath Beds which are now included in the Harwich Formation

== Economy ==
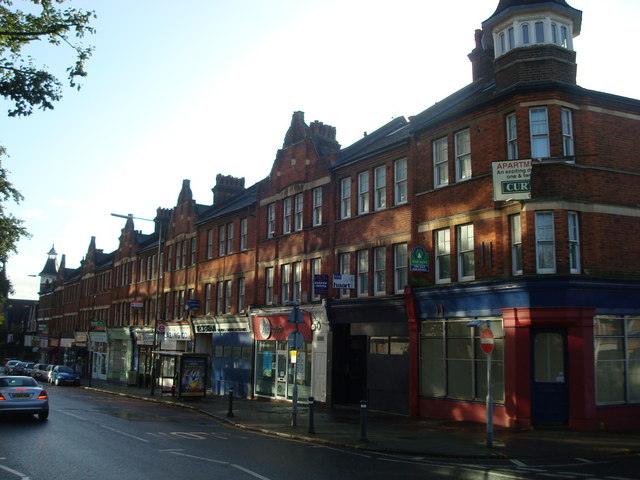
Victorian commercial buildings along Beckenham Road

Beckenham was the headquarters to Capita Registrars Limited, who provide share registration services for more than half of the UK's quoted companies; they have since moved from Beckenham. Proper Records, the UK's biggest independent music distributor, was originally based in Beckenham but relocated to Surrey Quays in 2017.

== Transport ==
=== Rail ===
Beckenham town centre is served by Beckenham Junction station, with further stations (Clock House, New Beckenham, Ravensbourne, Beckenham Hill and Kent House) serving the surrounding area.

Beckenham Junction and Kent House have services into central London every 15 minutes, taking 13 minutes to Brixton and 21 minutes to London Victoria.

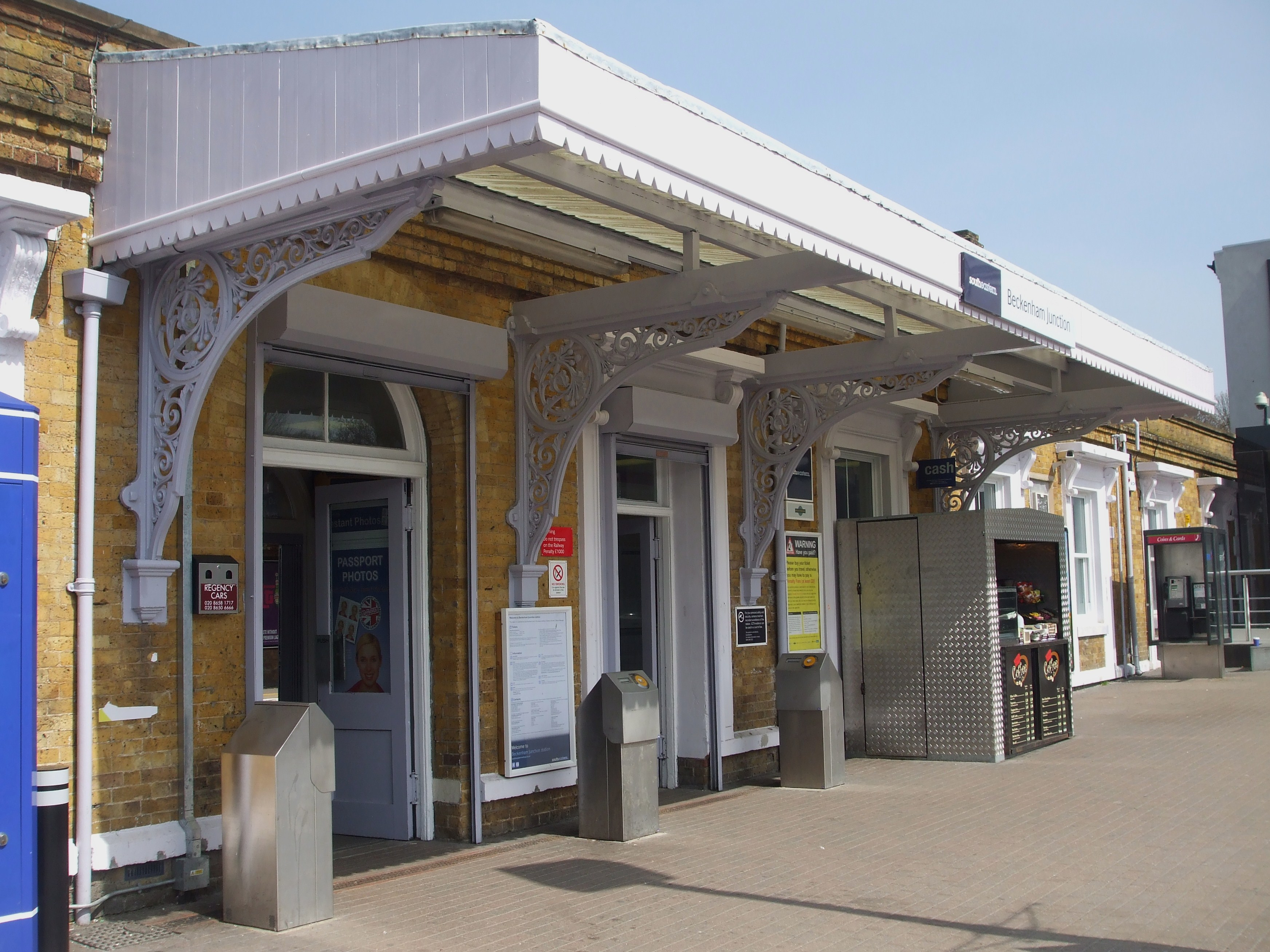
Beckenham Junction main entrance

Beckenham Junction also provides services into London Bridge every 30 minutes, taking 35 minutes, and to Orpington every 15 minutes, taking 7 minutes to Bromley South and 17 minutes to Orpington.

Ravensbourne and Beckenham Hill stations provide direct access to central London and the City every 30 minutes - Peckham Rye in 12 minutes, Elephant & Castle in 23 minutes, London Blackfriars in 27 minutes, City Thameslink in 29 minutes, Farringdon in 33 minutes and London St Pancras in 37 minutes.

New Beckenham and Clock House have services to London Charing Cross, London Bridge, Waterloo East, London Cannon Street and Hayes.

=== Tram ===
Tramlink serves Beckenham with services from Beckenham Junction and Beckenham Road to Wimbledon via East Croydon.

=== Buses ===
Beckenham is served by several Transport for London bus routes that link the town with other areas including Bromley, Catford, Chislehurst, Croydon, Crystal Palace, Eltham, Lewisham, Orpington, Penge, West Wickham and Woolwich.

== Religious sites ==
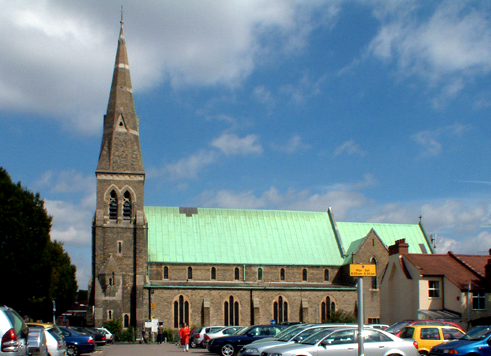
Christ Church, Beckenham

The town has a number of places of worship. St. George's Church (W. Gibbs Bartleet, 1885–1887) is the principal parish church, and is in the centre of Beckenham. It was extensively rebuilt at the end of the 19th century, but an earlier building dates back to 1100. It has a 13th-century lych gate that is thought to be one of the oldest in England. The almshouses next to the church date from 1694.

There are also three other Anglican churches in the town: All Saints Church; Holy Trinity Church; and St James at Elmers End. In addition, there are Methodist and Baptist churches; and the Roman Catholic St Edmund of Canterbury Church (J. P’Hanlon Hughes, 1937) on Village Way. Other town churches include: St. Barnabas on Oakhill Road (A. Stenning & H. Hall, 1878 or 1884), Christ Church, Fairfield Road (Thomas Blashill & William Hayward, 1876), St. James, St. James’ Avenue (A.R. Stenning, 1879–1898), St. Michael and All Angels, Ravenscroft Road (W. H. Hobday & F. H. Maynard, 1955–1956), St. Paul, Brackley Road (Smith & Williams, 1872), Holy Trinity, Lennard Road (E.F. Clarke, 1878), Baptist Church, Elm Road (Appleton & E. W. Mountford, 1889), Congregational Church, Crescent Road (J. W. & R. F. Beaumont, 1887–8), Methodist Church (James Weir, 1887).

Close to the cinema, a Christian Science Reading Room existed close to the site occupied by the postal sorting site in the 1980s. The site is now occupied by Kingsway church at 18 Rectory Rd. The postal office site is now occupied by Citygate Church.

== Demography ==
Defined by its historic parish area translated to today's modern wards of the United Kingdom, Beckenham covers four such wards. As a post town it had a population of over 82,000 people at the 2021 census.

2021 Published Statistics: Population
Ward	Usual residents	km^{2}
Beckenham Town and Copers Cope	16,728	3.29
Clock House	16,787	2.27
Kelsey and Eden Park	16,810	5.20
Shortlands and Park Langley	10,414	2.46

== Culture and leisure ==
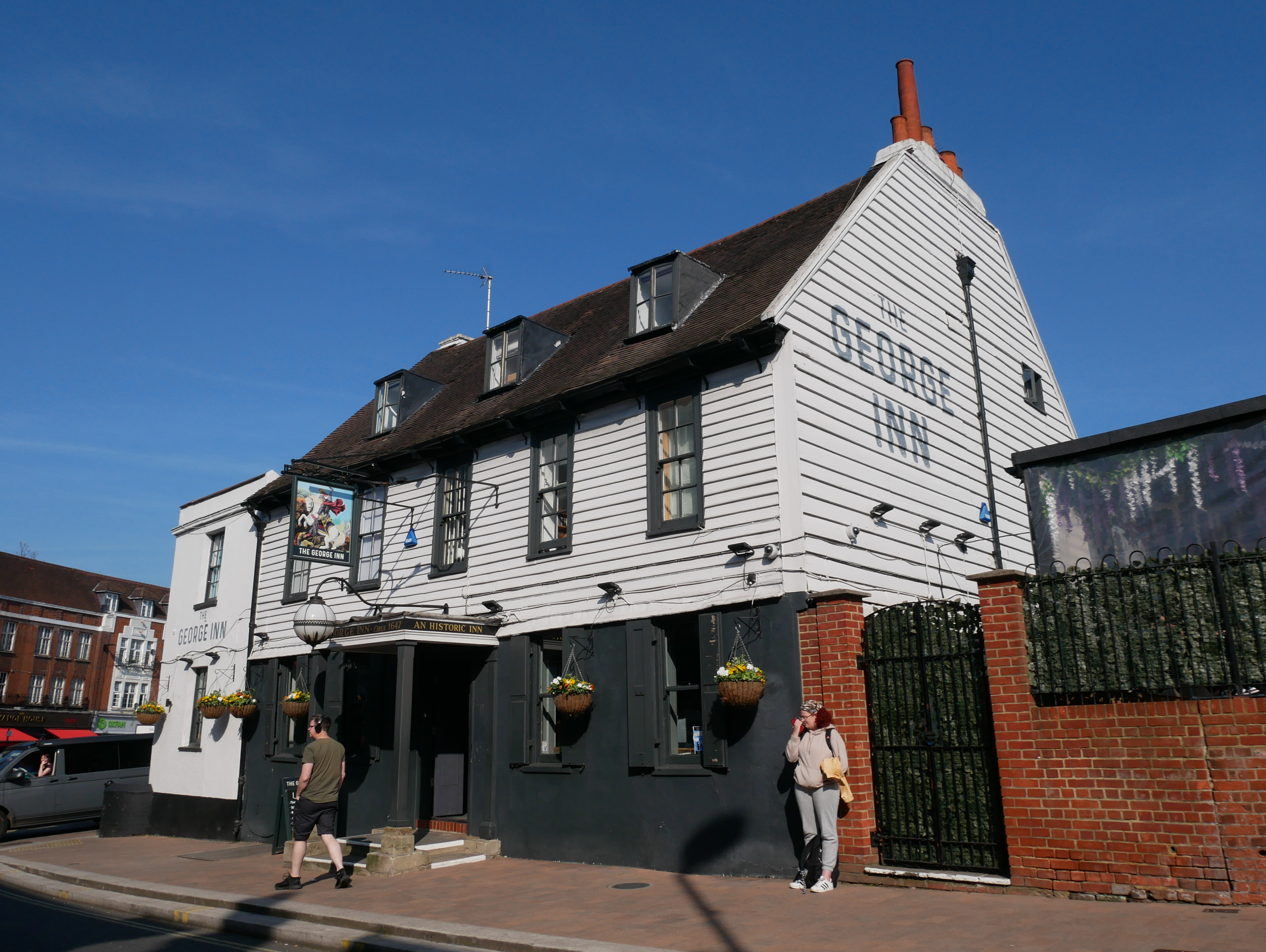
The George Inn, an 18th-century listed pub on the High Street

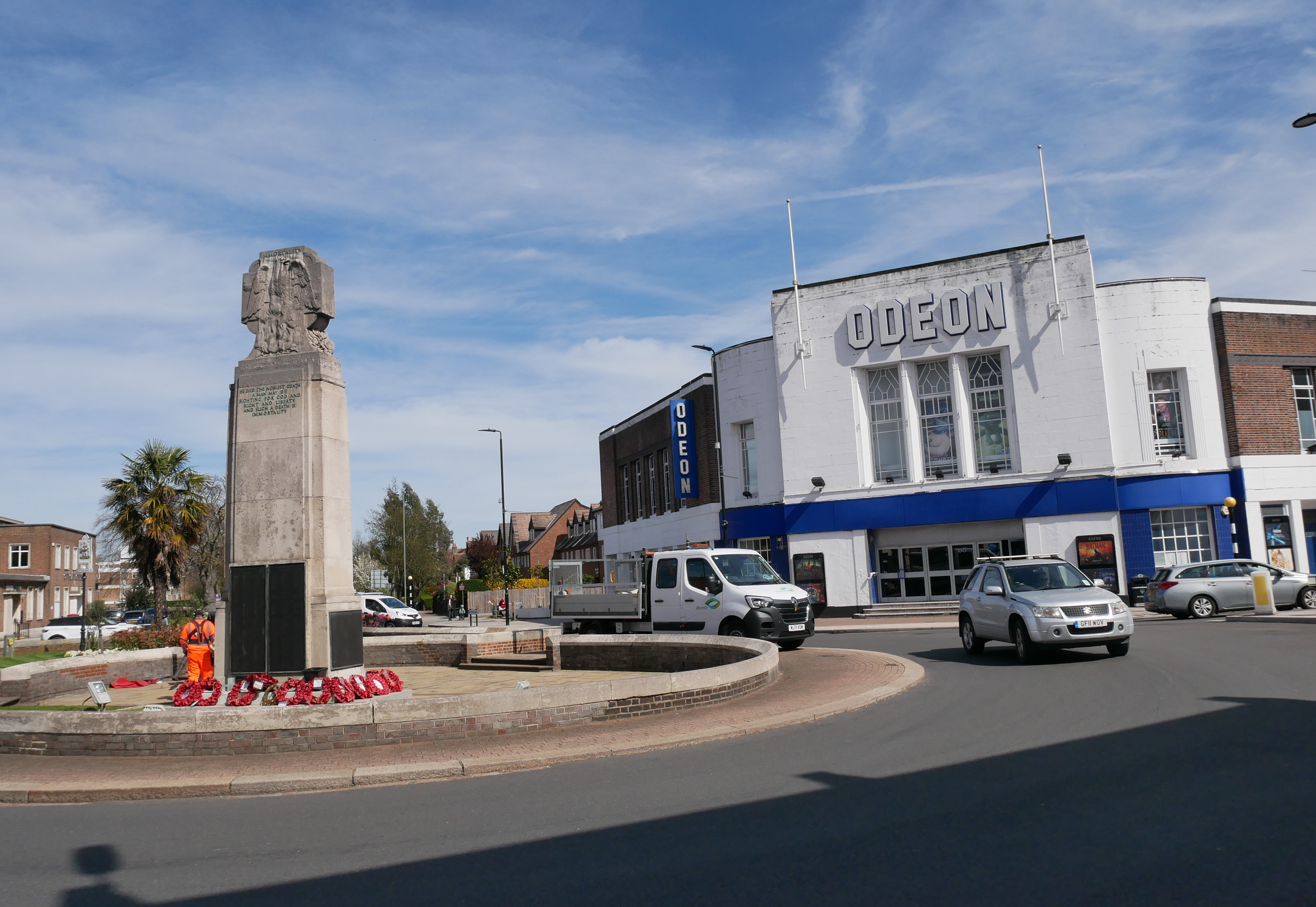
The war memorial and Odeon cinema, both Grade II listed

Like most towns of its size, Beckenham has several leisure organisations and societies. The local Odeon cinema has six screens and is a grade II listed building. The Beckenham Festival of Music and Dancing takes place every November. Beckenham Theatre puts on amateur productions. The Beckenham Concert Band is a community wind band which has, over the last 35 years, raised thousands of pounds for local and national charities. It caters for amateur wind and brass musicians and performs locally during the winter months and across London and the South East during the summer.

The South East London Green Chain, a long-distance footpath, passes through Beckenham. Both Cator Park and Beckenham Place Park form part of the Chain. Other open spaces in the town include Croydon Road Recreation Ground and Kelsey Park. Beckenham Green, in the town centre, hosts regular markets and activities throughout the year.

== Education ==
The principal secondary schools in Beckenham are Harris Academy Beckenham (formerly Kelsey Park Sports College), Harris Academy Bromley (formerly Cator Park School), the two Langley Park schools, for boys and for girls, and Orion Eden Park (formerly Eden Park High School).

There are also a large number of schools catering for primary education, including the independent Roman Catholic school, Bishop Challoner, St Mary's Catholic Primary School, Marian Vian Primary School, Balgowan Primary School, Worsley Bridge Primary School, Harris Primary Academy Beckenham (formerly Bromley Road Infants School), Clare House Primary School and Churchfields Primary School.

== Health ==
Beckenham Hospital, now called Beckenham Beacon, following redevelopment in 2009, is a minor treatment centre and an outstation to Princess Royal Hospital in Farnborough for outpatient services. It has GP, dental and other services available.

== Sport ==
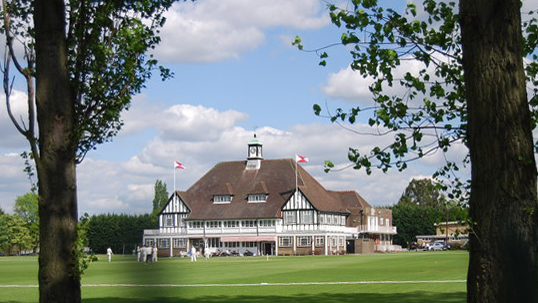
The HSBC Sports Pavilion in New Beckenham, home ground of New Beccehamian Hockey Club

Football club Beckenham Town plays in the Isthmian League at Eden Park Avenue. Sunday league team Beckenham Manor Football Club plays at Langley Sports Club.

Beckenham Cricket Club plays at Foxgrove Road, a former first-class cricket ground.

From 1886 to 1996, the club also staged the Kent Championships, an international tennis tournament, which featured many of the world's top players because it opened the grass-court season building up to The Championships at Wimbledon. In June 1968, the club held the world's first "open" grass-court tournament – one month after the sport became open to amateur and professional players – with Australians Fred Stolle and Margaret Court winning the singles titles.

Beckenham Rugby Football Club is a rugby union club formed originally in 1894. It fields six senior men's teams, a women's team, and also has one of the largest youth sections in the South East. Another rugby union club, Beccehamians RFC, founded in 1933, plays at Sparrows Den, near West Wickham.

Beckenham Cricket Club is also the home to Bromley and Beckenham Hockey Club.

Swimmers from Beckenham Swimming Club, established in 1893, have gained medals in the 21st century at national and international levels.

New Beccehamian Hockey Club play their home games at the HSBC Sports and Social Club adjacent to New Beckenham railway station. They currently have three men's and three ladies hockey teams and play competitive fixtures in the Kent Hockey League.

The training ground for Premier League club Crystal Palace is located on Copers Cope Road.

== Media ==
In Simon Brett's long-running BBC Radio 4 comedy drama No Commitments (1992–2007), Beckenham is the home of the snobbish, socially aspirational and insecure sister Victoria; the town is frequently mocked by association. Beckenham is also one of the main locations of the novel The Buddha of Suburbia (1990), by Hanif Kureishi.

== Notable people ==
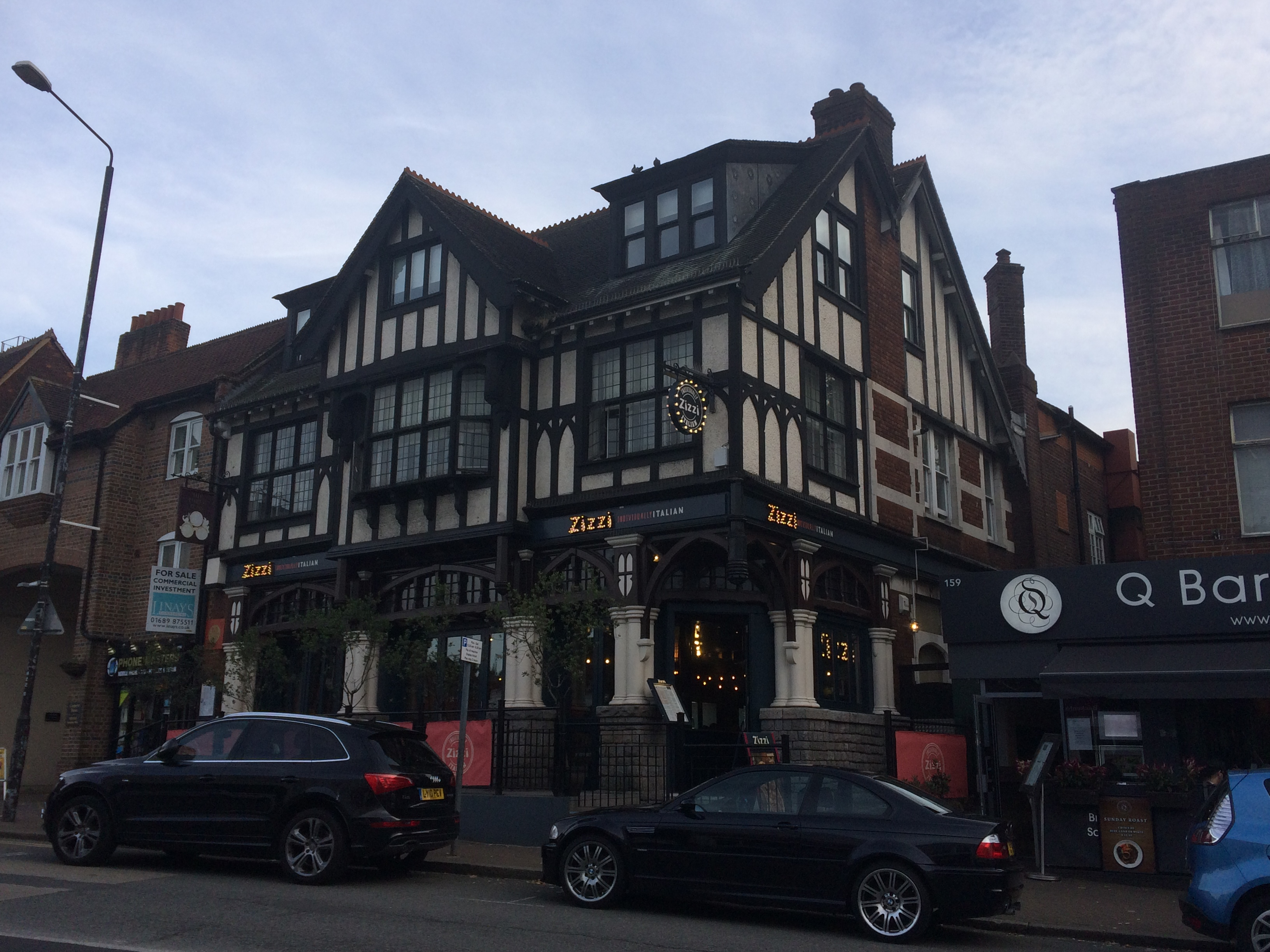
Zizzi pizza restaurant

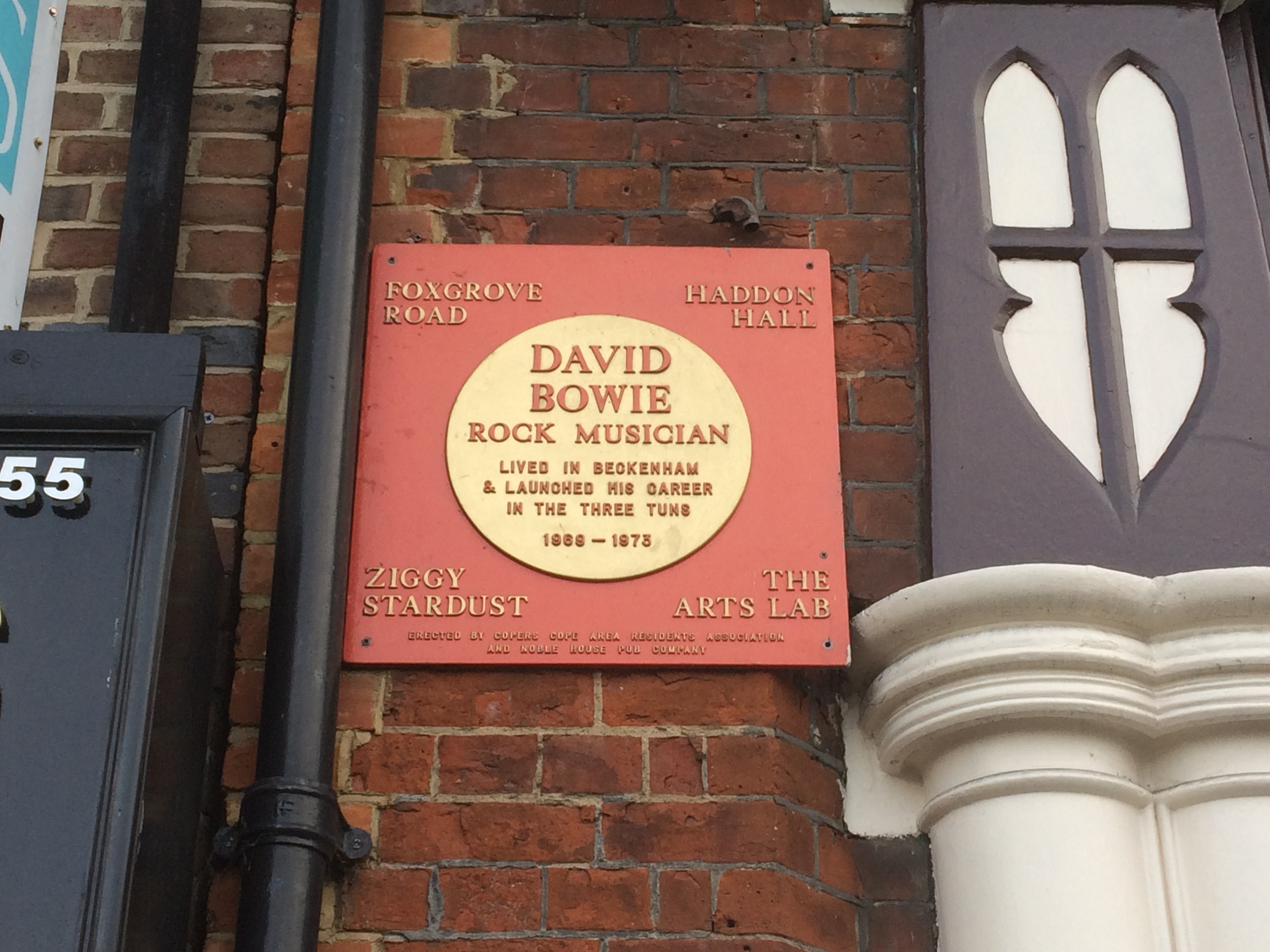
Close-up of plaque

The former Three Tuns pub (now a restaurant), with David Bowie plaque

Numerous prominent personages were born or have lived in Beckenham. In the world of politics and governance, these include the colonial administrator George Eden, 1st Earl of Auckland (1784–1849), politician and diplomat William Eden, 1st Baron Auckland (1745–1814), Admiral of the Royal Navy Sir Peircy Brett (1709–1781), Colour Sergeant Frank Bourne of Rorke's Drift (who lived at 16 King's Hall Road, Beckenham and is buried in Beckenham Cemetery), judge Wilfred Greene, 1st Baron Greene (1883–1952 – born at 8 Fox Grove Road) and Fr. Thomas Pelham Dale, an Anglo-Catholic clergyman prosecuted for Ritualist practices in the 1870s. Former British prime minister John Major lived at West Oak in Beckenham with his wife Norma from 1974 to 1978.

Writers include Enid Blyton who lived at 95 Chaffinch Road from 1897 to 1903, Walter de la Mare, who lived at 195 Mackenzie Road, and A.L. Barker (1918–2002).

Show business people include Bob Monkhouse (1928–2003), Julie Andrews, who lived on Cromwell Road, Floella Benjamin (now Baroness Benjamin of Beckenham), who grew up on Mackenzie Road, Maurice Denham (1909–2002), Simon Ward (1941–2012). and Betty Box (1915–1999) and her brother Sydney (1907–1983), both film producers.

Musician David Bowie (1947–2016) lived at 42 Southend Road from 1969 to 1973. Others from the area include Rolling Stones bassist Bill Wyman, who went to school in Beckenham, Peter Frampton, who was born in Beckenham, the musician David Sylvian, who was born in the town but raised in nearby Catford, Status Quo keyboardist Andy Bown who was born in Beckenham, and musician Anne Dudley of the band Art of Noise who is from the town.

Many sports personalities were born in Beckenham, especially cricketers, as well as Tom Pettitt (1859–1956), real tennis world champion 1885–90.

Scientist George Horace Brooke Thompson (1928–2025), was born in Beckenham. He was a physicist specialising in semiconductor lasers.

== Gallery ==
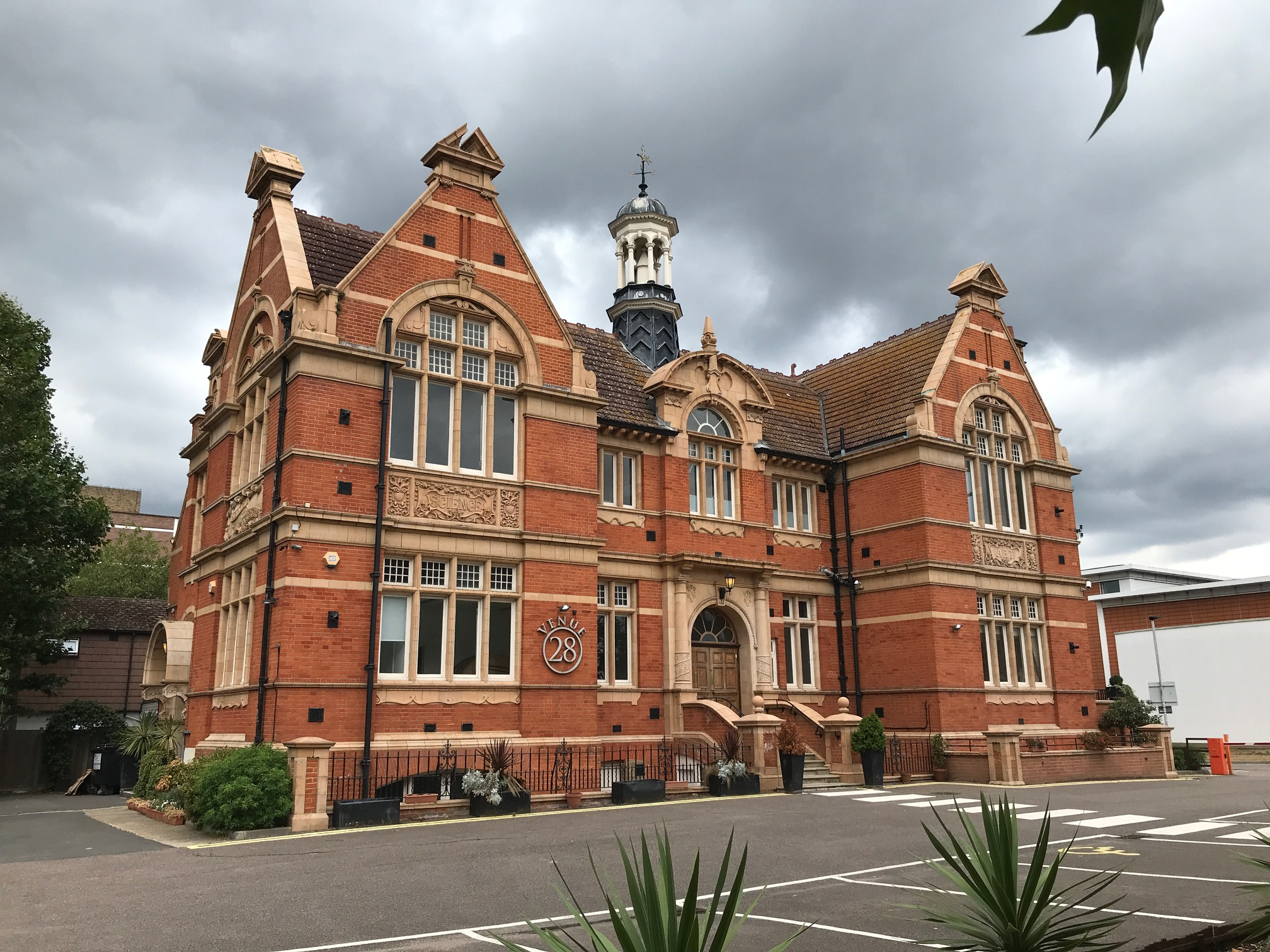
The former Beckenham Technical Institute, dating in 1898 and now listed at grade II

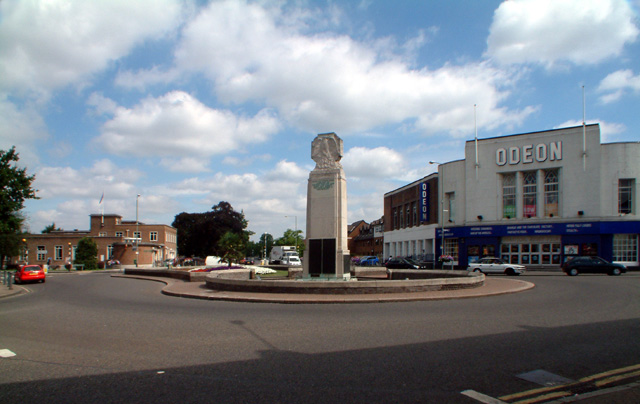
Beckenham War Memorial, with the Odeon cinema in the background

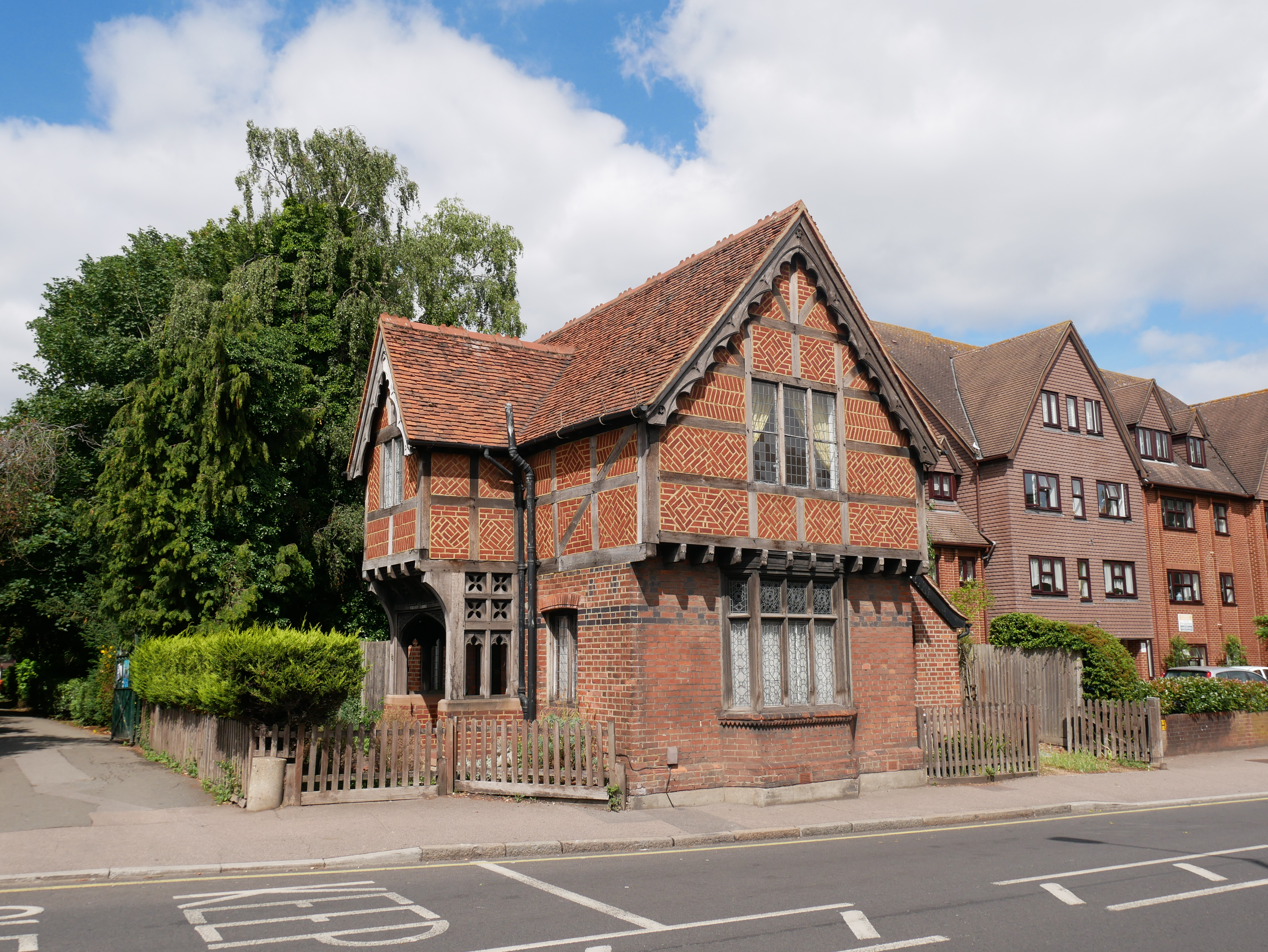
Kelsey Lodge

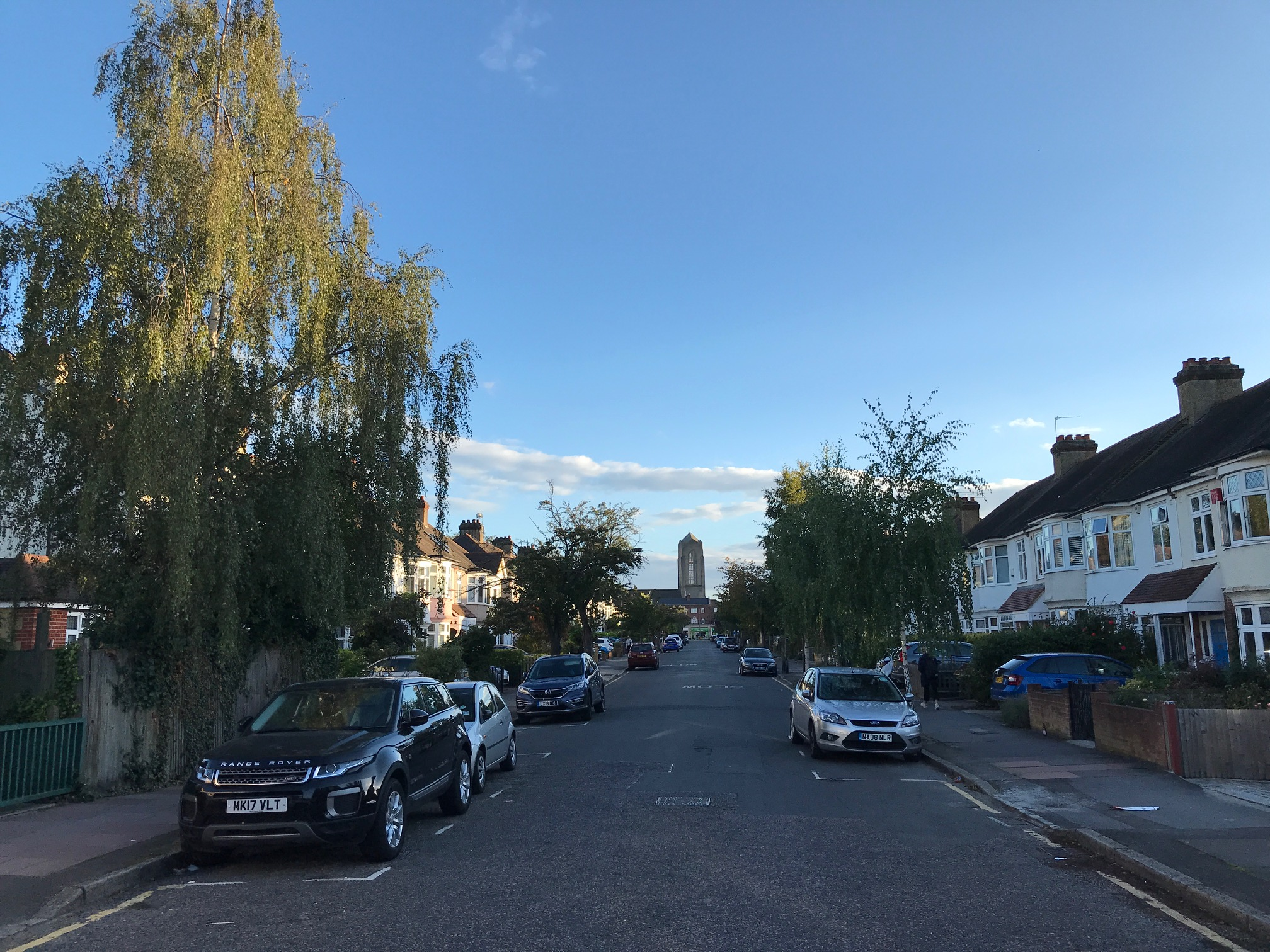
The Drive, a residential street off the High Street, with St Edmund's RC Church in the distance

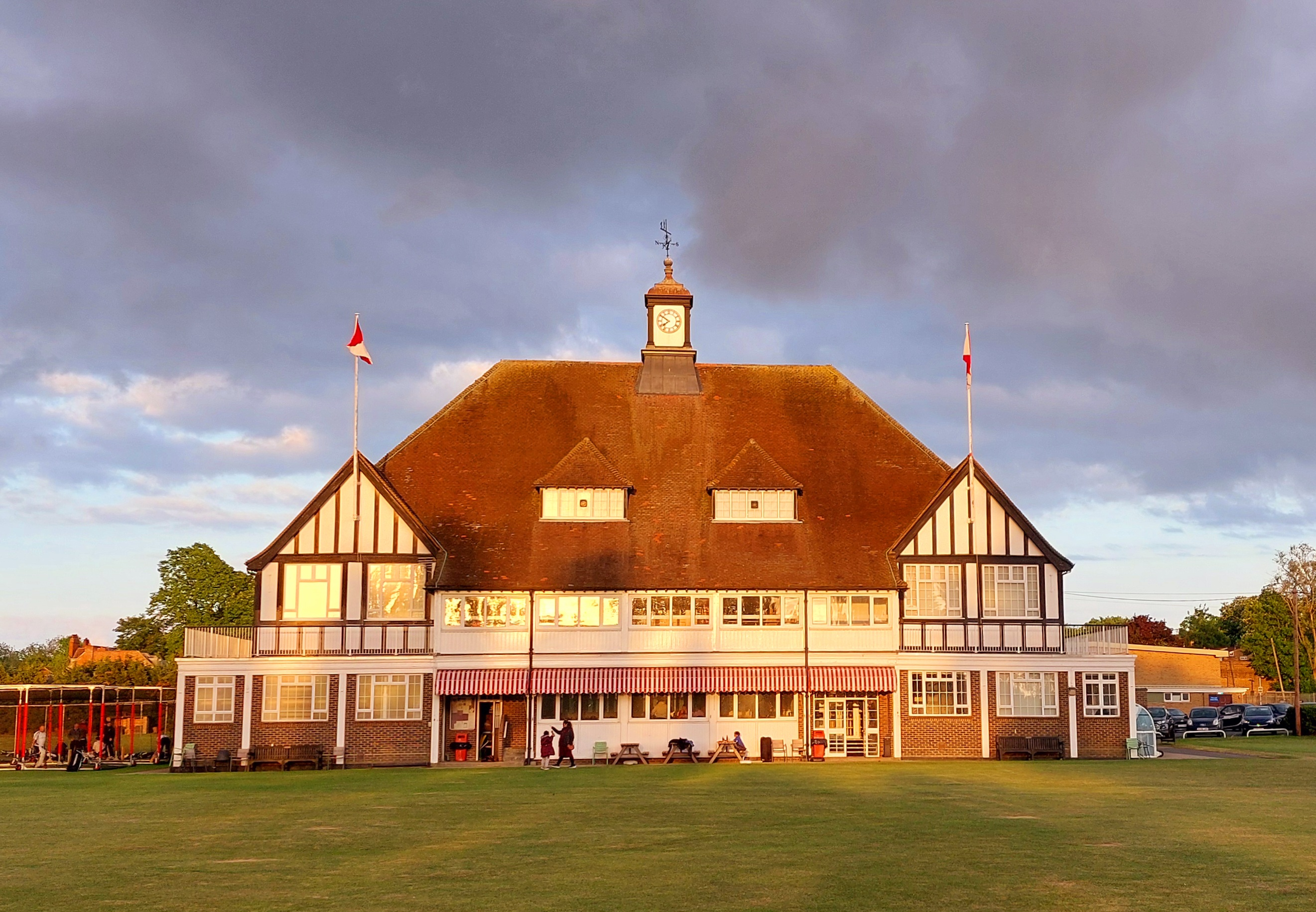
HSBC Sports and Social Club in New Beckenham - home to New Beckenham Hockey Club
