= William Haywood =

William Haywood may refer to:

- Bill Haywood (William Dudley Haywood, 1869–1928), American union leader
- William Henry Haywood Jr. (1801–1852), North Carolina senator
- William Haywood (architect) (1876–1957), British architect and town planner
- William Haywood (cricketer) (1841–1912), British cricketer
- William Haywood (engineer) (1821–1894), British Surveyor and Engineer to the City of London Commissioners of Sewers
- Bill Haywood (baseball) (born 1937), American baseball former pitcher, coach and manager

== See also ==
- William Hayward (disambiguation)
