= Kelsey and Eden Park =

Electoral ward in London, England

- Electoral ward for the Bromley London Borough Council
- Borough: Bromley
- County: Greater London
- Population: 15,465 (2021)
- Area: 5.087 km²

Current electoral ward
- Created: 2002
- Councillors: 3

Kelsey and Eden Park is an electoral ward in the London Borough of Bromley. The ward was first used in the 2002 elections and elects three councillors to Bromley London Borough Council.

== Geography ==
The ward is named after the suburbs of Kelsey Park and Eden Park.

== Councillors ==
Election	Councillors		
2018	Peter Dean (Conservative)	Diane Smith (Conservative)	Dave Wibberley (Conservative)
2022	Peter Dean (Conservative)	Diane Smith (Conservative)	Christine Harris (Conservative)

== Elections ==
=== 2022 ===
Kelsey and Eden Park (3 seats)
Party	Candidate	Votes	%	±%
Conservative	Christine Harris*	2,073	44.9	
Conservative	Peter Dean*	2,064	44.7	−4.7
Conservative	Diane Smith*	2,000	43.3	−5.0
Labour	Marie Bardsley	1,877	40.6	+10.2
Labour	John Dempster	1,691	36.6	+10.4
Labour	Stephen Scott	1,627	35.2	
Liberal Democrats	Gillian Hollamby	762	16.5	
Liberal Democrats	Stafford Fitch-Bunce	611	13.2	
Liberal Democrats	John Gorski	581	12.6	
Reform	Graham Reakes	105	2.3	
Turnout		4,622	39	
Registered electors		11,713		
Conservative hold		Swing		
Conservative hold		Swing		
Conservative hold		Swing		

=== 2018 ===
Kelsey and Eden Park
Party	Candidate	Votes	%	±%
Conservative	Peter Dean	2,563	49.4	−3.6
Conservative	Diane Smith	2,532	48.8	−2.2
Conservative	Dave Wibberley	2,412	46.5	−8.2
Labour	Marie Bardsley	1,579	30.4	+7.0
Labour	Naresh Chauhan	1,462	28.2	+8.0
Labour	John Dempster	1,358	26.2	+8.4
Liberal Democrats	Hayley Anderson	859	16.6	+1.8
Liberal Democrats	Taylor Matthews	675	13.0	+2.3
Liberal Democrats	Robert Jackson	670	12.9	New
Green	Gareth Thomas	553	10.7	New
UKIP	Valerie Butcher	214	4.1	−17.2
Turnout		14,877	42	
Registered electors		12,334		
Conservative hold		Swing		
Conservative hold		Swing		
Conservative hold		Swing		

== See also ==
- List of electoral wards in Greater London
