= Bromley London Borough Council elections =

Class of UK local elections

A map showing the wards of Bromley from 2002 until 2022

Bromley London Borough Council is the local authority for the London Borough of Bromley. The council is elected every four years.

== Political control ==
The first election to the council was held in 1964, initially operating as a shadow authority before the new system came into full effect the following year. Political control of the council since 1964 has been held by the following parties:

Election	Overall Control	Conservative	Labour	Lib Dem	UKIP	Reform	Ind/Localist
1964	Conservative	28	15	7	-	-	-
1968	Conservative	52	5	3	-	-	-
1971	Conservative	41	15	4	-	-	-
1974	Conservative	44	14	2	-	-	-
1978	Conservative	48	12	-	-	-	-
1982	Conservative	52	5	3	-	-	-
1986	Conservative	44	10	6	-	-	-
1990	Conservative	43	11	6	-	-	-
1994	Conservative	32	7	21	-	-	-
1998	No overall control	28	7	25	-	-	-
2002	Conservative	41	6	13	-	-	-
2006	Conservative	49	4	7	-	-	-
2010	Conservative	53	3	4	-	-	-
2014	Conservative	51	7	-	2	-	-
2018	Conservative	50	8	-	-	-	2
2022	Conservative	36	12	5	-	-	5
2026	Conservative	35	8	6	-	6	3

== Council elections ==
- 1964 Bromley London Borough Council election
- 1968 Bromley London Borough Council election
- 1971 Bromley London Borough Council election (boundary changes took place but the number of seats remained the same) (Note: The Greater London, Kent and Surrey Order, 1968)
- 1974 Bromley London Borough Council election
- 1978 Bromley London Borough Council election (boundary changes took place but the number of seats remained the same)
- 1982 Bromley London Borough Council election
- 1986 Bromley London Borough Council election
- 1990 Bromley London Borough Council election
- 1994 Bromley London Borough Council election (boundary changes took place but the number of seats remained the same) (Note: The Bromley and Greenwich (London Borough Boundaries) Order 1993) (Note: The Bromley and Lewisham (London Borough Boundaries) Order 1993) (Note: The Bromley, Croydon, Lambeth, Lewisham and Southwark (London Borough Boundaries) Order 1993) (Note: The Greater London and Surrey (County and London Borough Boundaries) Order 1993) (Note: The Greater London, Kent and Surrey (County Boundaries) Order 1993)
- 1998 Bromley London Borough Council election
- 2002 Bromley London Borough Council election (boundary changes took place but the number of seats remained the same)
- 2006 Bromley London Borough Council election
- 2010 Bromley London Borough Council election
- 2014 Bromley London Borough Council election
- 2018 Bromley London Borough Council election
- 2022 Bromley London Borough Council election (boundary changes took place; seats reduced from 60 to 58)
- 2026 Bromley London Borough Council election

== Borough result maps ==
2002 results map

2006 results map

2010 results map

2014 results map

2018 results map

2022 results map

2026 results map

== By-election results ==
=== 1964-1968 ===
Darwin by-election, 11 May 1967
Party	Candidate	Votes	%
Conservative	Christopher Knox-Johnston	809	49.7
Liberal	Joyce Cater	775	47.6
Labour	Gustav White	43	2.6
Turnout			

=== 1968-1971 ===
Bickley by-election, 27 June 1968
Party	Candidate	Votes	%
Conservative	J. Smith	1,977	
Liberal	W. R. Edwards	250	
Labour	E. Leys	183	
Turnout			22.7

Petts Wood by-election, 27 June 1968
Party	Candidate	Votes	%
Conservative	K. J. Harding	3,165	
Liberal	Keith Lock	2,010	
Labour	J. R. Constable	188	
Turnout			41.3

Shortlands by-election, 27 June 1968
Party	Candidate	Votes	%
Conservative	Bernard Davis	1,130	
Liberal	J. Bratt	150	
Labour	Christopher Gaster	130	
Turnout			17.9

Chelsfield by-election, 29 May 1969
Party	Candidate	Votes	%
Conservative	Jean Tatham	1,634	
Liberal	S. D. Ellingworth	1,579	
Labour	G. Fielding	109	
Turnout			49.9

St Mary Cray by-election, 29 May 1969
Party	Candidate	Votes	%
Liberal	Roy Edey	1,292	
Conservative	S. M. N. Gready	869	
Labour	S. T. Lack	371	
Turnout			49.9

Eden Park by-election, 20 November 1969
Party	Candidate	Votes	%
Conservative	J. E. Swatton	1,185	
Liberal	Ian Phillips	382	
Labour	Christopher Gaster	186	
Turnout			29.0

St Paul's Cray by-election, 5 February 1970
Party	Candidate	Votes	%
Labour	Edgar Smith	1,367	
Conservative	Albert Stayte	665	
Liberal	J. Fudonger	283	
Turnout			20.4

St Paul's Cray by-election, 31 July 1970
Party	Candidate	Votes	%
Labour	D. W. Edwards	1,511	
Conservative	Albert Stayte	507	
Liberal	J. J. Hart	166	
Turnout			17.5

St Mary Cray by-election, 3 December 1970
Party	Candidate	Votes	%
Labour	John Spellar	1,180	
Liberal	Michael Edwardes-Evans	988	
Conservative	G. S. Edwards	618	
Turnout			28.2

=== 1971-1974 ===
Penge by-election, 8 July 1971
Party	Candidate	Votes	%
Labour	Arthur Mansfield	1,156	
Conservative	R. C. Carter	504	
Liberal	William Huckin	488	
Turnout			27.6

St Paul's Cray by-election, 22 July 1971
Party	Candidate	Votes	%
Labour	M. L. Wilson	1,809	
Conservative	Albert Stayte	417	
Liberal	A. M. Parfitt	249	
Turnout			19.0

Bickley by-election, 11 November 1971
Party	Candidate	Votes	%
Conservative	L. Sellers	1,597	
Labour	J. Wood	535	
Liberal	Paul Nash	188	
Turnout			20.7

Chelsfield by-election, 18 November 1971
Party	Candidate	Votes	%
Conservative	D. E. Johnson	1,400	
Liberal	F. B. Kirby	1,369	
Labour	M. J. E. Healy	220	
Turnout			38.6

St Mary Cray by-election, 18 May 1972
Party	Candidate	Votes	%
Labour	Peter Tozer	2,473	
Conservative	J. A. Collins	1,013	
Liberal	Kathleen Tarbolton	820	
Turnout			38.5

Martins Hill & Town by-election, 24 May 1973
Party	Candidate	Votes	%
Conservative	D. S. Reid	1,020	
Labour	Gordon Yates	799	
Liberal	M. M. Coulson	682	
Turnout			24.2

West Wickham North by-election, 24 May 1973
Party	Candidate	Votes	%
Conservative	P. C. Read	1,052	
Liberal	Peter Dodsworth	956	
Labour	Robert Armstrong	140	
Turnout			28.6

West Wickham South by-election, 24 May 1973
Party	Candidate	Votes	%
Conservative	B. G. Cope	1,218	
Liberal	Jeremy Cope	635	
Labour	John Holbrook	317	
Turnout			27.4

=== 1974-1978 ===
Farnborough by-election, 4 July 1974
Party	Candidate	Votes	%
Conservative	Jennifer Hillier	2,067	
Liberal	Keith Challis	949	
Labour	Philip Edwards	368	
Turnout			27.9

Petts Wood by-election, 4 July 1974
Party	Candidate	Votes	%
Conservative	Alan Cornish	2,272	
Liberal	Edward Babbs	1,555	
Labour	Antoni Ziolkowski	392	
Turnout			36.3

Keston & Hayes by-election, 30 January 1975
Party	Candidate	Votes	%
Conservative	Philip Jones	1,898	
Liberal	Brian Taylor	1,713	
Labour	Peter Rance	377	
Turnout			35.3

Lawrie Park & Kent House by-election, 6 March 1975
Party	Candidate	Votes	%
Conservative	John Lewis	894	
Labour	Janet Ambrose	741	
Liberal	Adrian Chapman	298	
Turnout			31.9

Shortlands by-election, 6 March 1975
Party	Candidate	Votes	%
Conservative	John Stewart	1,830	
Liberal	Ian Phillips	291	
Labour	Jan Pollert	81	
Turnout			26.3

Biggin Hill by-election, 2 October 1975
Party	Candidate	Votes	%
Conservative	Michael Hughes	1,307	
Liberal	George Dunk	596	
Labour	Roy Hodsdon	529	
Turnout			35.0

Darwin by-election, 2 October 1975
Party	Candidate	Votes	%
Conservative	Marion Roe	828	
Liberal	Derek Goldsmith	551	
Labour	Keith Galley	93	
Turnout			52.0

St Paul's Cray by-election, 23 October 1975
Party	Candidate	Votes	%
Labour	Derek Wood	1,886	
Conservative	Albert Stayte	773	
Liberal	Nicholas Rowden	373	
Turnout			24.4

Farnborough by-election, 22 January 1976
Party	Candidate	Votes	%
Conservative	Peter Nash	2,823	
Liberal	Keith Challis	1,804	
Labour	Philip Edwards	392	
Turnout			40.5

West Wickham South by-election, 30 September 1976
Party	Candidate	Votes	%
Conservative	Leslie Whitman	1,664	
Liberal	Alan Sewell	538	
Labour	Richard Cox	303	
Turnout			31.8

Shortlands by-election, 24 March 1977
Party	Candidate	Votes	%
Conservative	Brian Reading	2,462	
Liberal	Phillip Khan-Panni	292	
Labour	Pauline Jones	212	
Turnout			34.7

=== 1978-1982 ===
Bickley 26 July 1979
Party	Candidate	Votes	%
Conservative	Margaret Moir	1,695	62.6
Liberal	Peter Hardie-Bick	423	15.6
Labour	George Bulline	305	11.3
Ecology	Peter Greenwood	286	10.6
Majority		1,272	47.0
Turnout		2,709	24.9
Conservative hold			

The by-election was called following the resignation of Cllr Hector McDonald

Crofton 4 October 1979
Party	Candidate	Votes	%
Conservative	Richard Inniss	1,376	53.9
Liberal	Sandra Ward	872	34.2
Labour	Hilary Powell	196	7.7
Ecology	Peter Greenwood	107	4.2
Majority		504	19.7
Turnout		2,551	31.5
Conservative hold			

The by-election was called following the resignation of Cllr Keith Grieve

Petts Wood & Knoll 19 June 1980
Party	Candidate	Votes	%
Independent	Peter Woods	2,155	41.52
Conservative	Stewart Hopcraft	1,425	27.46
Liberal	Byrom Lees	1,163	22.41
Labour	Rosalie Huzzard	349	6.72
Ecology	John Taylor	98	1.89
Majority		730	14.06
Turnout		5,190	42.95
Independent gain from Conservative			

The by-election was called following the resignation of Cllr Alan Cornish

Petts Wood & Knoll 30 October 1980
Party	Candidate	Votes	%
Independent	Maureen Huntley	2,442	55.49
Conservative	Stewart Hopcraft	1,199	27.24
Liberal	Byrom Lees	553	12.57
Labour	Rosalie Huzzard	207	4.70
Registered electors		12,163	
Majority		1,243	28.25
Turnout		4,401	36.18
Independent gain from Conservative			

The by-election was called following the death of Cllr Don Adams

=== 1982-1986 ===
Bromley Common & Keston, 11 August 1983
Party	Candidate	Votes	%
Liberal	Robert Smith	1,738	50.5
Conservative	Robert Straker	1,324	38.5
Labour	Mark Cole	377	11.0
Majority		414	12.0
Turnout		3,439	26.4
Liberal gain from Conservative			

The by-election was called following the death of Cllr Colin English

Copers Cope, 12 April 1984
Party	Candidate	Votes	%
Conservative	Christopher Elgar	1,410	63.5
SDP	Phyllis Vickers	509	22.9
Labour	Eric Turner	255	11.5
BNP	Andrew Shotton	47	2.1
Majority		901	40.6
Turnout		2,221	35.0
Conservative hold			

The by-election was called following the resignation of Cllr John Pritchard

Bickley, 21 March 1985
Party	Candidate	Votes	%
Liberal	Ervin Muller	1,773	49.0
Conservative	John Sibley	1,602	44.3
Labour	Doris Partridge	243	6.7
Majority		171	4.7
Turnout		3,618	33.6
Liberal gain from Conservative			

The by-election was called following the resignation of Cllr Maurice Kenward

Chislehurst, 28 March 1985
Party	Candidate	Votes	%
Conservative	Joan Wykes	2,225	53.22
SDP	Muriel Letman	1,418	33.92
Labour	Sheila Donn	491	11.74
BNP	Alfred Waite	47	1.12
Majority		807	19.30
Registered electors		12,744	
Turnout		4,181	32.81
Conservative hold			

The by-election was called following the resignation of Cllr Edward Rayner

=== 1986-1990 ===
Chelsfield & Goddington, 7 May 1987
Party	Candidate	Votes	%
Conservative	Bruce Panes	3,570	52.78
Liberal	Margaret Howell	2,736	40.45
Labour	Trevor Phillips	458	6.77
Majority		834	12.33
Registered electors		12,192	
Turnout		6,764	55.48
Conservative hold			

The by-election was called following the resignation of Cllr Joseph Heath

Bromley Common & Keston, 14 April 1988
Party	Candidate	Votes	%
Liberal Democrats	Paul Booth	2,100	50.34
Conservative	Catherine Bustard	1,688	40.46
Labour	Peter Warner	384	9.20
Majority		412	9.88
Registered electors		12,884	
Turnout		4,172	32.4
Liberal Democrats hold			

The by-election was called following the resignation of Cllr Robert Smith

Penge, 21 April 1988
Party	Candidate	Votes	%
Labour	Patricia Mansfield	1,258	54.08
Conservative	Celia Manson	549	23.60
Liberal Democrats	Richard Boultbee	519	22.31
Majority		709	30.5
Registered electors		7,383	
Turnout			31.56
Labour hold			

The by-election was called following the death of Cllr Arthur Mansfield

St Paul's Cray, 21 April 1988
Party	Candidate	Votes	%
Labour	Corinna Smart	1,848	51.2
Liberal Democrats	Thomas Hawthorne	805	22.3
Conservative	Bernard Cobley	780	21.6
SDP	Terence Simpson	174	4.8
Majority		1,043	28.9
Turnout		3,607	29.6
Labour hold			

The by-election was called following the resignation of Cllr Ira Walters

Petts Wood & Knoll, 6 April 1989
Party	Candidate	Votes	%
Conservative	Anthony Owen	2,368	52.6
Liberal Democrats	Harry Silvester	1,325	29.4
Labour	Susan Polydorou	450	10.0
SDP	Christopher Taylor	361	8.0
Majority		1,043	23.2
Turnout		4,504	37.5
Conservative hold			

The by-election was called following the resignation of Cllr Michael Edwards

=== 1990-1994 ===
West Wickham North by-election, 26 March 1992
Party	Candidate	Votes	%
Conservative	Caroline Hubbard	1,810	56.7
Liberal Democrats	Jennifer Fitch	1,156	36.2
Labour	Susan O'Dwyer	154	4.8
SDP	Richard Cox	48	1.5
Liberal	Carmel Martin	23	0.7
Majority		654	20.5
Turnout			45.3
Conservative hold			

The by-election was called following the resignation of Cllr Montague Blazey.

Chelsfield & Goddington by-election, 13 May 1993
Party	Candidate	Votes	%
Liberal Democrats	Graem Peters	3,931	69.2
Conservative	Anthony Youd	1,291	22.7
Labour	Charles Hailes	370	6.5
Green	Nicola Ellingham	88	1.5
Majority		2,640	46.5
Turnout			48.3
Liberal Democrats gain from Conservative			

The by-election was called following the resignation of Cllr Reginald Adams.

=== 1994-1998 ===
Kelsey Park by-election, 20 October 1994
Party	Candidate	Votes	%
Conservative	Roderick Reed	1,544	
Liberal Democrats	Edward Whitaker	910	
Labour	Deborah Russell	330	
Independent	Colin Cole	55	
Liberal	George Whitehorn	15	
Turnout			
Conservative hold			

The by-election was called following the resignation of Cllr Stephen Oxenbridge.

Bickley by-election, 18 April 1996
Party	Candidate	Votes	%
Conservative	Gordon Jenkins	2,263	
Liberal Democrats	David Dear	1,929	
Labour	Kelly Galvin	549	
Liberal	Ian Richmond	80	
Turnout			
Conservative hold			

The by-election was called following the resignation of Cllr David Dear.

=== 1998-2002 ===
Bickley by-election, 29 October 1998
Party	Candidate	Votes	%	±%
Conservative	John Gallop	1,828	57.4	−2.0
Liberal Democrats	Derek Gambell	1,110	34.9	+10.6
Labour	Alfred Parish	181	5.7	−10.6
National Front	Kevin Lowne	40	1.3	+1.3
Liberal	Elizabeth Steele	25	0.8	+0.8
Majority		718	22.5	
Turnout		3,184	30.2	
Conservative hold		Swing		

The by-election was called following the death of Cllr Sheila Humphreys.

Bromley Common & Keston by-election, 1 July 1999
Party	Candidate	Votes	%	±%
Conservative	Stephen Carr	1,754	46.6	
Liberal Democrats	Lennard Woods	1,683	44.7	
Labour	George Johnstone	195	5.2	
Independent	Gary Badgett	81	2.2	
Green	Adrian Appley	49	1.3	
Majority		71	1.9	
Turnout		3,762	31.1	
Conservative gain from Liberal Democrats		Swing		

The by-election was called following the resignation of Cllr Paul Booth.

Farnborough by-election, 24 February 2000
Party	Candidate	Votes	%	±%
Conservative	Timothy Stevens	1,460	51.9	−8.6
Liberal Democrats	Robert Evans	1,195	42.4	+22.5
Labour	Christopher Price	81	2.9	−7.5
UKIP	Robert Bryant	43	1.5	−7.8
Green	Ann Garrett	37	1.3	+1.3
Majority		265	9.5	
Turnout		2,816	39.5	
Conservative hold		Swing		

The by-election was called following the death of Cllr Eric Goodman.

Chelsfield and Goddington by-election, 5 July 2001
Party	Candidate	Votes	%	±%
Conservative	Julian Grainger	2,480	52.9	+10.8
Liberal Democrats	Michael Oldman	2,122	45.2	−3.3
Labour	Peter Lisle	88	1.9	−7.5
Majority		358	7.7	
Turnout		4,690	40.1	
Conservative gain from Liberal Democrats		Swing		

The by-election was called following the resignation of Cllr Graem Peters.

Mottingham by-election, 5 July 2001
Party	Candidate	Votes	%	±%
Conservative	Charles Rideout	746	49.2	+11.9
Labour	Elizabeth Johnstone	689	45.5	−4.8
Liberal Democrats	Derek Gambell	80	5.3	−7.1
Majority		57	3.7	
Turnout		1,515	24.6	
Conservative gain from Labour		Swing		

The by-election was called following the resignation of Cllr Robert Yeldham.

=== 2002-2006 ===
There were no by-elections.

=== 2006-2010 ===
Crystal Palace by-election, 6 September 2007
Party	Candidate	Votes	%	±%
Liberal Democrats	Tom Papworth	1,051	49.7	+2.5
Labour	Kevin C. Brooks	537	25.4	+1.5
Conservative	Jason M. Hadden	398	18.8	+3.5
Green	Karen A. Moran	129	6.1	−7.5
Majority		514	24.3	
Turnout		2,115	24.7	
Liberal Democrats hold		Swing		

The by-election was called following the death of Cllr Christopher Gaster.

=== 2010-2014 ===
Shortlands by-election, 20 October 2011
Party	Candidate	Votes	%	±%
Conservative	David Jefferys	1,480	59.4	+2.9
Liberal Democrats	Anuja Prashar	490	19.6	−8.1
Labour	Gareth Davies	256	10.2	−2.6
UKIP	Emmett Jenner	153	6.1	+6.1
Green	Anna Martin	75	3.0	+3.0
BNP	Michael Payne	35	1.4	−5.8
Majority		990	39.8	
Turnout		2,489		
Conservative hold		Swing		

The by-election was called following the resignation of Cllr George Taylor.

Bromley Town by-election, 3 May 2012
Party	Candidate	Votes	%	±%
Conservative	Nicky Dykes	2,484	45.4	+3.9
Liberal Democrats	Sam Webber	1,137	20.8	−1.6
Labour	Angela Stack	1,051	19.2	−0.7
Green	Ann Garrett	404	7.4	−2.1
UKIP	Owen Brolly	397	7.3	+0.6
Majority		1,347	24.6	
Turnout		5,473		
Conservative hold		Swing		

The by-election was called following the resignation of Cllr Diana MacMull.

=== 2014-2018 ===
There were no by-elections from 2014 to 2018.

=== 2018-2022 ===
Kelsey and Eden Park by-election, 29 November 2018
Party	Candidate	Votes	%	±%
Conservative	Christine Harris	1626	45.2	+0.8
Labour	Marie Bardsley	1046	29.1	+1.7
Liberal Democrats	Julie Ireland	633	17.6	+2.7
UKIP	Graham Reakes	219	6.1	+2.4
Green	Paul Enock	73	2.0	−7.6
Turnout		3597	29.17	
Conservative hold		Swing		

The by-election was called following the resignation of Cllr Dave Wibberley.

Crystal Palace by-election, 6 May 2021
Party	Candidate	Votes	%	±%
Labour	Ryan Thomson	2,235	53.1	−3.8
Green	Maria Psaras	820	19.5	+3.2
Conservative	Tom Capon	783	18.6	+5.9
Liberal Democrats	Suraj Gandecha	370	8.8	−6.3
Turnout		4,208		
Labour hold		Swing		

The by-election was called following the resignation of Cllr Marina Ahmad.

=== 2022-2026 ===
Hayes and Coney Hall by-election, 7 December 2023
Party	Candidate	Votes	%	±%
Conservative	Josh Coldspring-White	1,541	48.0	+5.3
Labour	Susan Moore	962	30.0	+3.8
Liberal Democrats	Tudor Griffiths	526	16.4	+1.9
Green	Sarah Chant	183	5.7	−10.9
Majority		579	18.0	
Turnout		3,212		
Conservative hold		Swing		

The by-election was called following the death of Cllr Andrew Lee.

Shortlands and Park Langley by-election, 2 May 2024
Party	Candidate	Votes	%	±%
Conservative	Gemma Turrell	2,835	42.4	−2.5
Labour	Charlotte Grievson	2,005	30.0	−0.6
Liberal Democrats	Gita Bapat	836	12.5	−8.9
Reform	Edward Apostolides	417	6.2	+3.1
Green	Louis Goddard-Glen	374	5.6	+5.6
Independent	Brendan Donegan	219	3.3	+3.3
Majority		830	12.4	
Turnout		6,686		
Conservative hold		Swing		

The by-election was called following the resignation of Cllr Aisha Cuthbert.

Bromley Common and Holwood by-election, 24 July 2025
Party	Candidate	Votes	%	±%
Reform	Alan Cook	1,342	34.0	
Conservative	Ian Payne	1,161	29.4	
Labour	Elizabeth Morgan	720	18.2	
Liberal Democrats	Laura McCracken	540	13.7	
Green	Ruth Fabricant	185	4.7	
Majority		181	4.6	
Turnout		3,948	28%	
Reform gain from Conservative				

The by-election was called following the death of Conservative councillor Jonathan Laidlaw.
