= Petts Wood and Knoll =

Electoral ward in London, England

- Electoral ward for the Bromley London Borough Council
- Petts Wood and Knoll ward boundaries since 2022
- Borough: Bromley
- County: Greater London
- Population: 17,259 (2021)
- Electorate: 12,828 (2022)
- Major settlements: Petts Wood
- Area: 4.999 square kilometres (1.930 sq mi)

Current electoral ward
- Created: 1978
- Number of members: 3
- Councillors: Tony Owen; Simon Fawthrop; Vacancy
- ONS code: 00AFGY (2002–2022)
- GSS code: E05000124 (2002–2022); E05014003 (2022–present)

Petts Wood and Knoll is an electoral ward in the London Borough of Bromley. The ward was first used in the 1978 elections and elects three councillors to Bromley London Borough Council.

== List of councillors ==
Seat	Councillor	Took office	Left office	Party	Election
1	Alan Cornish	1978	1980	Conservative	1978
2	Joan Hatcher	1978	1998	Conservative	1978, 1982, 1986, 1990, 1994
3	Don Adams	1978	1980	Conservative	1978
1	Peter Woods	1980	1982	Ind. Residents	1980
3	Maureen Huntley	1980	1982	Ind. Residents	1980
1	Micheal Edwards	1982	1989	Conservative	1982, 1986
3	Brian Atkison	1982	1990	Conservative	1982, 1986
1	Tony Owen	1989	1998	Conservative	1989, 1990, 1994
3	Peter Woods	1990	2006	Conservative	1990, 1994, 1998, 2002
2	Tara Bowman	1998	2002	Conservative	1998
1	John Ince	1998	2006	Conservative	1998, 2002
2	Tony Owen	2002	Incumbent	Conservative	2002, 2006, 2010, 2014, 2018, 2022
3	Douglas Auld	2006	2018	Conservative	2006, 2010, 2014
1	Simon Fawthrop	2006	Incumbent	Conservative	2006, 2010, 2014, 2018, 2022
3	Keith Onslow	2018	2025	Conservative	2018, 2022

== Bromley council elections since 2022 ==
There was a revision of ward boundaries in Bromley in 2022.

=== 2026 election ===
Keith Onslow died in December 2025, with the by-election deferred until May 2026. (Note: Casual vacancies occurring within six months of scheduled elections are not filled.)

=== 2022 election ===
The election took place on 5 May 2022.

2022 Bromley London Borough Council election: Petts Wood and Knoll
Party	Candidate	Votes	%	±%
Conservative	Keith Onslow	2,992	54.8	
Conservative	Tony Owen	2,905	53.2	
Conservative	Simon Fawthrop	2,880	52.8	
Liberal Democrats	Ian Catchpole	1,437	26.3	
Liberal Democrats	Oliver Loosemore	1,293	23.7	
Labour	John Pead	1,170	21.4	
Liberal Democrats	Andy Stotesbury	1,133	20.8	
Labour	Charlotte Grievson	1,124	20.6	
Labour	Gareth Wretham	915	16.8	
Turnout		5,457	43	
Registered electors		12,828		
Conservative win (new boundaries)				
Conservative win (new boundaries)				
Conservative win (new boundaries)				

== 2002–2022 Bromley council elections ==
Petts Wood and Knoll ward boundaries from 2002 to 2022

There was a revision of ward boundaries in Bromley in 2002.

=== 2018 election ===
The election took place on 3 May 2018.

2018 Bromley London Borough Council election: Petts Wood and Knoll
Party	Candidate	Votes	%	±%
Conservative	Keith Onslow	3,426	69.3	
Conservative	Tony Owen	3,299	66.7	
Conservative	Simon Fawthrop	3,104	62.8	
Liberal Democrats	Lesley Astier	863	17.4	
Labour	Benjamin Devlin	744	15.0	
Labour	Jemma Gallagher	694	14.0	
Green	Martin Childs	626	12.7	
Labour	Stephen Cranenburgh	565	11.4	
Liberal Democrats	John Loosemore	544	11.0	
Liberal Democrats	Michael Berridge	471	9.5	
Turnout		14,336	47	
Registered electors		10,646		
Conservative hold		Swing		
Conservative hold		Swing		
Conservative hold		Swing		

=== 2014 election ===
The election took place on 22 May 2014.

=== 2010 election ===
The election on 6 May 2010 took place on the same day as the United Kingdom general election.

=== 2006 election ===
The election took place on 4 May 2006.

=== 2002 election ===
The election took place on 2 May 2002.

== 1978–2002 Bromley council elections ==
=== 1998 election ===
The election on 7 May 1998 took place on the same day as the 1998 Greater London Authority referendum.

=== 1994 election ===
The election took place on 5 May 1994.

=== 1990 election ===
The election took place on 3 May 1990.

=== 1989 by-election ===
The by-election took place on 6 April 1989, following the resignation of Michael Edwards.

1989 Petts Wood and Knoll by-election
Party	Candidate	Votes	%	±%
Conservative	Tony Owen	2,368		
Liberal Democrats	Harry Silvester	1,325		
Labour	Susan Polydorou	450		
SDP	Chrislopher Taylor	361		
Turnout			37.53	
Conservative hold		Swing		

=== 1986 election ===
The election took place on 8 May 1986.

=== 1982 election ===
The election took place on 6 May 1982.

1982 Bromley London Borough Council election: Petts Wood and Knoll
Party	Candidate	Votes	%	±%
Conservative	Joan Hatcher	3,612		
Conservative	Michael Edwards	3,496		
Conservative	Brian Atkinson	3,261		
Ind. Conservative	Peter Woods	2,374		
Alliance (SDP)	Beatrice Hedley	1,507		
Alliance (Liberal)	Graham Arthur	1,458		
Alliance (Liberal)	Irene Hinchcliffe	1,400		
Labour	Jeffrey Bartley	323		
Labour	Marcus Shellard	306		
Labour	Peter Tozer	305		
Majority				
Conservative hold		Swing		
Conservative gain from Ind. Residents		Swing		
Conservative gain from Ind. Residents		Swing		

=== October 1980 by-election ===
The by-election took place on 30 October 1980, following the death of Don Adams.

October 1980 Petts Wood and Knoll by-election
Party	Candidate	Votes	%	±%
Ind. Residents	Maureen Huntley	2,442		
Conservative	Stewart Hopcraft	1,199		
Liberal	Byrom Lees	553		
Labour	Rosalie Huzzard	207		
Turnout			36.2	
Ind. Residents gain from Conservative		Swing		

=== June 1980 by-election ===
The by-election took place on 19 June 1980, following the resignation of Alan Cornish.

June 1980 Petts Wood and Knoll by-election
Party	Candidate	Votes	%	±%
Ind. Residents	Peter Woods	2,155		
Conservative	Stewart Hopcraft	1,425		
Liberal	Byrom Lees	1,163		
Labour	Rosalie Huzzard	349		
Ecology	John Taylor	98		
Turnout			43	
Ind. Residents gain from Conservative		Swing		

=== 1978 election ===
The election took place on 4 May 1978.

1978 Bromley London Borough Council election: Petts Wood and Knoll
Party	Candidate	Votes	%	±%
Conservative	Alan Cornish	4,447		
Conservative	Joan Hatcher	4,382		
Conservative	Don Adams	4,290		
Liberal	David Clark	1,373		
Liberal	Christopher Wilson	1,283		
Liberal	Robert Street	1,229		
Labour	Keith Good	659		
Labour	Ann Grant	581		
Labour	Maria Sawczenko	513		
Turnout				
Conservative win (new seat)				
Conservative win (new seat)				
Conservative win (new seat)				
