= 2006 Bromley London Borough Council election =

Local election in England

2006 Bromley Council election
← 2002	4 May 2006	2010 →

All 60 seats to Bromley London Borough Council 31 seats needed for a majority
	First party	Second party	Third party
Party	Conservative	Liberal Democrats	Labour
Seats won	49	7	4
Seat change	▲8	▼6	▼2
Popular vote	53,247	25,196	12,104
Percentage	54.1%	25.6%	12.3%
Swing	▲3.6%	▼7.0%	▼1.8%
- Map of the results of the 2006 Bromley council election. Conservatives in blue, Labour in red and Liberal Democrats in yellow.
Council control before election
Conservative
Council control after election
Conservative

Elections to Bromley Council were held on 4 May 2006. The whole council was up for election and the council was held by the Conservatives, with their net gains putting them in their best state for over twenty years.

After the election, the composition of the council was

- Conservative 49
- Liberal Democrat 7
- Labour 4

== Election result ==
Bromley local election result 2006
Party	Seats	Gains	Losses	Net gain/loss	Seats %	Votes %	Votes	+/−
Conservative	49	8	0	▲8	81.7	54.1	53,247	▲3.6
Liberal Democrats	7	0	6	▼6	11.7	25.6	25,196	▼7.0
Labour	4	0	2	▼2	6.7	12.3	12,104	▼1.8
Green	0	0	0	Steady	0	3.6	3,562	▲2.4
Independent	0	0	0	Steady	0	2.7	2,700	New
BNP	0	0	0	Steady	0	1.3	1,269	New
UKIP	0	0	0	Steady	0	0.4	396	▼0.6

== Ward results ==
=== Bickley ===
Bickley (3)
Party	Candidate	Votes	%	±%
Conservative	Colin Bloom	3,277	72.2	
Conservative	Gordon Jenkins	3,242		
Conservative	Catherine Rideout	3,228		
Liberal Democrats	Martin Milliner	791	17.4	
Liberal Democrats	Brian Taylor	789		
Liberal Democrats	Philippa Coyte-Woods	737		
Labour	Christopher Clough	473	10.4	
Labour	Velma Campbell	444		
Labour	Arthur Johnson	418		
Turnout			42.9	
Conservative hold		Swing		
Conservative hold		Swing		
Conservative hold		Swing		

=== Biggin Hill ===
Biggin Hill (2)
Party	Candidate	Votes	%	±%
Conservative	Gordon Norrie	1,708	51.9	
Conservative	Julian Benington	1,651		
Liberal Democrats	Geoffrey Gostt	1,476	44.8	
Liberal Democrats	Bob Shekyls	1,426		
Labour	Patrick Collins	107	3.3	
Labour	Christopher Price	107		
Turnout			43.2	
Conservative gain from Liberal Democrats		Swing		
Conservative gain from Liberal Democrats		Swing		

=== Bromley Common and Keston ===
Bromley Common and Keston (3)
Party	Candidate	Votes	%	±%
Conservative	Stephen Carr	3,012	66.1	
Conservative	Ruth Bennett	2,948		
Conservative	Alexa Michael	2,939		
Liberal Democrats	Sheila Blackburn	705	15.5	
Liberal Democrats	Alan Carter	704		
Liberal Democrats	Mark Gill	588		
Green	Adrian Appley	466	10.2	
Labour	Tom Ellis	374	8.2	
Labour	Ewan Buck	371		
Labour	Kelly Galvin	365		
Turnout			40.2	
Conservative hold		Swing		
Conservative hold		Swing		
Conservative hold		Swing		

=== Bromley Town ===
Bromley Town (3)
Party	Candidate	Votes	%	±%
Conservative	Stephen Maly	2,190	46.7	
Conservative	David Hastings	2,157		
Conservative	Christopher Phillips	2,083		
Liberal Democrats	Peter Brooks	1,570	33.5	
Liberal Democrats	David Dear	1,429		
Liberal Democrats	Timothy Sowter	1,372		
Green	Simon Anstey	478	10.2	
Labour	Robert Armstrong	447	9.5	
Green	Alison Scammell	438		
Green	Jacob Gordon	431		
Labour	Michael Gibson	406		
Labour	Richard Comaish	376		
Turnout			39.0	
Conservative hold		Swing		
Conservative hold		Swing		
Conservative hold		Swing		

=== Chelsfield and Pratts Bottom ===
Chelsfield and Pratts Bottom (3)
Party	Candidate	Votes	%	±%
Conservative	Julian Grainger	3,008	52.2	
Conservative	Robert Evans	2,990		
Conservative	Samaris Huntington-Thresher	2,884		
Liberal Democrats	Duncan Borrowman	2,003	34.7	
Liberal Democrats	Grace Goodlad	1,951		
Liberal Democrats	Michael Hall	1,856		
Green	Ann Garrett	480	8.3	
Labour	Gillian Collins	274	4.8	
Labour	John Waterworth	242		
Labour	Christopher Purnell	242		
Turnout			49.0	
Conservative hold		Swing		
Conservative hold		Swing		
Conservative hold		Swing		

=== Chislehurst ===
Chislehurst (3)
Party	Candidate	Votes	%	±%
Conservative	Kathleen Boughey	2,986	54.0	
Conservative	Eric Bosshard	2,910		
Conservative	Brian Toms	2,709		
Independent	John Hemming-Clark	903	16.3	
Liberal Democrats	Ian Magrath	651	11.8	
Liberal Democrats	Sam Webber	557		
Green	Frances Speed	532	9.6	
Liberal Democrats	Rosemary Oliver	515		
Labour	Stuart Reid	457	8.3	
Labour	Christian Mole	425		
Labour	Gareth Wretham	307		
Turnout			40.6	
Conservative hold		Swing		
Conservative hold		Swing		
Conservative hold		Swing		

=== Clock House ===
Clock House (3)
Party	Candidate	Votes	%	±%
Liberal Democrats	Reginald Adams	1,707	33.4	
Conservative	Sarah Phillips	1,667	32.6	
Liberal Democrats	Benjamin Abbotts	1,663		
Conservative	Nicholas Milner	1,586		
Liberal Democrats	Johanna Christie-Smith	1,478		
Conservative	Dorothy Laird	1,454		
Labour	Janet Ambrose	925	18.1	
Labour	Kevin Brooks	826		
Green	Margaret Toomey	815	15.9	
Labour	Joshua King	793		
Turnout			40.4	
Liberal Democrats hold		Swing		
Conservative gain from Liberal Democrats		Swing		
Liberal Democrats hold		Swing		

=== Copers Cope ===
Copers Cope (3)
Party	Candidate	Votes	%	±%
Conservative	Michael Tickner	2,904	67.3	
Conservative	Stephen Wells	2,895		
Conservative	Russell Mellor	2,848		
Liberal Democrats	Kay Stocker	851	19.7	
Liberal Democrats	Julian Critchley	837		
Liberal Democrats	Paul Nash	824		
Labour	Kathleen Lucey	563	13.0	
Labour	Belinda Price	558		
Labour	John Dempster	541		
Turnout			38.8	
Conservative hold		Swing		
Conservative hold		Swing		
Conservative hold		Swing		

=== Cray Valley East ===
Cray Valley East (3)
Party	Candidate	Votes	%	±%
Liberal Democrats	David McBride	1,595	46.8	
Liberal Democrats	Martin Curry	1,542		
Liberal Democrats	Brenda Thompson	1,522		
Conservative	Damian Crawford	1,297	38.0	
Conservative	John Ince	1,252		
Conservative	Jengiz Ali	1,102		
Labour	John Wright	518	15.2	
Labour	Gary Hayes	498		
Labour	James Flack	491		
Turnout			32.5	
Liberal Democrats hold		Swing		
Liberal Democrats hold		Swing		
Liberal Democrats hold		Swing		

=== Cray Valley West ===
Cray Valley West (3)
Party	Candidate	Votes	%	±%
Labour	Colin Willetts	1,299	26.6	
Conservative	Judith Ellis	1,298	26.5	
Conservative	Harry Stranger	1,174		
Labour	Susan Gibbens	1,106		
Labour	John Holbrook	1,085		
Liberal Democrats	Michael Bignell	1,083	22.1	
Conservative	Lalit Khanna	1,000		
Liberal Democrats	Harold Barker	993		
Liberal Democrats	Mark Moran	930		
BNP	Ian Moore	853	17.4	
UKIP	Thomas Foley	358	7.3	
Turnout			35.9	
Labour hold		Swing		
Conservative gain from Labour		Swing		
Conservative gain from Labour		Swing		

=== Crystal Palace ===
Crystal Palace (2)
Party	Candidate	Votes	%	±%
Liberal Democrats	Christopher Gaster	1,345	47.2	
Liberal Democrats	John Canvin	1,255		
Labour	Claire Francis	680	23.9	
Labour	Richard Williams	674		
Conservative	Nicholas Fordham	435	15.3	
Green	Karen Moran	388	13.6	
Conservative	Michael Kingsford	388		
Turnout			33.2	
Liberal Democrats hold		Swing		
Liberal Democrats hold		Swing		

=== Darwin ===
Darwin
Party	Candidate	Votes	%	±%
Conservative	Peter Bloomfield	1,327	77.4	
Liberal Democrats	Caroline De Vivo	294	17.1	
Labour	John Lewis	94	5.5	
Turnout			46.7	
Conservative hold		Swing		

=== Farnborough and Crofton ===
Farnborough and Crofton (3)
Party	Candidate	Votes	%	±%
Conservative	Jennifer Hillier	3,591	63.2	
Conservative	Charles Joel	3,414		
Conservative	Timothy Stevens	3,245		
Liberal Democrats	Barbara Moran	1,038	18.3	
Liberal Democrats	Vivian Ross	1,017		
Liberal Democrats	Leo Staggs	875		
Independent	Kathryn Taylor	743	13.1	
Labour	Malcolm Barker	276	4.9	
Labour	Bryan Gay	259		
Labour	Harvey Guntrip	219		
UKIP	Ken Tracey	38	0.7	
Turnout			48.1	
Conservative hold		Swing		
Conservative hold		Swing		
Conservative hold		Swing		

=== Hayes and Coney Hall ===
Hayes and Coney Hall (3)
Party	Candidate	Votes	%	±%
Conservative	Thelma Manning	3,799	72.6	
Conservative	Graham Arthur	3,586		
Conservative	Neil Reddin	3,423		
Liberal Democrats	Mary Morgan	862	16.5	
Liberal Democrats	Tudor Griffiths	856		
Liberal Democrats	Steven Daniell	793		
Labour	David Cordell	569	10.9	
Labour	Katharine Head	511		
Labour	Laura Padoan	488		
Turnout			43.2	
Conservative hold		Swing		
Conservative hold		Swing		
Conservative hold		Swing		

=== Kelsey and Eden Park ===
Kelsey and Eden Park (3)
Party	Candidate	Votes	%	±%
Conservative	Peter Dean	2,678	49.7	
Conservative	Rebekah Gilbert	2,608		
Conservative	Denise Reddin	2,478		
Liberal Democrats	Jeffrey Foulger	1,148	21.3	
Independent	Roderick Reed	1,054	19.6	
Liberal Democrats	Anthony Payton	904		
Liberal Democrats	Michael Caine	903		
Independent	Laurence Wright	850		
Independent	Shabana Benson	767		
Labour	Therese Curran	504	9.4	
Labour	Richard Watts	454		
Labour	Clinton McCree	424		
Turnout			43.6	
Conservative hold		Swing		
Conservative hold		Swing		
Conservative hold		Swing		

=== Mottingham and Chislehurst North ===
Mottingham and Chislehurst North (2)
Party	Candidate	Votes	%	±%
Conservative	Roger Charsley	1,404	49.3	
Conservative	Charles Rideout	1,315		
Labour	Barry Beattie	660	23.2	
Labour	Donovan Lindsay	554		
BNP	Tony Hazell	416	14.6	
Liberal Democrats	John Houghton	365	12.8	
Liberal Democrats	Jane Coyte	357		
Turnout			36.8	
Conservative hold		Swing		
Conservative hold		Swing		

=== Orpington ===
Orpington (3)
Party	Candidate	Votes	%	±%
Conservative	Peter Hobbins	2,749	51.1	
Conservative	William Huntington-Thresher	2,674		
Conservative	Pauline Tunnicliffe	2,627		
Liberal Democrats	Jennifer Powell	2,363	43.9	
Liberal Democrats	Gerda Loosemore-Reppen	2,279		
Liberal Democrats	Helen Rabbatts	2,245		
Labour	Derrick Parker	268	5.0	
Labour	Christopher Taylor	244		
Labour	Jeeva Rangasamy	241		
Turnout			47.1	
Conservative gain from Liberal Democrats		Swing		
Conservative gain from Liberal Democrats		Swing		
Conservative gain from Liberal Democrats		Swing		

=== Penge and Cator ===
Penge and Cator (3)
Party	Candidate	Votes	%	±%
Labour	John Getgood	1,727	37.9	
Labour	Peter Fookes	1,714		
Labour	Karen Roberts	1,695		
Liberal Democrats	Thomas Papworth	1,525	33.5	
Liberal Democrats	Emma Price	1,512		
Liberal Democrats	Sonia Whitaker	1,455		
Conservative	Paul Harding	1,305	28.6	
Conservative	Hamid Mughal	1,100		
Conservative	Ismail Gulaid	1,099		
Turnout			39.5	
Labour hold		Swing		
Labour hold		Swing		
Labour hold		Swing		

=== Petts Wood and Knoll ===
Petts Wood and Knoll (3)
Party	Candidate	Votes	%	±%
Conservative	Anthony Owen	3,757	69.7	
Conservative	Douglas Auld	3,688		
Conservative	Simon Fawthrop	3,474		
Liberal Democrats	Eileen Edwards	1,313	24.3	
Liberal Democrats	Michael Oldman	981		
Liberal Democrats	Dawn Bignell	501		
Labour	Peter Lisle	323	6.0	
Labour	John Parks	255		
Labour	Roy Shufflebotham	252		
Turnout			49.1	
Conservative hold		Swing		
Conservative hold		Swing		
Conservative hold		Swing		

=== Plaistow and Sundridge ===
Plaistow and Sundridge (3)
Party	Candidate	Votes	%	±%
Conservative	Peter Morgan	2,649	54.9	
Conservative	Colin Smith	2,601		
Conservative	Michael Turner	2,543		
Liberal Democrats	Lennard Woods	1,294	26.8	
Liberal Democrats	Michael Deves	1,292		
Liberal Democrats	Toby Philpott	1,258		
Labour	Andrew Barber	481	10.0	
Labour	Peter Saunders	459		
Labour	Julian Richards	420		
Green	Gillian Windall	403	8.3	
Green	John Street	220		
Turnout			42.9	
Conservative hold		Swing		
Conservative hold		Swing		
Conservative hold		Swing		

=== Shortlands ===
Shortlands (2)
Party	Candidate	Votes	%	±%
Conservative	Ernest Noad	2,443	72.9	
Conservative	George Taylor	2,375		
Labour	Richard Hart	493	14.7	
Labour	Glyn Alsworth	490		
Liberal Democrats	Hilary Gaster	417	12.4	
Liberal Democrats	Mary Hurworth	393		
Turnout			45.7	
Conservative hold		Swing		
Conservative hold		Swing		

=== West Wickham ===
West Wickham (3)
Party	Candidate	Votes	%	±%
Conservative	Carole Hubbard	3,763	73.0	
Conservative	Brian Humphreys	3,665		
Conservative	Nicholas Bennett	3,554		
Liberal Democrats	Ivor Lane	800	15.5	
Liberal Democrats	Graham Radford	778		
Liberal Democrats	Shirley Homewood	720		
Labour	Gary Kent	592	11.5	
Labour	Alan Burn	585		
Labour	Michael Simms	554		
Turnout			46.3	
Conservative hold		Swing		
Conservative hold		Swing		
Conservative hold		Swing		
