= 2014 Bromley London Borough Council election =

2014 local election in England

- 22 May 2014

All 60 seats to Bromley London Borough Council 31 seats needed for a majority

	First party	Second party	Third party
Party	Conservative	Labour	UKIP
Last election	53 seats, 49.3%	3 seats, 15.5%	0 seats, 3.7%
Seats won	51	7	2
Seat change	▼2	▲4	▲2
Popular vote	41,988	26,295	22,573
Percentage	39.6%	18.3%	19.8%
Swing	▼9.7%	▲2.8%	▲16.1%
- Map of the results of the 2014 Bromley council election. Conservatives in blue, Labour in red and UKIP in purple.
Council control before election
Conservative
Council control after election
Conservative

The 2014 Bromley London Borough Council election took place on 22 May 2014. All 60 members of Bromley London Borough Council were elected. The elections took place alongside local elections in the other London boroughs, elections to local authorities across the United Kingdom, and elections to the European Parliament.

In the previous election in 2010, the Conservative Party maintained its control of the council, winning 53 out of the 60 seats with the Liberal Democrats forming the primary opposition with 4 seats, a loss of three. The Labour Party lost a seat, and won the remaining 3 seats.

At this election, The Liberal Democrats lost all four of their seats to Labour in the Cray Valley East, Crystal Palace and Clock House wards. UKIP gained two seats from the Conservative Party in Cray Valley West.

== Results summary ==
Bromley local election result 2014
Party	Seats	Gains	Losses	Net gain/loss	Seats %	Votes %	Votes	+/−
Conservative	51	1	3	-2	85.0	39.6	41,988	-9.7
UKIP	2	2	0	2	3.3	19.8	22,573	+16.1
Labour	7	4	0	+4	11.7	18.3	20,886	+2.8
Green	0	0	0	0	0.0	11.6	13,168	+7.6
Liberal Democrats	0	0	4	-4	0.0	9.1	10,337	-15.5
Independent	0	0	0	0	0.0	1.0	1,095	-0.1
BNP	0	0	0	0	0.0	0.5	604	-0.5
TUSC	0	0	0	0	0.0	0.1	131	N/A

== Ward results ==
=== Bickley ===
Bickley (3 seats)
Party	Candidate	Votes	%	±%
Conservative	Catherine Rideout	2,667	54.6	−4.6
Conservative	Kate Lymer	2,628	53.8	−5.6
Conservative	Colin Smith	2,625	53.7	−0.7
UKIP	David Woods	889	18.2	+10.9
UKIP	John Francis	842	17.2	N/A
UKIP	David Quartermain	825	16.9	N/A
Labour	Kelly Galvin	667	13.6	+2.7
Labour	Christopher Clough	646	13.2	+2.5
Labour	Robert Evans	631	12.9	+2.0
Green	Roisin Robertson	457	9.3	+2.1
Liberal Democrats	Charles Barr	370	7.6	−12.0
Liberal Democrats	Victoria Wye	339	6.9	−11.2
Liberal Democrats	Jonathan Webber	309	6.3	−9.2
Turnout		4,889	41.80	
Conservative hold		Swing		
Conservative hold		Swing		
Conservative hold		Swing		

=== Biggin Hill ===
Biggin Hill (2 seats)
Party	Candidate	Votes	%	±%
Conservative	Julian Bennington	1,652	51.0	+3.1
Conservative	Melanie Stevens	1,282	39.6	−11.4
UKIP	Emmett Jenner	1,185	36.6	+28.3
Liberal Democrats	Geoffrey Gostt	501	15.5	−16.1
Liberal Democrats	Walter Shekyls	428	13.2	−14.5
Labour	Colin Savage	314	9.7	+3.5
Green	Lara Yates	300	9.3	N/A
Labour	Michael Roberts	103	3.2	−3.0
Turnout		3,241	41.42	
Conservative hold		Swing		
Conservative hold		Swing		

=== Bromley Common and Keston ===
Bromley Common and Keston (3 seats)
Party	Candidate	Votes	%	±%
Conservative	Stephen Carr	2,368	49.0	−4.0
Conservative	Alexa Michael	2,350	48.6	−4.6
Conservative	Ruth Bennett	2,288	47.4	−5.6
UKIP	John Bailey	1279	26.5	+16.5
UKIP	Robert Todd	1150	23.8	N/A
Labour	Ufuoma Simon	848	17.6	+4.4
Labour	Gareth Abbit	836	17.3	+5.1
Green	Pamela Remon	720	14.9	N/A
Labour	Peter Williams	663	13.7	+3.6
Liberal Democrats	Sheila Blackburn	350	7.2	−14.1
Liberal Democrats	Dawn Berry	275	5.7	−13.6
Turnout		4,831	39.90	
Conservative hold		Swing		
Conservative hold		Swing		
Conservative hold		Swing		

=== Bromley Town ===
Bromley Town (3 seats)
Party	Candidate	Votes	%	±%
Conservative	Nicola Dykes	2,099	43.4	−1.3
Conservative	William Harmer	1,993	41.4	−3.7
Conservative	Michael Rutherford	1,867	38.8	−0.9
Labour	Marcus Oliver	1,126	23.4	+1.8
Labour	Richard Cormaish	1,083	22.5	+2.6
Labour	Rubina Sutton	934	19.4	+1.4
UKIP	Derek Bryan	823	17.1	+9.9
UKIP	Peter Thompson	803	16.7	N/A
Green	Mary Ion	716	14.9	+4.5
UKIP	Anthony Van Der Elst	677	14.1	N/A
Liberal Democrats	Colin England	558	11.6	−8.7
Liberal Democrats	Michael Berridge	541	11.2	−9.5
Liberal Democrats	Martin Cooper	515	10.7	−11.7
Turnout		4,818	37.48	
Conservative hold		Swing		
Conservative hold		Swing		
Conservative hold		Swing		

=== Chelsfield and Pratts Bottom ===
Chelsfield and Pratts Bottom (3 seats)
Party	Candidate	Votes	%	±%
Conservative	Lydia Buttinger	2,482	46.2	−11.5
Conservative	Samaris Huntington-Thresher	2,382	44.3	−8.6
Conservative	Keith Onslow	2,312	43.0	−9.3
UKIP	Julian Grainger	1,727	32.1	−25.6
UKIP	Patrick Greenidge	1,559	29.0	N/A
UKIP	Daniel Slade	1,408	26.2	N/A
Labour	Stephen Richardson	631	11.7	+2.5
Green	Daniel Sloan	582	10.8	N/A
Labour	Jeremy Adams	552	10.3	+1.6
Liberal Democrats	Gerda Loosemore-Reppen	511	9.5	−19.7
Labour	David Barlow	507	9.4	+2.0
Liberal Democrats	James Whiteside	481	8.9	−18.3
Liberal Democrats	John Webber	379	7.0	−22.2
Turnout		5,376	47.47	
Registered electors		11,326		
Conservative hold		Swing		
Conservative hold		Swing		
Conservative hold		Swing		

=== Chislehurst ===
Chislehurst (3 seats)
Party	Candidate	Votes	%	±%
Conservative	Kathleen Boughey	2,766	60.4	+1.5
Conservative	Eric Bousshard	2,702	59.0	+1.7
Conservative	Ian Payne	2,085	45.6	−1.5
UKIP	Janet Carlo	1,061	23.2	N/A
Labour	Yvette Connor	760	16.6	+10.9
Labour	Stuart Reid	677	14.8	+4.9
Labour	Christian Mole	668	14.6	+5.1
Green	Heather Wallace-Brown	594	13.0	+6.9
Liberal Democrats	Raymond Farnham	347	7.6	−11.9
Liberal Democrats	Ian Magrath	303	6.6	−9.2
Liberal Democrats	Michelle Pike	256	5.6	−11.3
Turnout		4,576	38.67	
Conservative hold		Swing		
Conservative hold		Swing		
Conservative hold		Swing		

=== Clock House ===
Clock House (3 seats)
Party	Candidate	Votes	%	±%
Labour	Vanessa Allen	1,900	39.9	+12.5
Conservative	Sarah Phillips	1,699	34.0	−0.9
Labour	Ian Dunn	1,663	33.3	+10.8
Labour	Joshua King	1,633	32.7	+13.4
Conservative	Nicholas Milner	1,594	31.9	±0.0
Conservative	Paul Wood	1,420	28.4	−2.2
Green	Margaret Toomey	922	18.5	+11.9
Liberal Democrats	Reginald Adams	818	16.4	−15.4
UKIP	Owen Brolly	784	15.7	+9.1
Liberal Democrats	Paul Nash	598	12.0	−14.8
Liberal Democrats	Joseph Henson	491	9.8	−16.6
Turnout		4,992	42.36	
Labour gain from Conservative		Swing		
Conservative hold		Swing		
Labour gain from Liberal Democrats		Swing		

=== Copers Cope ===
Copers Cope (3 seats)
Party	Candidate	Votes	%	±%
Conservative	Michael Tickner	2,453	52.7	+1.4
Conservative	Stephen Wells	2,380	51.1	−0.2
Conservative	Russell Mellor	2,232	47.9	−3.6
Labour	Catherine Milton	1,136	24.4	+8.5
Labour	John Dempster	1,000	21.5	+4.9
Labour	John Courtneidge	971	20.8	+5.8
Green	Ruth Fabricant	952	20.4	N/A
UKIP	Robert Bryant	890	19.1	N/A
Liberal Democrats	Elva Sullivan	590	12.7	−13.0
Turnout		4,659	38.64	
Conservative hold		Swing		
Conservative hold		Swing		
Conservative hold		Swing		

=== Cray Valley East ===
Cray Valley East (3 seats)
Party	Candidate	Votes	%	±%
Conservative	Angela Page	1,214	31.1	−8.4
Conservative	Christopher Pierce	1,210	31.0	−4.0
Conservative	Tuyet Phung Ball	1,188	30.4	−0.3
UKIP	James Greenhough	1,172	30.0	N/A
Liberal Democrats	Martin Curry	869	22.2	−12.2
Labour	Nathaniel Arthur	841	21.5	+5.4
Liberal Democrats	Grace Goodlad	803	20.6	−17.9
Labour	Timothy Fisher	745	19.1	+4.6
Liberal Democrats	Sam Webber	736	18.8	−13.8
Labour	Marina Ahmad	688	17.6	+5.0
BNP	Deborah Kane	284	7.3	−2.8
TUSC	Steven Cope	131	3.4	N/A
Turnout		3,909	35.58	
Conservative hold		Swing		
Conservative gain from Liberal Democrats		Swing		
Conservative hold		Swing		

=== Cray Valley West ===
Cray Valley West (3 seats)
Party	Candidate	Votes	%	±%
UKIP	David Livett	1,245	29.6	+18.4
UKIP	Terence Nathan	1,202	28.6	N/A
Conservative	Judith Ellis	1,133	26.9	−11.8
Conservative	John Ince	1,129	26.8	−9.8
Independent	Colin Willetts	1,095	26.0	N/A
UKIP	Daniel Tubb	1,040	24.7	N/A
Labour	Graham Du Plessis	939	22.3	+4.8
Conservative	Harry Stranger	914	21.7	−11.8
Labour	Christopher Taylor	892	21.2	+3.8
Labour	Rebecca Rowland	863	20.5	+3.6
Green	Sean Farrell	313	7.4	N/A
Liberal Democrats	Patricia Bignell	244	5.8	−17.6
Liberal Democrats	Michael Bignell	223	5.3	−21.7
Liberal Democrats	Nicholas Comrie	211	5.0	−17.2
BNP	Roger Tonks	139	3.3	−6.4
Turnout		4,210	34.85	
UKIP gain from Conservative		Swing		
UKIP gain from Conservative		Swing		
Conservative hold		Swing		

=== Crystal Palace ===
Crystal Palace (2 seats)
Party	Candidate	Votes	%	±%
Labour	Angela Wilkins	1,411	45.6	+13.0
Labour	Richard Williams	1,151	37.2	+9.4
Liberal Democrats	Thomas Papworth	838	27.1	−9.7
Liberal Democrats	Victoria Papworth	768	24.8	−17.5
Green	Tom Chance	575	18.6	+11.2
UKIP	David Hough	361	11.7	N/A
Conservative	Karen Moran	352	11.4	−4.7
Conservative	Robert McIlveen	280	9.0	−8.6
Turnout		3,095	37.06	
Labour gain from Liberal Democrats		Swing		
Labour gain from Liberal Democrats		Swing		

=== Darwin ===
Darwin (1 seat)
Party	Candidate	Votes	%	±%
Conservative	Richard Scoates	987	50.8	+4.7
UKIP	Geoffrey Hayward	661	34.0	+23.9
Labour	Frank Evans	135	6.9	N/A
Green	Tamara Galloway	89	4.6	N/A
Liberal Democrats	William Ritchie	65	3.3	N/A
Turnout		1,943	48.44	
Conservative hold		Swing		

=== Farnborough and Crofton ===
Farnborough and Crofton (3 seats)
Party	Candidate	Votes	%	±%
Conservative	Robert Evans	3,053	58.2	+0.7
Conservative	Charles Joel	3,005	57.3	−1.0
Conservative	Timothy Stevens	2,838	54.1	−1.0
UKIP	Christine Diamond	1,280	24.4	+16.1
UKIP	Kenneth Tracey	1,151	22.0	N/A
Labour	Ceri Hiles	717	13.7	+6.2
Labour	Lynn Sellwood	644	12.3	+5.1
Green	Brian Miller	638	12.2	N/A
Labour	Christopher Price	594	11.3	+4.1
Liberal Democrats	Seran Yusuf	415	7.9	−16.7
Turnout		5,246	44.96	
Conservative hold		Swing		
Conservative hold		Swing		
Conservative hold		Swing		

=== Hayes and Coney Hall ===
Hayes and Coney Hall (3 seats)
Party	Candidate	Votes	%	±%
Conservative	Graham Arthur	2,965	56.3	−1.7
Conservative	Neil Reddin	2,509	47.6	−6.5
Conservative	Peter Fortune	2,475	47.0	−14.3
UKIP	Gwendoline Tanner	1,349	25.6	N/A
UKIP	Brian Philp	1,259	23.9	N/A
Labour	Katherine Head	878	16.7	+3.6
Labour	John Parke	725	13.8	+2.7
Green	John Street	725	13.8	+4.3
Labour	Bernard Wilson	543	10.3	+1.3
Liberal Democrats	Owen Griffiths	503	9.5	−12.5
Liberal Democrats	Steven Daniell	374	7.1	−11.1
Turnout		5,269	42.10	
Conservative hold		Swing		
Conservative hold		Swing		
Conservative hold		Swing		

=== Kelsey and Eden Park ===
Kelsey and Eden Park (3 seats)
Party	Candidate	Votes	%	±%
Conservative	Alan Collins	2,778	54.7	−0.9
Conservative	Peter Dean	2,693	53.0	−0.7
Conservative	Diane Smith	2,593	51.0	−1.9
Labour	Marie Bardsley	1,191	23.4	+7.3
UKIP	Tobias Mercer	1,081	21.3	N/A
Labour	Stephen Scott	1,024	20.2	+4.6
Labour	Olasupoadekunle Obikoya	904	17.8	+3.4
Liberal Democrats	Geraldine Cowan	754	14.8	−9.0
Liberal Democrats	Kay Stocker	543	10.7	−12.6
Turnout		5,081	41.66	
Conservative hold		Swing		
Conservative hold		Swing		
Conservative hold		Swing		

=== Mottingham and Chislehurst North ===
Mottingham and Chislehurst North (2 seats)
Party	Candidate	Votes	%	±%
Conservative	David Cartwright	1,045	39.6	−9.5
Conservative	Charles Rideout	875	33.2	−8.9
UKIP	Karen Thomson	770	29.2	N/A
Labour	Angela Stack	663	25.1	+1.7
Labour	Samuel Russell	599	22.7	+1.4
Green	Zoe Mercer	278	10.5	+3.5
BNP	Philip Dalton	181	6.9	N/A
Liberal Democrats	Jane Coyte	130	4.9	−13.0
Turnout		2,638	36.26	
Conservative hold		Swing		
Conservative hold		Swing		

=== Orpington ===
Orpington (3 seats)
Party	Candidate	Votes	%	±%
Conservative	Kim Botting	2,519	49.7	+1.4
Conservative	Pauline Tunnicliffe	2,471	48.7	±0.0
Conservative	William Huntington-Thresher	2,452	48.3	−1.2
UKIP	Colin Wilson	1,290	25.4	N/A
UKIP	Jill Wilson	1,229	24.2	N/A
Labour	Alexander Stoten	739	14.6	+4.6
Green	Michael Marriott	681	13.4	+7.4
Labour	Jennifer Coleman	663	13.1	+3.6
Liberal Democrats	Michael Hall	558	11.0	−23.2
Labour	Mohammed Bhuiyan	556	11.0	+2.9
Liberal Democrats	Margaret Ayres	441	8.7	−21.3
Liberal Democrats	Douglas Rathbone	286	5.6	−23.8
Turnout		5,073	42.51	
Conservative hold		Swing		
Conservative hold		Swing		
Conservative hold		Swing		

=== Penge and Cator ===
Penge and Cator (3 seats)
Party	Candidate	Votes	%	±%
Labour	Kathy Bance	2,627	54.4	+12.9
Labour	Kevin Brooks	2,397	49.6	+7.7
Labour	Peter Fookes	2,273	47.1	+6.1
Conservative	Christopher Phillips	1,048	21.7	−9.8
Green	Geoffrey Allen	1,046	21.7	N/A
Conservative	Sarah Dalton	992	20.5	+0.5
Conservative	Thomas Stringer	805	16.7	−1.9
UKIP	Paul Johnson	786	16.3	N/A
Liberal Democrats	Austin Rathe	364	7.5	−23.6
Liberal Democrats	Simon Leeming	314	6.5	−21.2
Liberal Democrats	Andrew Sherwood	309	6.4	−20.1
Turnout		4,829	39.67	
Labour hold		Swing		
Labour hold		Swing		
Labour hold		Swing		

=== Petts Wood and Knoll ===
Petts Wood and Knoll (3 seats)
Party	Candidate	Votes	%	±%
Conservative	Douglas Auld	3,214	63.7	+3.2
Conservative	Anthony Owen	3,130	62.1	+2.6
Conservative	Simon Fawthrop	2,837	56.3	+2.0
UKIP	Mark Livett	1,045	20.7	+13.3
Labour	Maria Burton	709	14.1	+6.2
Green	Gillian Windall	671	13.3	+5.9
Labour	Richard Watts	546	10.8	+3.3
Labour	Mohammed Zaman	514	10.2	+4.1
Liberal Democrats	Nigel Taylor	497	9.9	−12.3
Liberal Democrats	John Loosemore	459	9.1	−13.0
Turnout		5,043	46.45	
Conservative hold		Swing		
Conservative hold		Swing		
Conservative hold		Swing		

=== Plaistow and Sundridge ===
Plaistow and Sundridge (3 seats)
Party	Candidate	Votes	%	±%
Conservative	Eleanor Harmer	1,792	42.6	−2.5
Conservative	Peter Morgan	1,737	41.3	−3.5
Conservative	Michael Turner	1,592	37.8	−5.1
Labour	Robert Armstrong	1,141	27.1	+8.7
Labour	Judith Armstrong	1,073	25.5	+8.6
UKIP	Martyn Clayton	1,009	24.0	+14.9
Labour	Ian Horrigan	999	23.7	+7.8
Green	Janet Wilson	775	18.4	+9.6
Liberal Democrats	Peter Furniss	471	11.2	−13.3
Liberal Democrats	David Pike	451	10.7	−11.0
Turnout		4,207	37.02	
Conservative hold		Swing		
Conservative hold		Swing		
Conservative hold		Swing		

=== Shortlands ===
Shortlands (2 seats)
Party	Candidate	Votes	%	±%
Conservative	David Jefferys	1,959	58.2	−6.3
Conservative	Mary Cooke	1,752	52.1	−0.9
UKIP	David Holland	655	19.5	N/A
Labour	Isabella Leslie	566	16.8	+9.2
Labour	Nicholas Comfort	484	14.4	−1.4
Green	Rachel Chance	396	11.8	−4.4
Liberal Democrats	Anne-Marie Atlay	334	9.9	−4.9
Turnout		3,365	43.78	
Conservative hold		Swing		
Conservative hold		Swing		

=== West Wickham ===
West Wickham (3 seats)
Party	Candidate	Votes	%	±%
Conservative	Jennifer Gray	2,823	53.2	−9.0
Conservative	Nicholas Bennett	2,820	53.2	−4.0
Conservative	Thomas Philpott	2,620	49.4	−11.4
UKIP	Peter Barnes	1,231	23.2	N/A
UKIP	Kenneth Munday	1,049	19.8	N/A
Labour	Susan Harris	947	17.9	+4.5
Labour	Colin Clary	940	17.7	+4.5
Labour	Richard Redden	859	16.2	+5.9
Green	Thomas Hill	601	11.3	N/A
Liberal Democrats	Nicola Beckett	461	8.7	−10.3
Turnout		5,304	44.38	
Conservative hold		Swing		
Conservative hold		Swing		
Conservative hold		Swing		

== See also ==
- Bromley Council
- 2014 London local elections
- 2014 United Kingdom local elections
- 2014 European Parliament election in the United Kingdom
