= 1990 Bromley London Borough Council election =

1990 local election in England

- 3 May 1990

All 60 seats for election to Bromley London Borough Council 31 seats needed for a majority
- Registered: 229,850
- Turnout: 114,460, 49.80%

	First party	Second party	Third party
Leader	Ernest D. Barkway	Unknown	Unknown
Party	Conservative	Labour	Liberal Democrats
Leader since	1986	Unknown	Unknown
Leader's seat	Hayes	Unknown	Unknown
Seats before	44	10	6 (Note: includes results from candidates listed under Lib Dem Focus Team and Lib Dem Briefing Team)
Seats won	43	11	6
Seat change	▼1	▲1	Steady
Popular vote	132,398	62,856	63,978
Percentage	50.13%	23.80%	24.22%
Council control before election
Conservative
Council control after election
Conservative

The 1990 Bromley Council election took place on 3 May 1990 to elect members of Bromley London Borough Council in London, England. The whole council was up for election and the Conservative Party stayed in overall control of the council.

== Election result ==
1990 Bromley London Borough Council elections
Party	Seats	Gains	Losses	Net gain/loss	Seats %	Votes %	Votes	+/−
Conservative	43	1	2	▼1	71.67	50.13	132,398	
Labour	11	1	0	▲1	18.33	23.80	62,856	
Liberal Democrats	6	1	1	Steady	10.00	24.22	63,978	
Green	0	0	0	Steady	0.00	0.92	2,429	
SDP	0	0	0	Steady	0.00	0.65	1,708	
Ind. Conservative	0	0	0	Steady	0.00	0.28	741	
Total	60						264,110	

== Ward results ==
(*) - Indicates an incumbent candidate

=== Anerley ===
Anerley (2)
Party	Candidate	Votes	%
Liberal Democrats	Christopher Gaster*	1,873	43.64
Liberal Democrats	Bill MacCormick	1,679	
Labour	Laurence Arterton	1,544	35.63
Labour	Mark Mason	1,356	
Conservative	David Burch	571	12.92
Conservative	Philip Haslop	480	
Green	Howard Fuller	318	7.81
Registered electors		8,574	
Turnout		4131	48.18
Rejected ballots		5	0.12
Liberal Democrats hold			
Liberal Democrats hold			

=== Bickley ===
Bickley (3)
Party	Candidate	Votes	%
Conservative	David Dear*	3,212	62.23
Conservative	Margaret Moir*	3,174	
Conservative	Simon Randall*	3,109	
Liberal Democrats	Michael Chuter	1,137	22.10
Lib Dem Focus Team	Keith Room	1,129	
Lib Dem Focus Team	Raymond Warner`	1,107	
Labour	Karen Benton	805	15.67
Labour	Michael D'Arcy	799	
Labour	Gwendoline Mansfield	787	
Registered electors		10,482	
Turnout		5297	50.53
Rejected ballots		6	0.11
Conservative hold			
Conservative hold			
Conservative hold			

=== Biggin Hill ===
Biggin Hill (2)
Party	Candidate	Votes	%
Conservative	David Haslam*	2,092	56.40
Conservative	Arthur Edgington*	2,066	
Liberal Democrats	Geoffrey Gostt	845	22.36
Lib Dem Focus Team	Robert Hatch	802	
Labour	Keith Galley	620	16.82
Labour	John Lewis	620	
SDP	Joan Welfare	163	4.42
Registered electors		8,183	
Turnout		3804	46.49
Rejected ballots		5	0.13
Conservative hold			
Conservative hold			

=== Bromley Common and Keston ===
Bromley Common and Keston (3)
Party	Candidate	Votes	%
Lib Dem Focus Team	Paul Booth* (Note: Booth replaced Cllr Smith after his resignation in 1988)	2,876	43.41
Conservative	Catherine Bustard	2,514	41.26
Lib Dem Focus Team	Anthony Phillips	2,483	
Conservative	John Hawes*	2,465	
Lib Dem Focus Team	Walter Shekyls	2,407	
Conservative	Rose Covell	2,404	
Labour	David Blackman	980	15.33
Labour	Mark Cole	919	
Labour	Stephen Mesure	844	
Registered electors		12,612	
Turnout		6388	50.65
Rejected ballots		11	0.17
Lib Dem Focus Team hold			
Conservative hold			
Lib Dem Focus Team gain from Conservative			

=== Chelsfield and Goddington ===
Chelsfield and Goddington (3)
Party	Candidate	Votes	%
Conservative	Reginald Adams*	3,164	49.60
Conservative	Judith Ellis	3,090	
Conservative	Julian Grainger	3,035	
Liberal Democrats	Martyn McLennan	2,508	39.28
Liberal Democrats	Justin Cockett	2,425	
Liberal Democrats	Violet Terrett	2,424	
Labour	Gillian Collins	730	11.12
Labour	Ernest Roberts	687	
Labour	David Humphreys	665	
Registered electors		11,904	
Turnout		6508	54.67
Rejected ballots		8	0.12
Conservative hold			
Conservative gain from Liberal Democrats			
Conservative hold			

=== Chislehurst ===
Chislehurst (3)
Party	Candidate	Votes	%
Conservative	Joan Bryant*	3,855	65.14
Conservative	Kathleen Boughey	3,792	
Conservative	Joan Wykes*	3,717	
Labour	Andrew Amos	1,215	20.79
Labour	Charles Phillips	1,210	
Labour	Paul Falkingham	1,203	
Liberal Democrats	John Kensit	855	14.07
Liberal Democrats	Peter Kreps	817	
Liberal Democrats	Ian Magrath	783	
Registered electors		12,766	
Turnout		6131	48.03
Rejected ballots		10	0.16
Conservative hold			
Conservative hold			
Conservative hold			

=== Clock House ===
Clock House (2)
Party	Candidate	Votes	%
Conservative	David Harding*	1,695	38.63
Labour	Nicholas Field	1,475	35.22
Conservative	Geoffrey Winnard	1,454	
Labour	Richard Jones	1,398	
Lib Dem Focus Team	Elisabeth Gee	1,100	26.15
Lib Dem Focus Team	Kathleen Milward	1,031	
Registered electors		8,115	
Turnout		4279	52.73
Rejected ballots		11	0.26
Conservative hold			
Labour gain from Conservative			

=== Copers Cope ===
Copers Cope (2)
Party	Candidate	Votes	%
Conservative	Christopher Elgar*	1,798	64.90
Conservative	Charles Priest*	1,674	
Labour	Charlotte Atkins	533	19.10
Labour	Eric Turner	489	
Liberal Democrats	David Evans	465	16.00
Liberal Democrats	Jonathan Coninx	391	
Registered electors		6,273	
Turnout		2798	44.60
Rejected ballots		6	0.21
Conservative hold			
Conservative hold			

=== Crofton ===
Crofton (2)
Party	Candidate	Votes	%
Conservative	Paul Bonter*	2,361	52.96
Conservative	Peter Sturdy*	2,359	
Liberal Democrats	Gillian Chamarette	1,455	32.43
Liberal Democrats	Harry Silvester	1,434	
Labour	Geoffrey Ball	553	11.78
Labour	Neil Thomas	497	
SDP	Christopher Taylor	126	2.83
Registered electors		8,250	
Turnout		4597	55.72
Rejected ballots		7	0.15
Conservative hold			
Conservative hold			

=== Darwin ===
Darwin (1)
Party	Candidate	Votes	%
Conservative	Peter Bloomfield*	1,343	73.15
Labour	Sylvia Whitlock	273	14.87
Liberal Democrats	Malcolm Westbrook	220	11.98
Registered electors		3,401	
Turnout		1839	54.07
Rejected ballots		3	0.16
Conservative hold			

=== Eden Park ===
Eden Park (2)
Party	Candidate	Votes	%
Conservative	Francis Cooke*	1,941	57.69
Conservative	Albert Miles*	1,844	
Labour	Janice Cooke	892	25.33
Labour	Jeremiah Mondry	769	
Liberal Democrats	Jeremy Cope	585	16.98
Liberal Democrats	Mark Soady	529	
Registered electors		7,376	
Turnout		3448	46.75
Rejected ballots		6	0.17
Conservative hold			
Conservative hold			

=== Farnborough ===
Farnborough (2)
Party	Candidate	Votes	%
Conservative	Eric Goodman*	2,393	68.45
Conservative	Jennifer Hiller*	2,348	
Liberal Democrats	Constance Baker	657	18.50
Liberal Democrats	Eric Spencer	625	
Labour	Odette Coram	458	13.05
Labour	George Cox	445	
Registered electors		7,306	
Turnout		3611	49.42
Rejected ballots		3	0.08
Conservative hold			
Conservative hold			

=== Hayes ===
Hayes (3)
Party	Candidate	Votes	%
Conservative	Ernest Barkway*	3,372	56.01
Conservative	Philip Jones*	3,211	
Conservative	Nigel Kelsh*	3,157	
Labour	Daniel Carrigan	1,056	17.46
Labour	Stephen Clarke	1,044	
Labour	Roy Shufflebotham	935	
Liberal Democrats	Jennifer Fitch	791	12.44
Liberal Democrats	Catherine Stokes	700	
Liberal Democrats	Roy Southgate	672	
Green	Donald Baldwin	562	9.69
SDP	William Faulder	255	4.40
Registered electors		11,179	
Turnout		5570	49.83
Rejected ballots		2	0.04
Conservative hold			
Conservative hold			
Conservative hold			

=== Kelsey Park ===
Kelsey Park (2)
Party	Candidate	Votes	%
Conservative	Maurice Mason*	2,397	70.56
Conservative	Michael Tickner*	2,356	
Liberal Democrats	Hilary Gaster	548	15.76
Liberal Democrats	Edward Whitaker	514	
Labour	Wheldon Roberts	463	13.68
Labour	Neil Entwistle	459	
Registered electors		6,850	
Turnout		3478	50.77
Rejected ballots		17	0.49
Conservative hold			
Conservative hold			

=== Lawrie Park & Kent House ===
Lawrie Park and Kent House (2)
Party	Candidate	Votes	%
Conservative	Richard Foister*	1,498	39.09
Conservative	John Lewis*	1,455	
Labour	Kenneth Ritchie	1,182	30.31
Labour	David Sawkins	1,108	
Lib Dem Focus Team	Peter White	929	23.85
Lib Dem Focus Team	Gerald Williams	872	
Green	James Strachan	255	6.75
Registered electors		7,380	
Turnout		3832	51.92
Rejected ballots		1	0.03
Conservative hold			
Conservative hold			

=== Martins Hill and Town ===
Martins Hill and Town (2)
Party	Candidate	Votes	%
Conservative	Philip Hollobone	1,532	45.21
Conservative	Anthony Wilkinson*	1,431	
Labour	Cecil Dean	886	26.45
Labour	Susan Yates	847	
Green	Ederyn Williams	435	13.27
Liberal Democrats	John Maydwell	287	8.72
Liberal Democrats	Gordon Stephens	284	
SDP	Terence Simpson	208	6.35
Registered electors		7,375	
Turnout		3204	43.44
Rejected ballots		3	0.09
Conservative hold			
Conservative hold			

=== Mottingham ===
Mottingham (2)
Party	Candidate	Votes	%
Labour	Ernest Dyer	1,953	52.85
Labour	Gordon Yates	1,866	
Conservative	Michael Hennessey	1,201	33.23
Liberal Democrats	Brian Taylor	524	13.92
Liberal Democrats	John Hassall	481	
Registered electors		7,433	
Turnout		3894	52.39
Rejected ballots		8	0.21
Labour hold			
Labour hold			

=== Orpington Central ===
Orpington Central (2)
Party	Candidate	Votes	%
Liberal Democrats	Christopher Maines*	2,011	51.34
Liberal Democrats	Michael Norris*	1,978	
Conservative	Linda Archer	1,142	28.05
Conservative	Martin Reef	1,038	
Labour	Richard Harcourt	825	20.61
Labour	Grahame Kean	777	
Registered electors		7,333	
Turnout		4051	55.24
Rejected ballots		7	0.17
Liberal Democrats hold			
Liberal Democrats hold			

=== Penge ===
Penge (2)
Party	Candidate	Votes	%
Labour	Patricia Mansfield* (Note: Mansfield replaced Cllr Mansfield after his death in 1988)	1,610	50.07
Labour	Peter Fookes	1,463	
Conservative	Malcolm Hyland	905	27.65
Conservative	Khalid Sharif	793	
Green	Simonm Clayton	376	12.25
Liberal Democrats	Tina Boultbee	327	10.03
Liberal Democrats	Reginald Adams	288	
Registered electors		7,408	
Turnout		3150	42.52
Rejected ballots		7	0.22
Labour hold			
Labour hold			

=== Petts Wood and Knoll ===
Petts Wood and Knoll (3)
Party	Candidate	Votes	%
Conservative	Joan Hatcher*	3,797	52.86
Conservative	Peter Woods	3,666	
Conservative	Anthony Owen* (Note: Owen replaced Cllr Edwards)	3,589	
Liberal Democrats	Jean Dearle	1,216	16.71
Liberal Democrats	Christopher Bratt	1,186	
Liberal Democrats	Jean Tinsley	1,092	
Labour	Rosalie Huzzard	958	12.87
Labour	Marcus Shellard	872	
Labour	Richard Watts	860	
Ind. Conservative	Brian Atkinson	741	10.63
Green	Heli Williams	483	6.93
Registered electors		11,910	
Turnout		6467	54.30
Rejected ballots		4	0.06
Conservative hold			
Conservative hold			
Conservative hold			

=== Plaistow and Sundridge ===
Plaistow and Sundridge (3)
Party	Candidate	Votes	%
Conservative	Raymond Ainsby	2,926	56.03
Conservative	Dorothy Laird*	2,843	
Conservative	Paul Jemetta	2,797	
Labour	Robert Armstrong	1,343	25.36
Labour	Michael King	1,298	
Labour	Nicholas Wright	1,234	
Liberal Democrats	Michael Deves	959	18.61
Liberal Democrats	William Scally	944	
Liberal Democrats	Lennard Woods	941	
Registered electors		11,555	
Turnout		5427	46.97
Rejected ballots		15	0.28
Conservative hold			
Conservative hold			
Conservative hold			

=== St. Mary Cray ===
St Mary Cray (3)
Party	Candidate	Votes	%
Labour	John Holbrook*	2,541	49.62
Labour	Mark Smith*	2,362	
Labour	Susan Polydorou	2,320	
Conservative	Richard Jackson	1,764	35.24
Conservative	Timothy Stevens	1,691	
Conservative	Lionel O'Hara	1,675	
Liberal Democrats	Duncan Borrowman	772	15.14
Liberal Democrats	Elizabeth Lander	742	
Liberal Democrats	Robert Woollett	692	
Registered electors		11,382	
Turnout		5213	45.80
Rejected ballots		9	0.17
Labour hold			
Labour hold			
Labour hold			

=== St Paul's Cray ===
St Paul's Cray (3)
Party	Candidate	Votes	%
Labour	Selwyn Ward*	2,350	41.07
Labour	Colin Willetts	2,312	
Labour	Christopher Purnell	2,195	
Lib Dem Focus Team	Thomas Hawthorne	2,083	36.31
Lib Dem Focus Team	George Watson	2,035	
Lib Dem Focus Team	Stephen Wilson	1,946	
Conservative	Bernard Cobley	1,273	22.62
Conservative	Gladys Hobbs	1,253	
Conservative	Edna Bensaid	1,250	
Registered electors		12,270	
Turnout		6027	49.12
Rejected ballots		10	0.17
Labour hold			
Labour hold			
Labour hold			

=== Shortlands ===
Shortlands (2)
Party	Candidate	Votes	%
Conservative	John Charnley*	2,699	68.61
Conservative	Brian Reading*	2,560	
Liberal Democrats	Jane Green	746	18.63
Liberal Democrats	Olive Chapman	682	
Labour	Robert Hughes	491	12.76
Labour	Richard Seabrook	486	
Registered electors		7,715	
Turnout		3928	50.91
Rejected ballots		8	0.20
Conservative hold			
Conservative hold			

=== West Wickham North ===
West Wickham North (2)
Party	Candidate	Votes	%
Conservative	Montague Blazey*	2,184	64.98
Conservative	Brian Humphrys*	2,175	
Lib Dem Briefing Team	Graham Radford	715	20.77
Lib Dem Briefing Team	Peter Ward	679	
Labour	Russell Miller	492	14.25
Labour	Richard Richards	463	
Registered electors		7,054	
Turnout		3470	49.19
Rejected ballots		7	0.20
Conservative hold			
Conservative hold			

=== West Wickham South ===
West Wickham South (2)
Party	Candidate	Votes	%
Conservative	Kenneth Crask*	2,452	64.12
Conservative	John Gray*	2,366	
Labour	Jean Gibbons	527	13.84
Labour	Peter Rance	512	
SDP	Richard Cox	492	12.72
SDP	Richard Redden	464	
Liberal Democrats	Clive Barton	360	9.32
Liberal Democrats	Susan Ford	340	
Registered electors		7,764	
Turnout		3918	50.46
Rejected ballots		5	0.13
Conservative hold			
Conservative hold			
