= 1982 Bromley London Borough Council election =

The 1982 Bromley Council election took place on 6 May 1982 to elect members of Bromley London Borough Council in London, England. The whole council was up for election and the Conservative party stayed in overall control of the council.

== Ward results ==
=== Beckenham ===
Anerley (2)
Party	test	Votes	%	±%
SDP	Christopher Richard Gaster*	1,365	40.9	
SDP	Paul H Brown*	1,341		
Labour	Ian M Haig	1,063	31.9	
Labour	Dominic P Herlihy			
Conservative	Roland Lees	907	27.2	
Conservative	Albert George Miles			

Clock House (2)
Party	Candidate	Votes	%	±%
Conservative	David J Harding*	1,831	44.6	
Conservative	Terence Stanley*	1,719		
SDP	Olga L Roberts	1,424	34.7	+18.4
Liberal	Stephen J Marshall			
Labour	Bryan Edwin Freake	1,461	20.7	−14.6
Labour	David N P Radlett			
Majority			9.9	+1.2
Turnout			50.3	
Conservative hold		Swing		

Copers Cope (2)
Party	Candidate	Votes	%	±%
Conservative	John L Pritchard*		57.8	−16.8
Conservative	Charles George Priest*			
SDP	Laurence J Cox		21.3	+10.1
Liberal	William Alan Macdonald MacCormick			
Ind. Conservative	Christopher John Elgar		12.7	n/a
Labour	Ann M Silverman		8.2	−6.0
Labour	Eric H Turner			
Majority			36.5	−23.9
Turnout			45.1	+5.4
Conservative hold		Swing		

Eden Park (2)
Party	Candidate	Votes	%	±%
Conservative	Francis J D Cooke*		58.5	−7.4
Conservative	Peter F Dixon*			
Liberal	Christine Oakenfull		32.4	+15.2
Liberal	Derek G Brent			
Labour	Wendy C Palace		9.0	−7.9
Labour	Brian Stapleton			
Majority			26.1	−22.7
Turnout			50.1	+4.3
Conservative hold		Swing		

Kelsey Park (2)
Party	Candidate	Votes	%	±%
Conservative	Michael John B Tickner*		74.1	−4.0
Conservative	Maurice J Mason*			
Liberal	Paul David Nash		20.3	+6.4
SDP	Andrew F Clyro			
Labour	Philip Cooke		5.6	−2.4
Labour	Finola M Dignan			
Majority			53.8	−4.4
Turnout			50.9	+5.5
Conservative hold		Swing		

Lawrie Park & Kent House (2)
Party	Candidate	Votes	%	±%
Conservative	Richard D. Foister*		51.3	−5.6
Conservative	John Arthur M. Lewis*			
SDP	Bryan C Friend		25.1	+18.4
SDP	Geoffrey P Farrington			
Labour	Laurence R Pocock		23.7	−12.6
Labour	Derek K Robbins			

Penge (2)
Party	Candidate	Votes	%	±%
Liberal	Heather Isabel Donovan	940	36.0	+30.2
Labour	Arthur J Mansfield*	911	34.9	−16.6
Liberal	Jonathan R Coninx	906		
Labour	Barbara Pedley*	902		
Conservative	Robert G Straker	761	29.1	−4.2
Conservative	Rita Horowitz	725		
Majority			1.1	19.2
Turnout			38.9	
Liberal gain from Labour		Swing	+9.6	

Shortlands (2)
Party	Candidate	Votes	%	±%
Conservative	Bernard E G Davies*	2,818	75.0	−7.2
Conservative	Brian R Reading*			
SDP	Graham R F Till	733	19.5	+10.9
Liberal	Melanie L Worman			
Labour	Pauline M Jones	204	5.4	−3.8
Labour	Jonathan A M Patterson			
Majority			55.5	
Turnout			51.7	
Conservative hold		Swing		

=== Chislehurst ===
Bickley (3)
Party	Candidate	Votes	%	±%
Conservative	Maurice Bentley Kenward*		76.9	−10.0
Conservative	Margaret Doreen Moir			
Conservative	Simon J C Randall*			
SDP	Colin T Hawksworth		25.8	+15.2
Liberal	Ervin G Muller			
Liberal	Stephen G Trimmer			
Labour	Gwendoline I Mansfield		7.3	−5.2
Labour	Paul W Francis			
Labour	Harry J Belsey			
Majority			41.2	−23.2
Turnout			50.9	+5.4
Conservative hold		Swing	-11.6	

Chislehurst (3)
Party	Candidate	Votes	%	±%
Conservative	Joan Bryant*		72.1	−3.4
Conservative	Edward A J Rayner			
Conservative	Charles Christopher Seward Reeves*			
SDP	Muriel A Letman		18.1	+9.0
Liberal	John P Hassall			
Liberal	Stephen R Walls			
Labour	Edgar C H Smith		9.9	−5.5
Labour	Martyn G Jenkins			
Labour	Ralph E Hunte			
Majority			54.0	−6.2
Turnout			49.8	−0.8
Conservative hold		Swing		

Mottingham (2)
Party	Candidate	Votes	%	±%
Labour	Alistair Huistean Macdonald*		45.7	−18.3
Labour	Elizabeth A Vincent			
Conservative	Amanda J Hunt		30.2	+1.9
Conservative	Martin Tweed			
Liberal	Brian Harry Taylor		24.1	+20.1
SDP	Peter H Anderson			
Majority			15.5	−20.2
Turnout			44.1	−6.5
Labour hold		Swing	-10.1	

Plaistow & Sundridge (3)
Party	Candidate	Votes	%	±%
Conservative	Richard B Jackson*		59.5	−0.3
Conservative	Dorothy Joan Laird*			
Conservative	Arthur J Wilkinson*			
Liberal	Michael F Deves		26.4	+17.1
SDP	Ian G Anderson			
Liberal	David C Pike			
Labour	Geoffrey C Whitlow		14.1	−16.8
Labour	Peter R Haswell			
Labour	Nicholas Anthony Wright			
Majority			33.1	+4.1
Turnout			45.5	+1.4
Conservative hold		Swing	+2.0	

St Paul's Cray (3)
Party	Candidate	Votes	%	±%
Labour	Walter K Mansfield*		40.1	−21.7
Conservative	Gladys P Hobbs	1,547	36.0	+4.1
Labour	Selwyn H Ward	1,528		
Labour	Ronald William Huzzard	1,518		
Conservative	Dennis E Kershaw	1,508		
Conservative	Albert E Stayte	1,493		
SDP	Sylvia Conway		23.9	+17.6
SDP	John M Barber			
Liberal	Peter Alan Janikoun			
Majority			29.9	−25.8
Turnout			38.0	−1.0
Conservative gain from Labour		Swing	+12.9	

=== Orpington ===
Chelsfield & Goddington (3)
Party	Candidate	Votes	%	±%
Conservative	Michael A Lowe		55.7	−11.7
Conservative	Reginald G Adams*			
Conservative	Joseph T Heath*			
Liberal	Patrick McNally		38.4	+17.5
Liberal	John C A Sachs			
Liberal	Sidney C O Langford			
Labour	Linda T Tyler		6.0	−5.7
Labour	Ronald G D'Olley			
Labour	Leonard David Hall			
Majority			17.3	−29.1
Turnout			54.9	+4.3
Conservative hold		Swing	-14.5	

Crofton (2)
Party	Candidate	Votes	%	±%
Conservative	Paul Martin Bonter		61.0	−6.2
Conservative	Peter Sturdy			
SDP	Peter J B Paul		33.5	+10.6
Liberal	Harry Anthony Silvester			
Labour	John Fowler		5.5	−4.4
Labour	Magali P Williamson			
Majority			33.5	−16.8
Turnout			55.4	+2.2
Conservative hold		Swing	-8.4	

Farnborough (2)
Party	Candidate	Votes	%	±%
Conservative	Eric Norman Goodman*		76.9	−5.1
Conservative	Jennifer Mary Hillier*			
Liberal	Terence Frank Clark		23.4	+11.5
Liberal	Roy T Hawkins			
Labour	Geoffrey J Ball		4.8	−6.4
Labour	Catherine M Hossack			
Majority			48.4	−16.6
Turnout			50.5	−0.2
Conservative hold		Swing	-8.4	

Orpington Central (2)
Party	Candidate	Votes	%	±%
Conservative	Michael A Minter*		50.0	
Conservative	David Malcolm Dear			
Liberal	Christopher Stewart Maines		39.1	+16.9
SDP	Michael Sullivan			
Labour	Simon D Gale		12.8	−15.0
Labour	Nigel Williamson			
Majority			8.9	−13.2
Turnout			49.6	+4.0
Conservative hold		Swing	-6.6	

Petts Wood & Knoll (3)
Party	Candidate	Votes	%	±%
Conservative	Joan Hatcher*		68.6	−22.4
Conservative	Michael J Edwards			
Conservative	Brian V Atkinson*			
Ind. Conservative	Peter Charles Woods		30.4	n/a
SDP	Beatrice W Hedley		19.3	−1.9
Liberal	Graham Leslie Arthur			
Liberal	Irene R Hinchcliffe			
Labour	Jeffrey R Bartley		4.1	−6.1
Labour	Marcus R Shellard			
Labour	Peter John Tozer			
Majority			15.8	−31.6
Turnout			53.6	−0.2
Conservative hold		Swing	-15.8	

St Mary Cray (3)
Party	Candidate	Votes	%	±%
Conservative	Harry R Stranger		39.0	−3.4
Conservative	Norman F Mingay			
Conservative	Bruce G Panes	1,831		
Labour	Doris Partridge*	1,673	33.3	−
Labour	Keith R Morton*			
Labour	Martin E Synan			
Liberal	James C Loveday		27.6	+19.1
Liberal	John W Hand			
SDP	David C Churney			
Majority			6.7	12.4
Turnout			44.5	+2.4
Conservative gain from Labour		Swing	+6.2	

=== Ravensbourne ===
Biggin Hill (2)
Party	Candidate	Votes	%	±%
Conservative	David W Hanscomb*	2,286	59.7	−4.0
Conservative	David Robert Haslam*	2,229		
Liberal	Malcolm Bruce Westbrook	1,235	32.3	+13.9
Liberal	Geoffrey Colin Gostt	1,213		
Labour	Alison N Sheldrake	308	8.0	−9.9
Labour	Mairede C Thomas	299		
Majority			27.4	−17.8
Turnout			52.1	+3.5
Conservative hold				
Conservative hold				

Bromley Common & Keston (3)
Party	Candidate	Votes	%	±%
Conservative	Colin R English		53.2	−2.1
Conservative	Raymond L Ainsby*			
Conservative	Russell Lawrence Mellor*			
Liberal	Robert H Smith		25.1	+18.7
Liberal	Martin Alan Curry			
SDP	Catherine Mary Boston			
Labour	Naomi V Carter		21.7	−12.8
Labour	Mark Cole			
Labour	Rodger A Macpherson			
Majority			28.1	+7.2
Turnout			41.5	−0.9
Conservative hold		Swing	+3.6	

Darwin (1)
Party	Candidate	Votes	%	±%
Conservative	Peter John Bloomfield		67.6	−6.3
Liberal	Derek J Goldsmith		25.8	+10.7
Labour	John R Willman		6.7	−4.3
Majority			41.8	−17.0
Turnout			56.6	+3.0
Conservative hold		Swing	-8.5	

Hayes (3)
Party	Candidate	Votes	%	±%
Conservative	Ernest Dennis Barkway*		64.9	−9.7
Conservative	Philip Geoffrey Jones*			
Conservative	James F David*			
Liberal	William Ivor Shipley		28.0	+16.3
Liberal	Ronald Coverson			
SDP	Anne Wendy Chaplin			
Labour	Julian R Smith		7.1	−6.6
Labour	Stephen J Robert			
Labour	Charles J Wallace			
Majority			36.9	−24.0
Turnout			44.3	+3.5
Conservative hold		Swing	-12.0	

Martins Hill & Town (2)
Party	Candidate	Votes	%	±%
Conservative	William F D Walker*		53.5	−11.0
Conservative	Anthony Millar Wilkinson*			
Liberal	Jennifer M Hawke		34.4	+24.2
SDP	David B Hunt			
Labour	Susan L Dudding		12.1	−13.1
Labour	Alan M Pickering			
Majority			19.0	−20.3
Turnout			43.4	+6.3
Conservative hold		Swing	-10.1	

West Wickham North (2)
Party	Candidate	Votes	%	±%
Conservative	Montague I Blasey*		67.8	−9.8
Conservative	Percy C Read*			
Liberal	John Raymond Maydwell		24.3	+14.8
SDP	Phyllis S Vickers			
Labour	Desmond P Atkinson		7.9	−5.0
Labour	Hugh P Atkinson			
Majority			43.5	−21.2
Turnout			48.3	+3.1
Conservative hold		Swing	-10.6	

West Wickham South (2)
Party	Candidate	Votes	%	±%
Conservative	Kenneth V Crask*		70.4	−4.6
Conservative	Leslie G Whitman*			
SDP	Richard Henry Redden		23.8	+15.6
Liberal	Gordon J Stephens			
Labour	Richard Richards		5.8	−11.0
Labour	Gordon D Wright			
Majority			46.6	−11.5
Turnout			48.3	+1.9
Conservative hold		Swing	-5.7	
