= 1986 Bromley London Borough Council election =

1986 local election in England

The 1986 Bromley Council election took place on 8 May 1986 to elect members of Bromley London Borough Council in London, England. The whole council was up for election and the Conservative Party stayed in overall control of the council.

== Ward results ==
=== Beckenham ===
Anerley (2)
| Party | test | Votes | % | ±% |
|---|---|---|---|---|
| SDP | Paul H Brown* | 1,591 | 45.8 | +4.9 |
| SDP | Christopher Richard Gaster* | 1,580 | | |
| Labour | Michael J D'Arcy | 1,282 | 36.9 | +5.0 |
| Labour | Wendy C Palace | | | |
| Conservative | Nicholas M Grove | 603 | 17.3 | −9.9 |
| Conservative | Benjamin W C Waterhouse | 579 | | |
| Majority | | | 8.9 | −0.5 |
| Turnout | | | 44.7 | |
| SDP hold | | Swing | -0.0 | |

Clock House (2)
| Party | Candidate | Votes | % | ±% |
|---|---|---|---|---|
| Conservative | David J Harding* | 1,644 | 40.6 | −4.0 |
| Conservative | Roderick A Reed | 1,507 | | |
| SDP | Anne Wendy Chaplin | 1,369 | 33.8 | −0.9 |
| Liberal | Stephen R Walls | 1,318 | | |
| Labour | Mark C Mason | 1,038 | 25.6 | +4.9 |
| Labour | Andrew S Berry | 1,033 | | |
| Majority | | | 6.8 | −3.1 |
| Turnout | | | 50.6 | +0.3 |
| Conservative hold | | Swing | -1.5 | |

Copers Cope (2)
| Party | Candidate | Votes | % | ±% |
|---|---|---|---|---|
| Conservative | Christopher John Elgar* | | 66.3 | +8.5 |
| Conservative | Charles George Priest* | | | |
| Liberal | Julie D King | | 20.6 | −0.7 |
| SDP | Peter Townsend | | | |
| Labour | Malcolm R Newbury | | 13.1 | +4.9 |
| Labour | Eric H Turner | | | |
| Majority | | | 45.7 | +9.2 |
| Turnout | | | 41.7 | −3.4 |
| Conservative hold | | Swing | +4.6 | |

Eden Park (2)
| Party | Candidate | Votes | % | ±% |
|---|---|---|---|---|
| Conservative | Francis J D Cooke* | | 56.0 | −2.5 |
| Conservative | Albert George Miles | | | |
| SDP | Richard Evans | | 28.9 | −3.5 |
| Liberal | Bernice Nieto | | | |
| Labour | Maureen T Laurence | | 15.1 | +6.1 |
| Labour | Ciaran J Tyndall | | | |
| Majority | | | 27.1 | +1.0 |
| Turnout | | | 44.9 | −5.2 |
| Conservative hold | | Swing | +0.5 | |

Kelsey Park (2)
| Party | Candidate | Votes | % | ±% |
|---|---|---|---|---|
| Conservative | Maurice J Mason* | | 70.9 | −3.2 |
| Conservative | Michael John B Tickner* | | | |
| SDP | John P S Hordern | | 20.8 | +0.5 |
| Liberal | George L Whitehorn | | | |
| Labour | Janice M Cooke | | 8.3 | +2.7 |
| Labour | Bryan Edwin Freake | | | |
| Majority | | | 50.1 | −3.7 |
| Turnout | | | 46.7 | −4.2 |
| Conservative hold | | Swing | -1.8 | |

Lawrie Park & Kent House (2)
| Party | Candidate | Votes | % | ±% |
|---|---|---|---|---|
| Conservative | Richard D. Foister* | | 46.6 | −4.7 |
| Conservative | John Arthur M. Lewis* | | | |
| Labour | Michael J Curran | | 32.9 | +9.2 |
| Labour | Derek K Robbins | | | |
| Liberal | Paul David Nash | | 20.5 | −4.6 |
| SDP | Richard Holbech Boultbee | | | |
| Majority | | | 13.7 | −13.9 |
| Turnout | | | 46.9 | |
| Conservative hold | | Swing | -6.9 | |

Penge (2)
| Party | Candidate | Votes | % | ±% |
|---|---|---|---|---|
| Labour | Arthur J Mansfield* | 1,369 | 43.4 | +8.5 |
| Labour | Laurence R Pocock | 1,199 | | |
| Liberal | Heather Isabel Donovan* | 963 | 30.5 | −5.5 |
| Liberal | Jonathan R Coninx | 908 | | |
| Conservative | Penelope J Hunter | 824 | 26.1 | −3.0 |
| Conservative | Geoffrey J Winnard | 802 | | |
| Majority | | | 12.9 | 14.0 |
| Turnout | | | 43.1 | +4.2 |
| Labour gain from Liberal | | Swing | +7.0 | |

Shortlands (2)
| Party | Candidate | Votes | % | ±% |
|---|---|---|---|---|
| Conservative | John Charnley | | 66.9 | −8.1 |
| Conservative | Brian R Reading* | | | |
| SDP | Stuart Philip Bayliss | | 23.9 | +4.4 |
| Liberal | John S Oakenfull | | | |
| Labour | Pauline M Jones | | 9.2 | +3.8 |
| Labour | Philip Cooke | | | |
| Majority | | | 43.0 | −12.5 |
| Turnout | | | 46.5 | −5.2 |
| Conservative hold | | Swing | -6.2 | |

=== Chislehurst ===
Bickley (3)
| Party | Candidate | Votes | % | ±% |
|---|---|---|---|---|
| Conservative | David Malcolm Dear | | 50.5 | −26.4 |
| Conservative | Margaret Doreen Moir | | | |
| Conservative | Simon J C Randall* | 2,894 | | |
| Liberal | Ervin G Muller* | 2,512 | 43.1 | +17.3 |
| SDP | Gillian L Collins | | | |
| Liberal | Maureen T Brodie | | | |
| Labour | Herbert J Gentry | | | |
| Labour | Gwendoline I Mansfield | | 6.4 | −0.9 |
| Labour | Howard E Kniveton | | | |
| Majority | | | 54.1 | +12.9 |
| Turnout | | | 50.9 | +5.4 |
| Conservative hold | | Swing | +6.4 | |

Chislehurst (3)
| Party | Candidate | Votes | % | ±% |
|---|---|---|---|---|
| Conservative | Joan Bryant* | | 60.4 | −11.7 |
| Conservative | Charles Christopher Seward Reeves* | | | |
| Conservative | Joan Kathleen Wykes | | | |
| Labour | Charles Phillips | | 21.2 | +11.3 |
| Labour | Ronald D Deadman | | | |
| Labour | Peter G Warner | | | |
| SDP | Muriel A Letman | | 18.4 | +0.3 |
| SDP | Robert Turgoose | | | |
| Liberal | Robert R V Woollett | | | |
| Majority | | | 39.1 | −14.9 |
| Turnout | | | 45.5 | −4.3 |
| Conservative hold | | Swing | | |

Mottingham (2)
| Party | Candidate | Votes | % | ±% |
|---|---|---|---|---|
| Labour | Alistair Huistean Macdonald* | | 45.7 | +3.2 |
| Labour | Patricia A Waitman | | | |
| Conservative | Michael John Hennessey | | 26.2 | −4.0 |
| SDP | Peter H Anderson | | 26.0 | +1.9 |
| Liberal | Brian Harry Taylor | | | |
| Conservative | Julian Patrick Greville Grainger | | | |
| Majority | | | 21.5 | +6.0 |
| Turnout | | | 48.9 | +4.8 |
| Labour hold | | Swing | +3.0 | |

Plaistow & Sundridge (3)
| Party | Candidate | Votes | % | ±% |
|---|---|---|---|---|
| Conservative | Richard B Jackson* | | 52.5 | −7.0 |
| Conservative | Dorothy Joan Laird* | | | |
| Conservative | Arthur J Wilkinson* | | | |
| Liberal | Michael F Deves | | 28.6 | +2.2 |
| SDP | William A Scally | | | |
| Liberal | Lennard Douglas Woods | | | |
| Labour | Madeline A Borland | | 18.9 | +4.8 |
| Labour | Rex V Barnes | | | |
| Labour | Nicholas Anthony Wright | | | |
| Majority | | | 33.1 | −9.2 |
| Turnout | | | 45.5 | −1.2 |
| Conservative hold | | Swing | -4.6 | |

St Paul's Cray (3)
| Party | Candidate | Votes | % | ±% |
|---|---|---|---|---|
| Labour | Walter Kenneth Mansfield* | | 40.1 | +10.3 |
| Labour | Selwyn H Ward* | | | |
| Labour | Ira G Walters | | | |
| Conservative | Gladys P Hobbs* | | 28.6 | −7.4 |
| Conservative | Bernard J Cobley | | | |
| Conservative | Albert E Stayte | | | |
| Liberal | George H Watson | | 20.9 | −3.0 |
| SDP | Stephen J Wilson | | | |
| SDP | Terence E Simpson | | | |
| Majority | | | 21.8 | −8.1 |
| Turnout | | | 40.6 | +2.6 |
| Labour gain from Conservative | | Swing | | |

=== Orpington ===
Chelsfield & Goddington (3)
| Party | Candidate | Votes | % | ±% |
|---|---|---|---|---|
| Conservative | Reginald G Adams* | 2,827 | 45.6 | −10.1 |
| Liberal | Jonathan Harold Fryer | 2,775 | 44.7 | +6.3 |
| Conservative | Joseph T Heath* | 2,752 | | |
| Conservative | Bruce G Panes | 2,714 | | |
| Liberal | Kathleen A Jolly | 2,576 | | |
| Liberal | Sidney C O Langford | 2,561 | | |
| Labour | Ronald G D'Olley | | 9.7 | +3.7 |
| Labour | Trevor E Phillips | | | |
| Labour | David N Humphreys | | | |
| Majority | | | 0.8 | −16.5 |
| Turnout | | | 51.9 | −3.0 |
| Liberal gain from Conservative | | Swing | +8.2 | |

Crofton (2)
| Party | Candidate | Votes | % | ±% |
|---|---|---|---|---|
| Conservative | Paul Martin Bonter* | | 51.5 | −9.5 |
| Conservative | Peter Sturdy* | | | |
| Liberal | Phillip F Dearle | | 36.9 | +3.4 |
| Liberal | Harry Anthony Silvester | | | |
| Labour | Geoffrey H Ball | | 11.6 | +6.1 |
| Labour | Graham E Kom | | | |
| Majority | | | 14.6 | −18.9 |
| Turnout | | | 48.6 | −6.8 |
| Conservative hold | | Swing | -9.4 | |

Farnborough (2)
| Party | Candidate | Votes | % | ±% |
|---|---|---|---|---|
| Conservative | Eric Norman Goodman* | | 63.7 | −13.2 |
| Conservative | Jennifer Mary Hillier* | | | |
| Liberal | Terence Frank Clark | | 27.3 | +3.9 |
| Liberal | Paul D Solloway | | | |
| Labour | Alfred C Morgan | | 8.9 | +4.1 |
| Labour | Kei'h Warren | | | |
| Majority | | | 36.4 | −12.0 |
| Turnout | | | 47.9 | −2.6 |
| Conservative hold | | Swing | -6.0 | |

Orpington Central (2)
| Party | Candidate | Votes | % | ±% |
|---|---|---|---|---|
| Liberal | Christopher Stewart Maines | 1,617 | 43.3 | +4.2 |
| Liberal | Michael John Norris | 1,535 | | |
| Conservative | Anthony M Owen | 1,242 | 33.3 | −16.7 |
| Conservative | Robert G Straker | 1,123 | | |
| Labour | Gillian A Collins | | 21.5 | +8.7 |
| Labour | Keith A Galley | | | |
| Independent | Elridge Griffiths | | 1.8 | |
| Majority | | | 10.0 | 18.9 |
| Turnout | | | 49.7 | +0.1 |
| Liberal gain from Conservative | | Swing | +9.4 | |

Petts Wood & Knoll (3)
| Party | Candidate | Votes | % | ±% |
|---|---|---|---|---|
| Conservative | Joan Hatcher* | | 58.0 | −10.6 |
| Conservative | Michael J Edwards* | | | |
| Conservative | Brian V Atkinson* | | | |
| Liberal | Aubrey James Curry | | 32.8 | +13.5 |
| SDP | Beatrice W Hedley | | | |
| Liberal | John A Martin | | | |
| Labour | Rosalie Huzzard | | 9.2 | +5.1 |
| Labour | Lynn Ann Sellwood | | | |
| Labour | Susan Ann Polydorou | | | |
| Majority | | | 25.2 | +9.4 |
| Turnout | | | 51.4 | −2.2 |
| Conservative hold | | Swing | +4.6 | |

St Mary Cray (3)
| Party | Candidate | Votes | % | ±% |
|---|---|---|---|---|
| Labour | John Richard Holbrook | 1,896 | 37.6 | +4.3 |
| Labour | Ronald William Huzzard | 1,878 | | |
| Labour | Mark J Smith | 1,774 | | |
| Liberal | Richard J Gardner | 1,617 | 32.1 | +4.5 |
| Conservative | Norman F Mingay* | 1,527 | 30.3 | −8.7 |
| Liberal | Martin Alan Curry | 1,475 | | |
| Conservative | Harry R Stranger* | 1,463 | | |
| Liberal | Duncan Keith Borrowman | 1,453 | | |
| Conservative | Martin R Reef | 1,413 | | |
| Majority | | | 5.5 | |
| Turnout | | | 44.5 | +2.4 |
| Labour gain from Conservative | | Swing | | |

=== Ravensbourne ===
Biggin Hill (2)
| Party | Candidate | Votes | % | ±% |
|---|---|---|---|---|
| Conservative | David Robert Haslam* | 1,881 | | |
| Conservative | Arthur Ronald Edgington | 1,837 | | |
| Liberal | Robert F Hatch | 1,468 | | |
| SDP | Joan E Welfare | 1,340 | | |
| Labour | Stuart N Copping | 361 | | |
| Labour | Joyce E Galley | 333 | | |
| Majority | | | | |
| Turnout | | | 47.1 | −5.0 |
| Conservative hold | | Swing | | |

Bromley Common & Keston (3)
| Party | Candidate | Votes | % | ±% |
|---|---|---|---|---|
| Liberal | Robert H Smith* | 2,475 | 42.6 | + |
| Conservative | Raymond L Ainsby* | 2,442 | 42.0 | −11.2 |
| Conservative | John Hawes | 2,361 | | |
| Liberal | Paul Jeremy Hudson Booth | 2,351 | | |
| SDP | Catherine Mary Boston | 2,298 | | |
| Conservative | Andrew D Clift | 2,264 | | |
| Labour | David R Blackman | | 15.4 | −6.3 |
| Labour | Geoffrey D Williams | | | |
| Labour | Pamela C Remon | | | |
| Majority | | | 28.1 | 28.7 |
| Turnout | | | 45.9 | +4.4 |
| Liberal gain from Conservative | | Swing | +14.3 | |

Darwin (1)
| Party | Candidate | Votes | % | ±% |
|---|---|---|---|---|
| Conservative | Peter John Bloomfield* | | 69.7 | +2.1 |
| Liberal | Derek J Goldsmith | | 22.1 | −3.7 |
| Labour | Martin E Synan | | 8.2 | +1.5 |
| Majority | | | 47.6 | +5.8 |
| Turnout | | | 50.3 | −6.3 |
| Conservative hold | | Swing | +2.95 | |

Hayes (3)
| Party | Candidate | Votes | % | ±% |
|---|---|---|---|---|
| Conservative | Ernest Dennis Barkway* | | 53.0 | −11.9 |
| Conservative | Philip Geoffrey Jones* | | | |
| Conservative | Nigel G Kelsh | | | |
| Liberal | William Ivor Shipley | | 36.3 | +8.3 |
| SDP | Richard J McKeogh | | | |
| SDP | Graham Frederick Keith Radford | | | |
| Labour | Peter W Rance | | 10.8 | +3.7 |
| Labour | Marcus R Shellard | | | |
| Labour | Peter R Adamczyk-Haswell | | | |
| Majority | | | 16.7 | −20.2 |
| Turnout | | | 46.5 | +2.2 |
| Conservative hold | | Swing | -10.1 | |

Martins Hill & Town (2)
| Party | Candidate | Votes | % | ±% |
|---|---|---|---|---|
| Conservative | William F D Walker* | | 48.6 | −4.9 |
| Conservative | Anthony Millar Wilkinson* | | | |
| Liberal | Jennifer M Hawke | | 35.9 | +1.5 |
| SDP | Roger Wakefield | | | |
| Labour | Alton S Kelly | | 15.6 | +3.5 |
| Labour | Gordon Thomas Yates | | | |
| Majority | | | 12.7 | −6.3 |
| Turnout | | | 38.6 | −4.8 |
| Conservative hold | | Swing | -3.1 | |

West Wickham North (2)
| Party | Candidate | Votes | % | ±% |
|---|---|---|---|---|
| Conservative | Montague I Blasey* | | 56.9 | −10.9 |
| Conservative | Brian Charles Humphrys | | | |
| SDP | Richard J Cox | | 35.0 | +10.7 |
| Liberal | Peter N F Ward | | | |
| Labour | Frank P Atkinson | | 8.1 | +0.2 |
| Labour | Leslie G Druce | | | |
| Majority | | | 21.9 | −21.6 |
| Turnout | | | 47.6 | −0.7 |
| Conservative hold | | Swing | -10.8 | |

West Wickham South (2)
| Party | Candidate | Votes | % | ±% |
|---|---|---|---|---|
| Conservative | Kenneth V Crask* | | 56.9 | −10.5 |
| Conservative | John Frederick Ivan Gray | | | |
| SDP | Richard Henry Redden | | 35.0 | +7.0 |
| Liberal | Irene B Jenkins | | | |
| Labour | Richard Richards | | 8.1 | +2.3 |
| Labour | Gordon D Wright | | | |
| Majority | | | 21.9 | −24.7 |
| Turnout | | | 47.3 | −1.0 |
| Conservative hold | | Swing | -12.3 | |
