= 1978 Bromley London Borough Council election =

1978 local election in England

The 1978 Bromley Borough Council election took place on 4 May 1978 to elect members of Bromley London Borough Council in London, England. The whole council was up for election and the Conservative Party stayed in overall control of the council.

== Ward results ==
=== Beckenham ===
Anerley (2)
Party	test	Votes	%	±%
Labour	Christopher Richard Gaster	1,446	27.1	
Labour	Paul Brown	1,388	26.0	
Conservative	Graham Paull	849	15.9	
Conservative	Roland Lees	847	15.9	
Liberal	Nicholas Gardner	243	4.6	
National Front	Geoffrey John Parker	189	3.5	
National Front	Michael Ingrams	182	3.4	
Liberal	Charles Vassie	172	3.2	

Clock House (2)
Party	Candidate	Votes	%	±%
Conservative	David J Harding		44.0	
Conservative	Terence Stanley	1,744		
Labour	Amanda Moore	1,461	35.3	n/a
Labour	Ian M Haig			
Liberal	Heather Isabel Donovan	676	16.3	n/a
Liberal	Stephen J Marshall			
National Front	Helen James	137	3.3	n/a
National Front	Stephen J Dickson			
Ecology	Helen M Vernon	43	1.0	n/a
Majority			8.7	n/a
Turnout			50.3	n/a
Conservative win (new seat)				

Copers Cope (2)
Party	Candidate	Votes	%	±%
Conservative	John L Pritchard*		74.6	
Conservative	Charles George Priest*	1590		
Labour	Gareth B Matthewson	307	14.2	n/a
Labour	Eric H Turner	249		
Liberal	Gillian Taylor	242	11.2	n/a
Liberal	Dorothy E Walsh			
Majority			60.4	n/a
Turnout			39.7	n/a
Conservative win (new seat)				

Eden Park (2)
Party	Candidate	Votes	%	±%
Conservative	Francis J D Cooke*		65.9	
Conservative	Peter F Dixon			
Liberal	Derek G Brent	570	17.2	n/a
Labour	Richard Richards	560	16.9	n/a
Labour	David N P Radlett			
Liberal	Nicholas Daniel McPhail Smith			
Majority			48.8	n/a
Turnout			45.8	n/a
Conservative win (new seat)				

Kelsey Park (2)
Party	Candidate	Votes	%	±%
Conservative	Maurice J Mason*		78.1	n/a
Conservative	Michael John B Tickner			
Liberal	Paul F Taylor		13.9	n/a
Liberal	Leslie E Brent			
Labour	Michael A Keenoy		8.0	n/a
Labour	William J Kocher			
Majority			64.2	n/a
Turnout			45.4	n/a
Conservative win (new seat)				

Lawrie Park & Kent House (2)
Party	Candidate	Votes	%	±%
Conservative	Richard D Foister*		56.9	
Conservative	John Arthur M. Lewis			
Labour	Ms J Ambrose		36.4	
Labour	R Balfe			
Liberal	Ms L Craig		6.7	
Liberal	Ms S Crookes			

Penge (2)
Party	Candidate	Votes	%	±%
Labour	Arthur J Mansfield*		51.5	n/a
Labour	Barbara Pedley*			
Conservative	Christopher John Elgar		33.3	n/a
Conservative	Michael Green			
Liberal	Joyce M Gardner		5.8	n/a
Independent	Patrick J S Millea		5.4	n/a
Liberal	Henry A Verlander			
National Front	Alfred Waite		4.1	n/a
National Front	Nigel Vernon Dickson			
Majority			18.1	n/a
Turnout			36.8	n/a
Labour win (new seat)				

Shortlands (2)
Party	Candidate	Votes	%	±%
Conservative	Bernard E G Davies*		82.2	n/a
Conservative	Brian R Reading			
Labour	Pauline M Jones	293	9.2	n/a
Liberal	Gareth Hughes	272	8.6	n/a
Liberal	Theresa M Radlett			
Labour	Dr Jan Pollert			
Majority			73.0	n/a
Turnout			44.5	n/a
Conservative win (new seat)				

=== Chislehurst ===
Bickley (3)
Party	Candidate	Votes	%	±%
Conservative	Maurice Bentley Kenward*		76.9	n/a
Conservative	Hector McDonald*			
Conservative	Simon J C Randall*			
Labour	Gwendoline I Mansfield		12.5	n/a
Labour	Audrey I Bridle			
Labour	William P J Pinder			
Liberal	Peter Graham Hardie-Bick		10.6	n/a
Liberal	Paul David A Nash			
Liberal	Barbara J Anderson-Stone			
Majority			64.4	n/a
Turnout			45.5	n/a
Conservative win (new seat)				

Chislehurst (3)
Party	Candidate	Votes	%	±%
Conservative	Joan Bryant		75.5	n/a
Conservative	Edward Myatt			
Conservative	Charles Christopher Seward Reeves			
Labour	Harold Taylor		15.4	n/a
Labour	Martyn G Jenkins			
Labour	Anthony W Paveley			
Liberal	Barry C Hesketh		9.1	n/a
Liberal	Olwen M Wade-Jones			
Liberal	Stephen R Walls			
Majority			60.2	n/a
Turnout			50.6	n/a
Conservative win (new seat)				

Mottingham (2)
Party	Candidate	Votes	%	±%
Labour	Alistair Huistean Macdonald*		64.0	n/a
Labour	Ronald W Huzzard*			
Conservative	Paul Martin Bonter		28.3	n/a
Conservative	Albert E Stayte			
Liberal	Susan E Robson		4.0	n/a
Liberal	Susanne G Levy			
National Front	Gwendoline F Dickson		3.8	n/a
National Front	Richard V Dickson			
Majority			35.7	n/a
Turnout			50.6	n/a
Labour win (new seat)				

Plaistow & Sundridge (3)
Party	Candidate	Votes	%	±%
Conservative	Richard B Jackson*		59.8	n/a
Conservative	Dorothy Joan Laird			
Conservative	Arthur J Wilkinson*			
Labour	Stephen Nortcliff		30.9	n/a
Labour	John Francis Spellar			
Labour	Judith E Armstrong			
Liberal	John R Hassall		9.3	n/a
Liberal	Nora MacMurray			
Liberal	Frank Deves			
Majority			29.0	n/a
Turnout			44.1	n/a
Conservative win (new seat)				

St Paul's Cray (3)
Party	Candidate	Votes	%	±%
Labour	Raymond A Sanderson		61.8	n/a
Labour	Walter K Mansfield			
Labour	Edgar C H Smith*			
Conservative	Violet C Hammond		31.9	n/a
Conservative	Geoffrey H Fennell			
Conservative	Gladys P Hobbs			
Liberal	George H Watson		6.3	n/a
Liberal	Ivor W Fyfe			
Liberal	Peter Alan Janikoun			
Majority			29.9	n/a
Turnout			39.0	n/a
Labour win (new seat)				

=== Orpington ===
Biggin Hill (2)
Party	Candidate	Votes	%	±%
Conservative	David W Hanscomb		63.7	n/a
Conservative	David Robert Haslam			
Liberal	Malcolm Bruce Westbrook	609	18.4	n/a
Labour	Roy E Hodsdon	592	17.9	n/a
Liberal	Cheryl E Carter			
Labour	James Duncan			
Majority			45.2	n/a
Turnout			48.6	n/a
Conservative win (new seat)				

Chelsfield & Goddington (3)
Party	Candidate	Votes	%	±%
Conservative	Brian V Atkinson	3,811	67.4	n/a
Conservative	Reginald G Adams	3,798		
Conservative	Joseph T Heath	3,761		
Liberal	Graham Leslie Arthur	1,184	20.9	n/a
Liberal	Sidney C O Langford	1,156		
Liberal	William S Lomax	1,153		
Labour	Dennis J Davenport	661	11.7	n/a
Labour	Mary A Tozer	654		
Labour	Keith Aubrey Galley	614		
Majority			46.4	n/a
Turnout			50.6	n/a
Conservative win (new seat)				

Crofton (2)
Party	Candidate	Votes	%	±%
Conservative	Keith G Grieve		67.2	n/a
Conservative	David A Heron*			
Liberal	Keith O Challis		22.9	n/a
Liberal	Dr Sandra E Ward			
Labour	Philip R Edwards		9.9	n/a
Labour	Ralph E Hunte			
Majority			44.3	n/a
Turnout			53.2	n/a
Conservative win (new seat)				

Darwin (1)
Party	Candidate	Votes	%	±%
Conservative	Anthony Peter Komedera		73.9	n/a
Liberal	Patrick McNally		15.1	n/a
Labour	John E Goffee		11.0	n/a
Majority			58.8	n/a
Turnout			53.6	n/a
Conservative win (new seat)				

Farnborough (2)
Party	Candidate	Votes	%	±%
Conservative	Eric Norman Goodman		76.9	n/a
Conservative	Jennifer Mary Hillier			
Liberal	Roy T Hawkins		11.9	n/a
Liberal	Philip F Dearle			
Labour	John Fowler		11.2	n/a
Labour	Celia Nortcliff			
Majority			65.0	n/a
Turnout			50.7	n/a
Conservative win (new seat)				

Orpington Central (2)
Party	Candidate	Votes	%	±%
Conservative	Michael A Minter		50.0	n/a
Conservative	Judith Jones			
Labour	Catherine Spillane		27.8	n/a
Labour	Nigel C Turnbull			
Liberal	Byrom Lees		22.2	n/a
Liberal	James R E Richard			
Majority			22.1	n/a
Turnout			45.6	n/a
Conservative win (new seat)				

Petts Wood & Knoll (3)
Party	Candidate	Votes	%	±%
Conservative	Alan S Cornish		68.6	n/a
Conservative	Joan Hatcher			
Conservative	Don D S Adams			
Liberal	David R Clark		21.2	n/a
Liberal	Christopher S Wilson			
Liberal	Robert G Street			
Labour	Keith S C Good		10.2	n/a
Labour	Ann Grant			
Labour	Maria Sawczenko			
Majority			47.4	n/a
Turnout			53.8	n/a
Conservative win (new seat)				

St Mary Cray (3)
Party	Candidate	Votes	%	±%
Labour	Doris Partridge*		49.1	n/a
Labour	David I Grant			
Labour	Keith R Morton	1,961		
Conservative	Anthea M Sargeant	1,859	42.4	n/a
Conservative	Martin T Fuller			
Conservative	Andrew D Crift			
Liberal	Michael Foy Tapsfield		8.5	n/a
Liberal	Terence Frank Clark			
Liberal	Stephen Long			
Majority			6.7	n/a
Turnout			42.1	n/a
Labour win (new seat)				

=== Ravensbourne ===
Bromley Common & Keston (3)
Party	Candidate	Votes	%	±%
Conservative	Clive A L Brangwin		55.3	n/a
Conservative	Raymond L Ainsby			
Conservative	Russell L Mellor			
Labour	John Richard Holbrook		34.5	n/a
Labour	Naomi V Carter			
Labour	Geoffrey J Ball			
Liberal	Joan Coverson		6.4	n/a
Liberal	Barbara J Walmsley			
Liberal	Dorothy E Richmond			
National Front	George V Askew		3.8	n/a
National Front	Roy E J Bond			
National Front	Jillian F Bond			
Majority			20.9	n/a
Turnout			42.4	n/a
Conservative win (new seat)				

Hayes (3)
Party	Candidate	Votes	%	±%
Conservative	James F David*		74.6	n/a
Conservative	Ernest Dennis Barkway*			
Conservative	Philip Geoffrey Jones			
Labour	Peter W Rance		13.7	n/a
Labour	Sylvia C Snipp			
Labour	Penelope A Kocher			
Liberal	Ronald Coverson		11.7	n/a
Liberal	Patricia D Ebden			
Liberal	Colin P England			
Majority			60.9	n/a
Turnout			40.8	n/a
Conservative win (new seat)				

Martins Hill & Town (2)
Party	Candidate	Votes	%	±%
Conservative	William F D Walker*		64.5	n/a
Conservative	Anthony M Wilkinson*			
Labour	Alan M Pickering		25.2	n/a
Labour	Gordon Thomas Yates			
Liberal	Philip E Dewdney		10.2	n/a
Liberal	Margaret E Birchmore			
Majority			39.3	n/a
Turnout			37.1	n/a
Conservative win (new seat)				

West Wickham North (2)
Party	Candidate	Votes	%	±%
Conservative	Montague I Blasey*		77.6	n/a
Conservative	Percy C Read*			
Labour	Robert Armstrong		12.9	n/a
Labour	Colin P Moore			
Liberal	Peter A Dodsworth		9.5	n/a
Liberal	Christine Oakenfull			
Majority			64.7	n/a
Turnout			45.2	n/a
Conservative win (new seat)				

West Wickham South (2)
Party	Candidate	Votes	%	±%
Conservative	Kenneth V Crask*		75.0	n/a
Conservative	Leslie G Whitman			
Labour	Richard J Cox		16.8	n/a
Labour	Richard Henry Redden			
Liberal	Alan G Sewell		8.2	
Liberal	John C Standley			
Majority			58.1	n/a
Turnout			46.4	n/a
Conservative win (new seat)				
