= 2010 Bromley London Borough Council election =

2010 local election in England

2010 Bromley Borough Council election
- 6 May 2010

All 60 seats to Bromley London Borough Council 31 seats needed for a majority
	First party	Second party	Third party
Party	Conservative	Liberal Democrats	Labour
Last election	49 seats, 54.1%	7 seats, 25.6%	4 seats, 12.3%
Seats won	53	4	3
Seat change	▲4	▼3	▼1
Popular vote	82,368	41,170	25,849
Percentage	49.3%	24.6%	15.5%
Swing	▼4.8%	▼1.0%	▲3.2%
- Map of the results of the 2010 Bromley council election. Conservatives in blue, Labour in red and Liberal Democrats in yellow.
Council control before election
Conservative
Council control after election
Conservative

Elections for Bromley Council were held on 6 May 2010. The 2010 General Election and other local elections took place on the same day.

In London council elections the entire council is elected every four years, whereas in some local elections one councillor is elected every year for two or three of the four years.

== Results ==
Bromley Council election result 2010
Party	Seats	Gains	Losses	Net gain/loss	Seats %	Votes %	Votes	+/−
Conservative	53	4	0	▲4	88.3	49.3	82,368	▼4.8
Liberal Democrats	4	0	3	▼3	6.7	24.6	41,170	▼1.0
Labour	3	0	1	▼1	5.0	15.5	25,849	▲3.2
Green	0	0	0	Steady	0.0	4.0	6,726	▲0.4
UKIP	0	0	0	Steady	0.0	3.7	6,181	▲3.3
Independent	0	0	0	Steady	0.0	1.1	1,814	▼1.6
BNP	0	0	0	Steady	0.0	1.0	1,739	▼0.3
Independents to Save Queen Mary's Hospital	0	0	0	Steady	0.0	0.8	1,371	New

== Ward results ==
=== Bickley ===
Bickley (3)
Party	Candidate	Votes	%	±%
Conservative	Katherine Lymer	4,970	59.4	
Conservative	Catherine Rideout	4,953	59.2	
Conservative	Colin Smith	4,556	54.4	
Liberal Democrats	Brian Taylor	1,637	19.6	
Liberal Democrats	Victoria Wye	1,515	18.1	
Liberal Democrats	Patricia Bignell	1,299	15.5	
Labour	Arthur Johnson	915	10.9	
Labour	Velma Campbell	914	10.9	
Labour	Christopher Clough	897	10.7	
UKIP	John Bailey	612	7.3	
Green	Roisin Robertson	606	7.2	
Turnout		8,369	71.0	
Conservative hold		Swing		
Conservative hold		Swing		
Conservative hold		Swing		

=== Biggin Hill ===
Biggin Hill (2)
Party	Candidate	Votes	%	±%
Conservative	Gordon Norrie	2,855	51.0	
Conservative	Julian Benington	2,679	47.9	
Liberal Democrats	Geoffrey Gostt	1,769	31.6	
Liberal Democrats	Walter Shekyls	1,552	27.7	
UKIP	Christopher Greenhough	467	8.3	
BNP	Michael Payne	390	7.0	
Labour	Jeannette Carter	345	6.2	
Labour	Keith Galley	344	6.2	
Turnout		5,593	70.6	
Conservative hold		Swing		
Conservative hold		Swing		

=== Bromley Common and Keston ===
Bromley Common and Keston (3)
Party	Candidate	Votes	%	±%
Conservative	Alexa Michael	4,111	53.2	
Conservative	Stephen Carr	4,099	53.0	
Conservative	Ruth Bennett	4,098	53.0	
Liberal Democrats	Rosemary Oliver	1,644	21.3	
Liberal Democrats	Jeremy Cope	1,490	19.3	
Liberal Democrats	Roy Southgate	1,347	17.4	
Labour	Colin Clary	1,023	13.2	
Labour	Kelly Galvin	941	12.2	
Labour	Tom Odoki-Olam	782	10.1	
UKIP	Owen Brolly	777	10.0	
Turnout		7,734	67.6	
Conservative hold		Swing		
Conservative hold		Swing		
Conservative hold		Swing		

=== Bromley Town ===
Bromley Town (3)
Party	Candidate	Votes	%	±%
Conservative	William Harmer	3,816	45.1	
Conservative	David Hastings	3,784	44.7	
Conservative	Diana MacMull	3,359	39.7	
Liberal Democrats	Sheila Blackburn	2,059	24.3	
Liberal Democrats	Martin Cooper	1,897	22.4	
Labour	Robert Armstrong	1,826	21.6	
Liberal Democrats	Jennifer Hawke	1,755	20.7	
Labour	Michael Gibson	1,686	19.9	
Labour	Marcus Oliver	1,527	18.0	
Green	Ann Garrett	877	10.4	
UKIP	Emmett Jenner	612	7.2	
Turnout		8,467	66.7	
Conservative hold		Swing		
Conservative hold		Swing		
Conservative hold		Swing		

=== Chelsfield and Pratts Bottom ===
Chelsfield and Pratts Bottom (3)
Party	Candidate	Votes	%	±%
Conservative	Julian Grainger	4,915	57.7	
Conservative	Samaris Huntington-Thresher	4,505	52.9	
Conservative	Russell Jackson	4,449	52.3	
Liberal Democrats	Keith Challis	2,485	29.2	
Liberal Democrats	Oliver Loosemore	2,483	29.2	
Liberal Democrats	James Whiteside	2,314	27.2	
Labour	Gillian Collins	784	9.2	
Labour	Christopher Purnell	743	8.7	
Labour	Aline Evans	628	7.4	
Turnout		8,511	72.4	
Conservative hold		Swing		
Conservative hold		Swing		
Conservative hold		Swing		

=== Chislehurst ===
Chislehurst (3)
Party	Candidate	Votes	%	±%
Conservative	Kathleen Boughey	4,935	58.9	
Conservative	Eric Bosshard	4,800	57.3	
Conservative	Ian Payne	3,947	47.1	
Liberal Democrats	Thomas Gault	1,639	19.5	
Liberal Democrats	Colin England	1,421	16.9	
Independents to Save Queen Mary's Hospital	John Hemming-Clark	1,371	16.4	
Liberal Democrats	Ian Magrath	1,327	15.8	
Labour	Christian Mole	796	9.5	
Labour	Stuart Reid	746	8.9	
Green	Nicholas Hadziannis	515	6.1	
Labour	Gareth Wretham	480	5.7	
Green	Frances Speed	455	5.4	
Turnout		8,384	71.1	
Conservative hold		Swing		
Conservative hold		Swing		
Conservative hold		Swing		

=== Clock House ===
Clock House (3)
Party	Candidate	Votes	%	±%
Conservative	Sarah Phillips	2,817	34.9	
Conservative	Nicholas Milner	2,578	31.9	
Liberal Democrats	Reginald Adams	2,564	31.8	
Conservative	David Jefferys	2,469	30.6	
Labour	Vanessa Allen	2,200	27.3	
Liberal Democrats	Paul Nash	2,167	26.8	
Liberal Democrats	Jonathan Burns	2,134	26.4	
Labour	Kevin Brooks	1,815	22.5	
Labour	Richard Hart	1,557	19.3	
UKIP	Graham Chamberlain	536	6.6	
Green	Margaret Toomey	529	6.6	
Green	Adam Shahin	416	5.2	
Green	Rosanna Cavallo	393	4.9	
Turnout		8,072	69.1	
Conservative gain from Liberal Democrats		Swing		
Conservative hold		Swing		
Liberal Democrats hold		Swing		

=== Copers Cope ===
Copers Cope (3)
Party	Candidate	Votes	%	±%
Conservative	Russell Mellor	4,289	51.5	
Conservative	Michael Tickner	4,267	51.3	
Conservative	Stephen Wells	4,267	51.3	
Liberal Democrats	Kay Stocker	2,138	25.7	
Liberal Democrats	Heather Donovan	2,027	24.4	
Liberal Democrats	Patricia Weal	1,889	22.7	
Labour	Patricia Mansfield	1,381	16.6	
Labour	Catherine Milton	1,325	15.9	
Labour	Belinda Price	1,250	15.0	
Turnout		8,321	67.4	
Conservative hold		Swing		
Conservative hold		Swing		
Conservative hold		Swing		

=== Cray Valley East ===
Cray Valley East (3)
Party	Candidate	Votes	%	±%
Conservative	Peter Fortune	2,568	39.5	
Liberal Democrats	David McBride	2,504	38.5	
Conservative	Roxhannah Fawthrop	2,280	35.0	
Liberal Democrats	Martin Curry	2,238	34.4	
Liberal Democrats	Brenda Thompson	2,121	32.6	
Conservative	Lalit Khanna	1,996	30.7	
Labour	Nathaniel Arthur	1,050	16.1	
Labour	Stephanie Godbold	945	14.5	
Labour	Mohammed Zaman	817	12.6	
BNP	Mary Culnane	659	10.1	
Turnout		6,507	59.0	
Conservative gain from Liberal Democrats		Swing		
Liberal Democrats hold		Swing		
Conservative gain from Liberal Democrats		Swing		

=== Cray Valley West ===
Cray Valley West (3)
Party	Candidate	Votes	%	±%
Conservative	Judith Ellis	2,745	38.7	
Conservative	John Ince	2,596	36.6	
Conservative	Harry Stranger	2,372	33.5	
Liberal Democrats	Michael Bignell	1,911	27.0	
Liberal Democrats	Stephen Jenkins	1,655	23.4	
Liberal Democrats	Sam Webber	1,570	22.2	
Labour	Paul Davies	1,239	17.5	
Labour	Sharon Wheeler	1,236	17.4	
Labour	Karen Roberts	1,194	16.9	
UKIP	Sheila Allen	796	11.2	
BNP	Roger Tonks	690	9.7	
Independent	Susan Gibbens	519	7.3	
Independent	John Gibbens	495	7.0	
Independent	Andrew Senft	432	6.1	
Turnout		7,086	58.9	
Conservative gain from Labour		Swing		
Conservative hold		Swing		
Conservative hold		Swing		

=== Crystal Palace ===
Crystal Palace (2)
Party	Candidate	Votes	%	±%
Liberal Democrats	John Canvin	2,167	42.3	
Liberal Democrats	Thomas Papworth	1,886	36.8	
Labour	Joshua King	1,668	32.6	
Labour	Allison Roche	1,425	27.8	
Conservative	Paul Durling	899	17.6	
Conservative	Karen Moran	822	16.1	
Green	Maureen Leary	377	7.4	
Green	Lisa Mutti	283	5.5	
Turnout		5,120	59.1	
Liberal Democrats hold		Swing		
Liberal Democrats hold		Swing		

=== Darwin ===
Darwin (1)
Party	Candidate	Votes	%	±%
Conservative	Richard Scoates	1,362	46.1	
Independent	Peter Bloomfield	1,295	43.8	
UKIP	James Greenhough	299	10.1	
Turnout		3,001	73.9	
Conservative hold		Swing		

=== Farnborough and Crofton ===
Farnborough and Crofton (3)
Party	Candidate	Votes	%	±%
Conservative	Charles Joel	5,067	58.3	
Conservative	Robert Evans	5,000	57.5	
Conservative	Timothy Stevens	4,791	55.1	
Liberal Democrats	Helen Rabbatts	2,139	24.6	
Liberal Democrats	Charles Powell	2,134	24.5	
Liberal Democrats	Harry Silvester	1,944	22.4	
UKIP	Christine Diamond	726	8.3	
Labour	Bryan Gay	656	7.5	
Labour	Andrew Amos	629	7.2	
Labour	Christopher Taylor	627	7.2	
Turnout		8,695	75.5	
Conservative hold		Swing		
Conservative hold		Swing		
Conservative hold		Swing		

=== Hayes and Coney Hall ===
Hayes and Coney Hall (3)
Party	Candidate	Votes	%	±%
Conservative	Thelma Manning	5,549	61.3	
Conservative	Graham Arthur	5,250	58.0	
Conservative	Neil Reddin	4,893	54.1	
Liberal Democrats	Owen Griffiths	1,990	22.0	
Liberal Democrats	Steven Daniell	1,648	18.2	
Liberal Democrats	Sonia Whitaker	1,428	15.8	
Labour	Katharine Head	1,182	13.1	
Labour	John Parke	1,005	11.1	
Labour	Richard Watts	812	9.0	
Green	John Reber	769	8.5	
Turnout		9,052	72.7	
Conservative hold		Swing		
Conservative hold		Swing		
Conservative hold		Swing		

=== Kelsey and Eden Park ===
Kelsey and Eden Park (3)
Party	Candidate	Votes	%	±%
Conservative	Paul Lynch	4,827	55.6	
Conservative	Peter Dean	4,658	53.7	
Conservative	Diane Smith	4,586	52.9	
Liberal Democrats	Oliver Tuhey	2,067	23.8	
Liberal Democrats	Alan Carter	2,020	23.3	
Liberal Democrats	Michael Caine	1,869	21.5	
Labour	Alan Burn	1,396	16.1	
Labour	John Dempster	1,352	15.6	
Labour	Sandie Albery	1,253	14.4	
Turnout		8,677	71.7	
Conservative hold		Swing		
Conservative hold		Swing		
Conservative hold		Swing		

=== Mottingham and Chislehurst North ===
Mottingham and Chislehurst North (2)
Party	Candidate	Votes	%	±%
Conservative	Roger Charsley	2,229	49.1	
Conservative	Charles Rideout	1,914	42.1	
Labour	Judith Armstrong	1,061	23.4	
Labour	Ian Horrigan	969	21.3	
Liberal Democrats	John Houghton	836	18.4	
Liberal Democrats	Jane Coyte	812	17.9	
Green	Zoe Mercer	320	7.0	
Turnout		4,541	61.1	
Conservative hold		Swing		
Conservative hold		Swing		

=== Orpington ===
Orpington (3)
Party	Candidate	Votes	%	±%
Conservative	William Huntington-Thresher	4,055	49.5	
Conservative	Pauline Tunnicliffe	3,990	48.7	
Conservative	Lydia Buttinger	3,954	48.3	
Liberal Democrats	Michael Hall	2,802	34.2	
Liberal Democrats	Nigel Taylor	2,460	30.0	
Liberal Democrats	Gerda Loosemore-Reppen	2,408	29.4	
Labour	Christopher Price	818	10.0	
Labour	Patrick Collins	781	9.5	
Labour	Mohammed Bhuiyan	664	8.1	
Green	Tamara Galloway	495	6.0	
Turnout		8,187	69.2	
Conservative hold		Swing		
Conservative hold		Swing		
Conservative hold		Swing		

=== Penge and Cator ===
Penge and Cator (3)
Party	Candidate	Votes	%	±%
Labour	John Getgood	3,300	41.9	
Labour	Katherine Bance	3,272	41.5	
Labour	Peter Fookes	3,229	41.0	
Conservative	Christopher Phillips	2,484	31.5	
Liberal Democrats	Victoria Papworth	2,453	31.1	
Liberal Democrats	Douglas Rathbone	2,183	27.7	
Liberal Democrats	Joanna van der Meer	2,088	26.5	
Conservative	Akudo Ike	1,580	20.0	
Conservative	Mark Slawinski	1,466	18.6	
Turnout		7,885	65.4	
Labour hold		Swing		
Labour hold		Swing		
Labour hold		Swing		

=== Petts Wood and Knoll ===
Petts Wood and Knoll (3)
Party	Candidate	Votes	%	±%
Conservative	Douglas Auld	5,197	60.5	
Conservative	Anthony Owen	5,112	59.5	
Conservative	Simon Fawthrop	4,667	54.3	
Liberal Democrats	Robert Anthony	1,904	22.2	
Liberal Democrats	Grace Goodlad	1,903	22.1	
Liberal Democrats	James Thompson	1,687	19.6	
Labour	Frank Evans	679	7.9	
Labour	Malcolm Barker	641	7.5	
UKIP	James Spurrell	635	7.4	
Green	Martin Childs	632	7.4	
Labour	Peter Tozer	522	6.1	
Turnout		8,594	78.1	
Conservative hold		Swing		
Conservative hold		Swing		
Conservative hold		Swing		

=== Plaistow and Sundridge ===
Plaistow and Sundridge (3)
Party	Candidate	Votes	%	±%
Conservative	Eleanor Harmer	3,562	45.1	
Conservative	Peter Morgan	3,538	44.8	
Conservative	Michael Turner	3,381	42.9	
Liberal Democrats	Nicholas Comrie	1,952	24.7	
Liberal Democrats	Peter Furniss	1,932	24.5	
Liberal Democrats	David Pike	1,716	21.7	
Labour	Elizabeth Johnstone	1,455	18.4	
Labour	Julian Richards	1,330	16.9	
Labour	George Johnstone	1,257	15.9	
UKIP	Lindsay Clayton	721	9.1	
Green	John Street	696	8.8	
Turnout		7,890	67.7	
Conservative hold		Swing		
Conservative hold		Swing		
Conservative hold		Swing		

=== Shortlands ===
Shortlands (2)
Party	Candidate	Votes	%	±%
Conservative	Ernest Noad	3,629	64.5	
Conservative	George Taylor	2,986	53.0	
Green	Anna James	910	16.2	
Labour	Gareth Abbit	892	15.8	
Liberal Democrats	Jane Connor	835	14.8	
Liberal Democrats	Peter Ayres	767	13.6	
Labour	Isabella Leslie	428	7.6	
Turnout		5,629	73.4	
Conservative hold		Swing		
Conservative hold		Swing		

=== West Wickham ===
West Wickham (3)
Party	Candidate	Votes	%	±%
Conservative	Jane Beckley	5,487	62.2	
Conservative	Brian Humphrys	5,364	60.8	
Conservative	Nicholas Bennett	5,045	57.2	
Liberal Democrats	Chantal Lane	1,675	19.0	
Liberal Democrats	Graham Radford	1,518	17.2	
Liberal Democrats	Helen Crowe	1,504	17.0	
Labour	Gary Kent	1,183	13.4	
Labour	Hazel Dunford	1,165	13.2	
Labour	Richard Williams	818	9.3	
Turnout		8,823	75.5	
Conservative hold		Swing		
Conservative hold		Swing		
Conservative hold		Swing		
