= Biggin Hill (ward) =

Electoral ward in London, England

- Electoral ward for the Bromley London Borough Council
- Biggin Hill ward boundaries since 2022
- Borough: Bromley
- County: Greater London
- Population: 10,817 (2021) (Note: 2021 Census data reported for 2022 ward boundaries)
- Electorate: 8,455 (2022)
- Major settlements: Biggin Hill
- Area: 8.638 square kilometres (3.335 sq mi)

Current electoral ward
- Created: 1965
- Number of members: 2
- Councillors: Steve James; Tim Allitt
- GSS code: E05000107 (2002–2022); E05013989 (2022–present)

Biggin Hill is an electoral ward in the London Borough of Bromley. The ward was first used in the 1964 elections and elects two councillors to Bromley London Borough Council.

== List of councillors ==
Seat	Councillor	Took office	Left office	Party	Election
1	Derek Saunders	1964	1978	Conservative	1964 ... 1974
2	Marjorie McClure	1964	1975	Conservative	1964 ... 1974
2	Michael Hughes	1975	1978	Conservative	1975
1	David Hanscomb	1978	1986	Conservative	1978, 1982
2	David Haslam	1978	1994	Conservative	1978 ... 1990
1	Arthur Edgington	1986	1994	Conservative	1986, 1990
1	Geoffrey Gostt	1994	2006	Liberal Democrats	1994, 1998, 2002
2	Walter Shekyls	1994	2006	Liberal Democrats	1994, 1998, 2002
1	Gordon Norrie	2006	2014	Independent	2006, 2010
2	Julian Benington	2006	2022	Independent	2006 ... 2018
1	Melanie Stevens	2014	2026	Independent	2014, 2018, 2022
2	Sophie Dunbar	2022	2026	Independent	2022
1	Steve James	2026	Incumbent	Reform	2026
2	Tim Allitt	2026	Incumbent	Reform	2026

== Summary ==
Councillors elected by party at each general borough election.

- Conservative
- Liberal Democrats
- Independent
- Reform

== Bromley council elections since 2022 ==
There was a revision of ward boundaries in Bromley in 2022.

=== 2026 election ===
The election took place on 7 May 2026.

2026 Bromley London Borough Council election: Biggin Hill (2)
Party	Candidate	Votes	%	±%
Reform	Steve James	2,122	47.4	New
Reform	Tim Allitt	2,119	47.3	New
Conservative	Sophie Dunbar	1,766	39.4	−2.4
Conservative	Philip Hatch	1,440	32.2	−1.6
Green	Geoff Allen	327	7.3	New
Liberal Democrats	Geoff Gostt	299	6.7	−4.7
Green	Laurence Hamilton	270	6.0	New
Labour	Steve Cranenburgh	230	5.1	−4.7
Liberal Democrats	Malcolm Westbrook	206	4.6	−3.5
Labour	Aji George	178	4.0	−3.3
Turnout		4,558	54.0	+17
Registered electors		8,447		
Reform gain from Independent		Swing		
Reform gain from Independent		Swing		

=== 2022 election ===
The election took place on 5 May 2022.

2022 Bromley London Borough Council election: Biggin Hill (2)
Party	Candidate	Votes	%	±%
Independent	Melanie Stevens	1,443	45.6	+8.8
Independent	Sophie Dunbar	1,323	41.8	+4.1
Conservative	Victoria Nightingale	1,136	35.9	+6.1
Conservative	Andrew King	1,069	33.8	+6.6
Liberal Democrats	Geoff Gosst	361	11.4	+0.6
Labour	Stephen Cranenburgh	311	9.8	+2.0
Liberal Democrats	Malcolm Westbrook	255	8.1	+2.6
Labour	Margaret Mills	232	7.3	+0.1
Turnout		3,165	37	−3
Registered electors		8,455		
Independent hold				
Independent hold				

== 2002–2022 Bromley council elections ==
Biggin Hill ward boundaries from 2002 to 2022

There was a revision of ward boundaries in Bromley in 2002.

=== 2018 election ===
The election took place on 3 May 2018.

2018 Bromley London Borough Council election: Biggin Hill (2)
Party	Candidate	Votes	%	±%
Independent	Julian Benington	1,175	37.7	New
Independent	Melanie Stevens	1,149	36.8	New
Conservative	Linda Hewitt	929	29.8	−21.2
Conservative	Toby Sims	848	27.2	−12.4
UKIP	Julian Grainger	360	11.5	New
Liberal Democrats	Geoff Gostt	336	10.8	−4.7
UKIP	Emmett Jenner	301	9.7	−26.9
Labour	Timothy Fisher	242	7.8	−1.9
Labour	Clive Gunby	224	7.2	+4.0
Green	Karen Wheller	205	6.6	−2.7
Green	Paul Enock	182	5.8	New
Liberal Democrats	Graeme Casey	171	5.5	−7.7
Turnout		6,122	40	
Registered electors		7,839		
Independent gain from Conservative				
Independent gain from Conservative				

=== 2014 election ===
The election took place on 22 May 2014.

2014 Bromley London Borough Council election: Biggin Hill (2)
Party	Candidate	Votes	%	±%
Conservative	Julian Benington	1,652	51.0	
Conservative	Melanie Stevens	1,282	39.6	
UKIP	Emmett Jenner	1,185	36.6	
Liberal Democrats	Geoffrey Gostt	501	15.5	
Liberal Democrats	Walter Shekyls	428	13.2	
Labour	Colin Savage	314	9.7	
Green	Lara Yates	300	9.3	
Labour	Michael Roberts	103	3.2	
Turnout		3241	41.42	
Conservative hold				
Conservative hold				

=== 2010 election ===
The election on 6 May 2010 took place on the same day as the United Kingdom general election.

2010 Bromley London Borough Council election: Biggin Hill (2)
Party	Candidate	Votes	%	±%
Conservative	Gordon Norrie	2,855	49.0	
Conservative	Julian Benington	2,679		
Liberal Democrats	Geoffrey Gostt	1,769	30.4	
Liberal Democrats	Walter Shekyls	1,552		
UKIP	Christopher Greenhough	467	8.0	
BNP	Michael Payne	390	6.7	
Labour	Jeannette Carter	345	5.9	
Labour	Keith Galley	344		
Turnout		5,593	70.6	
Conservative hold				
Conservative hold				

=== 2006 election ===
The election took place on 4 May 2006.

2006 Bromley London Borough Council election: Biggin Hill (2)
Party	Candidate	Votes	%	±%
Conservative	Gordon Norrie	1,708	51.9	
Conservative	Julian Benington	1,651		
Liberal Democrats	Geoffrey Gostt	1,476	44.8	
Liberal Democrats	Bob Shekyls	1,426		
Labour	Patrick Collins	107	3.3	
Labour	Christopher Price	107		
Turnout			43.2	
Conservative gain from Liberal Democrats				
Conservative gain from Liberal Democrats				

=== 2002 election ===
The election took place on 2 May 2002.

2002 Bromley London Borough Council election: Biggin Hill (2)
Party	Candidate	Votes	%	±%
Liberal Democrats	Geoffrey Gostt	1,432		
Liberal Democrats	Walter Shekyls	1,402		
Conservative	Gordon Norrie	1,139		
Conservative	Matthew Phipps	993		
UKIP	Arthur Holmans	132		
Labour	Keith Galley	124		
Labour	Brendan French	121		
Turnout		2,783	36.1	
Liberal Democrats win (new boundaries)				
Liberal Democrats win (new boundaries)				

== 1994–2002 Bromley council elections ==
The boundaries of the ward were adjusted on 1 April 1994.

=== 1998 election ===
The election on 7 May 1998 took place on the same day as the 1998 Greater London Authority referendum.

1998 Bromley London Borough Council election: Biggin Hill (2)
Party	Candidate	Votes	%	±%
Liberal Democrats	Geoffrey Gostt	1,830	51.13	▼1.05
Liberal Democrats	Walter Shekyls	1,742		
Conservative	David Haslam	1,481	40.75	▲0.95
Conservative	Christopher Wordingham	1,366		
Labour	Brendan French	284	8.12	▲0.11
Labour	Leonard Hall	283		
Registered electors		8,570		▲281
Turnout		3,691	43.07	▼6.16
Rejected ballots		8	0.22	▲0.10
Liberal Democrats hold				
Liberal Democrats hold				

=== 1994 election ===
The election took place on 5 May 1994.

1994 Bromley London Borough Council election: Biggin Hill (2)
Party	Candidate	Votes	%	±%
Liberal Democrats	Geoffrey Gostt	2,085	52.18	▲29.82
Liberal Democrats	Walter Shekyls	1,978		
Conservative	David Haslam	1,580	39.80	▼16.60
Conservative	John Cokayne	1,520		
Labour	Leonard Hall	327	8.01	▼8.81
Labour	Keith Galley	297		
Registered electors		8,289		▲106
Turnout		4,081	49.23	▲2.74
Rejected ballots		5	0.12	▼0.01
Liberal Democrats win (new boundaries)				
Liberal Democrats win (new boundaries)				

== 1978–1994 Bromley council elections ==
Biggin Hill ward boundaries from 1978 to 1994

There was a revision of ward boundaries in Bromley in 1978. Leaves Green was transferred to Darwin ward.

=== 1990 election ===
The election took place on 3 May 1990.

1990 Bromley London Borough Council election: Biggin Hill (2)
Party	Candidate	Votes	%
Conservative	David Haslam	2,092	56.40
Conservative	Arthur Edgington	2,066	
Liberal Democrats	Geoffrey Gostt	845	22.36
Lib Dem Focus Team	Robert Hatch	802	
Labour	Keith Galley	620	16.82
Labour	John Lewis	620	
SDP	Joan Welfare	163	4.42
Registered electors		8,183	
Turnout		3804	46.49
Rejected ballots		5	0.13
Conservative hold			
Conservative hold			

=== 1986 election ===
The election took place on 8 May 1986.

1986 Bromley London Borough Council election: Biggin Hill (2)
Party	Candidate	Votes	%	±%
Conservative	David Haslam	1,881		
Conservative	Arthur Edgington	1,837		
Liberal	Robert Hatch	1,468		
SDP	Joan Welfare	1,340		
Labour	Stuart Copping	361		
Labour	Joyce Galley	333		
Majority				
Turnout			47.1	−5.0
Conservative hold				
Conservative hold				

=== 1982 election ===
The election took place on 6 May 1982.

1982 Bromley London Borough Council election: Biggin Hill (2)
Party	Candidate	Votes	%	±%
Conservative	David Hanscomb	2,286	59.7	−4.0
Conservative	David Haslam	2,229		
Liberal	Malcolm Westbrook	1,235	32.3	+13.9
Liberal	Geoffrey Gostt	1,213		
Labour	Alison Sheldrake	308	8.0	−9.9
Labour	Mairede Thomas	299		
Majority			27.4	−17.8
Turnout			52.1	+3.5
Conservative hold				
Conservative hold				

=== 1978 election ===
The election took place on 4 May 1978.

1978 Bromley London Borough Council election: Biggin Hill (2)
Party	Candidate	Votes	%	±%
Conservative	David Hanscomb	2,104	63.7	n/a
Conservative	David Haslam	2,003		
Liberal	Malcolm Westbrook	609	18.4	n/a
Labour	Roy Hodsdon	592	17.9	n/a
Liberal	Cheryl Carter	541		
Labour	James Duncan	529		
Majority			45.2	n/a
Turnout			48.6	n/a
Conservative win (new boundaries)				
Conservative win (new boundaries)				

== 1964–1978 Bromley council elections ==
External images
- Biggin Hill ward, 1 April 1965
- Northwest
- Northeast
- Southwest
- Southeast

=== 1975 by-election ===
The by-election took place on 2 October 1975, following the aldermanic election of Marjorie McClure.

1975 Biggin Hill by-election
Party	Candidate	Votes	%	±%
Conservative	Michael Hughes	1,307		
Liberal	George Dunk	596		
Labour	Roy Hodsdon	529		
Turnout			35.0	
Conservative hold				

=== 1974 election ===
The election took place on 2 May 1974.

1974 Bromley London Borough Council election: Biggin Hill (2)
Party	Candidate	Votes	%	±%
Conservative	Marjorie McClure	1,509		
Conservative	Derek Saunders	1,505		
Liberal	C. Deans	1,017		
Liberal	H. Heatley	1,000		
Labour	Roy Hodsdon	782		
Labour	D. Hodsdon	757		
Turnout				
Conservative hold				
Conservative hold				

=== 1971 election ===
The election took place on 13 May 1971.

1971 Bromley London Borough Council election: Biggin Hill (2)
Party	Candidate	Votes	%	±%
Conservative	Derek Saunders	1,597		
Conservative	Marjorie McClure	1,594		
Liberal	Philip Golding	1,089		
Liberal	B. Beard	990		
Labour	R. Hodsdon	437		
Labour	Jack Townsend	420		
Turnout			51.4	
Conservative hold				
Conservative hold				

=== 1968 election ===
The election took place on 9 May 1968.

1968 Bromley London Borough Council election: Biggin Hill (2)
Party	Candidate	Votes	%	±%
Conservative	Marjorie McClure	1,614		
Conservative	Derek Saunders	1,586		
Liberal	Philip Golding	886		
Liberal	J. Williams	827		
Labour	Jack Townsend	170		
Labour	C. Squire	144		
Turnout				
Conservative hold				
Conservative hold				

=== 1964 election ===
The election took place on 7 May 1964.

1964 Bromley London Borough Council election: Biggin Hill (2)
Party	Candidate	Votes	%	±%
Conservative	Derek Saunders	964		
Conservative	Marjorie McClure	962		
Liberal	Philip Golding	739		
Liberal	Wilfred Ashworth	659		
Communist	Patrick Sloan	155		
Labour	William Mulligan	137		
Labour	T. Pullen	120		
Turnout		1,936	52.4	
Conservative win (new seat)				
Conservative win (new seat)				
