= Darwin (ward) =

Ward of the London Borough of Bromley

- Electoral ward for the Bromley London Borough Council
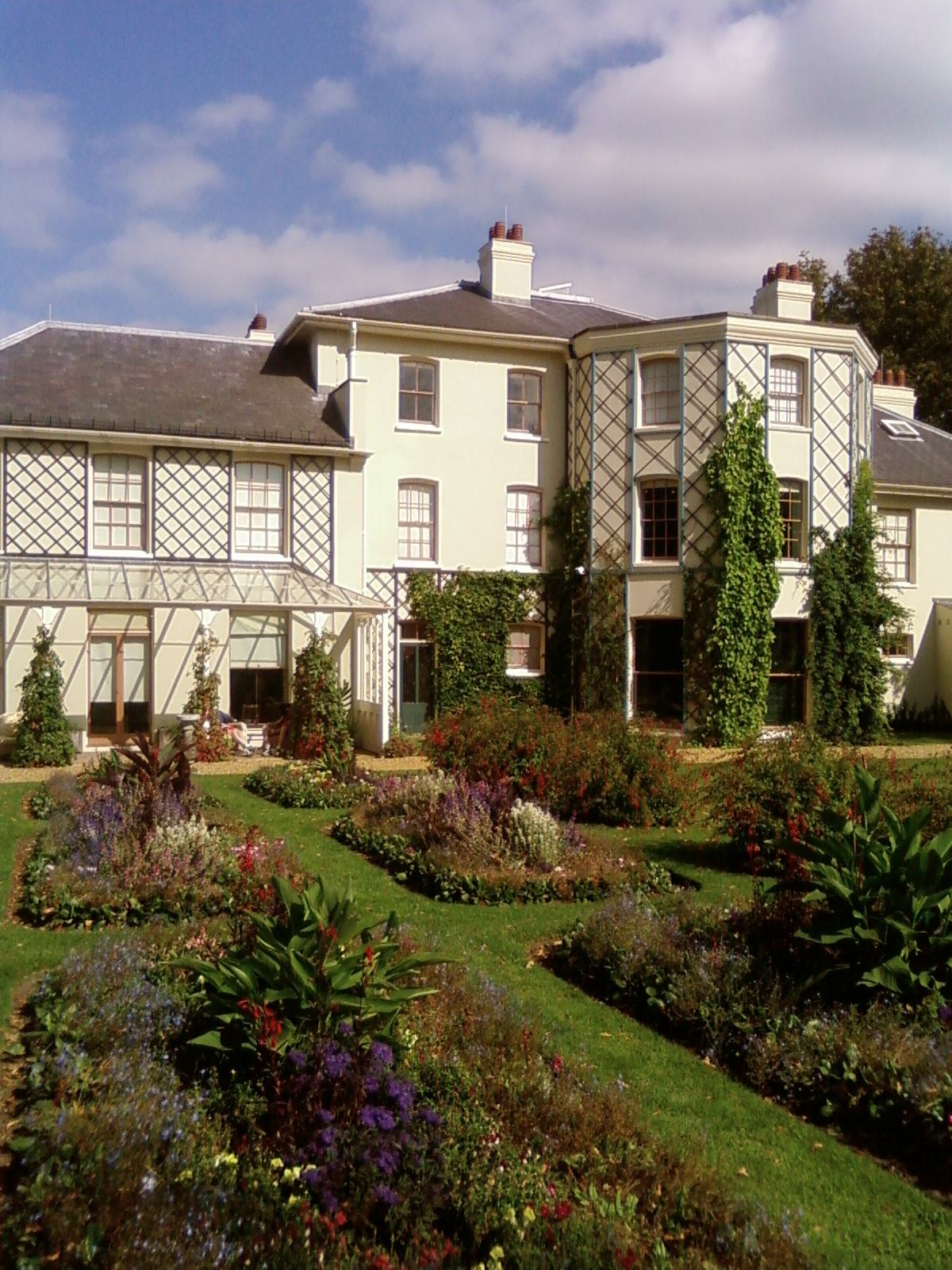
- The ward is named for Charles Darwin who lived at Down House
- Darwin ward boundaries since 2022
- Borough: Bromley
- County: Greater London
- Population: 5,772 (2021) (Note: 2021 Census data reported for 2022 ward boundaries)
- Electorate: 2,469 (1964); 2,891 (1971); 3,350 (1978); 3,252 (1994); 3,790 (2002); 4,241 (2022)
- Area: 25.20 square kilometres (9.73 sq mi) (1968); 30.65 square kilometres (11.83 sq mi) (1990); 29.04 square kilometres (11.21 sq mi) (2002); 32.74 square kilometres (12.64 sq mi) (2022)

Current electoral ward
- Created: 1965
- Number of members: 1
- Councillors: Jonathan Andrews
- ONS code: 00AFGQ (2002–2022)
- GSS code: E05000117 (2002–2022); E05013996 (2022–present)

Darwin is an electoral ward in the London Borough of Bromley. The ward has existed since the creation of the borough on 1 April 1965 and was first used in the 1964 elections. It returns one councillor to Bromley London Borough Council. To date, the ward has only been represented by the Conservative Party. The ward covers the most rural part of the borough consisting a number of hamlets. It is the largest electoral ward in Greater London. As originally created in 1965 it included Downe, Cudham, Luxted, Single Street, Berry's Green, Horns Green and Knockholt. Leaves Green, Pratt's Bottom and South Street have also formed part of the ward at certain times. Since 2022 it has covered an area of 32.74 square kilometres (12.64 sq mi). The ward is named after Charles Darwin who had a home in the village of Downe.

== List of councillors ==
Term	Councillor	Party
1964–1967	Arthur Ferris	Conservative
1967–1971	Christopher Knox-Johnston	Conservative
1971–1975	Richard Knox-Johnston	Conservative
1975–1978	Marion Roe	Conservative
1978–1982	Anthony Komedera	Conservative
1982–2010	Peter Bloomfield	Conservative
2010–2022	Richard Scoates	Conservative
2022–present	Jonathan Andrews	Conservative

== Bromley council elections since 2022 ==
There was a revision of ward boundaries in Bromley in 2022. Pratt's Bottom was added back to the ward and in the north the boundary was moved closer to Farnborough.

=== 2022 election ===
The election took place on 5 May 2022.

2022 Bromley London Borough Council election: Darwin
Party	Candidate	Votes	%	±%
Conservative	Jonathan Andrews	920	56.4	
Independent	Julian Grainger	326	20.0	
Labour	Jeff Slee	162	9.9	
Liberal Democrats	John Loosemore	128	7.9	
Green	Jan Wilson	89	5.5	
Turnout		1,630	36	
Registered electors		4,241		
Conservative win (new boundaries)				

== 2002–2022 Bromley council elections ==
Darwin ward boundaries from 2002 to 2022

There was a revision of ward boundaries in Bromley in 2002. Pratt's Bottom was taken out of the ward and more of South Street was included.

=== 2018 election ===
The election took place on 3 May 2018.

2018 Bromley London Borough Council election: Darwin
Party	Candidate	Votes	%	±%
Conservative	Richard Scoates	1,201	72.8	
Labour	Frank Evans	185	11.2	
Liberal Democrats	Millicent Brooks	133	8.1	
Green	Jan Wilson	130	7.9	
Majority		1,016	61.6	
Turnout		1,649	40.1	
Conservative hold		Swing		

=== 2014 election ===
The election took place on 22 May 2014.

2014 Bromley London Borough Council election: Darwin
Party	Candidate	Votes	%	±%
Conservative	Richard Scoates	987	51.2	
UKIP	Eric Hayward	681	35.3	
Labour	John Evans	105	5.4	
Green	Eileen Galloway	89	4.6	
Liberal Democrats	William Ritchie	45	2.3	
Majority		306	15.9	
Turnout		1,927	38.7	
Conservative hold		Swing		

=== 2010 election ===
The election on 6 May 2010 took place on the same day as the United Kingdom general election.

2010 Bromley London Borough Council election: Darwin
Party	Candidate	Votes	%	±%
Conservative	Richard Scoates	1,362		
Independent	Peter Bloomfield	1,295		
UKIP	Mick Greenhough	299		
Turnout				
Conservative hold		Swing		

=== 2006 election ===
The election took place on 4 May 2006.

2006 Bromley London Borough Council election: Darwin
Party	Candidate	Votes	%	±%
Conservative	Peter Bloomfield	1,327	77.4	
Liberal Democrats	Caroline De Vivo	294	17.1	
Labour	John Lewis	94	5.5	
Turnout			46.7	
Conservative hold		Swing		

=== 2002 election ===
The election took place on 2 May 2002.

2002 Bromley London Borough Council election: Darwin
Party	Candidate	Votes	%	±%
Conservative	Peter Bloomfield	1,313		
Liberal Democrats	Michael Chamarette	245		
Labour	Joyce Galley	47		
Turnout				
Conservative win (new boundaries)				

== 1994–2002 Bromley council elections ==
The boundaries of the ward were subject to minor changes on 1 April 1994.

=== 1998 election ===
The election took place on 7 May 1998.

1998 Bromley London Borough Council election: Darwin
Party	Candidate	Votes	%	±%
Conservative	Peter Bloomfield	1,268		
Labour	John Lewis	210		
Liberal Democrats	Christine Sperling	208		
Majority			62.8	
Turnout			50.2	
Conservative hold		Swing		

=== 1994 election ===
The election took place on 5 May 1994.

1994 Bromley London Borough Council election: Darwin
Party	Candidate	Votes	%	±%
Conservative	Peter Bloomfield	1,191	69.2	
Liberal Democrats	Richard Stillwell	300	17.4	
Labour	Joyce Galley	230	13.4	
Majority			51.8	
Turnout			53.0	
Conservative win (new boundaries)				

== 1978–1994 Bromley council elections ==
Darwin ward boundaries from 1978 to 1994

There was a revision of ward boundaries in Bromley in 1978. The ward gained Leaves Green, Pratt's Bottom and part of South Street.

=== 1990 election ===
The election took place on 3 May 1990.

1990 Bromley London Borough Council election: Darwin
Party	Candidate	Votes	%	±%
Conservative	Peter Bloomfield	1,343	73.1	
Labour	Sylvia Whitlock	273	14.9	
Liberal Democrats	Malcolm Westbrook	220	12.0	
Majority			58.3	
Turnout			54.1	
Conservative hold		Swing		

=== 1986 election ===
The election took place on 8 May 1986.

1986 Bromley London Borough Council election: Darwin
Party	Candidate	Votes	%	±%
Conservative	Peter Bloomfield	1,252	69.7	+2.1
Liberal	Derek Goldsmith	397	22.1	−3.7
Labour	Martin Synan	148	8.2	+1.5
Majority			47.6	+5.8
Turnout			50.3	−6.3
Conservative hold		Swing	+2.95	

=== 1982 election ===
The election took place on 6 May 1982.

1982 Bromley London Borough Council election: Darwin
Party	Candidate	Votes	%	±%
Conservative	Peter Bloomfield	1,316	67.6	−6.3
Liberal	Derek Goldsmith	502	25.8	+10.7
Labour	John Willman	130	6.7	−4.3
Majority			41.8	−17.0
Turnout			56.6	+3.0
Conservative hold		Swing	-8.5	

=== 1978 election ===
The election took place on 4 May 1978.

1978 Bromley London Borough Council election: Darwin
Party	Candidate	Votes	%	±%
Conservative	Anthony Komedera	1,325	73.9	n/a
Liberal	Patrick McNally	270	15.1	n/a
Labour	John Goffee	198	11.0	n/a
Majority			58.8	n/a
Turnout			53.6	n/a
Conservative win (new boundaries)				

== 1969–1978 Bromley council elections ==
The boundaries of the ward were adjusted on 1 April 1969. Knockholt (population 1,257 in 1971) was removed from the ward.

=== 1975 by-election ===
A by-election took place on 2 October 1975.

1975 Darwin by-election
Party	Candidate	Votes	%	±%
Conservative	Marion Roe	828		
Liberal	Derek Goldsmith	551		
Labour	Keith Galley	93		
Turnout			52.0	
Conservative hold		Swing		

=== 1974 election ===
The election took place on 2 May 1974.

1974 Bromley London Borough Council election: Darwin
Party	Candidate	Votes	%	±%
Conservative	Richard Knox-Johnston	989		
Liberal	Derek Goldsmith	589		
Labour	John Goffe	153		
Turnout				
Conservative hold		Swing		

=== 1971 election ===
The election took place on 13 May 1971.

1971 Bromley London Borough Council election: Darwin
Party	Candidate	Votes	%	±%
Conservative	Richard Knox-Johnston	989		
Liberal	R. Townsend	758		
Labour	G. Cox	103		
Turnout				
Conservative win (new boundaries)				

== 1964–1969 Bromley council elections ==
External images
- Darwin ward (north), 1 April 1965
- Darwin ward (south), 1 April 1965

The ward was first used for the 1964 election to Bromley London Borough Council. It included the most rural part of the borough including the villages and hamlets of Downe, Cudham, Luxted, Single Street, Berry's Green, Horns Green and Knockholt.

=== 1968 election ===
The election took place on 9 May 1968.

1968 Bromley London Borough Council election: Darwin
Party	Candidate	Votes	%	±%
Conservative	Christopher Knox-Johnston	1,007		
Liberal	Joyce Carter	622		
Labour	G. Cox	38		
Turnout				
Conservative hold		Swing		

=== 1967 by-election ===
A by-election took place on 11 May 1967.

1967 Darwin by-election
Party	Candidate	Votes	%	±%
Conservative	Christopher Knox-Johnston	809	49.7	
Liberal	Joyce Cater	775	47.6	
Labour	Gustav White	43	2.6	
Turnout				
Conservative hold		Swing		

=== 1964 election ===
The election took place on 7 May 1964.

1964 Bromley London Borough Council election: Darwin
Party	Candidate	Votes	%	±%
Conservative	Arthur Ferris	782		
Liberal	Joseph Bray	673		
Labour	G. Cox	93		
Turnout		1,551	62.8	
Conservative win (new seat)				
