= 1998 Bromley London Borough Council election =

1998 local election in England

- 7 May 1998

All 60 seats up for election to Bromley London Borough Council 31 seats needed for a majority
- Registered: 223,835
- Turnout: 91,383, 40.83% (▼7.28)

| | First party | Second party | Third party |
|---|---|---|---|
| Leader | Michael Tickner | Chris Maines | Sue Polydorou |
| Party | Conservative | Liberal Democrats | Labour |
| Leader since | 1997 | Unknown | Unknown |
| Leader's seat | Kelsey Park | Orpington Central | St Mary Cray |
| Last election | 32 seats, 41.31% | 21 seats, 36.75% | 7 seats, 20.68% |
| Seats won | 28 | 25 | 7 |
| Seat change | ▼4 | ▲4 | Steady |
| Popular vote | 94,562 | 73,660 | 39,185 |
| Percentage | 45.28% | 35.27% | 18.76% |
| Swing | ▲3.97 | ▼1.48 | ▼1.92 |
Council Control before election
Conservative
Council Control after election
No Overall Control

Elections to Bromley Council in England were held on 7 May 1998. The whole council was up for election and the Conservative party lost overall control of the council to no overall control.

Because the council fell into no overall control, for the first time in the London Borough of Bromley history it was taken over by a Liberal Democrat/Labour Coalition. This ended in 2001 when the Conservatives regained the council.

== Background ==
Between the 1994 election and this election there were 2 by-elections to replace Councillors who resigned from their seats, one in Bickley and one in Kelsey Park. Neither of these elections resulted in a seat changing parties with Conservatives retaining both clips.

There were no other defections or vacancies, so just before the election the composition of the council was as follows:

↓
| 7 | 21 | 32 |
| Labour | Lib Dem | Con |

== Election result ==
Turnout across the borough dropped to 40.8%, the lowest in the history of the council.

1998 Bromley London Borough Council elections
| Party | Seats | Gains | Losses | Net gain/loss | Seats % | Votes % | Votes | +/− |
|---|---|---|---|---|---|---|---|---|
| Conservative | 28 | 0 | 4 | ▼4 | 46.67 | 45.28 | 94,562 | ▲3.97 |
| Liberal Democrats | 25 | 5 | 1 | ▲4 | 41.67 | 35.27 | 73,660 | ▼1.48 |
| Labour | 7 | 1 | 1 | Steady | 11.67 | 18.76 | 39,185 | ▼1.92 |
| Green | 0 | 0 | 0 | Steady | 0.00 | 0.55 | 1,161 | ▲0.05 |
| UK Independent | 0 | 0 | 0 | Steady | 0.00 | 0.14 | 285 | New |
| Total | 60 | | | | | | 208,853 | |

Despite the Conservatives increasing their share of the vote at the expense of both Labour and Liberal Democrats, they still lost seats to the Liberal Democrats and with it, control of the council. Labour, despite losing votes and seats found themselves as part of the administration. For the first time, the Liberal Democrats had managed to get the first past the post voting system to work in their favour by winning a higher share of seats than share of vote.

After the election, the composition of the council was as follows:

↓
| 7 | 25 | 28 |
| Labour | Lib Dem | Con |

== Ward results ==
(*) - Indicates an incumbent candidate

(†) - Indicates an incumbent candidate standing in a different ward

=== Anerley ===
Anerley (2)
| Party | Candidate | Votes | % | ±% |
|---|---|---|---|---|
| Liberal Democrats | Christopher Gaster* | 1,362 | 56.29 | ▲0.70 |
| Liberal Democrats | Bill MacCormick* | 1,289 | | |
| Labour | Clinton McCree | 765 | 30.21 | ▼1.96 |
| Labour | Andrew Pharoah | 658 | | |
| Conservative | Adrian Smith | 328 | 13.50 | ▲1.26 |
| Conservative | John De'Giovanni | 308 | | |
| Registered electors | | 7,563 | | ▼564 |
| Turnout | | 2,584 | 34.17 | ▼12.39 |
| Rejected ballots | | 13 | 0.50 | ▲0.32 |
| Liberal Democrats hold | | | | |
| Liberal Democrats hold | | | | |

=== Bickley ===
Bickley (3)
| Party | Candidate | Votes | % | ±% |
|---|---|---|---|---|
| Conservative | Ingrid Buckley* | 2,507 | 59.81 | ▲1.62 |
| Conservative | Sheila Humphreys* | 2,449 | | |
| Conservative | Gordon Jenkins* (Note: Jenkins was elected in a by-election triggered by the resignation of Cllr Dear in 1996) | 2,357 | | |
| Liberal Democrats | David Dear | 1,027 | 24.59 | ▲0.64 |
| Liberal Democrats | Anne Chaplin | 991 | | |
| Liberal Democrats | Susan Taylor | 989 | | |
| Labour | Susan Cox | 690 | 15.60 | ▼2.27 |
| Labour | Arthur Johnson | 638 | | |
| Labour | Alfred Parish | 579 | | |
| Registered electors | | 10,575 | | ▲214 |
| Turnout | | 4,316 | 40.81 | ▼6.36 |
| Rejected ballots | | 16 | 0.37 | ▲0.27 |
| Conservative hold | | | | |
| Conservative hold | | | | |
| Conservative hold | | | | |

=== Biggin Hill ===
Biggin Hill (2)
| Party | Candidate | Votes | % | ±% |
|---|---|---|---|---|
| Liberal Democrats | Geoffrey Gostt* | 1,830 | 51.13 | ▼1.05 |
| Liberal Democrats | Walter Shekyls* | 1,742 | | |
| Conservative | David Haslam | 1,481 | 40.75 | ▲0.95 |
| Conservative | Christopher Wordingham | 1,366 | | |
| Labour | Brendan French | 284 | 8.12 | ▲0.11 |
| Labour | Leonard Hall | 283 | | |
| Registered electors | | 8,570 | | ▲281 |
| Turnout | | 3,691 | 43.07 | ▼6.16 |
| Rejected ballots | | 8 | 0.22 | ▲0.10 |
| Liberal Democrats hold | | | | |
| Liberal Democrats hold | | | | |

=== Bromley Common and Keston ===
Bromley Common and Keston (3)
| Party | Candidate | Votes | % | ±% |
|---|---|---|---|---|
| Liberal Democrats | Paul Booth* | 2,284 | 50.39 | ▼12.50 |
| Liberal Democrats | Alan Carter | 2,030 | | |
| Liberal Democrats | Alexa Michael* | 2,027 | | |
| Conservative | Stephen Carr | 1,670 | 37.33 | ▲11.18 |
| Conservative | Sharon Evans | 1,533 | | |
| Conservative | Toby Sanders | 1,495 | | |
| Labour | Christopher Bartram | 531 | 12.28 | ▲1.32 |
| Labour | Simon Williams | 520 | | |
| Labour | Julia Fogden | 495 | | |
| Registered electors | | 12,156 | | ▲80 |
| Turnout | | 4,469 | 36.76 | ▼12.07 |
| Rejected ballots | | 9 | 0.20 | ▲0.06 |
| Liberal Democrats hold | | | | |
| Liberal Democrats hold | | | | |
| Liberal Democrats hold | | | | |

=== Chelsfield and Goddington ===
Chelsfield and Goddington (3)
| Party | Candidate | Votes | % | ±% |
|---|---|---|---|---|
| Liberal Democrats | Graem Peters* | 2,477 | 49.01 | ▼9.26 |
| Liberal Democrats | Gillian Chamarette* | 2,461 | | |
| Liberal Democrats | Michael Hall* | 2,399 | | |
| Conservative | Adrian Marshall | 2,146 | 41.97 | ▲9.40 |
| Conservative | Andre Madrell | 2,105 | | |
| Conservative | Dean Saint | 2,032 | | |
| Labour | Charles Hailes | 479 | 9.02 | ▼0.14 |
| Labour | Carol Hannay | 456 | | |
| Labour | Peter Tozer | 415 | | |
| Registered electors | | 11,641 | | ▲23 |
| Turnout | | 5,248 | 45.08 | ▼7.55 |
| Rejected ballots | | 16 | 0.30 | ▲0.19 |
| Liberal Democrats hold | | | | |
| Liberal Democrats hold | | | | |
| Liberal Democrats hold | | | | |

=== Chislehurst ===
Chislehurst (3)
| Party | Candidate | Votes | % | ±% |
|---|---|---|---|---|
| Conservative | Joan Bryant* | 2,911 | 61.60 | ▲5.96 |
| Conservative | Kathleen Boughey* | 2,886 | | |
| Conservative | Joan Wykes* | 2,734 | | |
| Labour | Charles Phillips | 988 | 20.10 | ▲0.48 |
| Labour | Andrew Amos | 920 | | |
| Labour | Sharon Wheeler | 876 | | |
| Liberal Democrats | Frances Borrowman | 742 | 14.83 | ▼3.44 |
| Liberal Democrats | Ian Magrath | 665 | | |
| Liberal Democrats | Olwen Wade-Jones | 646 | | |
| Green | John Taylor | 213 | 3.47 | ▼3.00 |
| Green | Glen Shipley-Younan | 107 | | |
| Registered electors | | 12,640 | | ▲56 |
| Turnout | | 4,849 | 38.36 | ▼7.44 |
| Rejected ballots | | 21 | 0.43 | ▲0.15 |
| Conservative hold | | | | |
| Conservative hold | | | | |
| Conservative hold | | | | |

=== Clock House ===
Clock House (2)
| Party | Candidate | Votes | % | ±% |
|---|---|---|---|---|
| Liberal Democrats | David Crowe* | 1,871 | 54.04 | ▲12.84 |
| Liberal Democrats | Martin Lockwood* | 1,802 | | |
| Labour | John Dempster | 836 | 23.66 | ▼7.97 |
| Conservative | David Burch | 777 | 22.30 | ▼4.87 |
| Labour | Richard Hart | 772 | | |
| Conservative | Simon Fawthorp | 739 | | |
| Registered electors | | 8,009 | | ▲71 |
| Turnout | | 3,639 | 45.44 | ▼11.67 |
| Rejected ballots | | 3 | 0.08 | ▼0.14 |
| Liberal Democrats hold | | | | |
| Liberal Democrats hold | | | | |

=== Copers Cope ===
Copers Cope (2)
| Party | Candidate | Votes | % | ±% |
|---|---|---|---|---|
| Conservative | Anthony Wilkinson | 1,351 | 61.55 | ▲6.11 |
| Conservative | Russell Mellor | 1,327 | | |
| Liberal Democrats | George Denyer | 486 | 22.16 | ▼5.27 |
| Liberal Democrats | Patricia Weal | 478 | | |
| Labour | Richard O'Kelly | 361 | 16.29 | ▼0.83 |
| Labour | Simon Dawe | 348 | | |
| Registered electors | | 6,299 | | ▲10 |
| Turnout | | 2,237 | 35.51 | ▼5.74 |
| Rejected ballots | | 8 | 0.36 | ▲0.17 |
| Conservative hold | | | | |
| Conservative hold | | | | |

=== Crofton ===
Crofton (2)
| Party | Candidate | Votes | % | ±% |
|---|---|---|---|---|
| Liberal Democrats | Helen Rabbatts* | 2,007 | 51.14 | ▼5.23 |
| Liberal Democrats | Vivian Ross* | 1,883 | | |
| Conservative | JudithEllis | 1,609 | 41.68 | ▲5.55 |
| Conservative | Richard Rayment | 1,562 | | |
| Labour | Lynn Selwood | 285 | 7.18 | ▼0.32 |
| Labour | Christopher Taylor | 261 | | |
| Registered electors | | 7,959 | | ▼66 |
| Turnout | | 3,968 | 49.86 | ▼8.33 |
| Rejected ballots | | 10 | 0.25 | ▲0.14 |
| Liberal Democrats hold | | | | |
| Liberal Democrats hold | | | | |

=== Darwin ===
Darwin (1)
| Party | Candidate | Votes | % | ±% |
|---|---|---|---|---|
| Conservative | Peter Bloomfield* | 1,268 | 75.21 | ▲6.01 |
| Labour | John Lewis | 210 | 12.45 | ▼0.92 |
| Liberal Democrats | Christine Sperling | 208 | 12.34 | ▼5.09 |
| Registered electors | | 3,367 | | ▲115 |
| Turnout | | 1,690 | 50.19 | ▼2.73 |
| Rejected ballots | | 5 | 0.30 | ▲0.30 |
| Conservative hold | | | | |

=== Eden Park ===
Eden Park (2)
| Party | Candidate | Votes | % | ±% |
|---|---|---|---|---|
| Liberal Democrats | Jane Green | 1,474 | 45.10 | ▲12.30 |
| Liberal Democrats | Anthony Phillips | 1,338 | | |
| Conservative | Albert Miles* | 1,237 | 39.20 | ▼8.49 |
| Conservative | Robert Herd | 1,207 | | |
| Labour | Raymond Taylor | 526 | 15.70 | ▼3.81 |
| Labour | Richard Watts | 453 | | |
| Registered electors | | 7,254 | | ▲104 |
| Turnout | | 3,323 | 45.81 | ▲0.48 |
| Rejected ballots | | 11 | 0.33 | ▲0.14 |
| Liberal Democrats gain from Conservative | | | | |
| Liberal Democrats gain from Conservative | | | | |

=== Farnborough ===
Farnborough (2)
| Party | Candidate | Votes | % | ±% |
|---|---|---|---|---|
| Conservative | Jennifer Hillier* | 1,855 | 62.04 | ▲1.30 |
| Conservative | Eric Goodman* | 1,832 | | |
| Liberal Democrats | Terence Clark | 612 | 19.01 | ▼9.20 |
| Liberal Democrats | Michael Chamarette | 518 | | |
| Labour | Malcolm Barker | 318 | 9.36 | ▼1.69 |
| UK Independent | James Carver | 285 | 9.59 | New |
| Labour | Canh Linh | 238 | | |
| Registered electors | | 7,330 | | ▲166 |
| Turnout | | 3,019 | 41.19 | ▼6.21 |
| Rejected ballots | | 7 | 0.23 | ▲0.14 |
| Conservative hold | | | | |
| Conservative hold | | | | |

=== Hayes ===
Hayes (3)
| Party | Candidate | Votes | % | ±% |
|---|---|---|---|---|
| Conservative | Thelma Manning | 2,831 | 62.62 | ▲5.64 |
| Conservative | Graham Arthur | 2,672 | | |
| Conservative | Neil Reddin | 2,666 | | |
| Labour | Gary Boxall | 882 | 19.29 | ▲0.08 |
| Labour | George Johnstone | 824 | | |
| Liberal Democrats | Bob Skinner | 820 | 18.09 | ▼5.72 |
| Labour | Michael King | 811 | | |
| Liberal Democrats | Mark Gill | 784 | | |
| Liberal Democrats | William Stott | 756 | | |
| Registered electors | | 11,114 | | ▲193 |
| Turnout | | 4,598 | 41.37 | ▼5.92 |
| Rejected ballots | | 19 | 0.41 | ▲0.10 |
| Conservative hold | | | | |
| Conservative hold | | | | |
| Conservative hold | | | | |

=== Kelsey Park ===
Kelsey Park (2)
| Party | Candidate | Votes | % | ±% |
|---|---|---|---|---|
| Conservative | Michael Tickner* | 1,938 | 64.98 | ▲4.82 |
| Conservative | Christopher Elgar^{†} (Note: Elgar was a sitting councillor representing the Copers Cope ward) | 1,909 | | |
| Liberal Democrats | Reginald Adams | 662 | 21.93 | ▼4.14 |
| Liberal Democrats | Edward Whitaker | 636 | | |
| Labour | Catherine Boyle | 400 | 13.09 | ▲0.68 |
| Labour | Stephen Hale | 375 | | |
| Registered electors | | 7,285 | | ▲293 |
| Turnout | | 3,344 | 45.90 | ▼5.34 |
| Rejected ballots | | 21 | 0.63 | ▲0.46 |
| Conservative hold | | | | |
| Conservative hold | | | | |

=== Lawrie Park and Kent House ===
Lawrie Park and Kent House (2)
| Party | Candidate | Votes | % | ±% |
|---|---|---|---|---|
| Conservative | John Lewis* | 1,105 | 36.53 | ▲0.80 |
| Conservative | Philip Jones^{†} (Note: Jones was a sitting councillor representing the Hayes ward) | 1,044 | | |
| Labour | Catherine Newman | 999 | 33.55 | ▲1.50 |
| Labour | Munir Malik | 975 | | |
| Liberal Democrats | Brian Astell | 901 | 29.92 | ▲18.78 |
| Liberal Democrats | Paul Nash | 859 | | |
| Registered electors | | 7,110 | | |
| Turnout | | 3,135 | 44.09 | ▼6.38 |
| Rejected ballots | | 13 | 0.41 | ▲0.19 |
| Conservative hold | | | | |
| Conservative hold | | | | |

=== Martins Hill and Town ===
Martins Hill and Town (2)
| Party | Candidate | Votes | % | ±% |
|---|---|---|---|---|
| Liberal Democrats | Peter Ayres* | 1,274 | 43.65 | ▲2.13 |
| Liberal Democrats | Raymond Warner* | 1,144 | | |
| Conservative | Philip Hollobone | 1,111 | 38.54 | ▲2.52 |
| Conservative | Paul Jemetta^{†} (Note: Jemetta was a sitting councillor representing the Plaistow and Sundridge ward) | 1,024 | | |
| Labour | Iain Ambler | 406 | 13.97 | ▼0.68 |
| Labour | Marcus Oliver | 368 | | |
| Green | John Street | 109 | 3.84 | ▼1.33 |
| Green | Gillian Windall | 104 | | |
| Registered electors | | 7,529 | | ▲113 |
| Turnout | | 2,920 | 38.78 | ▼7.28 |
| Rejected ballots | | 10 | 0.34 | ▲0.25 |
| Liberal Democrats hold | | | | |
| Liberal Democrats hold | | | | |

=== Mottingham ===
Mottingham (2)
| Party | Candidate | Votes | % | ±% |
|---|---|---|---|---|
| Labour | Ernest Dyer* | 954 | 49.20 | ▼3.18 |
| Labour | Robert Yeldham* | 826 | | |
| Conservative | Michael Hennessey | 708 | 38.50 | ▲7.07 |
| Conservative | Dennis Boughey | 685 | | |
| Liberal Democrats | Carmel Butler | 235 | 12.30 | ▼3.89 |
| Liberal Democrats | Brian Taylor | 210 | | |
| Registered electors | | 6,207 | | ▼207 |
| Turnout | | 1,976 | 31.84 | ▼11.92 |
| Rejected ballots | | 14 | 0.71 | ▲0.50 |
| Labour hold | | | | |
| Labour hold | | | | |

=== Orpington Central ===
Orpington Central (2)
| Party | Candidate | Votes | % | ±% |
|---|---|---|---|---|
| Liberal Democrats | Christopher Maines* | 1,613 | 66.12 | ▼1.47 |
| Liberal Democrats | Michael Norris* | 1,475 | | |
| Conservative | Paul Bonter | 579 | 24.15 | ▲6.14 |
| Conservative | Julian Grainger | 549 | | |
| Labour | Keith Galley | 235 | 9.72 | ▼4.68 |
| Labour | Christopher Purnell | 219 | | |
| Registered electors | | 6,741 | | ▼113 |
| Turnout | | 2,498 | 37.06 | ▼12.33 |
| Rejected ballots | | 11 | 0.44 | ▲0.35 |
| Liberal Democrats hold | | | | |
| Liberal Democrats hold | | | | |

=== Penge ===
Penge (2)
| Party | Candidate | Votes | % | ±% |
|---|---|---|---|---|
| Labour | Peter Fookes* | 994 | 45.00 | ▼0.13 |
| Labour | Karen Roberts | 958 | | |
| Liberal Democrats | Daniel Ward | 813 | 36.88 | ▲0.36 |
| Liberal Democrats | Sonia Whitaker | 787 | | |
| Conservative | June Briggs | 413 | 18.12 | ▼0.23 |
| Conservative | Robert Erskine | 373 | | |
| Registered electors | | 6,830 | | ▼93 |
| Turnout | | 2,399 | 35.12 | ▼8.52 |
| Rejected ballots | | 10 | 0.42 | ▲0.16 |
| Labour hold | | | | |
| Labour hold | | | | |

=== Petts Wood and Knoll ===
Petts Wood and Knoll (3)
| Party | Candidate | Votes | % | ±% |
|---|---|---|---|---|
| Conservative | Peter Woods* | 2,975 | 52.60 | ▲0.06 |
| Conservative | Tara Bowman | 2,845 | | |
| Conservative | John Ince | 2,791 | | |
| Liberal Democrats | Eileen Edwards | 1,948 | 33.48 | ▲0.45 |
| Liberal Democrats | Margaret Ayres | 1,827 | | |
| Liberal Democrats | Derek Gambell | 1,706 | | |
| Labour | Joan Headington | 606 | 9.82 | ▼4.61 |
| Labour | Amanda Williams | 508 | | |
| Labour | Peter Lisle | 493 | | |
| Green | Martin Childs | 224 | 4.10 | New |
| Registered electors | | 11,824 | | ▲75 |
| Turnout | | 5,549 | 46.93 | ▼3.30 |
| Rejected ballots | | 18 | 0.32 | ▲0.22 |
| Conservative hold | | | | |
| Conservative hold | | | | |
| Conservative hold | | | | |

=== Plaistow and Sundridge ===
Plaistow and Sundridge (3)
| Party | Candidate | Votes | % | ±% |
|---|---|---|---|---|
| Liberal Democrats | James Gillespie | 1,865 | 42.50 | ▲18.30 |
| Conservative | Catherine Bustard | 1,824 | 42.31 | ▼1.60 |
| Liberal Democrats | Stephen Gosling | 1,818 | | |
| Conservative | Michael Turner | 1,812 | | |
| Conservative | Dorothy Laird* | 1,791 | | |
| Liberal Democrats | Lennard Woods | 1,768 | | |
| Labour | Robert Armstrong | 580 | 12.04 | ▼10.05 |
| Labour | Nicholas Wright | 501 | | |
| Labour | Gordon Yates^{†} (Note: Yates was a sitting councillor representing the St Mary Cray ward) | 464 | | |
| Green | Joyce Brown | 147 | 3.15 | ▼6.65 |
| Green | Ann Garrett | 133 | | |
| Green | Frances Speed | 124 | | |
| Registered electors | | 11,386 | | ▲113 |
| Turnout | | 4,543 | 39.90 | ▼4.35 |
| Rejected ballots | | 19 | 0.42 | ▲0.38 |
| Liberal Democrats gain from Conservative | | | | |
| Conservative hold | | | | |
| Liberal Democrats gain from Conservative | | | | |

=== St Mary Cray ===
St Mary Cray (3)
| Party | Candidate | Votes | % | ±% |
|---|---|---|---|---|
| Labour | Susan Polydorou* | 1,381 | 38.27 | ▼8.75 |
| Liberal Democrats | David McBride | 1,332 | 37.44 | ▼11.65 |
| Labour | John Holbrook* | 1,312 | | |
| Liberal Democrats | Michael Oldman | 1,255 | | |
| Liberal Democrats | Brenda Thompson | 1,246 | | |
| Labour | Christopher Price | 1,225 | | |
| Conservative | Carole Bowman | 885 | 24.29 | ▼2.90 |
| Conservative | Valerie Huntingdon-Thresher | 802 | | |
| Conservative | Anne Barrow | 800 | | |
| Registered electors | | 10,409 | | ▼203 |
| Turnout | | 3,682 | 35.37 | ▼6.14 |
| Rejected ballots | | 14 | 0.38 | ▲0.22 |
| Labour hold | | | | |
| Liberal Democrats gain from Labour | | | | |
| Labour hold | | | | |

=== St Paul's Cray ===
St Paul's Cray (3)
| Party | Candidate | Votes | % | ±% |
|---|---|---|---|---|
| Labour | Colin Willetts | 1,662 | 41.67 | ▲7.54 |
| Liberal Democrats | Thomas Hawthorne* | 1,597 | 41.65 | ▼10.71 |
| Liberal Democrats | Martin Curry* | 1,471 | | |
| Liberal Democrats | Duncan Borrowman* | 1,443 | | |
| Labour | Kelly Galvin | 1,440 | | |
| Labour | Elizabeth Johnstone | 1,411 | | |
| Conservative | Mary Macpherson | 612 | 16.68 | ▲3.17 |
| Conservative | Richard Wells | 601 | | |
| Conservative | Christopher Hillier | 593 | | |
| Registered electors | | 11,324 | | ▼136 |
| Turnout | | 3,963 | 35.00 | ▼12.52 |
| Rejected ballots | | 9 | 0.23 | ▲0.06 |
| Labour gain from Liberal Democrats | | | | |
| Liberal Democrats hold | | | | |
| Liberal Democrats hold | | | | |

=== Shortlands ===
Shortlands (2)
| Party | Candidate | Votes | % | ±% |
|---|---|---|---|---|
| Conservative | Malcolm Hyland* | 1,979 | 63.55 | ▲5.72 |
| Conservative | George Taylor | 1,960 | | |
| Liberal Democrats | Heather Donovan | 690 | 22.01 | ▼3.01 |
| Liberal Democrats | Hilary Gaster | 674 | | |
| Labour | Laurence Pocock | 466 | 14.44 | ▲2.78 |
| Labour | Nicholas Reed | 429 | | |
| Registered electors | | 7,714 | | ▲49 |
| Turnout | | 3,266 | 42.34 | ▼4.86 |
| Rejected ballots | | 15 | 0.46 | ▲0.40 |
| Conservative hold | | | | |
| Conservative hold | | | | |

=== West Wickham North ===
West Wickham North (2)
| Party | Candidate | Votes | % | ±% |
|---|---|---|---|---|
| Conservative | Carole Hubbard* | 1,756 | 59.99 | ▲6.65 |
| Conservative | Bryan Humphrys* | 1,689 | | |
| Liberal Democrats | Jennifer Fitch | 673 | 22.11 | ▼14.43 |
| Liberal Democrats | Simon Wales | 597 | | |
| Labour | Graham Blackwood | 531 | 17.90 | ▲7.78 |
| Labour | Rebecca Pearson-Close | 497 | | |
| Registered electors | | 7,035 | | ▲30 |
| Turnout | | 3,012 | 42.81 | ▼7.21 |
| Rejected ballots | | 11 | 0.37 | ▲0.11 |
| Conservative hold | | | | |
| Conservative hold | | | | |

=== West Wickham South ===
West Wickham South (2)
| Party | Candidate | Votes | % | ±% |
|---|---|---|---|---|
| Conservative | John Gray* | 2,146 | 63.35 | ▲10.04 |
| Conservative | Leonard Tutt* | 2,022 | | |
| Labour | Richard Redden | 646 | 19.27 | ▲6.40 |
| Labour | Janet Ambrose | 622 | | |
| Liberal Democrats | Graham Radford | 593 | 17.38 | ▼8.49 |
| Liberal Democrats | John Maydwell | 550 | | |
| Registered electors | | 7,964 | | ▲107 |
| Turnout | | 3,465 | 43.51 | ▼5.12 |
| Rejected ballots | | 15 | 0.43 | ▲0.27 |
| Conservative hold | | | | |
| Conservative hold | | | | |
