= Horns Green =

Coordinates: 51.307204°N 0.081790°E

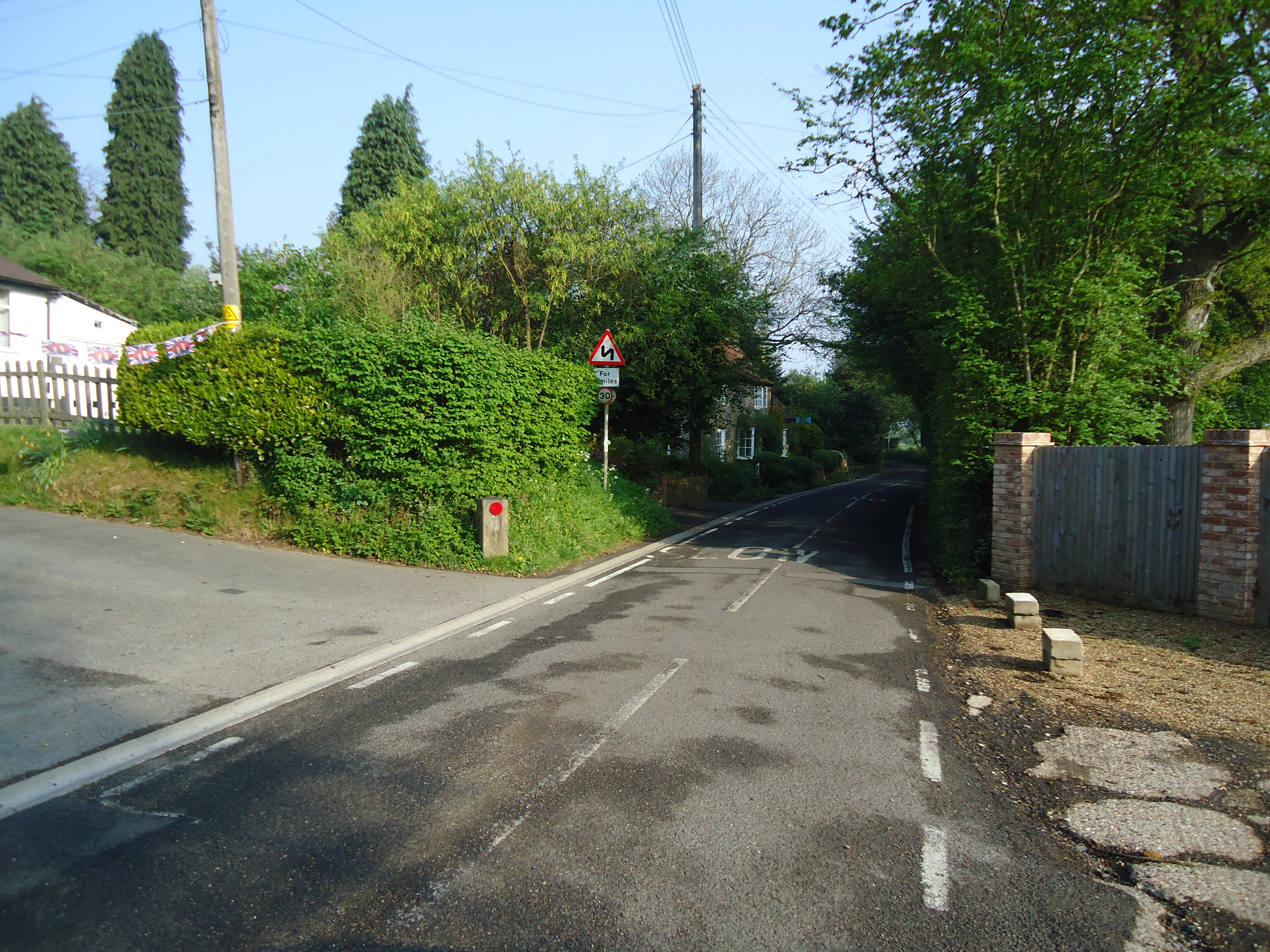
- Cudham Lane South, Horns Green

- Location within Greater London
- London borough: Bromley
- Ceremonial county: Greater London
- Region: London
- Country: England
- Sovereign state: United Kingdom
- Post town: SEVENOAKS
- Postcode district: TN14
- Dialling code: 01959
- Police: Metropolitan
- Fire: London
- Ambulance: London
- London Assembly: Bexley and Bromley

Horns Green is an area in the London Borough of Bromley located to the south of Cudham near the boundary with Kent. It is located in the Darwin (ward), London's largest electoral borough.
