= 1994 Bromley London Borough Council election =

1994 local election in England

- 5 May 1994

All 60 seats to Bromley London Borough Council 31 seats needed for a majority
- Registered: 223,365
- Turnout: 107,452, 48.11% (▼1.69)

| | First party | Second party | Third party |
|---|---|---|---|
| Party | Conservative | Liberal Democrats | Labour |
| Last election | 43 seats, 50.13% | 6 seats, 24.22% | 11 seats, 23.80% |
| Seats before | 42 | 7 | 11 |
| Seats won | 32 | 21 | 7 (Note: Results include those from candidates listed under Labour Co-op) |
| Seat change | ▼10 | ▲15 | ▼4 |
| Popular vote | 102,483 | 91,167 | 51,306 |
| Percentage | 41.31% | 36.75% | 20.68% |
| Swing | ▼8.82 | ▲12.53 | ▼3.12 |
Council control before election
Conservative
Council control after election
Conservative

The 1994 Bromley Council election took place on 5 May 1994 to elect members of Bromley London Borough Council in London, England. The whole council was up for election and the Conservative party stayed in overall control of the council.

== Background ==
The Conservatives went into the election defending a large majority won in 1990. However, that majority had been reduced by two when the Liberal Democrats gained Chelsfield & Goddington in the 1993 by-election.

== Election result ==
The turnout across the borough was 48.1%, the second highest turn out in the council's history.

1994 Bromley London Borough Council local election results
| Party | Seats | Gains | Losses | Net gain/loss | Seats % | Votes % | Votes | +/− |
|---|---|---|---|---|---|---|---|---|
| Conservative | 32 | 0 | 10 | ▼10 | 53.33 | 41.31 | 102,483 | ▼8.82 |
| Liberal Democrats | 21 | 14 | 0 | ▲14 | 35.00 | 36.75 | 91,167 | ▲12.53 |
| Labour | 7 | 0 | 4 | ▼4 | 11.67 | 20.68 | 51,306 | ▼3.12 |
| Liberal FT | 0 | 0 | 0 | Steady | 0.00 | 0.60 | 1,497 | New |
| Green | 0 | 0 | 0 | Steady | 0.00 | 0.50 | 1,254 | ▼0.42 |
| SDP | 0 | 0 | 0 | Steady | 0.00 | 0.16 | 390 | ▼0.49 |
| Total | 60 | | | | | | 248,097 | |

For the Conservatives, 40.9% was their lowest share of the vote of all the nine sets of elections to date and 32 was also their lowest number of seats won. Their overall majority of 4 seats was their lowest in the council's history. For the Liberal Democrats their 36.6% was their highest share of the vote and 21 the most number of seats won. The first past the post voting system was shown to have benefitted the Conservatives and worked against the Labour Party while the Liberal Democrats achieved a fair representation.

== Ward results ==
=== Anerley ===
Anerley (2)
| Party | Candidate | Votes | % | ±% |
|---|---|---|---|---|
| Liberal Democrats | Christopher Gaster* | 2,026 | 55.59 | ▲11.95 |
| Liberal Democrats | Bill MacCormick* | 1,971 | | |
| Labour | Clinton McCree | 1,172 | 32.17 | ▼3.46 |
| Labour | Corinna Smart | 1,142 | | |
| Conservative | David Burch | 447 | 12.24 | ▼0.68 |
| Conservative | Adrian Smith | 432 | | |
| Registered electors | | 8,127 | | ▼447 |
| Turnout | | 3,784 | 46.56 | ▼1.62 |
| Rejected ballots | | 7 | 0.18 | ▲0.06 |
| Liberal Democrats hold | | | | |
| Liberal Democrats hold | | | | |

=== Bickley ===
Bickley (3)
| Party | Candidate | Votes | % | ±% |
|---|---|---|---|---|
| Conservative | David Dear* | 2,748 | 58.19 | ▼4.04 |
| Conservative | Sheila Humphreys | 2,723 | | |
| Conservative | Ingrid Buckley | 2,687 | | |
| Liberal Democrats | Michael Chuter | 1,163 | 23.95 | ▲1.85 |
| Liberal Democrats | Keith Room | 1,110 | | |
| Liberal Democrats | Robert Woollett | 1,083 | | |
| Labour | Alan Bartlett | 878 | 17.87 | ▲2.20 |
| Labour | Elsie Herne | 823 | | |
| Labour | Kenneth Herring | 805 | | |
| Registered electors | | 10,361 | | ▼121 |
| Turnout | | 4,887 | 47.17 | ▼3.36 |
| Rejected ballots | | 5 | 0.10 | ▼0.01 |
| Conservative hold | | | | |
| Conservative hold | | | | |
| Conservative hold | | | | |

=== Biggin Hill ===
Biggin Hill (2)
| Party | Candidate | Votes | % | ±% |
|---|---|---|---|---|
| Liberal Democrats | Geoffrey Gostt | 2,085 | 52.18 | ▲29.82 |
| Liberal Democrats | Walter Shekyls | 1,978 | | |
| Conservative | David Haslam* | 1,580 | 39.80 | ▼16.60 |
| Conservative | John Cokayne | 1,520 | | |
| Labour | Leonard Hall | 327 | 8.01 | ▼8.81 |
| Labour | Keith Galley | 297 | | |
| Registered electors | | 8,289 | | ▲106 |
| Turnout | | 4,081 | 49.23 | ▲2.74 |
| Rejected ballots | | 5 | 0.12 | ▼0.01 |
| Liberal Democrats gain from Conservative | | | | |
| Liberal Democrats gain from Conservative | | | | |

=== Bromley Common and Keston ===
Bromley Common and Keston (3)
| Party | Candidate | Votes | % | ±% |
|---|---|---|---|---|
| Liberal Democrats | Paul Booth* | 3,791 | 62.89 | ▲19.48 |
| Liberal Democrats | Elsie Phythian | 3,410 | | |
| Liberal Democrats | Alexa Michael | 3,336 | | |
| Conservative | Catherine Bustard* | 1,600 | 26.15 | ▼15.11 |
| Conservative | Rose Covell | 1,479 | | |
| Conservative | Neil Reddin | 1,300 | | |
| Labour | Christopher Martin | 627 | 10.96 | ▼4.37 |
| Labour | Robert Forman | 612 | | |
| Labour | Pamela Remon | 597 | | |
| Registered electors | | 12,076 | | ▼536 |
| Turnout | | 5,897 | 48.83 | ▼1.82 |
| Rejected ballots | | 8 | 0.14 | ▼0.03 |
| Liberal Democrats hold | | | | |
| Liberal Democrats gain from Conservative | | | | |
| Liberal Democrats hold | | | | |

=== Chelsfield and Goddington ===
Chelsfield and Goddington (3)
| Party | Candidate | Votes | % | ±% |
|---|---|---|---|---|
| Liberal Democrats | Graem Peters* (Note: Peters replaced Cllr Adams after his resignation in 1993) | 3,491 | 58.27 | ▲18.99 |
| Liberal Democrats | Gillian Chamarette | 3,420 | | |
| Liberal Democrats | Michael Hall | 3,297 | | |
| Conservative | Judith Ellis* | 1,949 | 32.57 | ▼17.03 |
| Conservative | Julian Grainger* | 1,925 | | |
| Conservative | Anthony Youd | 1,831 | | |
| Labour | Charles Hailes | 548 | 9.16 | ▼1.96 |
| Labour | Odette Coram | 530 | | |
| Labour | Carol Hannay | 528 | | |
| Registered electors | | 11,618 | | ▼286 |
| Turnout | | 6,114 | 52.63 | ▼2.04 |
| Rejected ballots | | 7 | 0.11 | ▼0.01 |
| Liberal Democrats hold | | | | |
| Liberal Democrats gain from Conservative | | | | |
| Liberal Democrats gain from Conservative | | | | |

=== Chislehurst ===
Chislehurst (3)
| Party | Candidate | Votes | % | ±% |
|---|---|---|---|---|
| Conservative | Joan Bryant* | 3,236 | 55.64 | ▼9.50 |
| Conservative | Kathleen Boughey* | 3,205 | | |
| Conservative | Joan Wykes* | 3,050 | | |
| Labour | Charles Phillips | 1,174 | 19.62 | ▼1.17 |
| Liberal Democrats | Ian Magrath | 1,117 | 18.27 | ▲4.20 |
| Labour | Andrew Amos | 1,102 | | |
| Labour | Paul Dyett | 1,071 | | |
| Liberal Democrats | Robert Webster | 1,060 | | |
| Liberal Democrats | George Watson | 940 | | |
| Green | Paul Ryder | 368 | 6.47 | New |
| Registered electors | | 12,584 | | ▼182 |
| Turnout | | 5,764 | 45.80 | ▼2.23 |
| Rejected ballots | | 16 | 0.28 | ▲0.12 |
| Conservative hold | | | | |
| Conservative hold | | | | |
| Conservative hold | | | | |

=== Clock House ===
Clock House (2)
| Party | Candidate | Votes | % | ±% |
|---|---|---|---|---|
| Liberal Democrats | David Crowe | 1,820 | 41.20 | ▲15.05 |
| Liberal Democrats | Martin Lockwood | 1,749 | | |
| Labour | Deborah Russell | 1,388 | 31.63 | ▼3.59 |
| Labour | Richard Watts | 1,351 | | |
| Conservative | Alan Howarth | 1,223 | 27.17 | ▼11.46 |
| Conservative | Roderick Reed | 1,131 | | |
| Registered electors | | 7,938 | | ▼177 |
| Turnout | | 4,533 | 57.11 | ▲4.38 |
| Rejected ballots | | 10 | 0.22 | ▼0.04 |
| Liberal Democrats gain from Conservative | | | | |
| Liberal Democrats gain from Labour | | | | |

=== Copers Cope ===
Copers Cope (2)
| Party | Candidate | Votes | % | ±% |
|---|---|---|---|---|
| Conservative | Christopher Elgar* | 1,438 | 55.44 | ▼9.46 |
| Conservative | Charles Priest* | 1,294 | | |
| Liberal Democrats | Mavis Dowling | 724 | 27.43 | ▲8.33 |
| Liberal Democrats | David Evans | 627 | | |
| Labour | Janice Cooke | 458 | 17.13 | ▲1.13 |
| Labour | Bryan Freake | 385 | | |
| Registered electors | | 6,289 | | ▲16 |
| Turnout | | 2,594 | 41.25 | ▼3.35 |
| Rejected ballots | | 5 | 0.19 | ▼0.02 |
| Conservative hold | | | | |
| Conservative hold | | | | |

=== Crofton ===
Crofton (2)
| Party | Candidate | Votes | % | ±% |
|---|---|---|---|---|
| Liberal Democrats | Helen Rabbatts | 2,598 | 56.37 | ▲23.94 |
| Liberal Democrats | Vivian Ross | 2,513 | | |
| Conservative | Paul Bonter* | 1,666 | 36.13 | ▼16.83 |
| Conservative | Peter Sturdy* | 1,609 | | |
| Labour | Malcolm Barker | 353 | 7.50 | ▼4.28 |
| Labour | Timothy Camm | 326 | | |
| Registered electors | | 8,025 | | ▼225 |
| Turnout | | 4,670 | 58.19 | ▲2.47 |
| Rejected ballots | | 5 | 0.11 | ▼0.04 |
| Liberal Democrats gain from Conservative | | | | |
| Liberal Democrats gain from Conservative | | | | |

=== Darwin ===
Darwin (1)
| Party | Candidate | Votes | % | ±% |
|---|---|---|---|---|
| Conservative | Peter Bloomfield* | 1,191 | 69.20 | ▼3.95 |
| Liberal Democrats | Richard Stillwell | 300 | 17.43 | ▲2.56 |
| Labour | Joyce Galley | 230 | 13.37 | ▲1.39 |
| Registered electors | | 3,252 | | ▼149 |
| Turnout | | 1,721 | 52.92 | ▼1.15 |
| Rejected ballots | | 0 | 0.00 | ▼0.16 |
| Conservative hold | | | | |

=== Eden Park ===
Eden Park (2)
| Party | Candidate | Votes | % | ±% |
|---|---|---|---|---|
| Conservative | Francis Cooke* | 1,496 | 47.69 | ▼10.00 |
| Conservative | Albert Miles* | 1,431 | | |
| Liberal Democrats | Elizabeth Gee | 1,052 | 32.80 | ▲15.82 |
| Liberal Democrats | Kathleen Milward | 962 | | |
| Labour | Gwendoline Edwards | 662 | 19.51 | ▼5.82 |
| Labour | Andrew Price | 535 | | |
| Registered electors | | 7,150 | | ▼226 |
| Turnout | | 3,241 | 45.33 | ▼1.42 |
| Rejected ballots | | 6 | 0.19 | ▲0.02 |
| Conservative hold | | | | |
| Conservative hold | | | | |

=== Farnborough ===
Farnborough (2)
| Party | Candidate | Votes | % | ±% |
|---|---|---|---|---|
| Conservative | Jennifer Hillier* | 1,998 | 60.74 | ▼7.71 |
| Conservative | Eric Goodman* | 1,950 | | |
| Liberal Democrats | Terence Clark | 955 | 28.21 | ▲9.71 |
| Liberal Democrats | Sylvia Norris | 878 | | |
| Labour | Peter Davenport | 373 | 11.05 | ▼2.00 |
| Labour | Lynn Sellwood | 344 | | |
| Registered electors | | 7,164 | | ▼142 |
| Turnout | | 3,396 | 47.40 | ▼2.02 |
| Rejected ballots | | 3 | 0.09 | ▲0.01 |
| Conservative hold | | | | |
| Conservative hold | | | | |

=== Hayes ===
Hayes (3)
| Party | Candidate | Votes | % | ±% |
|---|---|---|---|---|
| Conservative | Ernest Barkway* | 2,859 | 56.98 | ▲0.97 |
| Conservative | Philip Jones* | 2,780 | | |
| Conservative | Nigel Kelsh* | 2,733 | | |
| Liberal Democrats | Mark Gill | 1,196 | 23.81 | ▲11.37 |
| Liberal Democrats | Robert Manser | 1,166 | | |
| Liberal Democrats | William Stott | 1,137 | | |
| Labour | Elizabeth Johnstone | 985 | 19.21 | ▲1.75 |
| Labour | Peter Rance | 934 | | |
| Labour | Roy Shufflebotham | 903 | | |
| Registered electors | | 10,921 | | ▼258 |
| Turnout | | 5,164 | 47.29 | ▼2.54 |
| Rejected ballots | | 15 | 0.31 | ▲0.27 |
| Conservative hold | | | | |
| Conservative hold | | | | |
| Conservative hold | | | | |

=== Kelsey Park ===
Kelsey Park (2)
| Party | Candidate | Votes | % | ±% |
|---|---|---|---|---|
| Conservative | Michael Tickner* | 2,091 | 60.16 | ▼10.40 |
| Conservative | Stephen Oxenbridge | 2,066 | | |
| Liberal Democrats | Russell Egan-Wyer | 921 | 26.07 | ▲10.31 |
| Liberal Democrats | Edward Whitaker | 880 | | |
| Labour | Neil Entwhistle | 489 | 13.77 | ▲0.08 |
| Labour | Geraldine Scanlan | 462 | | |
| Registered electors | | 6,992 | | ▲142 |
| Turnout | | 3,583 | 51.24 | ▲0.47 |
| Rejected ballots | | 6 | 0.17 | ▼0.32 |
| Conservative hold | | | | |
| Conservative hold | | | | |

=== Lawrie Park and Kent House ===
Lawrie Park and Kent House (2)
| Party | Candidate | Votes | % | ±% |
|---|---|---|---|---|
| Conservative | Richard Foister* | 1,277 | 35.73 | ▼3.36 |
| Conservative | John Lewis* | 1,263 | | |
| Labour | Catherine Boyle | 1,153 | 32.05 | ▲1.74 |
| Labour | Andrew Barber | 1,124 | | |
| Liberal FT | Peter White | 785 | 21.07 | New |
| Liberal FT | Gerald Williams | 712 | | |
| Liberal Democrats | Reginald Adams | 435 | 11.14 | ▼12.71 |
| Liberal Democrats | Geoffrey Roberts | 357 | | |
| Registered electors | | 7,351 | | ▼29 |
| Turnout | | 3,710 | 50.47 | ▼1.45 |
| Rejected ballots | | 8 | 0.22 | ▲0.19 |
| Conservative hold | | | | |
| Conservative hold | | | | |

=== Martins Hill and Town ===
Martins Hill and Town (2)
| Party | Candidate | Votes | % | ±% |
|---|---|---|---|---|
| Liberal Democrats | Peter Ayres | 1,442 | 41.52 | ▲32.80 |
| Liberal Democrats | Raymond Warner | 1,335 | | |
| Conservative | Michael Turner | 1,249 | 36.02 | ▼9.19 |
| Conservative | Anthony Wilkinson* | 1,161 | | |
| Labour | Cecil Dean | 574 | 14.65 | ▼11.80 |
| Labour Co-op | Susan Yates | 405 | | |
| Green | Frances Speed | 173 | 5.17 | ▼8.10 |
| SDP | Martin McCabe | 88 | 2.63 | ▼3.72 |
| Registered electors | | 7,416 | | ▲41 |
| Turnout | | 3,416 | 46.06 | ▲2.62 |
| Rejected ballots | | 3 | 0.09 | Steady |
| Liberal Democrats gain from Conservative | | | | |
| Liberal Democrats gain from Conservative | | | | |

=== Mottingham ===
Mottingham (2)
| Party | Candidate | Votes | % | ±% |
|---|---|---|---|---|
| Labour | Ernest Dyer* | 1,475 | 52.38 | ▼0.47 |
| Labour | Robert Yeldham | 1,280 | | |
| Conservative | Dennis Boughey | 827 | 31.43 | ▼1.79 |
| Conservative | Michael Hennessey | 826 | | |
| Liberal Democrats | Ann Ford | 462 | 16.19 | ▲2.27 |
| Liberal Democrats | Brian Taylor | 389 | | |
| Registered electors | | 6,414 | | ▼1,019 |
| Turnout | | 2,807 | 43.76 | ▼8.63 |
| Rejected ballots | | 6 | 0.21 | Steady |
| Labour hold | | | | |
| Labour hold | | | | |

=== Orpington Central ===
Orpington Central (2)
| Party | Candidate | Votes | % | ±% |
|---|---|---|---|---|
| Liberal Democrats | Christopher Maines* | 2,264 | 67.59 | ▲16.25 |
| Liberal Democrats | Michael Norris* | 2,194 | | |
| Conservative | William Huntingdon-Thresher | 599 | 18.01 | ▼10.04 |
| Conservative | Harry Stranger | 589 | | |
| Labour | Harold Barker | 485 | 14.40 | ▼6.21 |
| Labour | Steven Collinson | 465 | | |
| Registered electors | | 6,854 | | ▼479 |
| Turnout | | 3,385 | 49.39 | ▼5.85 |
| Rejected ballots | | 3 | 0.09 | ▼0.08 |
| Liberal Democrats hold | | | | |
| Liberal Democrats hold | | | | |

=== Penge ===
Penge (2)
| Party | Candidate | Votes | % | ±% |
|---|---|---|---|---|
| Labour | Patricia Mansfield* | 1,326 | 45.13 | ▼4.94 |
| Labour | Peter Fookes* | 1,241 | | |
| Liberal Democrats | Daniel Ward | 1,063 | 36.52 | ▲26.49 |
| Liberal Democrats | Sonia Whitaker | 1,015 | | |
| Conservative | John De'Giovanni | 529 | 18.35 | ▼9.30 |
| Conservative | Anthony Mills | 515 | | |
| Registered electors | | 6,923 | | ▼485 |
| Turnout | | 3,021 | 43.64 | ▲1.12 |
| Rejected ballots | | 8 | 0.26 | ▲0.04 |
| Labour hold | | | | |
| Labour hold | | | | |

=== Petts Wood and Knoll ===
Petts Wood and Knoll (3)
| Party | Candidate | Votes | % | ±% |
|---|---|---|---|---|
| Conservative | Peter Woods* | 2,983 | 52.54 | ▼0.32 |
| Conservative | Joan Hatcher | 2,963 | | |
| Conservative | Anthony Owen | 2,932 | | |
| Liberal Democrats | Julia Bye | 1,903 | 33.03 | ▲16.32 |
| Liberal Democrats | Eileen Edwards | 1,877 | | |
| Liberal Democrats | Justin Cockett | 1,801 | | |
| Labour | Christopher Price | 855 | 14.43 | ▲1.56 |
| Labour Co-op | Rosalie Huzzard | 794 | | |
| Labour Co-op | Graeme Burton | 790 | | |
| Registered electors | | 11,749 | | ▼161 |
| Turnout | | 5,902 | 50.23 | ▼4.07 |
| Rejected ballots | | 6 | 0.10 | ▲0.04 |
| Conservative hold | | | | |
| Conservative hold | | | | |
| Conservative hold | | | | |

=== Plaistow and Sundridge ===
Plaistow and Sundridge (3)
| Party | Candidate | Votes | % | ±% |
|---|---|---|---|---|
| Conservative | Jill Andrew* | 2,392 | 43.91 | ▼12.12 |
| Conservative | Paul Jemetta* | 2,291 | | |
| Conservative | Dorothy Laird* | 2,269 | | |
| Liberal Democrats | Lennard Woods | 1,281 | 24.20 | ▲5.59 |
| Liberal Democrats | Michael Deves | 1,272 | | |
| Labour | Robert Armstrong | 1,252 | 22.09 | ▼3.27 |
| Labour | Michael King | 1,144 | | |
| Labour | Nicholas Wright | 1,102 | | |
| Green | Joyce Brown | 517 | 9.80 | New |
| Registered electors | | 11,273 | | ▼277 |
| Turnout | | 4,988 | 44.25 | ▼2.72 |
| Rejected ballots | | 2 | 0.04 | ▼0.24 |
| Conservative hold | | | | |
| Conservative hold | | | | |
| Conservative hold | | | | |

=== St Mary Cray ===
St Mary Cray (3)
| Party | Candidate | Votes | % | ±% |
|---|---|---|---|---|
| Labour | John Holbrook* | 2,087 | 47.02 | ▼2.60 |
| Labour Co-op | Susan Polydrou* | 1,888 | | |
| Labour Co-op | Gordon Yates^{†} (Note: Yates was a sitting councillor representing the Mottingham ward) | 1,780 | | |
| Conservative | Pamela Brockhurst | 1,162 | 27.19 | ▼8.05 |
| Conservative | Leonard Cruse | 1,103 | | |
| Liberal Democrats | Ian Bailey | 1,072 | 25.79 | ▲10.65 |
| Conservative | Anne Barrow | 1,061 | | |
| Liberal Democrats | Ernest Lovell | 1,057 | | |
| Liberal Democrats | Ann Hawthorne | 1,027 | | |
| Registered electors | | 10,612 | | ▼770 |
| Turnout | | 4,405 | 41.51 | ▼4.29 |
| Rejected ballots | | 7 | 0.16 | ▼0.01 |
| Labour hold | | | | |
| Labour Co-op hold | | | | |
| Labour Co-op hold | | | | |

=== St Paul's Cray ===
St Paul's Cray (3)
| Party | Candidate | Votes | % | ±% |
|---|---|---|---|---|
| Liberal Democrats | Thomas Hawthorne | 2,892 | 52.36 | ▲16.05 |
| Liberal Democrats | Martin Curry | 2,536 | | |
| Liberal Democrats | Duncan Borrowman | 2,526 | | |
| Labour | Colin Willetts* | 1,866 | 34.13 | ▼6.94 |
| Labour | Christopher Purnell* | 1,699 | | |
| Labour | Richard Hart | 1,620 | | |
| Conservative | Bernard Cobley | 729 | 13.51 | ▼9.11 |
| Conservative | Edna Bensaid | 685 | | |
| Conservative | Jason Hadden | 637 | | |
| Registered electors | | 11,460 | | ▼810 |
| Turnout | | 5,446 | 47.52 | ▼1.60 |
| Rejected ballots | | 9 | 0.17 | Steady |
| Liberal Democrats gain from Labour | | | | |
| Liberal Democrats gain from Labour | | | | |
| Liberal Democrats gain from Labour | | | | |

=== Shortlands ===
Shortlands (2)
| Party | Candidate | Votes | % | ±% |
|---|---|---|---|---|
| Conservative | Philip Haslop | 2,143 | 57.83 | ▼10.78 |
| Conservative | Malcolm Hyland | 1,985 | | |
| Liberal Democrats | Hilary Gaster | 901 | 25.02 | ▲6.39 |
| Liberal Democrats | Sheila Machray | 884 | | |
| Labour | Simon Dawe | 441 | 11.66 | ▼1.10 |
| Labour | Robert Hughes | 391 | | |
| Green | Francis Locke | 196 | 5.49 | New |
| Registered electors | | 7,665 | | ▼50 |
| Turnout | | 3,618 | 47.20 | ▼3.71 |
| Rejected ballots | | 2 | 0.06 | ▼0.14 |
| Conservative hold | | | | |
| Conservative hold | | | | |

=== West Wickham North ===
West Wickham North (2)
| Party | Candidate | Votes | % | ±% |
|---|---|---|---|---|
| Conservative | Carole Hubbard* (Note: Hubbard replaced Cllr Blazey after their resignation in 1992) | 1,814 | 53.34 | ▼11.64 |
| Conservative | Brian Humphrys* | 1,779 | | |
| Liberal Democrats | Jennifer Fitch | 1,278 | 36.54 | ▲15.77 |
| Liberal Democrats | John Maydwell | 1,183 | | |
| Labour | Timothy Craddock | 358 | 10.12 | ▼4.13 |
| Labour | Gwendolen Pole | 323 | | |
| Registered electors | | 7,005 | | ▼49 |
| Turnout | | 3,504 | 50.02 | ▲0.83 |
| Rejected ballots | | 9 | 0.26 | ▲0.06 |
| Conservative hold | | | | |
| Conservative hold | | | | |

=== West Wickham South ===
West Wickham South (2)
| Party | Candidate | Votes | % | ±% |
|---|---|---|---|---|
| Conservative | John Gray* | 2,125 | 53.31 | ▼10.81 |
| Conservative | Leonard Tutt | 1,927 | | |
| Liberal Democrats | Graham Radford | 1,046 | 25.87 | ▲16.52 |
| Liberal Democrats | Gordon Stevens | 919 | | |
| Labour | Raymond Mooney | 491 | 12.87 | ▼0.97 |
| Labour | Jane Taylor | 486 | | |
| SDP | Richard Redden | 302 | 7.95 | ▼4.77 |
| Registered electors | | 7,857 | | ▲93 |
| Turnout | | 3,821 | 48.63 | ▼1.83 |
| Rejected ballots | | 6 | 0.16 | ▲0.03 |
| Conservative hold | | | | |
| Conservative hold | | | | |
