= Jean Tatham =

British politician

Member of Greater London Council for Orpington
- In office 1973–1986
- Preceded by: constituency established
- Succeeded by: constituency abolished

Personal details
- Political party: Conservative

Jean Tatham was a British politician from the Conservative Party who represented Orpington on the Greater London Council from 1973 to 1986.

She was leader of the Housing Management Committee. In a 1969 by-election, 1971 and 1974, she was elected on Bromley Council in Chelsfield ward.

== See also ==
- Members of the Greater London Council
- List of Greater London Council committee chairs
