= South Street, Bromley =

Coordinates: 51.297564°N 0.051799°E

South Street
- Location within Greater London
- London borough: Bromley
- Ceremonial county: Greater London
- Region: London
- Country: England
- Sovereign state: United Kingdom
- Post town: WESTERHAM
- Postcode district: TN16
- Dialling code: 01959
- Police: Metropolitan
- Fire: London
- Ambulance: London
- London Assembly: Bexley and Bromley

South Street is a hamlet in the far south of the London Borough of Bromley, 16.5 miles (27 km) south south-east from Charing Cross. It is the highest settlement in all of the London Region, averaging about 220 metres (722 ft) above sea level. It is about 1 km east of the larger settlement of Tatsfield, and about 5 miles (8 km) from Junction 5 of the M25, and lies outside London's contiguous built-up area. The hamlet lies along the A233 road, which connects Biggin Hill with the A25 near Westerham.

The area is now commonly known as Westerham Hill. Part of Westerham Hill is the highest point in Greater London, and like much of the North Downs its southern face (one mile south of South Street) is quite steep, being an escarpment. The south face here is in Kent.

Historically, South Street's main crops were strawberries, which were sold at Covent Garden; and grass for grazing (pasture) and haymaking. Livestock, including sheep and cattle, was another main source of agricultural income. A horse show was held and a stud farm previously existed in the area.
