= 1974 Bromley London Borough Council election =

The 1974 Bromley Council election took place on 2 May 1974 to elect members of Bromley London Borough Council in London, England. The whole council was up for election and the Conservative Party stayed in overall control of the council.

== Ward results ==
=== Beckenham ===
Anerley (2)
Party	Candidate	Votes	%	±%
Labour	Mrs M I F Harvey*			
Labour	Christopher Richard Gaster*			
Conservative	D S Fryer			
Conservative	Miss B E V Willmott			
Liberal	Nicholas J Gardner			
Liberal	S B Keen			
Majority				
Turnout				
Labour hold		Swing	+	

Clock House (2)
Party	Candidate	Votes	%	±%
Labour	Mrs Olga L Roberts*			
Labour	R G West	1,222		
Conservative	A R Milne	1,129		
Conservative	Michael John B Tickner			
Liberal	Mrs S M Tatham			
Liberal	C J Harte			
Majority				
Turnout				
Labour hold		Swing		

Copers Cope (2)
Party	Candidate	Votes	%	±%
Conservative	John L Pritchard			
Conservative	Charles George Priest*	1,631		
Independent	C Pym	790		
Liberal	Jeremy V Cope	499		
Liberal	Mrs K R Chapman			
Labour	Mrs Pauline M Jones			
Labour	Eric H Turner			
Turnout				
Conservative hold		Swing		

Eden Park (2)
Party	Candidate	Votes	%	±%
Conservative	Maurice J Mason*			
Conservative	Francis J D Cooke			
Liberal	Derek G Brent			
Liberal	Mrs Leslie E Brent			
Labour	Richard Richards			
Labour	R V H Mirkellian			
Turnout				
Conservative hold		Swing		

Lawrie Park & Kent House (2)
Party	Candidate	Votes	%	±%
Conservative	Richard D Foister*			
Conservative	A G F Mitchell*			−
Labour	Miss Janet I Ambrose		36.1	+
Labour	R H Mapstone			
Liberal	William Alan Macdonald MacCormick			−
Liberal	Mrs J Sanders			
Turnout				
Conservative hold		Swing		

Manor House (2)
Party	Candidate	Votes	%	±%
Liberal	David Edward Aubrey Crowe	1,407	43.2	+4.6
Liberal	Heather Isabel Donovan	1,337		
Conservative	H J Palmer	1,251	38.4	−4.7
Conservative	R C Carter	1,246		
Labour	Michael A Keenoy	598	18.4	+0.2
Labour	B J Sweeney	512		
Majority			4.8	9.3
Turnout			44.3	−2.4
Liberal gain from Conservative		Swing	+4.6	

Penge (2)
Party	Candidate	Votes	%	±%
Labour	Arthur J Mansfield			
Labour	Barbara Pedley*			
Conservative	J P Lawson			
Conservative	G Aczel			
Liberal	Henry A Verlander			
Liberal	P F Khan-Panni			
Turnout				
Labour hold		Swing		

Shortlands (2)
Party	Candidate	Votes	%	±%
Conservative	A E Read*			
Conservative	Bernard E G Davis*			
Liberal	Ian Phillips			
Liberal	R F Lloyd			
Labour	Ian M Haig			
Labour	Gareth B Matthewson			
Turnout				
Conservative hold		Swing		

=== Chislehurst ===
Bickley (3)
Party	Candidate	Votes	%	±%
Conservative	Maurice Bentley Kenward*			
Conservative	Hector McDonald			
Conservative	Simon J C Randall*			
Liberal	M B Goodwin			
Labour	Walter Kenneth Mansfield			
Liberal	Paul David A Nash			
Labour	Mrs Gwendoline I Mansfield			
Liberal	Mrs C B Cama			
Labour	R P Spencer			
Turnout				
Conservative hold		Swing		

Chislehurst (3)
Party	Candidate	Votes	%	±%
Conservative	A F Parkinson*			
Conservative	Joan Bryant			
Conservative	Charles Christopher Seward Reeves*			
Labour	Mrs L J Courtneidge			
Labour	Harold Taylor			
Labour	J McHendry			
Liberal	Mrs M Corderoy			
Liberal	Stephen R Walls			
Liberal	D K Grove			
Turnout				
Conservative hold		Swing		

Mottingham (2)
Party	Candidate	Votes	%	±%
Labour	Alistair Huistean Macdonald*			
Labour	Ronald William Huzzard*			
Conservative	M P Dean			
Conservative	T P Dabrowski			
Liberal	R S Weedon			
Liberal	J Dulieu			
Turnout				
Labour hold		Swing		

Plaistow & Sundridge (3)
Party	Candidate	Votes	%	±%
Conservative	Joan Kathleen Wykes*			
Conservative	Richard B Jackson			
Conservative	Arthur J Wilkinson			
Labour	S G Tennant			
Labour	Richard Henry Redden			
Labour	Mrs Judith E Armstrong			
Liberal	John R Hassall			
Liberal	Ivor W Fyfe			
Liberal	Peter Alan Janikoun			
Turnout				
Conservative hold		Swing		

St Paul's Cray (3)
Party	Candidate	Votes	%	±%
Labour	D Sanderson			
Labour	D W Edwards*			
Labour	Edgar C H Smith*			
Conservative	Geoffrey H Fennell			
Conservative	Mrs Violet C Hammond			
Conservative	Albert E Stayte			
Liberal	George H Watson			
Liberal	Mrs V K Day			
Liberal	Nicholas J Rowden			
Turnout				
Labour hold		Swing		

=== Orpington ===
Biggin Hill (2)
Party	Candidate	Votes	%	±%
Conservative	Mrs Marjorie C McClure*			
Conservative	Derek E Saunders*	1,505		
Liberal	C Deans	1,017		
Liberal	Mrs H M Heatley			
Labour	Roy E Hodsdon			
Labour	Mrs D M Hodsdon			
Turnout				
Conservative hold		Swing		

Chelsfield (3)
Party	Candidate	Votes	%	±%
Conservative	Jean Tatham*			
Conservative	D E Johnson			
Liberal	J W Cook			
Liberal	W J Ashworth			
Labour	K R Pike			
Labour	Mrs G R McKeown			
Turnout				
Conservative gain from Liberal		Swing		

Darwin (1)
Party	Candidate	Votes	%	±%
Conservative	Richard Alexander Knox-Johnston*	989		
Liberal	Derek J Goldsmith	589		
Labour	John E Goffe	153		
Turnout				
Conservative hold		Swing		

Farnborough (3)
Party	Candidate	Votes	%	±%
Conservative	Mrs Sheila M Stead*			
Conservative	Richard J Inniss*			
Conservative	K A Pawsey*			
Liberal	Keith O M Challis			
Liberal	Philip F Dearle			
Liberal	C Robert Rayner			
Labour	Philip R Edwards			
Labour	David I Grant			
Labour	C E Longley			
Turnout				
Conservative hold		Swing		

Goddington (3)
Party	Candidate	Votes	%	±%
Conservative	D A Heron			
Conservative	Joseph T Heath			
Conservative	J T Taylor			
Liberal	Mrs M Brasher			
Liberal	G G Peiser			
Liberal	R Bentley			
Labour	J Draper			
Labour	Mrs Catherine Spillane			
Labour	Keith S C Good			
Turnout				
Conservative gain from Liberal		Swing		

Petts Wood (3)
Party	Candidate	Votes	%	±%
Conservative	Joan Hatcher*			
Conservative	F J Packer*			
Conservative	Don D S Adams*			
Liberal	Edward Babbs			
Liberal	Christopher S Wilson			
Liberal	P W F Martin-Lawrence			
Labour	Mrs J E Woodhead			
Labour	Mrs E A Pindar			
Labour	G W Loveday			
Turnout				
Conservative hold		Swing		

St Mary Cray (3)
Party	Candidate	Votes	%	±%
Labour	Doris Partridge*			
Labour	Peter John Tozer			
Labour	E W White			
Conservative	Mrs J J Jordon			
Conservative	F C Vallender			
Conservative	J A Collins			
Liberal	A A Parfitt			
Liberal	M C Jackson			
Liberal	N F Kinchen			
Turnout				
Labour hold		Swing		

=== Ravensbourne ===
Bromley Common (3)
Party	Candidate	Votes	%	±%
Conservative	A R Dix	1,605		
Conservative	R E Hiskey	1,584		
Conservative	R C Gent	1,570		
Labour	Mrs Naomi V Carter*	1,566		
Labour	John Richard Holbrook	1,561		
Labour	A W Wright	1,529		
Liberal	D L Crawford	1,072		
Liberal	W Deakin	1,037		
Liberal	R W Timms	1,012		
Turnout				
Conservative gain from Labour		Swing		

Keston & Hayes (3)
Party	Candidate	Votes	%	±%
Conservative	Horace Walter Haden*			
Conservative	James F David*			
Conservative	Ernest Dennis Barkway*	2,578		
Liberal	William Ivor Shipley	1,776		
Liberal	Brian Harry Taylor			
Liberal	Mrs Patricia D Ebden			
Labour	Peter W Rance			
Labour	L Bishop			
Labour	J A Cook			
Turnout				
Conservative hold		Swing		

Martins Hill & Town (3)
Party	Candidate	Votes	%	±%
Conservative	William F D Walker*			
Conservative	Anthony Millar Wilkinson*			
Conservative	R J Atkins			
Labour	Gordon Thomas Yates			
Labour	Mrs K Lusty			
Labour	Mrs H Hill			
Liberal	Mrs M M Coulson			
Liberal	M F D'Souza			
Liberal	Philip E Dewdney			
Turnout				
Conservative hold		Swing		

West Wickham North (2)
Party	Candidate	Votes	%	±%
Conservative	Montague I Blasey*			
Conservative	P C Read			
Liberal	Peter A Dodsworth			
Liberal	Mrs Susan A Taylor			
Labour	Robert Armstrong			
Labour	Mrs Celia Nortcliff			
Turnout				
Conservative hold		Swing		

West Wickham South (2)
Party	Candidate	Votes	%	±%
Conservative	B G Cope			
Conservative	Kenneth V Crask*			
Liberal	W E Radcliffe			
Liberal	Alan G Sewell			
Labour	R A Lusty			
Labour	M J J Regan			
Turnout				
Conservative hold		Swing		
