= 2002 Bromley London Borough Council election =

2002 local election in England

Map of the results of the 2002 Bromley council election. Conservatives in blue, Labour in red and Liberal Democrats in yellow.

The Bromley Council election of 2002 took place on 2 May, coinciding with 174 other council elections across Britain. The election saw the Conservatives make sweeping gains after losing power in 1998 to a Liberal-Labour coalition.

== Election Summary ==
Bromley local election result 2002
Party	Seats	Gains	Losses	Net gain/loss	Seats %	Votes %	Votes	+/−
Conservative	41			+9	68.3	50.5	42,511	
Liberal Democrats	13			-9	21.7	32.6	27,387	
Labour	6			0	10.0	14.1	11,891	
Green	0			0	0	1.2	1,003	
UKIP	0			0	0	1.0	818	
National Front	0			0	0	0.2	192	
Liberal	0			0	0	0.2	176	
CPA	0			0	0	0.2	135	

== Ward results ==
Bickley (3)
Party	Candidate	Votes	%	±%
Conservative	Gordon Jenkins	2,756		
Conservative	Ingrid Buckley	2,753		
Conservative	Catherine Rideout	2,707		
Liberal Democrats	Brian Taylor	683		
Liberal Democrats	Margaret Ayres	681		
Liberal Democrats	Derek Gambell	599		
Labour	Susan Cox	492		
Labour	Christopher Clough	478		
Labour	Arthur Johnson	445		
Turnout		3,999	36.5	

Biggin Hill (2)
Party	Candidate	Votes	%	±%
Liberal Democrats	Geoffrey Gostt	1,432		
Liberal Democrats	Walter Shekyls	1,402		
Conservative	Gordon Norrie	1,139		
Conservative	Matthew Phipps	993		
UKIP	Arthur Holmans	132		
Labour	Keith Galley	124		
Labour	Brendan French	121		
Turnout		2,783	36.1	
Liberal Democrats hold				
Liberal Democrats hold				
