= 1968 Bromley London Borough Council election =

The 1968 Bromley Council election took place on 9 May 1968 to elect members of Bromley London Borough Council in London, England. The whole council was up for election and the Conservative party stayed in overall control of the council.

== Ward results ==
=== Beckenham ===
Anerley (2)
Party	Candidate	Votes	%	±%
Conservative	Mrs M M Blackburn	963	48.2	+9.7
Conservative	B D F Bennett	899		
Labour	Mrs M I F Harvey	819	41.0	−7.9
Labour	Mrs. M. M. Read*	764		
Liberal	Mrs J G Offord	214	10.7	+0.4
Liberal	Charles S Vassie	212		
Turnout				
Conservative gain from Labour		Swing		

Clock House (2)
Party	Candidate	Votes	%	±%
Conservative	M. C. Higgins*			
Conservative	R White			
Labour	Mrs. Olga L. Roberts*			
Labour	D C Carter			
Liberal	Mrs W G Evans			
Liberal	R A Newton			
Turnout				
Conservative gain from Labour		Swing		

Copers Cope (2)
Party	Candidate	Votes	%	±%
Conservative	P. J. J. Higgins*			
Conservative	H J Palmer			
Liberal	E W T Gilbert			
Liberal	Jeremy V. Cope			
Labour	S W Mayne			
Turnout				
Conservative hold		Swing		

Eden Park (2)
Party	Candidate	Votes	%	±%
Conservative	Mrs. M. J. Higgins*			
Conservative	R D Gregory			
Liberal	Heather Isabel Donovan			
Liberal	Mrs J Sanders			
Labour	Mrs E Belsey			
Labour	Mrs J M Eames			
Turnout				
Conservative hold		Swing		

Lawrie Park & Kent House (2)
Party	Candidate	Votes	%	±%
Conservative	Richard D. Foister*		72.5	
Conservative	A. G. F. Mitchell*			
Labour	D R Roberts		13.8	
Liberal	Mrs H N Hogg		13.7	
Labour	R L Miller			
Liberal	R J Adamson			
Turnout				
Conservative hold		Swing		

Manor House (2)
Party	Candidate	Votes	%	±%
Conservative	Francis J D Cooke*	1,859		
Conservative	M E Forster	1,851		
Liberal	David Edward Aubrey Crowe	1,564		
Liberal	Ian Phillips	1,498		
Labour	R J Irwin	287		
Labour	Mrs M R Bowyer	287		
Turnout				
Conservative hold		Swing		

Penge (3)
Party	Candidate	Votes	%	±%
Conservative	Charles George Priest			
Conservative	Miss K M Candy			
Conservative	C R E Kember			
Labour	H. J. F Harvey*			
Labour	J. H. Read			
Labour	Barbara Pedley			
Liberal	William Huckin			
Liberal	J L Wheeler			
Liberal	A J B Whitelocke			
Independent	A F S Bolland			
Turnout				
Conservative gain from Labour		Swing		

Shortlands (2)
Party	Candidate	Votes	%	±%
Conservative	Alfred T. Johnson*			
Conservative	A E Read			
Liberal	J Bratt			
Liberal	John R Canvin			
Labour	Dr Jan Pollert			
Turnout				
Conservative hold		Swing		

West Wickham North (2)
Party	Candidate	Votes	%	±%
Conservative	Montague I Blasey			
Conservative	E. R. Smithers*			
Liberal	Peter A. Dodsworth			
Liberal	Mrs J I Alexander			
Labour	Mrs B J Roberts			
Labour	Christopher Richard Gaster			
Turnout				
Conservative hold		Swing		

West Wickham South (2)
Party	Candidate	Votes	%	±%
Conservative	Kathleen Agnes Moore*			
Conservative	Kenneth V. Crask*			
Liberal	J E Jewell			
Liberal	Mrs L M Hudson			
Turnout				
Conservative hold		Swing		

=== Bromley ===
Bromley Common (3)
Party	Candidate	Votes	%	±%
Conservative	Simon J C Randall			
Conservative	M G Law			
Conservative	Clive A L Brangwin			
Labour	Mrs. Naomi V. Carter*			
Labour	John Douglas Grant			
Labour	A. W Wright*			
Liberal	T J Gillespie			
Liberal	M J Edney			
Liberal	E J Stott			
Independent	A S J Duff			
Communist	Mrs E E Becow			
Turnout				
Conservative gain from Labour		Swing		

Keston & Hayes (3)
Party	Candidate	Votes	%	±%
Conservative	Horace Walter Haden*	3,026		
Conservative	James F. David*	2,869		
Conservative	Ernest Dennis Barkway	2,860		
Liberal	William Ivor Shipley	2,144		
Liberal	Brian Harry Taylor	2,057		
Liberal	Mrs D E Richmond	1,770		
Labour	Mrs D M Wright	281		
Labour	E Corbett	217		
Labour	Miss W E Cooper	191		
Turnout				
Conservative hold		Swing		

Martins Hill & Town (3)
Party	Candidate	Votes	%	±%
Conservative	Anthony Millar Wilkinson			
Conservative	W H Stephenson			
Conservative	Charles W Wilmot*			
Liberal	A V Luff			
Liberal	Walter Edward Philip Babbs			
Liberal	Mrs M M Coulson			
Labour	Miss D E Wickham			
Labour	Gordon Thomas Yates			
Labour	K W Bennison			
Turnout				
Conservative hold		Swing		

Plaistow & Sundridge (3)
Party	Candidate	Votes	%	±%
Conservative	D. J. W. Eves*			
Conservative	R W Spon-Smith			
Conservative	R. A. Upton*			
Labour	Mrs D E Gallagher			
Labour	K A Munro			
Labour	C J Christopher			
Liberal	L Craddock			
Liberal	Miss A M Boot			
Liberal	D Rowe			
Independent	K L Bailey			
Turnout				
Conservative hold		Swing		

=== Chislehurst ===
Bickley (3)
Party	Candidate	Votes	%	±%
Conservative	A E Cox			
Conservative	Maurice Bentley Kenward			
Conservative	Michael Jon Neubert			
Liberal	W. Holliday			
Liberal	W R Edwards			
Liberal	D Hawes-Richards			
Labour	Mrs E Leys			
Labour	R Goss			
Labour	K E Axon			
Turnout				
Conservative hold		Swing		

Chislehurst (3)
Party	Candidate	Votes	%	±%
Conservative	B D Farmer			
Conservative	Charles Christopher Seward Reeves			
Conservative	A F Parkinson			
Labour	Harold Taylor			
Labour	Edgar C H Smith			
Liberal	G R Ellis			
Labour	Miss P A Lathey			
Liberal	Mrs J M Minter			
Liberal	J Dulieu			
Turnout				
Conservative hold		Swing		

Mottingham (2)
Party	Candidate	Votes	%	±%
Labour	Ronald William Huzzard			
Labour	J. P. Sheridan*			
Conservative	J D Thomas			
Conservative	T F Bonwick			
Liberal	R I Thompson			
Liberal	R J Payne			
Turnout				
Labour hold		Swing		

St Paul's Cray (3)
Party	Candidate	Votes	%	±%
Labour	Raymond Alexander Sanderson*			
Labour	C E Stickings			
Labour	H J Belsey			
Conservative	Albert E. Stayte			
Conservative	Geoffrey H. Fennell			
Conservative	N A Row			
Liberal	Miss J. Furlanger			
Liberal	C E Day			
Liberal	E M McGuigan			
Communist	J. F Perham			
Turnout				
Labour hold		Swing		

=== Orpington ===
Biggin Hill (2)
Party	Candidate	Votes	%	±%
Conservative	Mrs. Marjorie C. McClure*	1,614		
Conservative	Derek E. Saunders*	1,586		
Liberal	Philip Alan Golding	886		
Liberal	J G E Williams	827		
Labour	E J (Jack) Townsend	170		
Labour	Miss C M Squire	144		
Turnout				
Conservative hold		Swing		

Chelsfield (2)
Party	Candidate	Votes	%	±%
Conservative	Dr J A Mansi	2,112		
Liberal	Patrick McNally*	1,994		
Conservative	C L Burgess	1,860		
Liberal	Michael Edwardes-Evans	1,804		
Labour	G Fielding	147		
Labour	Mrs G M Ford	138		
Turnout				
Conservative gain from Liberal		Swing		

Darwin (1)
Party	Candidate	Votes	%	±%
Conservative	Christopher David Mchenry Knox-Johnston*	1,007		
Liberal	Mrs Joyce M Carter	622		
Labour	G. A. Cox	38		
Turnout				
Conservative hold		Swing		

Farnborough (3)
Party	Candidate	Votes	%	±%
Conservative	Mrs Sheila M Stead*			
Conservative	K A Pawsey			
Conservative	Mrs A M White			
Liberal	E A G Morris			
Liberal	Mrs E P Salmon			
Liberal	N R Brice			
Labour	Miss M J Healy			
Labour	J O McKeown			
Labour	D A Tytler			
Turnout				
Conservative hold		Swing		

Goddington (3)
Party	Candidate	Votes	%	±%
Conservative	R A Davies	2,976		
Conservative	D A Heron	2,933		
Conservative	A J Day	2,916		
Liberal	P. A. R. Allwood*	2,695		
Liberal	J R Howitt	2,635		
Liberal	C. Robert Rayner	2,616		
Labour	S T Lack	212		
Labour	Gustav C White	201		
Labour	V G Upson	192		
Turnout				
Conservative gain from Liberal		Swing		

Petts Wood (3)
Party	Candidate	Votes	%	±%
Conservative	Henry Thomas Cox			
Conservative	Don D S Adams			
Conservative	F. J. Packer*			
Liberal	P A Gooch			
Liberal	Byrom Lees			
Liberal	Keith H Lock			
Labour	Mrs L L Lack			
Labour	W B Deller			
Labour	J McHendry			
Turnout				
Conservative hold		Swing		

St Mary Cray (2)
Party	Candidate	Votes	%	±%
Liberal	Ernest James Lovell*	1,590		
Liberal	A A Parfitt	1,510		
Conservative	K I Harding	1,222		
Conservative	Miss S M N Gready	1,167		
Labour	Mrs B M E Cox	470		
Labour	B Dibb	460		
Turnout				
Liberal hold		Swing		
