= 1971 Bromley London Borough Council election =

The 1971 Bromley Council election took place on 13 May 1971 to elect members of Bromley London Borough Council in London, England. The whole council was up for election and the Conservative party stayed in overall control of the council.

== Ward results ==
=== Beckenham ===
Anerley (2)
| Party | Candidate | Votes | % | ±% |
|---|---|---|---|---|
| Labour | Mrs M I F Harvey | | 68.0 | +27.0 |
| Labour | Christopher Richard Gaster | 1,727 | | |
| Conservative | Mrs M M Blackburn* | 741 | 28.3 | −19.9 |
| Conservative | J Burnip | | | |
| Liberal | P J Dover | | 3.7 | −7.0 |
| Liberal | Charles S Vassie | | | |
| Majority | | | 39.6 | |
| Turnout | | | 35.6 | |
| Labour gain from Conservative | | Swing | +23.5 | |

Clock House (2)
| Party | Candidate | Votes | % | ±% |
|---|---|---|---|---|
| Labour | Mrs. Olga L. Roberts | | | |
| Labour | D C Carter | | | |
| Conservative | C R E Kember | | | |
| Conservative | R F Newson | | | |
| Liberal | Paul David A Nash | | | |
| Liberal | Mrs E B George | | | |
| Majority | | | | |
| Turnout | | | | |
| Labour gain from Conservative | | Swing | | |

Copers Cope (2)
| Party | Candidate | Votes | % | ±% |
|---|---|---|---|---|
| Conservative | H J Palmer* | | | |
| Conservative | Charles George Priest | | | |
| Labour | B R Kidson | | | |
| Labour | H E Smith | | | |
| Liberal | Jeremy V. Cope | | | |
| Liberal | E W T Gilbert | | | |
| Turnout | | | | |
| Conservative hold | | Swing | | |

Eden Park (2)
| Party | Candidate | Votes | % | ±% |
|---|---|---|---|---|
| Conservative | Maurice J Mason | | | |
| Conservative | R J Kellaway | | | |
| Liberal | Mrs R Dale | | | |
| Liberal | G B Swinyard | | | |
| Labour | Mrs B J Roberts | | | |
| Labour | Mrs J I Ambrose | | | |
| Turnout | | | | |
| Conservative hold | | Swing | | |

Lawrie Park & Kent House (2)
| Party | Candidate | Votes | % | ±% |
|---|---|---|---|---|
| Conservative | A. G. F. Mitchell* | | 51.9 | −20.6 |
| Conservative | Richard D. Foister* | | | |
| Labour | J H O'Keefe | | 13.8 | +29.0 |
| Labour | S W Mayne | | | |
| Liberal | Heather Isabel Donovan | | 5.3 | −8.4 |
| Liberal | B E Burbage | | | |
| Turnout | | | | |
| Conservative hold | | Swing | | |

Manor House (2)
| Party | Candidate | Votes | % | ±% |
|---|---|---|---|---|
| Conservative | M E Forster* | 1,501 | | |
| Conservative | D W Giffin | 1,482 | | |
| Liberal | David Edward Aubrey Crowe | 1,344 | | |
| Liberal | Ian Phillips | 1,343 | | |
| Labour | Mrs C A Hughes | 634 | | |
| Labour | M A Keenoy | 600 | | |
| Turnout | | | | |
| Conservative hold | | Swing | | |

Penge (2)
| Party | Candidate | Votes | % | ±% |
|---|---|---|---|---|
| Labour | H. J. F Harvey | | | |
| Labour | Barbara Pedley | | | |
| Conservative | C J W Bunn | | | |
| Conservative | R C Carter | | | |
| Liberal | R J Payne | | | |
| Liberal | R I Thompson | | | |
| Turnout | | | | |
| Labour gain from Conservative | | Swing | | |

Shortlands (2)
| Party | Candidate | Votes | % | ±% |
|---|---|---|---|---|
| Conservative | A E Read* | | | |
| Conservative | Bernard E G Davis* | | | |
| Labour | Mrs H Lawton | | | |
| Labour | Ian William Wrigglesworth | | | |
| Liberal | P A Upson | | | |
| Liberal | John R Canvin | | | |
| Turnout | | | | |
| Conservative hold | | Swing | | |

West Wickham North (2)
| Party | Candidate | Votes | % | ±% |
|---|---|---|---|---|
| Conservative | E. R. Smithers* | | | |
| Conservative | Montague I Blasey* | | | |
| Liberal | Peter A. Dodsworth | | | |
| Liberal | T D Eastop | | | |
| Labour | Miss E M Ridgeway | | | |
| Labour | N J Sharp | | | |
| Turnout | | | | |
| Conservative hold | | Swing | | |

West Wickham South (2)
| Party | Candidate | Votes | % | ±% |
|---|---|---|---|---|
| Conservative | Kenneth V. Crask* | | | |
| Conservative | St J E F Ward | | | |
| Liberal | Mrs L M Hudson | | | |
| Liberal | J E Jewell | | | |
| Labour | R Richards | | | |
| Labour | Mrs L H Vandelt | | | |
| Turnout | | | | |
| Conservative hold | | Swing | | |

=== Bromley ===
Bromley Common (3)
| Party | Candidate | Votes | % | ±% |
|---|---|---|---|---|
| Labour | Mrs. Naomi V. Carter | | | |
| Conservative | Simon J C Randall* | | | |
| Conservative | M G Law* | | | |
| Labour | A. W Wright | | | |
| Labour | H H R Shortlands | | | |
| Conservative | Clive A L Brangwin* | | | |
| Liberal | Terence Frank Clark | | | |
| Liberal | T J Gillespie | | | |
| Liberal | M J Edney | | | |
| Independent | Mrs A Gully | | | |
| Turnout | | | | |
| Labour gain from Conservative | | Swing | | |

Keston & Hayes (3)
| Party | Candidate | Votes | % | ±% |
|---|---|---|---|---|
| Conservative | Horace Walter Haden* | | | |
| Conservative | James F. David* | | | |
| Conservative | Ernest Dennis Barkway* | | | |
| Liberal | Brian Harry Taylor | | | |
| Liberal | Mrs D E Richmond | | | |
| Liberal | Richard D Hawes | | | |
| Labour | L Bishop | | | |
| Labour | Mrs D M Wright | | | |
| Labour | E Corbett | | | |
| Turnout | | | | |
| Conservative hold | | Swing | | |

Martins Hill & Town (3)
| Party | Candidate | Votes | % | ±% |
|---|---|---|---|---|
| Conservative | W F D Walker | | | |
| Conservative | W H Stephenson* | | | |
| Conservative | Anthony Millar Wilkinson* | | | |
| Labour | Mrs P A Freedman | | | |
| Labour | R B Freedman | | | |
| Labour | Gordon Thomas Yates | | | |
| Liberal | P E Dewdney | | | |
| Liberal | Mrs M M Coulson | | | |
| Turnout | | | | |
| Conservative hold | | Swing | | |

Plaistow & Sundridge (3)
| Party | Candidate | Votes | % | ±% |
|---|---|---|---|---|
| Conservative | D. J. W. Eves* | | | |
| Conservative | A E Friday | | | |
| Conservative | Joan Kathleen Wykes | | | |
| Labour | Richard Henry Redden | | | |
| Labour | R Goss | | | |
| Labour | D R Roberts | | | |
| Liberal | K L Page | | | |
| Liberal | D C Pike | | | |
| Liberal | M J Sartin | | | |
| Independent | K L Bailey | | | |
| Turnout | | | | |
| Conservative hold | | Swing | | |

=== Chislehurst ===
Bickley (3)
| Party | Candidate | Votes | % | ±% |
|---|---|---|---|---|
| Conservative | Maurice Bentley Kenward* | | | |
| Conservative | J Smith* | | | |
| Conservative | A E Cox* | | | |
| Labour | Mrs J Wood | | | |
| Labour | Walter K Mansfield | | | |
| Labour | D G Chiles | | | |
| Turnout | | | | |
| Conservative hold | | Swing | | |

Chislehurst (3)
| Party | Candidate | Votes | % | ±% |
|---|---|---|---|---|
| Conservative | A F Parkinson* | | | |
| Conservative | Charles Christopher Seward Reeves* | | | |
| Conservative | Joan Bryant | | | |
| Labour | Harold Taylor | | | |
| Labour | Mrs L J Courtneidge | | | |
| Labour | J McHendry | | | |
| Liberal | J Dulieu | | | |
| Liberal | Mrs J M Minter | | | |
| Liberal | M A Minter | | | |
| Turnout | | | | |
| Conservative hold | | Swing | | |

Mottingham (2)
| Party | Candidate | Votes | % | ±% |
|---|---|---|---|---|
| Labour | Alistair Huistean Macdonald | | | |
| Labour | Ronald William Huzzard* | | | |
| Conservative | J D Thomas | | | |
| Conservative | G F Haines | | | |
| Communist | D N Goss | | | |
| Turnout | | | | |
| Labour hold | | Swing | | |

St Paul's Cray (3)
| Party | Candidate | Votes | % | ±% |
|---|---|---|---|---|
| Labour | Raymond Alexander Sanderson* | | | |
| Labour | Edgar C H Smith | | | |
| Labour | D W Edwards* | | | |
| Conservative | Albert E. Stayte | | | |
| Conservative | Geoffrey H. Fennell | | | |
| Conservative | Mrs V C Hammond | | | |
| Liberal | Mrs A M Parfitt | | | |
| Liberal | J J Hart | | | |
| Liberal | T J Potter | | | |
| Turnout | | | | |
| Labour hold | | Swing | | |

=== Orpington ===
Biggin Hill (2)
| Party | Candidate | Votes | % | ±% |
|---|---|---|---|---|
| Conservative | Derek E. Saunders* | 1,597 | | |
| Conservative | Mrs. Marjorie C. McClure* | 1,594 | | |
| Liberal | Philip Alan Golding | 1,089 | | |
| Liberal | B. A. Beard | 990 | | |
| Labour | R. E. Hodsdon | 437 | | |
| Labour | E. J. (Jack) Townsend | 420 | | |
| Turnout | | | 51.4 | |
| Conservative hold | | Swing | | |

Chelsfield (2)
| Party | Candidate | Votes | % | ±% |
|---|---|---|---|---|
| Liberal | Patrick McNally* | 1,972 | | |
| Conservative | Jean Tatham* | 1,910 | | |
| Liberal | Mrs E B Luthwaite | 1,805 | | |
| Conservative | D E Johnson | 1,801 | | |
| Labour | J O McKeown | | | |
| Labour | Mrs G R McKeown | | | |
| Turnout | | | | |
| Liberal hold | | Swing | | |
| Conservative hold | | Swing | | |

Darwin (1)
| Party | Candidate | Votes | % | ±% |
|---|---|---|---|---|
| Conservative | Richard Alexander Knox-Johnston | 989 | | |
| Liberal | R P Townsend | 758 | | |
| Labour | G. A. Cox | 103 | | |
| Turnout | | | | |
| Conservative hold | | Swing | | |

Farnborough (3)
| Party | Candidate | Votes | % | ±% |
|---|---|---|---|---|
| Conservative | Mrs Sheila M Stead* | | | |
| Conservative | R J Inniss | | | |
| Conservative | K A Pawsey* | | | |
| Liberal | Philip F Dearle | | | |
| Liberal | Keith O M Challis | | | |
| Liberal | Mrs Kathleen E C Tarbolton | | | |
| Labour | J Fowler | | | |
| Labour | Mrs M J E Healy | | | |
| Labour | M J Tallantine | | | |
| Turnout | | | | |
| Conservative hold | | Swing | | |

Goddington (3)
| Party | Candidate | Votes | % | ±% |
|---|---|---|---|---|
| Liberal | Mrs E M Hart | 3,017 | | |
| Liberal | O K Williams | 2,969 | | |
| Liberal | M G C Anderson | 2,796 | | |
| Conservative | D A Heron* | 2,644 | | |
| Conservative | Mrs M L Kent | | | |
| Conservative | A R Hammonds | | | |
| Labour | I F H Low | | | |
| Labour | J H Lohmann | | | |
| Labour | W East | | | |
| Turnout | | | | |
| Liberal gain from Conservative | | Swing | | |

Petts Wood (3)
| Party | Candidate | Votes | % | ±% |
|---|---|---|---|---|
| Conservative | F. J. Packer* | | | |
| Conservative | Joan Hatcher | | | |
| Conservative | Don D S Adams* | | | |
| Liberal | P A Gooch | | | |
| Liberal | J G Bungay | | | |
| Liberal | R W Sutton | | | |
| Labour | Mrs B M E Cox | | | |
| Labour | R E C Harris | | | |
| Labour | S T Lack | | | |
| Turnout | | | | |
| Conservative hold | | Swing | | |

St Mary Cray (3)
| Party | Candidate | Votes | % | ±% |
|---|---|---|---|---|
| Labour | John Francis Spellar* | 2,517 | | |
| Labour | Doris Partridge | 2,439 | | |
| Labour | Mrs M A Goffe | 2,349 | | |
| Liberal | Roy Edey* | 1,418 | | |
| Liberal | Michael Edwards-Evans | 1,317 | | |
| Conservative | J A Collins | 1,298 | | |
| Liberal | Mrs F J Clark | 1,295 | | |
| Conservative | R G Westcombe | 1,265 | | |
| Conservative | G S Edwards | 1,257 | | |
| Turnout | | | | |
| Labour gain from Liberal | | Swing | | |
