= 1964 Bromley London Borough Council election =

The 1964 Bromley Council election took place on 7 May 1964 to elect members of Bromley London Borough Council in London, England. The whole council was up for election and the Conservative party gained control of the council.

== Background ==
These elections were the first to the newly formed borough. Previously elections had taken place in the Municipal Borough of Beckenham, Municipal Borough of Bromley, Chislehurst and Sidcup Urban District, Orpington Urban District and Penge Urban District. These boroughs and districts were joined to form the new London Borough of Bromley by the London Government Act 1963.

A total of 187 candidates stood in the election for the 60 seats being contested across 25 wards. These included a full slate from the Conservative and Labour parties, while the Liberals stood 56 candidates. Other candidates included 9 from the Communist party and 2 Independent Conservatives. There were 13 two-seat wards, 11 three-seat wards and 1 single-seat ward.

This election had aldermen as well as directly elected councillors. The Conservatives got 7 aldermen, Labour 2 and the Liberals 1.

The Council was elected in 1964 as a "shadow authority" but did not start operations until 1 April 1965.

== Election result ==
The results saw the Conservatives gain the new council with a majority of 16 after winning 38 of the 60 seats. Overall turnout in the election was 47.8%. This turnout included 1,803 postal votes.

Bromley Borough Council election, 1964
Party	Seats	Seats %	Votes %	Votes	Candidates
Conservative	38	63.3	47.5	108,687	57
Labour	17	25.0	25.9	59,401	56
Liberal	7	11.7	25.5	58,316	53
Ind. Conservative	0	0.0	0.8	1,733	9
Communist	0	0.0	0.3	774	9

== Ward results ==
Anerley (2)
Party	Candidate	Votes	%	±%
Labour	Alistair Huistean Macdonald	1,092		
Labour	Mrs. M. M. Read	1,064		
Conservative	J. R. Piper	851		
Conservative	C. B. Berwick	842		
Liberal	Mrs. G. Read	230		
Liberal	A. G. Baylis	225		
Communist	J. M. Bloom	51		
Turnout		2,236	36.7	
Labour win (new seat)				

Bickley (3)
Party	Candidate	Votes	%	±%
Conservative	Francis George V Lovell	2,822		
Conservative	Ralph N. Allen	2,797		
Conservative	C. L. Smith	2,785		
Liberal	Mrs. Beryl Babbs	1,172		
Liberal	C. Griesel	1,137		
Liberal	W. Holliday	1,102		
Labour	E. Allan	562		
Labour	J. D. Grant	545		
Labour	G. Walker	528		
Turnout		4,542	44.9	
Conservative win (new seat)				

Biggin Hill (2)
Party	Candidate	Votes	%	±%
Conservative	Derek E. Saunders	964		
Conservative	Mrs. Marjorie C. McClure	962		
Liberal	Philip Alan Golding	739		
Liberal	Wilfred J. Ashworth	659		
Communist	Patrick Alan Sloan	155		
Labour	William John Mulligan	137		
Labour	T. A. Pullen	120		
Turnout		1,936	52.4	
Conservative win (new seat)				

Bromley Common (3)
Party	Candidate	Votes	%	±%
Labour	Mrs Louise Mary Prince	1,931		
Labour	Mrs. Naomi V. Carter	1,768		
Labour	A W Wright	1,750		
Conservative	Michael Jon Neubert	1,565		
Conservative	William Bert Ruth	1,551		
Conservative	Mrs. P. M. Clough	1,517		
Liberal	Mrs. J. Moir	545		
Liberal	G. T. Howe	537		
Liberal	E. F. Scott	521		
Turnout		4,039	40.3	
Labour win (new seat)				

Chelsfield (2)
Party	Candidate	Votes	%	±%
Liberal	Patrick McNally	1,659		
Liberal	Mrs. Christine A. Parker	1,646		
Conservative	Mrs. Jean L. Tatham	1,485		
Conservative	J. R. Mason	1,472		
Labour	A. J. Lathey	332		
Labour	D. E. Lack	331		
Turnout		3,506	59.3	
Liberal win (new seat)				

Chislehurst (3)
Party	Candidate	Votes	%	±%
Conservative	Sybil Marian Gunn	3,158		
Conservative	Bertha Holland James	3,113		
Conservative	G. H. Scobie	3,090		
Labour	Harold Taylor	960		
Labour	Charles Edward Wiltshire	974		
Labour	H. Belsey	951		
Liberal	Dr. R. Moore	623		
Liberal	W. Cook	564		
Liberal	P. Ellis	538		
Turnout		4,708	46.6	
Conservative win (new seat)				

Clock House (2)
Party	Candidate	Votes	%	±%
Labour	Arthur J. Mansfield	1,425		
Labour	Mrs. Olga L. Roberts	1,421		
Conservative	M. C. Higgins	972		
Conservative	J. H. Burson	922		
Liberal	P. A. Upson	601		
Liberal	Mrs. W. G. Evans	575		
Turnout		3,043	51.2	
Labour win (new seat)				

Copers Cope (2)
Party	Candidate	Votes	%	±%
Conservative	P. J. J. Higgins	1,237		
Conservative	Miss B. G. Oldham	1,218		
Ind. Conservative	A. W. Halse	895		
Ind. Conservative	George Charles William White	838		
Liberal	Mrs. V. M. D. Davis	507		
Liberal	Alfred Noel Humphris Blackburn	499		
Labour	Mrs. M. E. Sharrock	437		
Labour	D. C. Carter	373		
Turnout		3,038	45.2	
Conservative win (new seat)				

Darwin (1)
Party	Candidate	Votes	%	±%
Conservative	Arthur L. Ferris	782		
Liberal	Joseph W. Bray	673		
Labour	G. A. Cox	93		
Turnout		1,551	62.8	
Conservative win (new seat)				

Eden Park (2)
Party	Candidate	Votes	%	±%
Conservative	Alfred William Waller	1,763		
Conservative	Mrs. M. J. Higgins	1,710		
Liberal	P. Baker	1,011		
Liberal	R. F. Lloyd	1,005		
Labour	Mrs. L. M. Moelwyn Hughes	273		
Labour	M. J. Hamlyn	257		
Turnout		3,044	50.9	
Conservative win (new seat)				

Farnborough (3)
Party	Candidate	Votes	%	±%
Conservative	Mrs Sheila M Stead	2,839		
Conservative	L. Selwyn	2,763		
Conservative	E. P. Peter	2,753		
Liberal	Alfred Baldock Howard	1,935		
Liberal	A. J. Curry	1,874		
Liberal	John William Cook	1,862		
Labour	C. E. Stickings	538		
Labour	D. S. Mansell	477		
Labour	R. A. Whitfield	477		
Turnout		5,237	50.0	
Conservative win (new seat)				

Goddington (3)
Party	Candidate	Votes	%	±%
Liberal	P. K. Minton	2,605		
Liberal	Edward Charles Henry Jones	2,576		
Liberal	P. A. R. Allwood	2,474		
Conservative	J. E. Meacher	2,233		
Conservative	Mrs. E. D. Riley	2,186		
Conservative	Mrs. K. Wylde	2,150		
Labour	W. East	577		
Labour	B. Dibb	568		
Labour	H. Lewis	540		
Communist	Mrs. Z. Yardley	115		
Turnout		5,428	54.3	
Liberal win (new seat)				

Keston & Hayes (3)
Party	Candidate	Votes	%	±%
Conservative	Horace Walter Haden	2,391		
Conservative	James F. David	2,322		
Conservative	F. G. Austin	2,318		
Liberal	William Ivor Shipley	1,978		
Liberal	Brian Harry Taylor	1,921		
Liberal	L. Perks	1,729		
Labour	E. Corbett	371		
Labour	Mrs. D. M. Wright	367		
Labour	D. Ivings	338		
Turnout		4,643	50.9	
Conservative win (new seat)				

Lawrie Park & Kent House (2)
Party	Candidate	Votes	%	±%
Conservative	Richard D Foister	1,480	50.0	
Conservative	A. G. F. Mitchell	1,442		
Labour	A. S. J. Duff	928	31.4	
Labour	C. T. Carr	892		
Liberal	J. Finch	497	16.8	
Liberal	Peter A. Dodsworth	483		
Communist	C. A. E. Yardley	53	1.8	
Turnout		2,956	43.5	
Conservative win (new seat)				

Manor House (2)
Party	Candidate	Votes	%	±%
Conservative	Francis J D Cooke	1,420		
Conservative	R. Crofton	1,383		
Liberal	P. J. Dover	1,274		
Liberal	P. E. Bowden	1,230		
Labour	H. F. C. Shipham	736		
Labour	Miss G. H. Warrack	727		
Communist	D. W. Parker	50		
Turnout		3,453	48.9	
Conservative win (new seat)				

Martins Hill & Town (3)
Party	Candidate	Votes	%	±%
Conservative	P. Morley	1,985		
Conservative	Charles W Wilmot	1,984		
Conservative	Clifford Michael Baulf	1,979		
Liberal	J. Mumby	853		
Liberal	J. Greig	824		
Liberal	N.D.M. McGeorge	816		
Labour	D. Smith	745		
Labour	M. Bass	731		
Labour	W. Hollow	699		
Turnout		3,595	37.1	
Conservative win (new seat)				

Mottingham (2)
Party	Candidate	Votes	%	±%
Labour	R. Goss	2,564		
Labour	J. P. Sheridan	2,476		
Conservative	J. R. Giles	1,038		
Conservative	R. F. H. Vander	936		
Communist	R. Blackmore	108		
Turnout		3,616	48.9	
Labour win (new seat)				

Penge (3)
Party	Candidate	Votes	%	±%
Labour	D. G. Chiles	2,101		
Labour	J. H. Read	2,081		
Labour	H. J. Harvey	2,070		
Conservative	William Edwin Walton	1,648		
Conservative	Francis Augustus Smith	1,548		
Conservative	Charles George Priest	1,539		
Liberal	William Huckin	954		
Communist	J. A. Burkin	85		
Turnout		4,344	40.0	
Labour win (new seat)				

Petts Wood (3)
Party	Candidate	Votes	%	±%
Conservative	Mrs. Joan V. Webb	4,590		
Conservative	Charles Henry Ernst Pratt	4,554		
Conservative	F. J. Packer	4,494		
Liberal	Michael Edwardes-Evans	2,307		
Liberal	J. L. T. Walker	2,265		
Liberal	Mrs. Lois Wiggins	2,167		
Labour	D. J. W. Legg	821		
Labour	D. Knight	812		
Labour	C. E. Baker	689		
Turnout		7,691	60.0	
Conservative win (new seat)				

Plaistow & Sundridge (3)
Party	Candidate	Votes	%	±%
Conservative	R. Baker	2,615		
Conservative	D. J. W. Eves	2,570		
Conservative	R. A. Upton	2,536		
Labour	J.G. Booker	2,414		
Labour	F.F.W. Coates	2,205		
Labour	S. Tennant	2,193		
Liberal	D. Cutland	439		
Liberal	L. Guichard	419		
Liberal	B. Kelly	390		
Turnout		5,365	51.0	
Conservative win (new seat)				

St Mary Cray (2)
Party	Candidate	Votes	%	±%
Liberal	Ernest James Lovell	1,874		
Liberal	William J. Cain	1,725		
Labour	Frederick William Lane	1,592		
Labour	William John Tarry	1,517		
Conservative	Roger Edward Sims	750		
Conservative	Douglas Arthur Scollick	730		
Communist	C. L. Coleman	74		
Turnout		4,245	47.2	
Liberal win (new seat)				

St Paul's Cray (3)
Party	Candidate	Votes	%	±%
Labour	Raymond Alexander Sanderson	2,947		
Labour	D. W. Ryan	2,913		
Labour	Ernest William White	2,826		
Conservative	H. A. Miller	672		
Conservative	Albert E. Stayte	671		
Conservative	G. H. Fennell	656		
Liberal	Miss J. Furlanger	382		
Liberal	George H Watson	377		
Liberal	K. Howland	373		
Communist	F. J. Perham	83		
Turnout		4,060	31.4	
Labour win (new seat)				

Shortlands (2)
Party	Candidate	Votes	%	±%
Conservative	Alfred T. Johnson	2,537		
Conservative	Henry Thomas Parkin	2,454		
Liberal	Mrs. J. E. Monroe	662		
Liberal	Ian Phillips	609		
Labour	Mrs. M. I. F. Harvey	202		
Labour	C. Castles	182		
Turnout		3,343	43.8	
Conservative win (new seat)				

West Wickham North (2)
Party	Candidate	Votes	%	±%
Conservative	E. R. Smithers	2,255		
Conservative	Mrs Daisy E L West	2,231		
Liberal	A. J. Marker	1,222		
Liberal	P. J. Carrington	1,176		
Labour	P. J. Doe	259		
Labour	Mrs. P. Doe	247		
Turnout		3,733	51.0	
Conservative win (new seat)				

West Wickham South (2)
Party	Candidate	Votes	%	±%
Conservative	Kathleen Agnes Moore	2,433		
Conservative	Kenneth V. Crask	2,428		
Liberal	B. H. Edwards	1,362		
Liberal	J. W. C. Hill	1,325		
Labour	S. H. Hassell	516		
Labour	Mrs. I. A. Hassell	494		
Turnout		4,333	56.5	
Conservative win (new seat)				
