= Chislehurst (ward) =

Electoral ward in London, England

- Electoral ward for the Bromley London Borough Council
- Borough: Bromley
- County: Greater London
- Population: 15,569 (2021)
- Major settlements: Chislehurst
- Area: 9.972 km²

Current electoral ward
- Created: 1965
- Councillors: 3

Chislehurst is an electoral ward in the London Borough of Bromley. The ward was first used in the 1964 elections and elects three councillors to Bromley London Borough Council.

== Geography ==
The ward is named after the district of Chislehurst.

== Councillors ==
Election	Councillors		
2018	Katy Boughey (Conservative)	Kieran Terry (Conservative)	Suraj Sharma (Conservative)
2022	Alison Stammers (Chislehurst Matters)	Mark Smith (Chislehurst Matters)	Michael Jack (Chislehurst Matters)

== Elections ==
=== 2022 ===
Chislehurst (3 seats)
Party	Candidate	Votes	%	±%
Chislehurst Matters	Alison Stammers	2,827	58.9	New
Chislehurst Matters	Mark Smith	2,548	53.1	New
Chislehurst Matters	Michael Jack	2,531	52.7	New
Conservative	Katy Boughey*	1,509	31.4	−35.3
Conservative	Edward Fitzgerald	1,453	30.3	−29.7
Conservative	Kieran Terry*	1,386	28.9	−33.6
Labour	Juliet Owens	478	10.0	−6.1
Labour	Ewan Greenwood	454	9.5	−4.7
Labour	Christian Mole	438	9.1	−10.3
Liberal Democrats	Mark Gill	252	5.2	−7.9
Liberal Democrats	Alex Wetton	249	5.2	−5.7
Turnout		4,801	41	
Registered electors		11,576		
Chislehurst Matters gain from Conservative		Swing		
Chislehurst Matters gain from Conservative		Swing		
Chislehurst Matters gain from Conservative		Swing		

=== 2018 ===
Chislehurst
Party	Candidate	Votes	%	±%
Conservative	Katy Boughey	3,094	66.7	+6.3
Conservative	Kieran Terry	2,900	62.5	+3.5
Conservative	Suraj Sharma	2,784	60.0	+14.4
Labour	Christian Mole	901	19.4	+4.8
Labour	Mick Maroney	748	16.1	+1.3
Labour	Eugene Nixon	660	14.2	−0.6
Green	Stella Gardiner	642	13.8	+0.8
Liberal Democrats	Ian Magrath	607	13.1	+6.5
Liberal Democrats	Robert Cliff	507	10.9	+3.3
Liberal Democrats	Simon Lewis	436	9.4	+3.8
Turnout		13,279	39	
Registered electors		12,012		
Conservative hold		Swing		
Conservative hold		Swing		
Conservative hold		Swing		

== See also ==
- List of electoral wards in Greater London
