= 2026 Hammersmith and Fulham London Borough Council election =

2026 UK local government election

2026 Hammersmith & Fulham London Borough Council election
- 7 May 2026

All 50 seats to Hammersmith & Fulham London Borough Council 26 seats needed for a majority
- Turnout: 39.4%

	First party	Second party
Leader	Stephen Cowan	Jose Afonso
Party	Labour	Conservative
Last election	40 seats, 57.1%	10 seats, 29.1%
Seats before	37 (Note: Includes the vacant seat in Hammersmith Broadway last held by Labour.)	10
Seats won	38	12
Seat change	▼2	▲2
	Third party	Fourth party
Leader	Trey Campbell-Simon
Party	Green	Independent
Last election	0 seats, 3.0%	0 seats, 0.2%
Seats before	2	1
Seats won	0	0
Seat change	Steady	Steady
- Map of the results of the 2026 Hammersmith and Fulham council election. Conservatives in blue and Labour in red.
Leader before election
Stephen Cowan
Labour
Leader after election
Stephen Cowan
Labour

The 2026 Hammersmith and Fulham London Borough Council election took place on 7 May 2026, as part of the 2026 United Kingdom local elections. All 50 members of Hammersmith and Fulham London Borough Council were to be elected. The election took place alongside local elections in the other London boroughs.

The election saw the council remain under Labour majority control.

== Background ==
=== History ===
Result of the 2022 election

The thirty-two London boroughs were established in 1965 by the London Government Act 1963. They are the principal authorities in Greater London and have responsibilities including education, housing, planning, highways, social services, libraries, recreation, waste, environmental health and revenue collection. Some of the powers are shared with the Greater London Authority, which also manages passenger transport, police and fire.

Since its formation, Hammersmith and Fulham has been under Labour control, Conservative control or no overall control. The council has had a Labour majority since the 2014 election. In the most recent election in 2022, Labour extended their majority to 40 seats with 57.1% of the vote, while the Conservatives won 10 seats with 29.1% of the vote. The incumbent leader of the council is the Labour councillor Stephen Cowan, who has held that position since 2014.

== Electoral process ==
Hammersmith and Fulham, like other London borough councils, elects all of its councillors at once every four years. The previous election took place in 2018. The election took place by multi-member first-past-the-post voting, with each ward being represented by two or three councillors. Electors had as many votes as there are councillors to be elected in their ward, with the top two or three being elected.

All registered electors (British, Irish, Commonwealth and European Union citizens) living in London aged 18 or over were entitled to vote in the election. People who lived at two addresses in different councils, such as university students with different term-time and holiday addresses, were entitled to be registered for and vote in elections in both local authorities. Voting in-person at polling stations took place from 7:00 to 22:00 on election day, and voters were able to apply for postal votes or proxy votes in advance of the election.

== Previous council composition ==
After 2022 election		Before 2026 election		After 2026 election	
Party	Seats	Party	Seats	Party	Seats
Labour	40	Labour	36	Labour	38
Conservative	10	Conservative	10	Conservative	12
		Green	2		
		Independent	1		
		Vacant	1		

Changes 2022–2026:

- July 2023: David Morton (Labour) suspended from party
- January 2025: Emma Apthorp (Labour) and Ben Coleman (Labour) resign – by-elections held February 2025
- February 2025: Callum Nimmo (Labour) and Lydia Paynter (Labour) win by-elections
- May 2025: Andrew Dinsmore (Conservative) resigns – by-election held July 2025
- July 2025:
  - Liam Downer-Sanderson (Conservative) wins by-election
  - Trey Campbell-Simon (Labour) and Liz Collins (Labour) join Greens
- November 2025: Patricia Quigley (Labour) resigns – seat left vacant until 2026 election

== Results summary ==
2026 Hammersmith and Fulham London Borough Council election
Party	Seats	Gains	Losses	Net gain/loss	Seats %	Votes %	Votes	+/−
Labour	38	0	2	▼2	76.0	40.7	47,421	▼16.4
Conservative	12	2	0	▲2	24.0	26.8	31,225	▼2.3
Green	0	0	0	Steady	0.0	12.7	14,788	▲9.7
Reform	0	0	0	Steady	0.0	11.6	13,468	
Liberal Democrats	0	0	0	Steady	0.0	7.9	9,247	▼2.7
Independent	0	0	0	Steady	0.0	0.2	283	Steady

== Ward results ==
=== Addison ===
Addison (2)
Party	Candidate	Votes	%	±%
Labour	Jacolyn Daly	958	55.2	−20.6
Labour	Ross Melton	808	46.6	−23.5
Green	Olivia MacDonald	360	20.7	N/A
Conservative	Tara Douglas-Home	335	19.3	+3.1
Conservative	Stephen Hamilton	292	16.8	+2.2
Liberal Democrats	Janet Burden	207	11.9	−3.3
Reform	Philip Lane	200	5.8	N/A
Reform	Sharon Kudmani	186	5.4	N/A
Liberal Democrats	Stephen Morris	124	3.6	N/A
Turnout		1,735	34.3%	+3.6
Rejected ballots		11		
Labour hold				
Labour hold				

=== Avonmore ===
Avonmore (2)
Party	Candidate	Votes	%	±%
Labour	Laura Janes	918	47.6	−19.3
Labour	Joe Eaton	794	41.1	−19.1
Conservative	Joe Carlebach	521	27.0	+2.6
Conservative	Andras Chiriliuc	395	20.5	−2.9
Green	Keith Mallinson	381	19.7	N/A
Reform	James Clarke	208	10.8	N/A
Reform	Lorraine Davison	198	10.3	N/A
Independent	David Morton	189	9.8	N/A
Liberal Democrats	Maximilian Hess	131	6.8	−9.3
Liberal Democrats	Andrew Duguid	126	6.5	N/A
Turnout		1,931	39.2%	+5.4
Rejected ballots		4		
Labour hold				
Labour hold				

=== Brook Green ===
Brook Green (2)
Party	Candidate	Votes	%	±%
Labour	Stala Antoniades	1,135	47.6	−10.6
Labour	Florent Sherifi	1,014	42.5	−11.2
Conservative	Horatio Lovering	751	31.5	+1.4
Conservative	Elliott Mears	740	31.0	+1.6
Green	Keith Petts	374	15.7	N/A
Liberal Democrats	Dorothy Brooks	198	8.3	−4.6
Reform	Hannah Rolph	172	7.2	N/A
Reform	Olivia Spencer-Knott	164	6.9	N/A
Liberal Democrats	Humphrey Hawksley	131	5.5	N/A
Independent	Damien Smyth	94	3.9	N/A
Turnout		2,387	45.5%	+7.8
Rejected ballots		13		
Labour hold				
Labour hold				

=== College Park & Old Oak ===
College Park & Old Oak (3)
Party	Candidate	Votes	%	±%
Labour	Wesley Harcourt	1,110	55.1	−22.2
Labour	Alexandra Sanderson	1,090	54.1	−20.4
Labour	Bora Kwon	1,034	51.3	−20.6
Green	Mikael Tariq	645	32.0	N/A
Reform	Leona Jempeji	364	18.1	N/A
Reform	Andrew Nelson	362	18.0	N/A
Reform	Levente Kiss	357	17.7	N/A
Liberal Democrats	Jo Boothby	253	12.6	−1.5
Conservative	Elisabeth Beloten	220	10.9	−4.0
Liberal Democrats	Michael Cook	213	10.6	N/A
Conservative	Will Duckworth	206	10.2	−4.7
Conservative	Chris Lim	190	9.4	−5.5
Turnout		2,015	31%	+3.8
Rejected ballots		10		
Labour hold				
Labour hold				
Labour hold				

=== Coningham ===
Coningham (3)
Party	Candidate	Votes	%	±%
Labour	Lisa Homan	1,399	49.1	−18.1
Labour	Rowan Ree	1,280	57.3	−12.4
Labour	Rory Vaughan	1,229	43.1	−14.7
Green	Aidan Chisholm	860	30.2	+6.9
Green	Fatima Yusuf	825	28.9	+8.7
Green	Wilf MacDonald-Brown	792	27.8	+12.6
Conservative	David Cann	353	12.4	−0.9
Conservative	Mark Loveday	320	11.2	−1.6
Conservative	Georgina Stewart	315	11.1	−1.2
Reform	Rachel Green	302	10.6	N/A
Reform	Chris Clowes	294	10.3	N/A
Reform	Bozidar Zabavnik	233	8.2	N/A
Liberal Democrats	Aparna Garimella	182	6.4	−1.3
Liberal Democrats	Fernanda Miucci	168	5.9	−0.8
Turnout		2,851	38.5%	+8.4
Rejected ballots		15		
Labour hold				
Labour hold				
Labour hold				

=== Fulham Reach ===
Fulham Reach (3)
Party	Candidate	Votes	%	±%
Labour	David Campbell	1,550	49.7	−19.3
Labour	Anna Magryta-Urban	1,487	47.7	−13.4
Labour	Nikos Souslous	1,393	44.6	−15.2
Conservative	Caroline Ffiske	781	25.0	−1.3
Conservative	Mark Nelson	713	22.8	−2.5
Conservative	Fuad Hendricks	653	20.9	−1.8
Green	Tereza Cervenova	586	18.8	N/A
Green	Ash Goddard	538	17.2	N/A
Reform	James Bennett	439	14.1	N/A
Reform	Shelly Sawyer	395	12.7	N/A
Reform	Joe Soares	382	12.2	N/A
Liberal Democrats	Jelena Sarmo	224	7.2	−6.6
Liberal Democrats	Meher Oliaji	221	7.1	−3.1
Turnout		3,121	41%	+5.4
Rejected ballots		8		
Labour hold				
Labour hold				
Labour hold				

=== Fulham Town ===
Fulham Town (2)
Party	Candidate	Votes	%	±%
Conservative	Victoria Brocklebank-Fowler	990	49.3	+2.6
Conservative	Liam Downer-Sanderson	906	45.1	+1.7
Labour	Mary Smith	398	19.8	−8.6
Liberal Democrats	Jacqueline Dennee	359	17.9	−10.8
Liberal Democrats	Roy Pounsford	344	17.1	−6.4
Labour	Jonathan Wong	309	15.4	−10.3
Green	Shruti Mohan	262	13.0	N/A
Reform	Matthew Riding	245	12.2	N/A
Reform	Joseph Robertson	204	10.2	N/A
Turnout		2,009	39.6%	+5.6
Rejected ballots		2		
Conservative hold				
Conservative hold				

=== Grove ===
Grove (2)
Party	Candidate	Votes	%	±%
Labour	Hannah Bulmer	1,166	53.9	−16.9
Labour	Stephen Cowan	1,159	53.6	−15.2
Green	Robert Donnelly	422	19.5	N/A
Conservative	Andrew Ground	411	19.0	+0.9
Conservative	Elizabeth St Clair-Legge	391	18.1	+1.0
Liberal Democrats	David Burridge	214	9.9	−7.8
Reform	Tom Hannah	200	9.2	N/A
Reform	Joanna Moore	187	8.6	N/A
Liberal Democrats	Pema Grohs	178	8.2	N/A
Turnout		2,164	43.1%	+4.6
Rejected ballots		2		
Labour hold				
Labour hold				

=== Hammersmith Broadway ===
Hammersmith Broadway (2)
Party	Candidate	Votes	%	±%
Labour	Molly Mantle	878	44.5	−29.6
Labour	Callum Nimmo	826	41.8	−26.8
Green	Nikita Crocker	507	25.7	N/A
Green	David Gabra	404	20.5	N/A
Reform	Olivia Feng	293	14.8	N/A
Conservative	Maximillian Campbell	248	12.6	−6.8
Reform	Muj Khan	235	11.9	N/A
Liberal Democrats	Meerav Shah	208	10.5	+0.5
Conservative	Nora Farah	199	10.1	−5.9
Liberal Democrats	Conrad Wood	150	7.6	−0.7
Turnout		1,974	39.7%	+8.3
Rejected ballots		13		
Labour hold				
Labour hold				

=== Lillie ===
Lillie (2)
Party	Candidate	Votes	%	±%
Labour	Sharon Holder	701	42.3	−20.9
Labour	Lydia Paynter	665	40.1	−19.2
Conservative	Saadi Chowdhury	549	33.1	+7.3
Conservative	Tom Wade	536	32.3	+9.3
Green	Maria Guerrero	327	19.7	N/A
Reform	Daniel Pienaar	194	11.7	N/A
Reform	Subodh Gupta	176	10.6	N/A
Liberal Democrats	Francis Flaherty	167	10.1	−1.4
Turnout		1,658	37.3%	+7.1
Rejected ballots		6		
Labour hold				
Labour hold				

=== Munster ===
Munster (3)
Party	Candidate	Votes	%	±%
Conservative	Adronie Alford	1,378	45.4	+3.9
Conservative	Dominic Stanton	1,305	43.0	+1.6
Conservative	Stewart Waine	1,241	40.9	+1.3
Labour	Caroline Needham	843	27.8	−4.1
Labour	Guy Vincent	713	23.5	−7.2
Labour	Patrick Walsh	665	21.9	−7.6
Green	Jason Khan	550	18.1	N/A
Reform	Lucy O'Sullivan	451	14.9	N/A
Reform	Mervyn Guille	442	14.6	N/A
Liberal Democrats	Lawrence Gould	406	13.4	−12.7
Liberal Democrats	Ted Townsend	394	13.0	−12.1
Reform	David Kelly	382	12.6	N/A
Liberal Democrats	Philipp Rader	330	10.9	−12.4
Turnout		3,033	38.4%	+4.6
Rejected ballots		10		
Conservative hold				
Conservative hold				
Conservative hold				

=== Palace & Hurlingham ===
Palace & Hurlingham (3)
Party	Candidate	Votes	%	±%
Conservative	Amanda Lloyd-Harris	2,037	57.8	+1.5
Conservative	Jeremy Maddocks	1,972	55.9	+1.6
Conservative	Aliya Afzal-Khan	1,952	55.4	+2.0
Labour	Shirley Cupit	830	23.5	−6.7
Labour	Orlando Morley	729	20.7	−5.1
Labour	Nick Elverston	708	20.1	−3.0
Green	Matt Dobson	593	16.8	−0.3
Liberal Democrats	Tamara Dragadze	556	15.8	−2.4
Reform	Guy Hennings	435	12.3	N/A
Reform	Stephen Lewis	399	11.3	N/A
Reform	William Tucker	363	10.3	N/A
Turnout		3,525	45.9%	+7.2
Rejected ballots		8		
Conservative hold				
Conservative hold				
Conservative hold				

=== Parsons Green & Sandford ===
Parsons Green & Sandford (2)
Party	Candidate	Votes	%	±%
Conservative	Jose Afonso	1,158	52.6	−1.7
Conservative	Adrian Pascu-Tulbure	1,055	47.9	−5.7
Labour	Alexandra Thomas	404	18.3	−12.0
Labour	Isabella Wyatt	385	17.5	−9.7
Reform	Peter Moore	319	14.5	N/A
Reform	Rajeev Nair	244	11.1	N/A
Green	Sam Jones	239	10.8	N/A
Liberal Democrats	Jerome Lussan	218	9.9	−5.6
Liberal Democrats	Graham Muir	194	8.8	−6.5
Green	Sana Omar	191	8.7	N/A
Turnout		2,204	41.3%	+9.3
Rejected ballots		4		
Conservative hold				
Conservative hold				

=== Ravenscourt ===
Ravenscourt (2)
Party	Candidate	Votes	%	±%
Labour	Natalie Lindsay	1,180	54.1	−6.0
Labour	Harry Brackley	1,109	50.8	−1.0
Conservative	Alexander Baker	476	21.8	−2.7
Green	Matt Reynolds	447	20.5	+7.3
Conservative	Patrick Read	444	20.3	−3.4
Liberal Democrats	Henrietta Bewley	245	11.2	−1.9
Reform	Jacquie Bach	170	7.8	N/A
Reform	Cath Baker	152	7.0	N/A
Liberal Democrats	Louis Kemp	142	6.5	−3.0
Turnout		2,183	46.6%	+3.7
Rejected ballots		9		
Labour hold				
Labour hold				

=== Sands End ===
Sands End (3)
Party	Candidate	Votes	%	±%
Conservative	Rob Harris	967	37.5	−3.4
Labour	Roseanne Meacher	946	36.6	−13.9
Conservative	Libby Hart	941	36.4	−2.0
Conservative	Matt Sinclair	927	35.9	−0.7
Labour	David Morris	857	33.2	−16.4
Labour	Ken Jemedafe	841	32.6	−13.7
Green	Martyna Marcinkowska	472	18.3	N/A
Reform	Amanda Beddows-Adams	410	15.9	N/A
Reform	Deep Bassi	357	13.8	N/A
Reform	Tom Stojanovic	327	12.7	N/A
Liberal Democrats	Ray Burnet	260	10.1	−2.4
Liberal Democrats	Henry Bagwell	224	8.7	+0.1
Liberal Democrats	Benjamin Budd	217	8.4	N/A
Turnout		2,582	35%	+2.6
Rejected ballots		5		
Conservative gain from Labour				
Labour hold				
Conservative gain from Labour				

=== Shepherd's Bush Green ===
Shepherd's Bush Green (2)
Party	Candidate	Votes	%	±%
Labour	Zarar Qayyum	626	44.8	−28.0
Labour	Mercy Umeh	584	41.8	−30.7
Green	Rafela Fitzhugh	409	29.3	N/A
Green	Kwasi Owusu	344	24.6	N/A
Liberal Democrats	Elsie Gisslegard	214	15.3	−0.5
Liberal Democrats	Fergus Ustianowski	178	12.8	N/A
Reform	Shay McCarthy	119	8.5	N/A
Reform	Lauren Smith	116	8.3	N/A
Conservative	Ali Douas	104	7.4	−7.9
Conservative	Chris Vinante	98	7.0	−7.0
Turnout		1,396	38.8%	+10.5
Rejected ballots		12		
Labour hold				
Labour hold				

=== Walham Green ===
Walham Green (2)
Party	Candidate	Votes	%	±%
Labour	Sam Kelly	731	38.7	−16.4
Labour	Genevieve Nwaogbe	730	38.7	−13.5
Conservative	Elinor Bale	642	34.0	+6.2
Conservative	James Windsor-Clive	631	33.4	+7.3
Green	Ann Savage	314	16.6	+6.2
Reform	Edward Colnet	261	13.8	N/A
Reform	Dan Taub	216	11.4	N/A
Liberal Democrats	Luigi Trovato	131	6.9	−4.3
Liberal Democrats	Oliver Wessely	118	6.3	−3.2
Turnout		1,887	39.7%	+7.8
Rejected ballots		2		
Labour hold				
Labour hold				

=== Wendell Park ===
Wendell Park (2)
Party	Candidate	Votes	%	±%
Labour	Rebecca Harvey	1,372	59.3	−11.0
Labour	Asif Siddique	1,102	47.6	−13.1
Green	Frances McFadden	551	23.8	N/A
Conservative	William Hollinrake-Dobson	410	17.7	−3.8
Conservative	Alex Karmel	399	17.2	−2.8
Liberal Democrats	Jon Burden	236	10.2	−8.2
Reform	Christine Low	197	8.5	N/A
Reform	Richard Owen	194	8.4	N/A
Liberal Democrats	Leon Mihelcic	170	7.3	N/A
Turnout		2,316	45.4%	+4.5
Rejected ballots		8		
Labour hold				
Labour hold				

=== West Kensington ===
West Kensington (3)
Party	Candidate	Votes	%	±%
Labour	Victoria Brignell	1,023	49.8	−15.3
Labour	Daryl Brown	962	46.8	−17.8
Labour	Florian Chevoppe-Verdier	885	43.1	−18.6
Green	Denise Baker	602	29.3	N/A
Conservative	Jackie Borland	400	19.5	−2.8
Conservative	Harry Phibbs	378	18.4	−0.9
Conservative	Yaz Monerawela	328	16.0	−2.5
Reform	David Amos	308	15.0	N/A
Reform	Martin Howe	286	13.9	N/A
Reform	Hilary MacDonald	276	13.4	N/A
Liberal Democrats	Sarah Taylor	264	12.9	−1.8
Liberal Democrats	Gill Barnes	259	12.6	−0.7
Liberal Democrats	Jose Espinas	191	9.3	−0.7
Turnout		2,054	33.8%	+3.6
Rejected ballots		10		
Labour hold				
Labour hold				
Labour hold				

=== White City ===
White City (3)
Party	Candidate	Votes	%	±%
Labour	Andrew Jones	1,397	55.1	−18.9
Labour	Natalia Perez	1,335	52.7	−20.9
Labour	Frances Umeh	1,275	50.3	−16.6
Green	Emma Byrne	809	31.9	+13.6
Green	Archie Thomas	741	29.2	N/A
Green	Zayna Mansuri	734	29.0	N/A
Reform	Jonathan Allmark	214	8.4	N/A
Reform	Dean Sawyer	195	7.7	N/A
Conservative	James Watts	184	7.3	−5.4
Conservative	Jamie Monteith-Mann	181	7.1	−3.3
Reform	Rodney Smith	173	6.8	N/A
Conservative	Fahim Imam-Sadeque	172	6.8	−3.6
Liberal Democrats	Rory Mullan	101	4.0	−7.9
Liberal Democrats	Sasha Mataya	94	3.7	N/A
Turnout		2,535	38%	+10.5
Rejected ballots		7		
Labour hold				
Labour hold				
Labour hold				

=== Wormholt ===
Wormholt (2)
Party	Candidate	Votes	%	±%
Labour	Nicole Trehy	965	53.5	−13.5
Labour	Max Schmid	923	51.2	−14.5
Green	Tallulah Coen-D'Arcy	509	28.2	+11.8
Reform	Maggie Casey	264	14.6	N/A
Conservative	Will Marshall	238	13.2	−3.4
Reform	Tuhin Reynolds-Imam	208	11.5	N/A
Conservative	Zehra Imam-Sadeque	192	10.6	−5.3
Liberal Democrats	Patrick O’Connell	160	8.9	−1.5
Liberal Democrats	Simon Nixon	147	8.2	N/A
Turnout		1,803	38.1%	+8.2
Rejected ballots		7		
Labour hold				
Labour hold				
