= Hammersmith and Chiswick =

UK Parliament constituency (since 2024)

- Borough constituency for the House of Commons
- Interactive map of boundaries from 2024
- Location within Greater London
- County: Greater London
- Electorate: 74,746 (March 2020)

Current constituency
- Created: 2024
- Member of Parliament: Andy Slaughter (Labour)
- Seats: One
- Created from: Hammersmith & Brentford and Isleworth

Hammersmith and Chiswick is a constituency (Note: A borough constituency (for the purposes of election expenses and type of returning officer)) of the House of Commons in the UK Parliament. It was established by the 2023 review of Westminster constituencies and was first contested at the 2024 general election. It is represented by Andy Slaughter of the Labour Party, who previously held the abolished seat of Hammersmith from 2010.

== Constituency profile ==
Hammersmith and Chiswick is an urban constituency located in Greater London, west of the centre of the city. It covers the neighbourhoods of Hammersmith, Chiswick and Shepherd's Bush. Like much of outer London, the area grew rapidly with suburban development during the late 19th century. Chiswick is generally affluent with low levels of deprivation and Hammersmith has average levels of wealth. The Shepherd's Bush area is mostly deprived and includes part of the White City Estate, a low-income housing development. Shepherd's Bush also contains Westfield London, the largest shopping centre in the country. The average house price across the constituency is over £1 million, more than three times the national average.

In general, residents of the constituency are young, well-educated and unlikely to be homeowners. They have very high levels of income and professional employment. White people made up 63% of the population at the 2021 census, a higher proportion than the rest of London. The constituency has large Italian and Polish communities with White people of non-British origin making up 21% of residents. Black people and Asians were 11% each. At the local borough council level, Hammersmith and Shepherd's Bush are represented by the Labour Party whilst Chiswick elected Conservatives. Voters in the constituency overwhelmingly supported remaining in the European Union in the 2016 referendum; an estimated 72% voted to remain, making Hammersmith and Chiswick one of the top 30 most remain-voting constituencies out of 650 nationwide, with the pro-European party Rejoin EU receiving their largest share of the vote here in the 25 seats they contested in the 2024 General Election, at 1.8%.

== Boundaries ==
The constituency is in West London and comprises the following electoral wards:

- The London Borough of Hammersmith and Fulham wards of Addison, Avonmore, Brook Green, Coningham, Grove, Hammersmith Broadway, Ravenscourt, Shepherd's Bush Green, Wendell Park and White City from the abolished constituency of Hammersmith
- The London Borough of Hounslow wards of Chiswick Gunnersbury, Chiswick Homefields and Chiswick Riverside, previously part of Brentford and Isleworth

== Election results ==
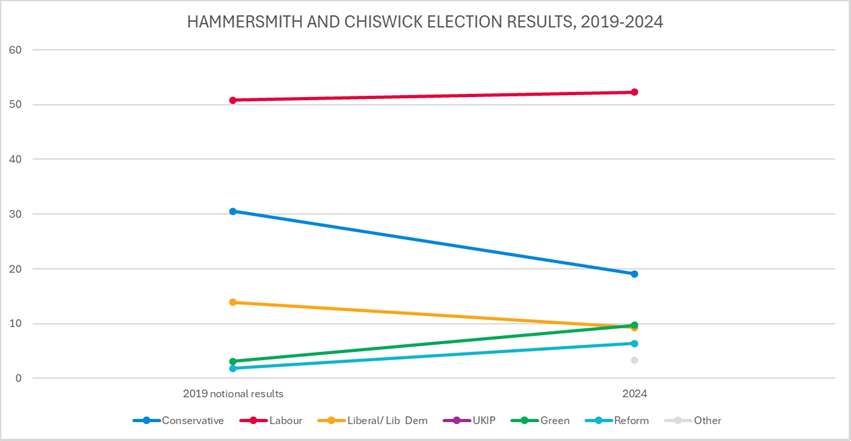
Election results 2019–2024

=== Elections in the 2020s ===
General election 2024: Hammersmith and Chiswick
| Party | Candidate | Votes | % | ±% |
|---|---|---|---|---|
| Labour | Andy Slaughter | 24,073 | 52.3 | +1.5 |
| Conservative | Andrew Dinsmore | 8,783 | 19.1 | −11.4 |
| Green | Naranee Ruthra-Rajan | 4,468 | 9.7 | +6.6 |
| Liberal Democrats | Eraj Rostaqi | 4,292 | 9.3 | −4.6 |
| Reform | Louise Petano-Heathcote | 2,929 | 6.4 | +4.6 |
| Rejoin EU | Bill Colegrave | 821 | 1.8 | N/A |
| Workers Party | Raj Gill | 439 | 1.0 | N/A |
| Workers Revolutionary | Scott Dore | 216 | 0.5 | N/A |
| Majority | | 15,290 | 33.2 | +12.9 |
| Turnout | | 46,021 | 60.7 | −10.6 |
| Registered electors | | 75,860 | | |
| Labour win (new seat) | | | | |

=== Elections in the 2010s ===
2019 notional result
| Party | Vote | % |
|---|---|---|
| Labour | 27,051 | 50.8 |
| Conservative | 16,228 | 30.5 |
| Liberal Democrats | 7,390 | 13.9 |
| Green | 1,632 | 3.1 |
| Brexit Party | 976 | 1.8 |
| Turnout | 53,277 | 71.3 |
| Electorate | 74,746 | |

== See also ==
- Parliamentary constituencies in London
