= 1990 Hammersmith and Fulham London Borough Council election =

1990 local election in England

1990 Hammersmith and Fulham Borough Council election
- 3 May 1990

All 50 seats to Hammersmith and Fulham London Borough Council 26 seats needed for a majority
- Registered: 98,916
- Turnout: 52,583, 53.16%

| | First party | Second party | Third party |
|---|---|---|---|
| Party | Labour | Conservative | Liberal Democrats |
| Last election | 40 seats, 50.4% | 9 seats, 33.8% | 1 seat, 13.7% |
| Seats before | 41 | 9 | 0 |
| Seats won | 28 | 22 | 0 (Note: Results include those from three candidates who ran in the College Park and Old Oak ward under the Liberal Democratic Focus Team name) |
| Seat change | ▼13 | ▲13 | Steady |
| Popular vote | 55,264 | 45,198 | 5,985 |
| Percentage | 50.60% | 41.39% | 5.48% |
- Map of the results of the 1990 Hammersmith and Fulham council election. Conservatives in blue and Labour in red.
Council control before election
Labour
Council control after election
Labour

The 1990 Hammersmith and Fulham Council election took place on 3 May 1990 to elect members of Hammersmith and Fulham London Borough Council in London, England. The whole council was up for election and the Labour party stayed in overall control of the council.

== Background ==
In five out of the six by-elections since the previous Council was elected, the previous party had retained the seat. In May 1989 Labour won the seat previously held by Simon Knott for the Liberal Democrats, following his resignation from the Council. He had held a seat on the Council since 1974, having also contested the previous three elections since the Council was originally formed in 1968.

== Election result ==
The Labour Party won 28 seats - a loss of 12 seats from the 1986 election, but maintained control. The Conservative Party won 22 seats - a gain of 13 seats from their previous result. The Liberal Democrats lost their only seat on the council.

1990 Hammersmith and Fulham Local Elections
| Party | Seats | Gains | Losses | Net gain/loss | Seats % | Votes % | Votes | +/− |
|---|---|---|---|---|---|---|---|---|
| Labour | 28 | 0 | 13 | ▼13 | 56.00 | 50.60 | 55,264 | |
| Conservative | 22 | 13 | 0 | ▲13 | 44.00 | 41.39 | 45,198 | |
| Liberal Democrats | 0 | 0 | 0 | Steady | 0.00 | 5.48 | 5,985 | |
| Green | 0 | 0 | 0 | Steady | 0.00 | 1.51 | 1,646 | |
| SDP | 0 | 0 | 0 | Steady | 0.00 | 1.00 | 1,092 | |
| Communist | 0 | 0 | 0 | Steady | 0.00 | 0.02 | 22 | |
| Total | 50 | | | | | | 109,207 | |

== Ward results ==
(*) - indicates an incumbent candidate

(†) - indicates an incumbent candidate that is standing in a different ward

=== Addison ===
Addison (2)
| Party | Candidate | Votes | % |
|---|---|---|---|
| Labour | Jeffrey Kenner* | 1,299 | 55.72 |
| Labour | Bridget T. Prentice* | 1,177 | |
| Conservative | Eleanor F. Belsham | 796 | 34.65 |
| Conservative | David C. McCraith | 744 | |
| Green | Alison McMichael | 228 | 9.63 |
| Green | Roger S. Crosskey | 200 | |
| Registered electors | | 4,252 | |
| Turnout | | 2311 | 54.24 |
| Rejected ballots | | 5 | 0.22 |
| Labour hold | | | |
| Labour hold | | | |

=== Avonmore ===
Avonmore (2)
| Party | Candidate | Votes | % |
|---|---|---|---|
| Conservative | Sonya Hilton | 936 | 51.75 |
| Conservative | Julian L. Muller | 924 | |
| Labour | Gerard James | 694 | 37.90 |
| Labour | Nighat Aftab | 668 | |
| SDP | George A. Colerick | 193 | 10.35 |
| SDP | Rev. David M. Mason | 178 | |
| Registered electors | | 4,016 | |
| Turnout | | 1857 | 46.24 |
| Rejected ballots | | 6 | 0.32 |
| Conservative gain from Labour | | | |
| Conservative gain from Labour | | | |

=== Broadway ===
Broadway (2)
| Party | Candidate | Votes | % |
|---|---|---|---|
| Labour | Jacqueline Abbott* | 1,079 | 54.30 |
| Labour | Kenneth J. Burlton | 981 | |
| Conservative | Jeremy P. Mayhew | 541 | 27.62 |
| Conservative | Toby N. Vintcent | 507 | |
| Liberal Democrats | Lois A. Hants | 247 | 12.76 |
| Liberal Democrats | Neil R. Sherlock | 236 | |
| SDP | Eileen R. Cox | 101 | 5.32 |
| SDP | Thomas E.G. Hayhoe | 100 | |
| Registered electors | | 3,607 | |
| Turnout | | 1981 | 54.92 |
| Rejected ballots | | 5 | 0.25 |
| Labour hold | | | |
| Labour hold | | | |

=== Brook Green ===
Brook Green (2)
| Party | Candidate | Votes | % |
|---|---|---|---|
| Conservative | John A. Hennessy* | 1,240 | 54.52 |
| Conservative | Peter C. Prince* | 1,182 | |
| Labour | Jane Hackworth-Young | 845 | 37.24 |
| Labour | Sophi Tranchell | 809 | |
| Liberal Democrats | Robert I. Crawford | 194 | 8.24 |
| Liberal Democrats | Simon P. Bryceson | 171 | |
| Registered electors | | 4,210 | |
| Turnout | | 2303 | 54.70 |
| Rejected ballots | | 4 | 0.17 |
| Conservative hold | | | |
| Conservative hold | | | |

=== Colehill ===
Colehill (2)
| Party | Candidate | Votes | % |
|---|---|---|---|
| Conservative | Adronie E. Alford | 1,276 | 52.97 |
| Conservative | Antony Lillis | 1,240 | |
| Labour | Wesley S. Harcourt | 921 | 38.53 |
| Labour | Alan R. Soffert | 908 | |
| Green | Ralph C.G. Clarke | 202 | 8.50 |
| Registered electors | | 4,141 | |
| Turnout | | 2356 | 56.89 |
| Rejected ballots | | 2 | 0.08 |
| Conservative gain from Labour | | | |
| Conservative gain from Labour | | | |

=== College Park and Old Oak ===
College Park and Old Oak (3)
| Party | Candidate | Votes | % |
|---|---|---|---|
| Labour | Frederick C. Inniss* | 1,327 | 57.46 |
| Labour | Hilda M. McCafferty | 1,254 | |
| Labour | Guy Rubin | 1,163 | |
| Lib Dem Focus Team | Martin W.M. Bryant | 651 | 27.12 |
| Lib Dem Focus Team | Sean Cullen | 563 | |
| Lib Dem Focus Team | Sylvia K. Beamish | 554 | |
| Conservative | Robert I. Mackay | 345 | 15.42 |
| Conservative | Graham B. Davies | 342 | |
| Conservative | Neale Stevenson | 318 | |
| Registered electors | | 5,321 | |
| Turnout | | 2411 | 45.31 |
| Rejected ballots | | 4 | 0.17 |
| Labour hold | | | |
| Labour hold | | | |
| Labour hold | | | |

=== Coningham ===
Coningham (3)
| Party | Candidate | Votes | % |
|---|---|---|---|
| Labour | Christine Graham | 1,607 | 59.80 |
| Labour | Samantha J. Elvin | 1,547 | |
| Labour | Josephine A. Wicks | 1,532 | |
| Conservative | Elizabeth A. Sibley | 650 | 23.12 |
| Conservative | Adrian D. Fannon | 592 | |
| Conservative | Nigel C. Waterson | 571 | |
| Green | Matthew L. Galpin | 446 | 17.08 |
| Registered electors | | 6,020 | |
| Turnout | | 2637 | 43.80 |
| Rejected ballots | | 3 | 0.11 |
| Labour hold | | | |
| Labour hold | | | |
| Labour hold | | | |

=== Crabtree ===
Crabtree (2)
| Party | Candidate | Votes | % |
|---|---|---|---|
| Conservative | Guy Mortimer | 1,137 | 49.22 |
| Conservative | Elizabeth Randall | 1,130 | |
| Labour | Hendrick J. Gorter | 1,008 | 43.53 |
| Labour | Gordon Prentice^{†} (Note: Prentice was a sitting councillor for the College Park and Old Oak ward) | 998 | |
| Liberal Democrats | Mairi C. Macintyre | 169 | 7.25 |
| Liberal Democrats | Susan E. Starks | 165 | |
| Registered electors | | 3,839 | |
| Turnout | | 2375 | 61.87 |
| Rejected ballots | | 8 | 0.34 |
| Conservative gain from Labour | | | |
| Conservative gain from Labour | | | |

=== Eel Brook ===
Eel Brook (2)
| Party | Candidate | Votes | % |
|---|---|---|---|
| Conservative | Andrew R.G. Robathan | 1,011 | 51.78 |
| Conservative | David A.R. Thorp | 998 | |
| Labour | Valerie A.E. Barker^{†} (Note: Barker was a sitting councillor for Walham ward) | 955 | 48.22 |
| Labour | Arthur S. Lott | 917 | |
| Registered electors | | 3,588 | |
| Turnout | | 2008 | 55.96 |
| Rejected ballots | | 5 | 0.25 |
| Conservative gain from Labour | | | |
| Conservative gain from Labour | | | |

=== Gibbs Green ===
Gibbs Green (2)
| Party | Candidate | Votes | % |
|---|---|---|---|
| Labour | Iain Coleman | 1,170 | 53.74 |
| Labour | Andrew F. Slaughter* | 1,144 | |
| Conservative | Alexander P. Karmel | 847 | 39.34 |
| Conservative | Susan M. Maxwell Scott | 847 | |
| Liberal Democrats | Gerald C. Killingsworth | 155 | 6.92 |
| Liberal Democrats | Ann Klotz | 142 | |
| Registered electors | | 4,043 | |
| Turnout | | 2231 | 55.18 |
| Rejected ballots | | 11 | 0.49 |
| Labour hold | | | |
| Labour hold | | | |

=== Grove ===
Grove (2)
| Party | Candidate | Votes | % |
|---|---|---|---|
| Labour | Vivienne J. Lukey* | 995 | 49.23 |
| Labour | Leslie E. Aldridge | 975 | |
| Conservative | Lesley-Anne Brennan | 847 | 39.58 |
| Conservative | Suraj P. Sehgal | 737 | |
| Liberal Democrats | Julie Grantham | 252 | 11.19 |
| Liberal Democrats | Ronald Miller | 195 | |
| Registered electors | | 3,872 | |
| Turnout | | 2106 | 54.39 |
| Rejected ballots | | 10 | 0.47 |
| Labour hold | | | |
| Labour hold | | | |

=== Margravine ===
Margravine (2)
| Party | Candidate | Votes | % |
|---|---|---|---|
| Labour | Anthony M. Hastings | 1,248 | 60.45 |
| Labour | Marilyn M. Naden^{†} (Note: Naden was a sitting councillor for Crabtree ward) | 1,170 | |
| Conservative | Pamela V.P. Hurst | 621 | 30.75 |
| Conservative | John E.J. Pickthorn | 608 | |
| Liberal Democrats | Patrick Curry | 157 | 7.70 |
| Liberal Democrats | Michael R. Boudry | 151 | |
| Communist | Alan F. Fox | 22 | 1.10 |
| Registered electors | | 3,947 | |
| Turnout | | 2097 | 53.13 |
| Rejected ballots | | 12 | 0.57 |
| Labour hold | | | |
| Labour hold | | | |

=== Normand ===
Normand (2)
| Party | Candidate | Votes | % |
|---|---|---|---|
| Labour | Eleanor J. Caruana* | 1,222 | 52.83 |
| Labour | Daniel A. Filson^{†} (Note: Filson was a sitting councillor for Walham) | 1,151 | |
| Conservative | Robert Hamilton | 886 | 39.12 |
| Conservative | Owen Power | 871 | |
| Liberal Democrats | David Hollander | 105 | 4.32 |
| Liberal Democrats | Ilona O.H. Lepper | 89 | |
| SDP | Gertrude M. Thompson | 84 | 3.74 |
| Registered electors | | 4,339 | |
| Turnout | | 2289 | 52.75 |
| Rejected ballots | | 3 | 0.13 |
| Labour hold | | | |
| Labour hold | | | |

=== Palace ===
Palace (2)
| Party | Candidate | Votes | % |
|---|---|---|---|
| Conservative | Rosemary Belhaven | 1,665 | 69.91 |
| Conservative | Emile P. Al-Uzaizi* | 1,652 | |
| Labour | Ahmed T. Aftab | 456 | 19.13 |
| Labour | Francis J. Lukey | 452 | |
| Green | Clements, Amanda M.E. Clements | 156 | 6.57 |
| SDP | Duff, Hugh D. Duff | 106 | 4.38 |
| SDP | Elsie Lloyd-Jones | 102 | |
| Registered electors | | 3,742 | |
| Turnout | | 2362 | 63.12 |
| Rejected ballots | | 3 | 0.13 |
| Conservative hold | | | |
| Conservative hold | | | |

=== Ravenscourt ===
Ravenscourt (2)
| Party | Candidate | Votes | % |
|---|---|---|---|
| Conservative | Angela Clarke* | 989 | 46.68 |
| Conservative | William C. Smith | 951 | |
| Labour | Sian Matthews | 789 | 37.30 |
| Labour | Patricia M. Midgal* | 760 | |
| Green | Lavender J. Clarke | 237 | 9.96 |
| Green | David Pearson | 177 | |
| Liberal Democrats | Jean R. Wiffen | 83 | 3.75 |
| Liberal Democrats | Ronald C.G. Wiffen | 72 | |
| SDP | Ian McCourt | 52 | 2.31 |
| SDP | William D.E. Mallinson | 44 | |
| Registered electors | | 3,903 | |
| Turnout | | 2128 | 54.52 |
| Rejected ballots | | 2 | 0.09 |
| Conservative hold | | | |
| Conservative gain from Labour | | | |

=== Sands End ===
Sands End (2)
| Party | Candidate | Votes | % |
|---|---|---|---|
| Labour | Michael N. Goodman* | 1,197 | 51.86 |
| Labour | Nadeem Aftab | 1,119 | |
| Conservative | Peter S.D. Thompson | 852 | 37.44 |
| Conservative | Vanessa Thompson | 823 | |
| Liberal Democrats | Leonard T. Bonser | 157 | 6.94 |
| Liberal Democrats | Mary J. McNamee | 152 | |
| Nursery Workers' Candidate | Noreen M. Morris | 82 | 3.67 |
| Registered electors | | 4,327 | |
| Turnout | | 2304 | 53.25 |
| Rejected ballots | | 9 | 0.39 |
| Labour hold | | | |
| Labour hold | | | |

=== Sherbrooke ===
Sherbrooke (2)
| Party | Candidate | Votes | % |
|---|---|---|---|
| Conservative | Celia M. Johnson | 928 | 48.23 |
| Conservative | Alan P. Thomas | 873 | |
| Labour | Nicholas P. Moore* | 836 | 44.70 |
| Labour | Thomas J. McCrory | 834 | |
| SDP | Alison Christopher | 132 | 7.07 |
| Registered electors | | 3,270 | |
| Turnout | | 1895 | 57.95 |
| Rejected ballots | | 6 | 0.32 |
| Conservative gain from Labour | | | |
| Conservative gain from Labour | | | |

=== Starch Green ===
Starch Green (2)
| Party | Candidate | Votes | % |
|---|---|---|---|
| Labour | David Williams | 1,101 | 52.06 |
| Labour | Stanley, Timothy C. | 1,098 | |
| Conservative | Sally A.E. Roberts | 822 | 38.81 |
| Conservative | John P. Godfrey | 818 | |
| Liberal Democrats | Boswell, Jonathan S. Boswell | 195 | 9.13 |
| Liberal Democrats | Alison J. Sutton-Mattocks | 190 | |
| Registered electors | | 3,940 | |
| Turnout | | 2203 | 55.91 |
| Rejected ballots | | 5 | 0.23 |
| Labour hold | | | |
| Labour hold | | | |

=== Sulivan ===
Sulivan (2)
| Party | Candidate | Votes | % |
|---|---|---|---|
| Conservative | Gerald A. Wombwell* | 1,355 | 58.63 |
| Conservative | Jonathan J. Maiden | 1,342 | |
| Labour | Brendan J. Bird | 820 | 34.98 |
| Labour | Stephen Gardner | 790 | |
| Liberal Democrats | Joan Bonser | 161 | 6.39 |
| Liberal Democrats | Julie Perrin | 133 | |
| Registered electors | | 3,932 | |
| Turnout | | 2364 | 60.12 |
| Rejected ballots | | 2 | 0.08 |
| Conservative hold | | | |
| Conservative hold | | | |

=== Town ===
Town (2)
| Party | Candidate | Votes | % |
|---|---|---|---|
| Conservative | Terence T. McGrath | 1,373 | 61.16 |
| Conservative | Guy F.C. Roberts^{†} (Note: Roberts was a sitting councillor for Sulivan ward) | 1,351 | |
| Labour | Paul Bower | 712 | 31.88 |
| Labour | Dylis R. House | 707 | |
| Liberal Democrats | Suzanna Harris | 159 | 6.96 |
| Liberal Democrats | Alastair J. Brett | 151 | |
| Registered electors | | 4,007 | |
| Turnout | | 2288 | 57.10 |
| Rejected ballots | | 8 | 0.35 |
| Conservative hold | | | |
| Conservative hold | | | |

=== Walham ===
Walham (2)
| Party | Candidate | Votes | % |
|---|---|---|---|
| Conservative | Diana P. Chiesman | 1,235 | 50.53 |
| Conservative | Frances M. Stainton | 1,168 | |
| Labour | Brian M. McMahon | 1,010 | 42.41 |
| Labour | James C. Crane | 1,008 | |
| Liberal Democrats | Richard Graham | 172 | 7.06 |
| Liberal Democrats | Douglas-Mann, Bruce Douglas-Mann | 164 | |
| Registered electors | | 4,837 | |
| Turnout | | 2482 | 51.31 |
| Rejected ballots | | 9 | 0.40 |
| Conservative gain from Labour | | | |
| Conservative gain from Labour | | | |

=== White City and Shepherds Bush ===
White City and Shepherds Bush (3)
| Party | Candidate | Votes | % |
|---|---|---|---|
| Labour | Ronald E. Browne* | 2,088 | 80.79 |
| Labour | Ivan A. Gibbons* | 2,080 | |
| Labour | Jafar M. Khaled | 1,787 | |
| Conservative | Damian H. Green | 554 | 19.21 |
| Conservative | Zohra Jabben | 442 | |
| Conservative | Bozidar Zabavnik | 419 | |
| Registered electors | | 6,008 | |
| Turnout | | 2815 | 46.85 |
| Rejected ballots | | 10 | 0.36 |
| Labour hold | | | |
| Labour hold | | | |
| Labour hold | | | |

=== Wormholt ===
Wormholt (3)
| Party | Candidate | Votes | % |
|---|---|---|---|
| Labour | Colin Aherne* | 1,716 | 63.09 |
| Labour | Sally A. Powell^{†} (Note: Powell was a sitting councillor for Avonmore ward) | 1,597 | |
| Labour | Sean A. Reddin | 1,543 | |
| Conservative | John C.B. Bradley | 978 | 36.91 |
| Conservative | Nicholas B. Botterill | 940 | |
| Conservative | Roderick J.H.McL. Corrie | 924 | |
| Registered electors | | 5,755 | |
| Turnout | | 2780 | 48.31 |
| Rejected ballots | | 13 | 0.47 |
| Labour hold | | | |
| Labour hold | | | |
| Labour hold | | | |
