= 1994 Hammersmith and Fulham London Borough Council election =

1994 local election in England

1994 Hammersmith and Fulham Borough Council election
- 5 May 1994

All 50 seats up for election to Hammersmith and Fulham London Borough Council 26 seats needed for a majority
- Registered: 102,984
- Turnout: 47,648, 46.27% (▼6.89)

	First party	Second party	Third party
Leader	Iain Coleman	Gerald A. Wombwell	Alexandra E. Sugden
Party	Labour	Conservative	Liberal Democrats
Leader since	14 May 1989	17 May 1991	Unknown
Leader's seat	Gibbs Green	Sulivan	Eel Brook
Last election	28 seats, 50.60%	22 seats, 41.39%	0 seats, 5.48%
Seats before	25 (Note: By the time of the election there were 3 vacant seats that Labour had won at the last election, as there wasn't enough time to have a separate by-election)	22	0
Seats won	33	15	2
Seat change	▲5	▼7	▲2
Popular vote	52,122	34,523	10,395
Percentage	53.44%	35.40%	10.66%
Swing	▲2.84	▼5.99	▲5.18
- Map of the results of the 1994 Hammersmith and Fulham council election. Conservatives in blue and Labour in red.
Council control before election
No overall control
Council control after election
Labour

The 1994 Hammersmith and Fulham Borough Council election took place on 5 May 1994 to elect members of Hammersmith and Fulham London Borough Council in London, England. The whole council was up for election and the Labour Party regained overall control of the council, which it had lost during the previous council term.

== Background ==
The Labour Party had won overall control of the council at the previous election in 1990, with 28 out of the 50 seats. However, by the time of the 1994 election, the defection of two Labour councillors from the party (while remaining councillors) and the resignation of three other Labour councillors from their seats (which remained vacant on the eve of polling day) meant that by the end of the previous council's term, Labour held just 23 of the 47 occupied seats, with the Conservatives on 22 and 2 independents; the council was therefore under no overall control.

== Election result ==
1994 Hammersmith and Fulham London Borough Council elections
Party	Seats	Gains	Losses	Net gain/loss	Seats %	Votes %	Votes	+/−
Labour	33	5	0	▲5	66.00	53.44	52,122	▲2.84
Conservative	15	0	7	▼7	30.00	35.40	34,523	▼5.99
Liberal Democrats	2	2	0	▲2	4.00	10.66	10,395	▲5.18
Green	0	0	0	Steady	0.00	0.49	491	▼1.02
Total	50						97,531	

The Labour Party won 33 seats - a gain of five seats from the 1990 result, and restored their control of the council.

The Conservative Party won 15 seats - a loss of 7 seats from their previous result.

The Liberal Democrats won a single seat in the Eel Brook ward on election night with Alexandra Sugden - the other seat going to Labour's Bill Dann by a single vote over Simon Thompson for the Lib Dems. But a subsequent case in the High Court concerning the validity of an individual ballot resulted in Mr Thompson gaining a vote and becoming tied with Mr Dann for the second seat. The drawing of lots was required to separate the tied candidates, in which Simon Thompson was the lucky winner. This meant the Lib Dems gained two seats from the previous election.

== Ward results ==
(*) - Indicates an incumbent candidate

(†) - Indicates an incumbent candidate standing in a different ward

=== Addison ===
Addison (2)
Party	Candidate	Votes	%	±%
Labour	Jacqueline Abbott^{†} (Note: Abbott was a sitting councillor representing the Broadway ward)	1,203	59.21	▲3.49
Labour	Jane Hackworth-Young* (Note: Hackworth-Young replaced Cllr Bridget Prentice after her resignation in 1992)	1,182		
Conservative	Joseph Brown	486	22.98	▼11.67
Conservative	Nigel Salisbury	440		
Liberal Democrats	George Collie	248	12.31	New
Green	Cherry Puddicombe	125	5.51	▼4.12
Green	Roger Crosskey	96		
Registered electors		4,512		▲260
Turnout		2,063	45.72	▼8.52
Rejected ballots		4	0.19	▼0.03
Labour hold				
Labour hold				

=== Avonmore ===
Avonmore (2)
Party	Candidate	Votes	%	±%
Labour	Keith Mallinson	793	43.97	▲6.07
Conservative	Sonya Hilton	728	42.14	▼9.61
Conservative	Julian Muller*	692		
Labour	Paul Philippou	689		
Liberal Democrats	Peter Stigant	234	13.89	New
Registered electors		4,029		▲13
Turnout		1,660	41.20	▼5.04
Rejected ballots		0	0.00	▼0.32
Labour gain from Conservative				
Conservative hold				

=== Broadway ===
Broadway (2)
Party	Candidate	Votes	%	±%
Labour	Kenneth Cartwright* (Note: Cartwright replaced Cllr Kenneth Burlton after his resignation in 1992)	1,010	56.37	▲2.07
Labour	Louanne Tranchell	883		
Conservative	Paul Jones	488	28.57	▼0.95
Conservative	David Rutley	471		
Liberal Democrats	Gavin Collins	273	15.06	▲2.30
Liberal Democrats	Kevin Pakenham	232		
Registered electors		3,690		▲83
Turnout		1,790	48.51	▼6.41
Rejected ballots		2	0.11	▼0.14
Labour hold				
Labour hold				

=== Brook Green ===
Brook Green (2)
Party	Candidate	Votes	%	±%
Labour	Gerald Johnson	943	43.40	▲6.16
Conservative	John Hennessy*	884	41.12	▼13.40
Labour	Paul O'Connor	883		
Conservative	Roderick Corrie	846		
Liberal Democrats	Patrick Curry	344	15.48	▲7.24
Liberal Democrats	Ronald Wiffen	307		
Registered electors		4,675		▲465
Turnout		2,197	46.99	▼7.71
Rejected ballots		5	0.23	▲0.06
Labour gain from Conservative				
Conservative hold				

=== Colehill ===
Colehill (2)
Party	Candidate	Votes	%	±%
Conservative	Adronie Alford*	986	52.29	▼0.68
Conservative	Antony Lillis*	951		
Labour	Frederick Inniss^{†} (Note: Inniss was a sitting councillor representing the College Park and Old Oak ward)	685	35.78	▼2.75
Labour	Neil Mills	640		
Liberal Democrats	Helen Douglas-Mann	236	11.93	New
Liberal Democrats	Suzanna Harris	206		
Registered electors		4,272		▲131
Turnout		1,943	45.48	▼11.41
Rejected ballots		2	0.10	▲0.02
Conservative hold				
Conservative hold				

=== College Park and Old Oak ===
College Park and Old Oak (3)
Party	Candidate	Votes	%	±%
Labour	Lester Holloway	1,507	76.47	▲19.01
Labour	Wes Harcourt	1,439		
Labour	Reginald Mclaughlin	1,382		
Conservative	Jeremy Hunt	266	13.14	▼14.48
Conservative	Andrew Macdonald	255		
Liberal Democrats	Sean Williams	224	10.39	▼2.37
Conservative	Julie Perrin	223		
Liberal Democrats	William Slingsby	168		
Registered electors		5,186		▼135
Turnout		2,098	40.46	▼4.85
Rejected ballots		5	0.24	▲0.07
Labour hold				
Labour hold				
Labour hold				

=== Coningham ===
Coningham (3)
Party	Candidate	Votes	%	±%
Labour	Christine Graham*	1,831	69.67	▲9.87
Labour	Benjamin Simms	1,750		
Labour	Josephine Wicks*	1,670		
Conservative	Christopher Frazer	417	15.13	▼7.99
Liberal Democrats	Ilona Lepper	386	15.21	New
Conservative	James Bullock	379		
Liberal Democrats	Deborah Sutherland	377		
Conservative	Piers Pressdee	344		
Registered electors		6,452		▲432
Turnout		2,641	40.93	▼2.87
Rejected ballots		9	0.34	▲0.23
Labour hold				
Labour hold				
Labour hold				

=== Crabtree ===
Crabtree (2)
Party	Candidate	Votes	%	±%
Conservative	Guy Mortimer*	908	43.36	▼0.17
Labour	Adam Gray	832	40.64	▼8.58
Conservative	Kenneth Petrie	810		
Labour	Paul Richards	778		
Liberal Democrats	Hector Macdonald	214	9.59	▲2.34
Liberal Democrats	Tamara Dragadze	165		
Green	Laura Davenport	127	6.41	New
Registered electors		3,888		▲49
Turnout		2,037	52.39	▼9.48
Rejected ballots		2	0.10	▼0.24
Conservative hold				
Labour gain from Conservative				

=== Eel Brook ===
Eel Brook (2)
Party	Candidate	Votes	%	±%
Liberal Democrats	Alexandra Sugden	782	35.44	New
Liberal Democrats	Simon Thompson	697		
Labour	Bill Dann	697	32.42	▼15.80
Conservative	Alexander Karmel* (Note: Karmel replaced Cllr Andrew Robathan after his resignation in 1992)	674	32.14	▼19.64
Conservative	David Thorp*	668		
Labour	Arthur Lott	656		
Registered electors		4,004		▲416
Turnout		2,171	54.22	▼1.74
Rejected ballots		2	0.14	▼0.11
Liberal Democrats gain from Conservative				
Liberal Democrats gain from Conservative				

=== Gibbs Green ===
Gibbs Green (2)
Party	Candidate	Votes	%	±%
Labour	Iain Coleman*	1,070	55.97	▼2.23
Labour	Andy Slaughter*	1,037		
Conservative	Matthew Dobbs	609	31.44	▼7.90
Conservative	Philippa Roe	575		
Liberal Democrats	lain Barclay	261	12.59	▲5.67
Liberal Democrats	Gerald Killingworth	213		
Registered electors		4,482		▲439
Turnout		1,951	43.53	▼11.65
Rejected ballots		2	0.10	▼0.39
Labour hold				
Labour hold				

=== Grove ===
Grove (2)
Party	Candidate	Votes	%	±%
Labour	Leslie Aldridge*	1,117	54.12	▲4.89
Labour	Adam Farrar	1,091		
Conservative	Lesley-Anne Brennan	680	32.50	▼7.08
Conservative	Nicholas Botterill	645		
Liberal Democrats	Timothy Ward	273	13.38	▲2.19
Registered electors		4,269		▲397
Turnout		2,029	47.53	▼6.86
Rejected ballots		4	0.20	▼0.27
Labour hold				
Labour hold				

=== Margravine ===
Margravine (2)
Party	Candidate	Votes	%	±%
Labour	Shirley Spiers	1,164	59.89	▼0.56
Labour	Lisa Homan	1,161		
Conservative	Jonathan Pemberton	556	27.96	▼2.79
Conservative	John Pickthorn	530		
Liberal Democrats	Gerald Milch	236	12.15	▲4.45
Registered electors		3,993		▼46
Turnout		1,982	49.64	▼3.49
Rejected ballots		4	0.20	▼0.37
Labour hold				
Labour hold				

=== Normand ===
Normand (2)
Party	Candidate	Votes	%	±%
Labour	Eleanor Caruana*	1,050	53.06	▲0.23
Labour	Valerie Barker	1,013		
Conservative	Tim Davie	707	34.96	▼4.16
Conservative	William Yonge	652		
Liberal Democrats	Martin Bryant	238	11.98	▲7.66
Liberal Democrats	Russell Pyne	227		
Registered electors		4,352		▲13
Turnout		2,083	47.86	▼4.89
Rejected ballots		7	0.34	▲0.21
Labour hold				
Labour hold				

=== Palace ===
Palace (2)
Party	Candidate	Votes	%	±%
Conservative	Emile Al-Uzaizi*	1,375	69.37	▼0.54
Conservative	Andrew Ground* (Note: Ground replaced Cllr Rosemary Belhaven after her death in 1992)	1,375		
Labour	Louise Coubrough	428	20.59	▲1.46
Labour	Francis Lukey	388		
Liberal Democrats	Terence Frisby	227	10.04	New
Liberal Democrats	David Jacques	171		
Registered electors		3,915		▼173
Turnout		2,055	52.49	▼10.63
Rejected ballots		3	0.15	▲0.02
Conservative hold				
Conservative hold				

=== Ravenscourt ===
Ravenscourt (2)
Party	Candidate	Votes	%	±%
Labour	Huw Davies	834	42.97	▲5.67
Conservative	Angela Clarke*	814	42.01	▼4.67
Labour	Julian Hillman	774		
Conservative	William Smith*	757		
Liberal Democrats	Bruce Douglas-Mann	220	11.17	▲7.42
Liberal Democrats	Ann Wates	198		
Green	Edward McInnes	78	3.85	▼6.11
Green	John Phillips	65		
Registered electors		3,883		▼20
Turnout		1,945	50.09	▼4.43
Rejected ballots		2	0.10	▲0.01
Labour gain from Conservative				
Conservative hold				

=== Sands End ===
Sands End (2)
Party	Candidate	Votes	%	±%
Labour	Brendan Bird	1,030	51.08	▼0.78
Labour	Nadeem Aftab*	1,008		
Conservative	Michael Brennan	802	39.15	▲1.71
Conservative	Stephen Greenhalgh	759		
Liberal Democrats	Mary McNamee	216	9.77	▲2.83
Liberal Democrats	Gabrielle Minken	173		
Registered electors		4,577		▲250
Turnout		2,089	45.64	▼7.61
Rejected ballots		4	0.19	▼0.2
Labour hold				
Labour hold				

=== Sherbrooke ===
Sherbrooke (2)
Party	Candidate	Votes	%	±%
Conservative	Celia Johnson*	776	45.21	▼3.02
Labour	John Garrett	756	43.64	▼1.06
Conservative	Alan Thomas*	716		
Labour	Daniel Filson	683		
Liberal Democrats	Alastair Brett	184	11.15	New
Registered electors		3,402		▲132
Turnout		1,666	48.97	▼8.98
Rejected ballots		1	0.06	▼0.26
Conservative hold				
Labour gain from Conservative				

=== Starch Green ===
Starch Green (2)
Party	Candidate	Votes	%	±%
Labour	David Williams*	1,073	53.86	▲1.80
Labour	Timothy Stanley*	1,063		
Conservative	Elizabeth St Clair-Legge	602	30.26	▼8.55
Conservative	Peter Stephens	597		
Liberal Democrats	Louise Burden	317	15.89	▲6.76
Liberal Democrats	Hilary Moss	313		
Registered electors		4,059		▲119
Turnout		2,072	51.05	▼4.86
Rejected ballots		6	0.29	▲0.06
Labour hold				
Labour hold				

=== Sulivan ===
Sulivan (2)
Party	Candidate	Votes	%	±%
Conservative	Gerald Wombwell*	1,048	54.19	▼4.44
Conservative	Jonathan Maiden*	1,019		
Labour	Anthony Bird	717	34.38	▼0.60
Labour	Jeffrey Kenner	595		
Liberal Democrats	Joan Bonser	234	11.43	▲5.04
Liberal Democrats	Peter Crystal	201		
Registered electors		4,004		▲72
Turnout		1,996	49.85	▼10.27
Rejected ballots		4	0.20	▲0.12
Conservative hold				
Conservative hold				

=== Town ===
Town (2)
Party	Candidate	Votes	%	±%
Conservative	Antony Glover* (Note: Glover replaced Cllr Terence McGrath after his resignation in 1992)	1,027	55.10	▼6.06
Conservative	Mark Loveday	995		
Labour	Tracey Brader	589	31.33	▼0.55
Labour	Stephen Brennan	561		
Liberal Democrats	Leonard Bonser	260	13.57	▲6.61
Liberal Democrats	Allan McKelvie	238		
Registered electors		4,315		▲308
Turnout		1,931	44.75	▼12.35
Rejected ballots		7	0.36	▲0.01
Conservative hold				
Conservative hold				

=== Walham ===
Walham (2)
Party	Candidate	Votes	%	±%
Conservative	Elizabeth Mills	1,085	48.76	▼1.77
Conservative	Frances Stainton*	1,071		
Labour	Janet Dowiatt	891	39.17	▼2.97
Labour	Ahmed Aftab	840		
Liberal Democrats	Michael Woolcott	267	12.08	▲5.02
Registered electors		4,986		▲149
Turnout		2,243	44.99	▼6.32
Rejected ballots		6	0.27	▼0.13
Conservative hold				
Conservative hold				

=== White City and Shepherds Bush ===
White City and Shepherds Bush (3)
Party	Candidate	Votes	%	±%
Labour	Ronald Browne*	1,880	71.96	▼8.83
Labour	Graham Jones	1,767		
Labour	Abu Khaled	1,598		
Conservative	John Bradley	408	14.12	▼5.09
Liberal Democrats	Michael Boudry	338	13.92	New
Conservative	Albert Crosby	319		
Conservative	Eileen Crewdson	301		
Registered electors		6,336		▲328
Turnout		2,606	41.13	▼5.72
Rejected ballots		7	0.27	▼0.09
Labour hold				
Labour hold				
Labour hold				

=== Wormholt ===
Wormholt (3)
Party	Candidate	Votes	%	±%
Labour	Colin Aherne*	1,570	62.34	▼0.75
Labour	Stephen Burke	1,479		
Labour	Sally Powell*	1,422		
Conservative	Gregory Barker	672	25.19	▼11.72
Conservative	Elizabeth Fortescue-Hitchins	577		
Conservative	Andrew Ive	557		
Liberal Democrats	Elizabeth de Mowbray	298	12.47	New
Registered electors		5,703		▼52
Turnout		2,400	42.08	▼6.23
Rejected ballots		5	0.21	▼0.26
Labour hold				
Labour hold				
Labour hold				
