= Chelsea and Fulham =

UK Parliament constituency (since 2010)

Coordinates: 51.48°N 0.19°W

- Borough constituency for the House of Commons
- Interactive map of boundaries from 2024
- Location within Greater London
- County: Greater London
- Population: 121,100 (2022)
- Electorate: 76,481 (March 2020)

Current constituency
- Created: 2010
- Member of Parliament: Benjamin Coleman (Labour)
- Seats: One
- Created from: Kensington and Chelsea, Hammersmith and Fulham

Chelsea and Fulham is a constituency in Greater London represented since 2024 in the House of Commons of the UK Parliament by Benjamin Coleman of the Labour Party. It was established for the 2010 general election.

== Constituency profile ==
The constituency is located in Inner London and is named after the neighbourhoods of Chelsea and Fulham. Much of the area was industrial but has been redeveloped during the 20th century. It is now mostly affluent, although there is deprivation and social housing in the World's End area. The average house price in the constituency is double that of the rest of London and more than four times the national average. The football grounds at Stamford Bridge and Craven Cottage are in the constituency, which is the chosen home of many of London's elite footballers as well as other wealthy celebrities. The constituency includes the fashionable King's Road thoroughfare, a popular destination for shopping and culture.

Compared to national averages, residents of Chelsea and Fulham are young, well-educated and more likely to work in professional occupations. White people make up 70% of the population, higher than the rest of London, although White British people are only 42%; the area has large French and American communities. Most of the constituency is represented by Conservatives at the local council level, with some Labour Party councillors in the north of Fulham. An estimated 69% of voters in the constituency supported remaining in the European Union in the 2016 referendum, a proportion higher than the rest of London and considerably higher than the rest of the country.

== Boundaries ==
=== 2010–2024 ===
Map of boundaries 2010-2024

Following the review of parliamentary representation in London, the boroughs of Kensington and Chelsea and Hammersmith and Fulham were paired for constituency allocation purposes and allocated three seats between them.

This broke the previous pairings of Kensington and Chelsea with the City of Westminster, and of Hammersmith and Fulham with the London Borough of Ealing, and therefore abolished the seats Hammersmith and Fulham and Kensington and Chelsea with their "spillover" cross-boundary seats of Regents Park and Kensington North and Ealing Acton and Shepherds Bush.

The historical constituency of Kensington was recreated, and the Hammersmith seat was also revived.

The new constituency of Chelsea and Fulham was made up of the following electoral wards:

- From the London Borough of Hammersmith and Fulham: Fulham Broadway, Munster, Palace Riverside, Parsons Green and Walham, Sands End, Town.
- From the Royal Borough of Kensington and Chelsea: Brompton and Hans Town, Chelsea Riverside, Redcliffe, Royal Hospital, Stanley.

=== Current ===
Following the 2023 review of Westminster constituencies, which came into effect for the 2024 general election, the constituency is composed of:

- The London Borough of Hammersmith and Fulham wards of Fulham Reach, Fulham Town, Lillie, Munster, Palace & Hurlingham, Parsons Green & Sandford, Sands End, Walham Green, and West Kensington.
- The Royal Borough of Kensington and Chelsea wards of Chelsea Riverside, Redcliffe, Royal Hospital, and Stanley.

The new boundaries reflect the local authority boundary reviews which came into effect in May 2022. To bring the electorate within the permitted range, the Hammersmith and Fulham wards of Fulham Reach and West Kensington were transferred in from the abolished constituency of Hammersmith. The whole of the Kensington and Chelsea ward of Brompton and Hans Town is now included in the new constituency of Kensington and Bayswater.

== Political history ==
The constituency includes affluent areas and opulent private housing. The small amount of social housing in the constituency is concentrated in the smaller than ward-size Worlds End Estate. An alternative in-depth analysis, of local elections, confirms one ward has seen opposition members in elections since the 1980s, of 11 wards forming the seat. At the 2010 election, only five other constituencies voted more strongly for the Conservative Party: Richmond (Yorkshire), Beaconsfield in Buckinghamshire, Windsor (Berkshire), Hampshire North East and Chesham and Amersham also in Buckinghamshire.

Somewhat surprisingly, however, in the 2017 United Kingdom general election the Conservative majority in Chelsea and Fulham was almost halved from 16,022 to 8,188, making it only the eighth-safest Conservative seat in Greater London (with several other seats such as Romford and Bexleyheath and Crayford proving safer for the Tories despite previously electing Labour MPs in the Blair era, whilst Chelsea never did).

The 2019 election saw a resurgence in the Liberal Democrat vote, which saw them take second place, but this was reversed in the 2024 election when Labour came through from third place in 2019 to win the seat by 152 votes over the Conservatives.

In the early 1960s the Chelsea Labour Party (old boundaries) created the National Campaign for the Young Chronic Sick, led by constituency member (Mr) Marsh Dickson, which generated national TV and newspaper coverage leading to the Chronically Sick and Disabled Persons Act 1970 promoted as a Private Members Bill by Alf Morris MP.

== Members of Parliament ==
| Election | Member | Party |
|---|---|---|
| 2010 | Greg Hands | Conservative |
| 2024 | Ben Coleman | Labour |

== Elections ==
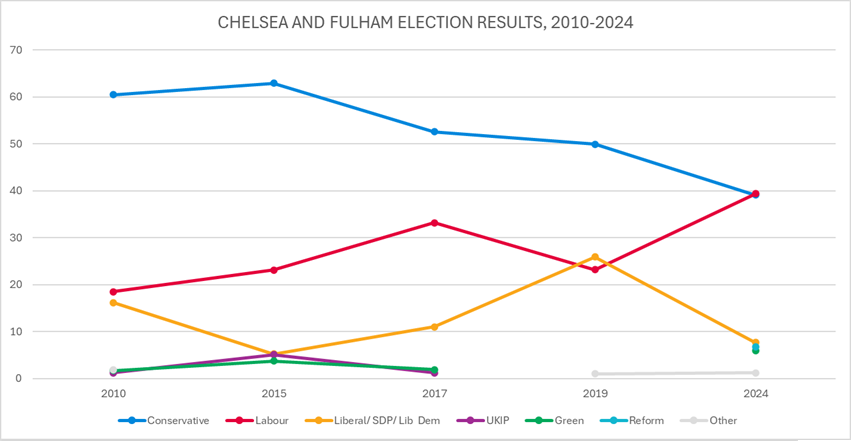
Election results 2010–2024

For results of predecessor seats, see Kensington and Chelsea, and Hammersmith and Fulham.

=== Elections in the 2020s ===
General election 2024: Chelsea and Fulham
| Party | Candidate | Votes | % | ±% |
|---|---|---|---|---|
| Labour | Ben Coleman | 18,556 | 39.4 | +10.3 |
| Conservative | Greg Hands | 18,404 | 39.1 | −6.4 |
| Liberal Democrats | Blaise Baquiche | 3,611 | 7.7 | −16.1 |
| Reform | Anthony Goodwin | 3,144 | 6.7 | +6.4 |
| Green | Mona Crocker | 2,798 | 5.9 | +5.5 |
| Workers Party | Sabi Patwary | 538 | 1.1 | N/A |
| Heritage | David Poulden | 65 | 0.1 | N/A |
| Majority | | 152 | 0.3 | |
| Turnout | | 47,116 | 60.1 | −11.6 |
| Registered electors | | 78,468 | | |
| Labour gain from Conservative | | Swing | +8.4 | |

=== Elections in the 2010s ===
2019 notional result (Note: Estimate of the 2019 general election result as if the revised boundaries recommended under the 2023 boundary review were in place)
| Party | Vote | % |
|---|---|---|
| Conservative | 24,909 | 45.5 |
| Labour | 15,916 | 29.1 |
| Liberal Democrats | 13,053 | 23.8 |
| Others | 500 | 0.9 |
| Green | 228 | 0.4 |
| Brexit Party | 175 | 0.3 |
| Majority | 8,993 | 16.4 |
| Turnout | 54,781 | 71.6 |
| Electorate | 76,481 | |

General election 2019: Chelsea and Fulham
| Party | Candidate | Votes | % | ±% |
|---|---|---|---|---|
| Conservative | Greg Hands | 23,345 | 49.9 | −2.7 |
| Liberal Democrats | Nicola Horlick | 12,104 | 25.9 | +14.9 |
| Labour | Matt Uberoi | 10,872 | 23.2 | −10.0 |
| Animal Welfare | Sam Morland | 500 | 1.0 | N/A |
| Majority | | 11,241 | 24.0 | +4.6 |
| Turnout | | 46,821 | 69.8 | +3.7 |
| Registered electors | | 67,110 | | |
| Conservative hold | | Swing | −8.8 | |

General election 2017: Chelsea and Fulham
| Party | Candidate | Votes | % | ±% |
|---|---|---|---|---|
| Conservative | Greg Hands | 22,179 | 52.6 | −10.3 |
| Labour | Alan De'Ath | 13,991 | 33.2 | +10.1 |
| Liberal Democrats | Louise Rowntree | 4,627 | 11.0 | +5.8 |
| Green | Bill Cashmore | 807 | 1.9 | −1.8 |
| UKIP | Alasdair Seton-Marsden | 524 | 1.2 | −3.9 |
| Majority | | 8,188 | 19.4 | −20.4 |
| Turnout | | 42,128 | 66.1 | +2.7 |
| Registered electors | | 63,728 | | |
| Conservative hold | | Swing | −10.3 | |

General election 2015: Chelsea and Fulham
| Party | Candidate | Votes | % | ±% |
|---|---|---|---|---|
| Conservative | Greg Hands | 25,322 | 62.9 | +2.4 |
| Labour | Alexandra Sanderson | 9,300 | 23.1 | +4.6 |
| Liberal Democrats | Simon Bailey | 2,091 | 5.2 | −11.0 |
| UKIP | Adrian Noble | 2,039 | 5.1 | +3.9 |
| Green | Guy Rubin | 1,474 | 3.7 | +2.0 |
| Majority | | 16,022 | 39.8 | −2.2 |
| Turnout | | 40,226 | 63.4 | +3.3 |
| Registered electors | | 63,478 | | |
| Conservative hold | | Swing | −1.1 | |

General election 2010: Chelsea and Fulham
| Party | Candidate | Votes | % | ±% |
|---|---|---|---|---|
| Conservative | Greg Hands | 24,093 | 60.5 | |
| Labour | Alex Hilton | 7,371 | 18.5 | |
| Liberal Democrats | Dirk Hazell | 6,473 | 16.2 | |
| Green | Julia Stephenson | 671 | 1.7 | |
| UKIP | Tim Gittos | 478 | 1.2 | |
| BNP | Brian McDonald | 388 | 1.0 | |
| New Independent Conservative | Roland Courtenay | 196 | 0.5 | |
| English Democrat | George Roseman | 169 | 0.4 | |
| Blue Environment | Godfrey Spickernell | 17 | 0.0 | |
| Majority | | 16,722 | 42.0 | |
| Turnout | | 39,856 | 60.1 | |
| Registered electors | | 66,257 | | |
| Conservative win (new seat) | | | | |

* Served as an MP in the 2005–2010 Parliament

The new seat of Chelsea and Fulham was fought for the first time at the 2010 general election, when it had a notional Conservative majority of over 10,000 based on 2005 election results.

== See also ==
- List of parliamentary constituencies in London
