= 1998 Hammersmith and Fulham London Borough Council election =

1998 local election in England

1998 Hammersmith and Fulham Borough Council election
- 7 May 1998

All 50 seats to Hammersmith and Fulham London Borough Council 26 seats needed for a majority
- Registered: 111,776
- Turnout: 38,201, 34.18% (▼12.09)

	First party	Second party	Third party
Leader	Andrew Slaughter	Unknown	Unknown
Party	Labour	Conservative	Liberal Democrats
Leader since	1996	Unknown	Unknown
Leader's seat	Gibbs Green	Unknown	Unknown
Last election	33 seats, 53.44%	15 seats, 35.9%	2 seats, 10.66%
Seats before	34 (Note: They did have 35 seats but shortly before the election one of their seats became vacant without enough time to hold a by-election)	14 (Note: Conservatives lost 1 seat in a by-election following the resignation of Cllr. Guy Mortimer in 1996)	1
Seats won	36	14	0
Seat change	▲3	▼1	▼2
Popular vote	40,634	28,302	7,842
Percentage	52.86%	36.82%	10.20%
Swing	▼0.58	▲1.42	▼0.46
- Map of the results of the 1998 Hammersmith and Fulham council election. Conservatives in blue and Labour in red.
Council control before election
Labour
Council control after election
Labour

The 1998 Hammersmith and Fulham Council election took place on 7 May 1998 to elect members of Hammersmith and Fulham London Borough Council in London, England. The whole council was up for election and the Labour party stayed in overall control of the council.

== Election result ==
The Labour Party won 36 seats (on a 49.7% share of the vote) - a gain of 3 seats from the previous election, and maintained control of the council. The Conservative Party won 14 seats (with 37.4% of the vote) - a loss of 1 seat from their previous result. The Liberal Democrats lost the two seats they previously held, winning 12.6% of the votes cast.

1998 Hammersmith and Fulham London Borough Council election results
Party	Seats	Gains	Losses	Net gain/loss	Seats %	Votes %	Votes	+/−
Labour	36	4	3	▲1	72.00	52.86	40,634	▼0.58
Conservative	14	4	4	Steady	28.00	36.82	28,302	▲1.42
Liberal Democrats	0	0	1	▼1	0.00	10.20	7,842	▼0.46
Communist League	0	0	0	Steady	0.00	0.12	90	New
Total	50						76,868	

== Ward results ==
(*) - Indicates an incumbent candidate

(†) - Indicates an incumbent candidate standing in a different ward

=== Addison ===
Addison (2)
Party	Candidate	Votes	%	±%
Labour	Siobhan Coughlan	1,035	57.39	▼1.82
Labour	Ghassan Karian	887		
Conservative	Jolyon Neubert	422	24.99	▲2.01
Conservative	Michael Woolton	415		
Liberal Democrats	George Collie	295	17.62	▲5.31
Registered electors		5,178		▲666
Turnout		1,686	32.56	▼13.16
Rejected ballots		25	1.48	▲1.29
Labour hold				
Labour hold				

=== Avonmore ===
Avonmore (2)
Party	Candidate	Votes	%	±%
Conservative	Sonya Hilton*	728	45.58	▲3.44
Labour	Keith Mallinson*	697	42.41	▼1.57
Conservative	James Browne	684		
Labour	Frederick Inniss	617		
Liberal Democrats	Julie Perrin	186	12.01	▼1.88
Registered electors		4,597		▲568
Turnout		1,570	34.15	▼7.05
Rejected ballots		12	0.76	▲0.76
Conservative gain from Labour				
Labour gain from Conservative				

=== Broadway ===
Broadway (2)
Party	Candidate	Votes	%	±%
Labour	Kenneth Cartwright*	831	65.72	▲9.35
Labour	Huw Davies^{†} (Note: Davies was a sitting councillor representing the Ravenscourt ward)	816		
Conservative	Tara Douglas-Home	283	20.11	▼8.46
Conservative	Bozidar Zabavnik	221		
Liberal Democrats	Martin Bryant	203	14.17	▼0.89
Liberal Democrats	Henry Braund	152		
Registered electors		3,910		▲220
Turnout		1,354	34.63	▼13.88
Rejected ballots		18	1.33	▲1.22
Labour hold				
Labour hold				

=== Brook Green ===
Brook Green (2)
Party	Candidate	Votes	%	±%
Labour	Gerald Johnson*	916	47.46	▲4.06
Labour	Polly Hicks	885		
Conservative	John Hennessy*	823	42.05	▲0.93
Conservative	Margaret Massey	773		
Liberal Democrats	Joanna Gill	233	10.49	▼4.99
Liberal Democrats	Ilona Lepper	165		
Registered electors		5,451		▲776
Turnout		1,995	36.60	▼10.39
Rejected ballots		6	0.30	▲0.07
Labour hold				
Labour gain from Conservative				

=== Colehill ===
Colehill (2)
Party	Candidate	Votes	%	±%
Conservative	Adronie Alford*	834	59.66	▲7.37
Conservative	Christopher Round	806		
Labour	Paul Richards	410	29.72	▼6.06
Labour	Winifred Watson	407		
Liberal Democrats	Suzanna Harris	146	10.62	▼1.31
Registered electors		4,703		▲431
Turnout		1,402	29.81	▼15.67
Rejected ballots		7	0.50	▲0.40
Conservative hold				
Conservative hold				

=== College Park and Old Oak ===
College Park and Old Oak (3)
Party	Candidate	Votes	%	±%
Labour	Wes Harcourt*	967	74.15	▼2.32
Labour	Reginald McLaughlin*	935		
Labour	Melanie Smallman^{†} (Note: Smallman was a sitting councillor representing the Crabtree ward, a ward she was elected to in a by-election following the resignation of Cllr Guy Mortimer in 1996)	863		
Conservative	Linda Scanlon	224	15.87	▲2.73
Conservative	Theresa Coen	205		
Conservative	Anthony Sulivan	163		
Liberal Democrats	William Chambre	143	9.98	▼0.41
Liberal Democrats	William Wiggin	125		
Liberal Democrats	William Yonge	104		
Registered electors		4,754		▼432
Turnout		1,387	29.18	▼11.28
Rejected ballots		10	0.72	▲0.48
Labour hold				
Labour hold				
Labour hold				

=== Coningham ===
Coningham (3)
Party	Candidate	Votes	%	±%
Labour	Christine Graham*	1,368	61.15	▼8.52
Labour	Josephine Wicks*	1,165		
Labour	Timothy Stanley^{†} (Note: Stanley was a sitting councillor representing the Starch Green ward)	1,039		
Liberal Democrats	Patricia Owen	390	18.98	▲3.77
Liberal Democrats	Sheila Shuttleworth	349		
Conservative	Mark Loveday	308	15.25	▲0.12
Conservative	Elizabeth Mills	298		
Conservative	Hugh Robertson	285		
Communist League	Celia Pugh	90	4.62	New
Registered electors		7,539		▲1,087
Turnout		2,008	26.63	▼14.30
Rejected ballots		26	1.29	▲0.95
Labour hold				
Labour hold				
Labour hold				

=== Crabtree ===
Crabtree (2)
Party	Candidate	Votes	%	±%
Labour	Adam Gray*	973	46.76	▲6.12
Conservative	Mark Simonds	904	46.52	▲3.16
Conservative	Timothy Janman	889		
Labour	Simon Risley	829		
Liberal Democrats	Tamara Dragadze	135	6.72	▼2.87
Liberal Democrats	Donald Gray-Raus	124		
Registered electors		4,297		▲409
Turnout		2,037	47.41	▼4.98
Rejected ballots		11	0.54	▲0.44
Labour hold				
Conservative gain from Labour				

=== Eel Brook ===
Eel Brook (2)
Party	Candidate	Votes	%	±%
Conservative	Donal Blaney	810	47.65	▲15.51
Conservative	Greg Hands	810		
Labour	David Gwynne	582	32.79	▲0.37
Labour	Hugh Jaeger	533		
Liberal Democrats	Jon Burden	346	19.56	▼15.88
Liberal Democrats	Huw Lloyd-James	319		
Registered electors		4,341		▲337
Turnout		1,772	40.82	▼13.40
Rejected ballots		4	0.23	▲0.09
Conservative gain from Liberal Democrats				
Conservative gain from Labour				

=== Gibbs Green ===
Gibbs Green (2)
Party	Candidate	Votes	%	±%
Labour	Andy Slaughter*	775	59.81	▲3.84
Labour	Charles Treloggan* (Note: Treloggan was elected in a by-election triggered by the resignation of Cllr Iain Coleman in 1997)	765		
Conservative	Rowena Everson	354	25.20	▼6.24
Conservative	Jocelyn Ormon	295		
Liberal Democrats	Anne Lloyd-James	193	14.99	▲2.40
Registered electors		5,153		▲671
Turnout		1,335	25.91	▼17.62
Rejected ballots		9	0.67	▲0.57
Labour hold				
Labour hold				

=== Grove ===
Grove (2)
Party	Candidate	Votes	%	±%
Labour	Christopher Allen	992	56.62	▲2.50
Labour	Stephen Cowan	860		
Conservative	Amand Lloyd-Harris	487	28.55	▼3.95
Conservative	Edward Wilson	447		
Liberal Democrats	Michael Andrew	249	14.83	▲1.45
Liberal Democrats	Sophie Emmerson	236		
Registered electors		4,680		▲411
Turnout		1,747	37.33	▼10.20
Rejected ballots		15	0.86	▲0.66
Labour hold				
Labour hold				

=== Margravine ===
Margravine (2)
Party	Candidate	Votes	%	±%
Labour	Araminta Birdsey	802	65.87	▲5.98
Labour	Lisa Homan	790		
Conservative	Albert Crosby	280	22.92	▼5.04
Conservative	Pamela Hurst	274		
Liberal Democrats	Sorcha Cassidy	146	11.21	▼0.94
Liberal Democrats	Daniel Watkins	125		
Registered electors		4,292		▲299
Turnout		1,289	30.03	▼19.61
Rejected ballots		15	1.16	▲0.96
Labour hold				
Labour hold				

=== Normand ===
Normand (2)
Party	Candidate	Votes	%	±%
Labour	Joan Caruana*	775	47.04	▼6.02
Labour	David Williams^{†} (Note: Williams was a sitting councillor representing the Starch Green ward)	711		
Conservative	Magnus Burroughe	670	42.07	▲7.11
Conservative	Nicholas Addyman	659		
Liberal Democrats	Gabrielle Minken	172	10.89	▼1.09
Registered electors		4,294		▼58
Turnout		1,602	37.31	▼10.55
Rejected ballots		13	0.81	▲0.47
Labour hold				
Labour hold				

=== Palace ===
Palace (2)
Party	Candidate	Votes	%	±%
Conservative	Emile Al-Uzaizi*	1,345	73.05	▲3.68
Conservative	Andrew Ground*	1,316		
Labour	Adam Farrar	315	17.29	▼3.30
Labour	Francis Lukey	315		
Liberal Democrats	Alexandra Sugden	176	9.66	▼0.38
Registered electors		4,124		▲209
Turnout		1,843	44.69	▼7.80
Rejected ballots		12	0.65	▲0.50
Conservative hold				
Conservative hold				

=== Ravenscourt ===
Ravenscourt (2)
Party	Candidate	Votes	%	±%
Labour	Fiona Evans-Lothian	881	51.33	▲8.36
Labour	Hefin Rees	856		
Conservative	Angela Clarke*	677	37.29	▼4.72
Conservative	Sally Roberts	585		
Liberal Democrats	Brian Gallagher	233	11.38	▲0.21
Liberal Democrats	Hassan Zaidi	152		
Registered electors		4,325		▲442
Turnout		1,791	41.41	▼8.68
Rejected ballots		10	0.56	▲0.46
Labour hold				
Labour gain from Conservative				

=== Sands End ===
Sands End (2)
Party	Candidate	Votes	%	±%
Labour	Brendan Bird*	933	52.37	▲1.29
Labour	Colin Pavelin	868		
Conservative	Mark Littlewood	642	37.34	▼1.81
Conservative	Grace Oliver	642		
Liberal Democrats	William Bagwell	177	10.29	▲0.52
Registered electors		5,202		▲625
Turnout		1,738	33.41	▼12.23
Rejected ballots		11	0.63	▲0.44
Labour hold				
Labour hold				

=== Sherbrooke ===
Sherbrooke (2)
Party	Candidate	Votes	%	±%
Labour	John Garrett*	706	44.09	▲0.45
Conservative	Tristram Harper	696	46.59	▲1.38
Conservative	Alexander Karmel	684		
Labour	Ashok Patel	600		
Liberal Democrats	Alistair Brett	138	9.32	▼1.83
Registered electors		3,858		▲456
Turnout		1,512	39.19	▼9.78
Rejected ballots		15	0.99	▲0.93
Labour hold				
Conservative hold				

=== Starch Green ===
Starch Green (2)
Party	Candidate	Votes	%	±%
Labour	Julian Hillman	1,010	56.86	▲3.00
Labour	Gregory Wilkinson	949		
Conservative	Richard Buxton	484	26.94	▼3.32
Conservative	Trevor Lloyd-Jones	444		
Liberal Democrats	Ruth Berry	279	16.20	▲0.31
Registered electors		4,266		▲207
Turnout		1,721	40.34	▼10.71
Rejected ballots		13	0.76	▲0.47
Labour hold				
Labour hold				

=== Sulivan ===
Sulivan (2)
Party	Candidate	Votes	%	±%
Conservative	Gerald Wombwell*	970	62.34	▲8.15
Conservative	Nicholas Botterill* (Note: Notterill was elected in a by-election triggered by the death of Cllr Jonathan Maiden in 1996)	967		
Labour	Vera Godden	467	28.23	▼6.15
Labour	Thomas Butler	410		
Liberal Democrats	Joan Bonser	167	9.43	▼2.00
Liberal Democrats	Allan McKelvie	126		
Registered electors		4,332		▲328
Turnout		1,645	37.97	▼11.88
Rejected ballots		7	0.43	▲0.23
Conservative hold				
Conservative hold				

=== Town ===
Town (2)
Party	Candidate	Votes	%	±%
Conservative	Stephen Greenhalgh* (Note: Greenhalgh was elected in a by-election triggered by the resignation of Cllr Antony Glover in 1995/96)	795	60.95	▲5.85
Conservative	Antony Lillis^{†} (Note: Lillis was a sitting Councillor representing the Colehill ward)	744		
Labour	Allison Bartlett	382	27.05	▼4.28
Labour	Joseph Moriah	301		
Liberal Democrats	Nathaniel Green	163	12.00	▼1.57
Liberal Democrats	Graham Muir	140		
Registered electors		4,802		▲487
Turnout		1,323	27.55	▼17.20
Rejected ballots		9	0.68	▲0.32
Conservative hold				
Conservative hold				

=== Walham ===
Walham (2)
Party	Candidate	Votes	%	±%
Conservative	Frances Stainton*	857	46.58	▼2.18
Labour	Jenny Vaughan	833	44.46	▲5.29
Conservative	Allen Mills	806		
Labour	Rory Vaughan	754		
Liberal Democrats	Anne Day	167	8.96	▼3.12
Liberal Democrats	Joseph Day	153		
Registered electors		5,539		▲553
Turnout		1,897	34.25	▼10.74
Rejected ballots		9	0.47	▲0.20
Conservative hold				
Labour gain from Conservative				

=== White City & Shepherds Bush ===
White City and Shepherds Bush (3)
Party	Candidate	Votes	%	±%
Labour	Ronald Browne*	1,362	78.17	▲6.21
Labour	Ivan Gibbons	1,305		
Labour	Jafar Khaled*	1,132		
Liberal Democrats	Michael Boudry	217	11.75	▼2.17
Liberal Democrats	Andrew Sweeting	200		
Conservative	Theresa Villiers	199	10.08	▼4.04
Conservative	Andrew Brierley	169		
Liberal Democrats	Timothy Leunig	154		
Conservative	James Bullock	122		
Registered electors		6,205		▼131
Turnout		1,884	30.36	▼10.77
Rejected ballots		25	1.33	▲1.06
Labour hold				
Labour hold				
Labour hold				

=== Wormholt ===
Wormholt (3)
Party	Candidate	Votes	%	±%
Labour	Colin Aherne*	1,053	67.27	▲4.93
Labour	Sally Powell*	995		
Labour	Stephen Burke*	982		
Conservative	Jonathon Collett	287	17.98	▼7.21
Conservative	Timothy Kevan	262		
Conservative	John Pickthorn	261		
Liberal Democrats	Natasha Julien	234	14.74	▲2.27
Liberal Democrats	Tanya Coen-D'Arcy	215		
Liberal Democrats	Christina Kearney	215		
Registered electors		5,934		▲231
Turnout		1,663	28.02	▼14.06
Rejected ballots		14	0.84	▲0.63
Labour hold				
Labour hold				
Labour hold				
