= Town (Hammersmith and Fulham ward) =

- Former electoral ward for the Hammersmith and Fulham London Borough Council
- Town ward boundaries between 2002 and 2022
- Borough: Hammersmith and Fulham
- County: Greater London
- Population: 11,201 (2011)
- Electorate: 7,859 (2018)

Former electoral ward
- Created: 1965
- Abolished: 2022
- Replaced by: Fulham Town, Walham Green
- GSS code: E05000264

Town was an electoral ward of the London Borough of Hammersmith and Fulham from 1965 to 2022. It was first used in the 1964 elections and last used for the 2018 elections. It returned councillors to Hammersmith and Fulham London Borough Council.

== 2002–2022 Hammersmith and Fulham council elections ==
There was a revision of ward boundaries in Hammersmith and Fulham in 2002.

=== 2018 election ===
The election took place on 3 May 2018.

2018 Hammersmith and Fulham London Borough Council election: Town (3)
Party	Candidate	Votes	%	±%
Conservative	Victoria Brocklebank-Fowler	1,567	48.0	−4.4
Conservative	Belinda Donovan	1,508	46.2	+0.1
Conservative	Andrew Brown	1,480	45.3	−5.5
Labour	Nick Buckley	1,354	41.5	+17.2
Labour	Helen Rowbottom	1,339	41.0	+17.1
Labour	James Doheny	1,255	38.4	+16.5
Liberal Democrats	Azi Ahmed	328	10.0	−10.1
Liberal Democrats	Henry Bagwell	328	10.0	−9.2
Liberal Democrats	Graham Muir	323	9.9	−4.7
Majority		126	3.8	
Turnout			41.70%	+9.4%
Conservative hold		Swing		
Conservative hold		Swing		
Conservative hold		Swing		

=== 2014 election ===
The election took place on 22 May 2014.

2014 Hammersmith and Fulham London Borough Council election: Town (3)
Party	Candidate	Votes	%	±%
Conservative	Greg Smith	1,342	52.4	+1.2
Conservative	Andrew Brown	1,301	50.8	−5.5
Conservative	Viya Nsumbu	1,181	46.1	−8.3
Labour	Nicholas Cobb	623	24.3	+3.8
Labour	Sara Ibrahim	611	23.9	+5.1
Labour	John Grigg	562	21.9	+4.0
Liberal Democrats	Paul Kennedy	516	20.1	−3.7
Liberal Democrats	Elizabeth Daly	492	19.2	−1.9
Liberal Democrats	Graham Muir	373	14.6	−4.3
TUSC	Joanne Harris	118	4.6	N/A
Majority		558	21.8	
Turnout			32.33	
Conservative hold		Swing		
Conservative hold		Swing		
Conservative hold		Swing		

=== 2010 election ===
The election on 6 May 2010 took place on the same day as the United Kingdom general election.

Town (3)
Party	Candidate	Votes	%	±%
Conservative	Oliver Craig	2,639	56.3	
Conservative	Stephen Greenhalgh	2,548	54.4	
Conservative	Greg Smith	2,399	51.2	
Liberal Democrats	Paul Kennedy	1,117	23.8	
Liberal Democrats	Henry Braund	989	21.1	
Labour	Ben Coleman	960	20.5	
Liberal Democrats	Graham Muir	886	18.9	
Labour	Oliver Cardigan	882	18.8	
Labour	Natalia Shepherd	837	17.9	
Turnout		4,688	61.0	
Conservative hold		Swing		
Conservative hold		Swing		
Conservative hold		Swing		

=== 2006 election ===
The election took place on 4 May 2006.

2006 Hammersmith and Fulham London Borough Council election: Town (3)
Party	Candidate	Votes	%	±%
Conservative	Stephen Greenhalgh	1,581	62.6	
Conservative	Greg Smith	1,570		
Conservative	Antony Lillis	1,554		
Labour	Anthony Cash	539	21.3	
Labour	Dominic Church	462		
Labour	Krokhukoomaj Kadoo	429		
Liberal Democrats	Henry Braund	406	16.1	
Liberal Democrats	Paul Kennedy	397		
Liberal Democrats	Graham Muir	368		
Turnout			35.1	
Conservative hold		Swing		
Conservative hold		Swing		
Conservative hold		Swing		

=== 2002 election ===
The election took place on 2 May 2002.

2002 Hammersmith and Fulham London Borough Council election: Town (3)
Party	Candidate	Votes	%	±%
Conservative	Greg Hands	1,161	60.3%	
Conservative	Stephen Greenhalgh	1,155		
Conservative	Antony Lillis	1,108		
Labour	Jeremy Fordham	519	27.0%	
Labour	Howard Dawber	468		
Labour	John Rham	396		
Liberal Democrats	Henry Braund	245	12.7%	
Liberal Democrats	Michael Cloney	242		
Liberal Democrats	Graham Muir	225		

== 1978–2002 Hammersmith and Fulham council elections ==
=== 1998 election ===
The election on 7 May 1998 took place on the same day as the 1998 Greater London Authority referendum.

1998 Hammersmith and Fulham London Borough Council election: Town (2)
Party	Candidate	Votes	%	±%
Conservative	Stephen Greenhalgh	795	60.95	▲5.85
Conservative	Antony Lillis	744		
Labour	Allison Bartlett	382	27.05	▼4.28
Labour	Joseph Moriah	301		
Liberal Democrats	Nathaniel Green	163	12.00	▼1.57
Liberal Democrats	Graham Muir	140		
Registered electors		4,802		▲487
Turnout		1,323	27.55	▼17.20
Rejected ballots		9	0.68	▲0.32
Conservative hold				
Conservative hold				
