= 2022 Hammersmith and Fulham London Borough Council election =

2022 local election in Hammersmith and Fulham

2022 Hammersmith and Fulham Council election
- 5 May 2022

All 50 council seats
| | First party | Second party |
|---|---|---|
| Leader | Stephen Cowan | Victoria Brocklebank-Fowler |
| Party | Labour | Conservative |
| Last election | 35 seats, 52.0% | 11 seats, 34.7% |
| Seats won | 40 | 10 |
| Seat change | ▲5 | ▼1 |
- Map of the results of the 2022 Hammersmith and Fulham council election. Conservatives in blue and Labour in red.
council control before election
Labour
Subsequent council control
TBD

The 2022 Hammersmith and Fulham London Borough Council election took place on 5 May 2022. All 50 members of Hammersmith and Fulham London Borough Council were elected. The elections took place alongside local elections in the other London boroughs and elections to local authorities across the United Kingdom.

The election took place under new election boundaries, which increased the number of councillors from 46 to 50. The Labour Party maintained control of the council, which it has held since 2014.

== Background ==
=== History ===
Result of the 2018 borough election

The thirty-two London boroughs were established in 1965 by the London Government Act 1963. They are the principal authorities in Greater London and have responsibilities including education, housing, planning, highways, social services, libraries, recreation, waste, environmental health and revenue collection. Some of the powers are shared with the Greater London Authority, which also manages passenger transport, police and fire.

Since its formation, Hammersmith and Fulham has been under Labour control, Conservative control or no overall control. The council has had a Labour majority since the 2014 election in which Labour won 26 seats to the Conservatives' 20. In the most recent election in 2018, Labour extended their majority to 35 seats with 52.0% of the vote, while the Conservatives won 11 seats with 34.7% of the vote. The Liberal Democrats received 11.2% of the vote across the borough but won no seats. The incumbent leader of the council is the Labour councillor Stephen Cowan, who has held that position since 2014.

=== Council term ===
In 2019, a Labour councillor for Fulham Broadway, Alan De'Ath, resigned as he had taken a politically restricted job. A by-election to replace him was held on 19 September 2019, which was won by the Labour candidate Helen Rowbottom, an NHS service manager. The Liberal Democrats saw a significant increase in their vote share for the seat. A Labour councillor for Wormholt and White City, Colin Aherne, died in July 2021. Aherne had served as a councillor for the area since 1986. A by-election for the ward was held in September 2021, which was won by the Labour candidate Frances Umeh, who worked as a communications professional.

== Electoral process ==
Hammersmith and Fulham, like other London borough councils, elects all of its councillors at once every four years. The previous election took place in 2018. The election took place by multi-member first-past-the-post voting, with each ward being represented by two or three councillors. Electors had as many votes as there are councillors to be elected in their ward, with the top two or three being elected.

All registered electors (British, Irish, Commonwealth and European Union citizens) living in London aged 18 or over were entitled to vote in the election. People who lived at two addresses in different councils, such as university students with different term-time and holiday addresses, were entitled to be registered for and vote in elections in both local authorities. Voting in-person at polling stations took place from 7:00 to 22:00 on election day, and voters were able to apply for postal votes or proxy votes in advance of the election.

== Previous council composition ==
Council composition after the 2018 election

| After 2018 election | | Before 2022 election | | After 2022 election | |
| Party | Seats | Party | Seats | Party | Seats |
|---|---|---|---|---|---|
| Labour | 35 | Labour | 35 | Labour | 40 |
| Conservative | 11 | Conservative | 11 | Conservative | 10 |

== Results summary ==
2022 Hammersmith and Fulham London Borough Council election
| Party | Seats | Gains | Losses | Net gain/loss | Seats % | Votes % | Votes | +/− |
|---|---|---|---|---|---|---|---|---|
| Labour | 40 | 0 | 0 | ▲5 | 80.0 | 57.1 | 55,996 | +2.8 |
| Conservative | 10 | 0 | 0 | ▼1 | 20.0 | 29.1 | 28,562 | -4.7 |
| Liberal Democrats | 0 | 0 | 0 | Steady | 0.0 | 10.6 | 10,399 | -0.6 |
| Green | 0 | 0 | 0 | Steady | 0.0 | 3.0 | 2,919 | +2.5 |
| Independent | 0 | 0 | 0 | Steady | 0.0 | 0.2 | 183 | +0.1 |
| SDP | 0 | 0 | 0 | Steady | 0.0 | 0.0 | 49 | N/A |

== Ward results ==
=== Addison ===
Addison (2)
| Party | Candidate | Votes | % | ±% |
|---|---|---|---|---|
| Labour | Jacolyn Daly | 1,291 | 75.8 | |
| Labour | Ross Melton | 1,195 | 70.1 | |
| Conservative | Letitia Davies | 276 | 16.2 | |
| Liberal Democrats | Janet Burden | 259 | 15.2 | |
| Conservative | Mark Loveday | 249 | 14.6 | |
| Turnout | | 1,704 | 30.7 | |
| Labour hold | | Swing | | |
| Labour hold | | Swing | | |

=== Avonmore ===
Avonmore (2)
| Party | Candidate | Votes | % | ±% |
|---|---|---|---|---|
| Labour | Laura Janes | 1,176 | 66.9 | |
| Labour | David Morton | 1,059 | 60.2 | |
| Conservative | Horatio Lovering | 430 | 24.4 | |
| Conservative | Hagir Ahmed | 412 | 23.4 | |
| Liberal Democrats | Eithne Buchanan-Barrow | 283 | 16.1 | |
| Turnout | | 1,759 | 33.8 | |
| Labour win (new seat) | | | | |
| Labour win (new seat) | | | | |

=== Brook Green ===
Brook Green (2)
| Party | Candidate | Votes | % | ±% |
|---|---|---|---|---|
| Labour | Stala Antoniades | 1,237 | 58.2 | |
| Labour | Adam Lang | 1,141 | 53.7 | |
| Conservative | Charlotte Duthie | 639 | 30.1 | |
| Conservative | Simon Hewitt | 625 | 29.4 | |
| Liberal Democrats | Dorothy Brooks | 275 | 12.9 | |
| Liberal Democrats | Niamh McCarthy | 253 | 11.9 | |
| Turnout | | 2,126 | 37.7 | |
| Labour win (new seat) | | | | |
| Labour win (new seat) | | | | |

=== College Park & Old Oak ===
College Park & Old Oak (3)
| Party | Candidate | Votes | % | ±% |
|---|---|---|---|---|
| Labour | Wesley Harcourt | 1,284 | 77.3 | |
| Labour | Alexandra Sanderson | 1,237 | 74.5 | |
| Labour | Bora Kwon | 1,194 | 71.9 | |
| Conservative | Jack Smith | 248 | 14.9 | |
| Conservative | Kieran Bergholcs | 247 | 14.9 | |
| Conservative | Alexander Nicholson | 247 | 14.9 | |
| Liberal Democrats | Molly McLoughlin | 235 | 14.1 | |
| Turnout | | 1,661 | 27.2 | |
| Labour hold | | | | |
| Labour hold | | | | |
| Labour win (new seat) | | | | |

=== Coningham ===
Coningham (3)
| Party | Candidate | Votes | % | ±% |
|---|---|---|---|---|
| Labour | Lisa Homan | 1,529 | 67.2 | |
| Labour | Rowan Ree | 1,305 | 57.3 | |
| Labour | Rory Vaughan | 1,247 | 54.8 | |
| Green | Colin Murphy | 531 | 23.3 | |
| Green | Amelia Walker | 459 | 20.2 | |
| Green | Benjamin Simms | 347 | 15.2 | |
| Conservative | Robert Iggulden | 302 | 13.3 | |
| Conservative | Lavente Kiss | 291 | 12.8 | |
| Conservative | Benjamin Ransom | 281 | 12.3 | |
| Liberal Democrats | Catherine Remy | 175 | 7.7 | |
| Liberal Democrats | David Miller | 153 | 6.7 | |
| Turnout | | 2,276 | 30.1 | |
| Labour win (new seat) | | | | |
| Labour win (new seat) | | | | |
| Labour win (new seat) | | | | |

=== Fulham Reach ===
Fulham Reach (3)
| Party | Candidate | Votes | % | ±% |
|---|---|---|---|---|
| Labour | Lucy Richardson | 1,983 | 69.0 | |
| Labour | Omid Miri | 1,756 | 61.1 | |
| Labour | Nikos Souslous | 1,717 | 59.8 | |
| Conservative | Elisabeth Beloten | 756 | 26.3 | |
| Conservative | James Windsor-Clive | 728 | 25.3 | |
| Conservative | Saif Lone | 653 | 22.7 | |
| Liberal Democrats | Jelena Sarmo | 395 | 13.8 | |
| Liberal Democrats | Rutger Wip | 292 | 10.2 | |
| Turnout | | 2,872 | 35.6 | |
| Labour hold | | | | |
| Labour hold | | | | |
| Labour hold | | | | |

=== Fulham Town ===
Fulham Town (2)
| Party | Candidate | Votes | % | ±% |
|---|---|---|---|---|
| Conservative | Victoria Brocklebank-Fowler | 817 | 46.7 | |
| Conservative | Andrew Dinsmore | 759 | 43.4 | |
| Liberal Democrats | Alison Hancock | 502 | 28.7 | |
| Labour | Sue Fennimore | 497 | 28.4 | |
| Labour | Juliet Thorpe | 450 | 25.7 | |
| Liberal Democrats | Roy Pounsford | 411 | 23.5 | |
| Turnout | | 1,750 | 34.0 | |
| Conservative win (new seat) | | | | |
| Conservative win (new seat) | | | | |

=== Grove ===
Grove (2)
| Party | Candidate | Votes | % | ±% |
|---|---|---|---|---|
| Labour | Stephen Cowan | 1,412 | 70.8 | |
| Labour | Helen Rowbottom | 1,372 | 68.8 | |
| Conservative | Oliver Briscoe | 360 | 18.1 | |
| Liberal Democrats | Megan Roper | 353 | 17.7 | |
| Conservative | Donald Johnson | 340 | 17.1 | |
| Turnout | | 1,994 | 38.5 | |
| Labour win (new seat) | | | | |
| Labour win (new seat) | | | | |

=== Hammersmith Broadway ===
Hammersmith Broadway (2)
| Party | Candidate | Votes | % | ±% |
|---|---|---|---|---|
| Labour | Emma Apthorp | 1,198 | 74.1 | |
| Labour | Patricia Quigley | 1,108 | 68.6 | |
| Conservative | Nick Mason | 314 | 19.4 | |
| Conservative | David Rogers | 258 | 16.0 | |
| Liberal Democrats | Dennis Martin | 161 | 10.0 | |
| Liberal Democrats | Meher Oliaji | 134 | 8.3 | |
| Turnout | | 1,616 | 31.4 | |
| Labour hold | | | | |
| Labour hold | | | | |

=== Lillie ===
Lillie (2)
| Party | Candidate | Votes | % | ±% |
|---|---|---|---|---|
| Labour | Ben Coleman | 903 | 63.2 | |
| Labour | Sharon Holder | 848 | 59.3 | |
| Conservative | Emily Maister | 368 | 25.8 | |
| Conservative | Jemima Tate | 329 | 23.0 | |
| Liberal Democrats | Elena Brooke-Edwards | 165 | 11.5 | |
| Liberal Democrats | Anthony Bicknell | 145 | 10.1 | |
| Turnout | | 1,429 | 30.2 | |
| Labour win (new seat) | | | | |
| Labour win (new seat) | | | | |

=== Munster ===
Munster (3)
| Party | Candidate | Votes | % | ±% |
|---|---|---|---|---|
| Conservative | Alex Karmel | 1,169 | 41.5 | |
| Conservative | Adronie Alford | 1,164 | 41.4 | |
| Conservative | Dominic Stanton | 1,113 | 39.6 | |
| Labour | Shirley Cupit | 899 | 31.9 | |
| Labour | Lydia Paynter | 863 | 30.7 | |
| Labour | Reber Kamaran | 831 | 29.5 | |
| Liberal Democrats | Nicola Horlick | 734 | 26.1 | |
| Liberal Democrats | Ted Townsend | 706 | 25.1 | |
| Liberal Democrats | Jon Burden | 655 | 23.3 | |
| Turnout | | 2,814 | 33.8 | |
| Conservative hold | | | | |
| Conservative hold | | | | |
| Conservative hold | | | | |

=== Palace & Hurlingham ===
Palace & Hurlingham (3)
| Party | Candidate | Votes | % | ±% |
|---|---|---|---|---|
| Conservative | Amanda Lloyd-Harris | 1,774 | 56.3 | |
| Conservative | Jackie Borland | 1,711 | 54.3 | |
| Conservative | Aliya Afzal-Khan | 1,682 | 53.4 | |
| Labour | Caroline Needham | 952 | 30.2 | |
| Labour | Jonathan Caleb-Landy | 812 | 25.8 | |
| Labour | Guy Vincent | 729 | 23.1 | |
| Liberal Democrats | Tamara Dragadze | 574 | 18.2 | |
| Green | Nida Al-Fulaij | 540 | 17.1 | |
| Independent | Alex Horn | 183 | 5.8 | |
| Turnout | | 3,150 | 38.7 | |
| Conservative win (new seat) | | | | |
| Conservative win (new seat) | | | | |
| Conservative win (new seat) | | | | |

=== Parsons Green & Sandford ===
Parsons Green & Sandford (2)
| Party | Candidate | Votes | % | ±% |
|---|---|---|---|---|
| Conservative | Jose Afonso | 935 | 54.3 | |
| Conservative | Adrian Pascu-Tulbure | 922 | 53.6 | |
| Labour | Christabel Cooper | 522 | 30.3 | |
| Labour | John Grigg | 468 | 27.2 | |
| Liberal Democrats | Graham Muir | 267 | 15.5 | |
| Liberal Democrats | Benedict Nightingale | 263 | 15.3 | |
| Turnout | | 1,721 | 32.0 | |
| Conservative win (new seat) | | | | |
| Conservative win (new seat) | | | | |

=== Ravenscourt ===
Ravenscourt (2)
| Party | Candidate | Votes | % | ±% |
|---|---|---|---|---|
| Labour | Liz Collins | 1,262 | 60.1 | |
| Labour | Patrick Walsh | 1,088 | 51.8 | |
| Conservative | Hugo Fitzgerald | 515 | 24.5 | |
| Conservative | Mark Higton | 497 | 23.7 | |
| Green | Aileen-Ann Gonsalves | 277 | 13.2 | |
| Liberal Democrats | Henrietta Bewley | 275 | 13.1 | |
| Liberal Democrats | Michael Cook | 200 | 9.5 | |
| Turnout | | 2,101 | 42.9 | |
| Labour win (new seat) | | | | |
| Labour win (new seat) | | | | |

=== Sands End ===
Sands End (3)
| Party | Candidate | Votes | % | ±% |
|---|---|---|---|---|
| Labour | Paul Alexander | 1,199 | 50.5 | |
| Labour | Ann Rosenberg | 1,177 | 49.6 | |
| Labour | Ashok Patel | 1,098 | 46.3 | |
| Conservative | Constance Campbell | 970 | 40.9 | |
| Conservative | Liam Downer-Sanderson | 912 | 38.4 | |
| Conservative | Stewart Waine | 869 | 36.6 | |
| Liberal Democrats | Ray Burnet | 297 | 12.5 | |
| Liberal Democrats | Gerald Milch | 203 | 8.6 | |
| Turnout | | 2,374 | 32.4 | |
| Labour hold | | | | |
| Labour hold | | | | |
| Labour hold | | | | |

=== Shepherd's Bush Green ===
Shepherd's Bush Green (2)
| Party | Candidate | Votes | % | ±% |
|---|---|---|---|---|
| Labour | Mercy Umeh | 784 | 72.8 | |
| Labour | Zarar Qayyum | 781 | 72.5 | |
| Liberal Democrats | Paul Buchanan-Barrow | 170 | 15.8 | |
| Conservative | Al Lewis | 165 | 15.3 | |
| Conservative | Christian Vinante | 151 | 14.0 | |
| Turnout | | 1,077 | 28.3 | |
| Labour hold | | | | |
| Labour hold | | | | |

=== Walham Green ===
Walham Green (2)
| Party | Candidate | Votes | % | ±% |
|---|---|---|---|---|
| Labour | Trey Campbell-Simon | 907 | 55.1 | |
| Labour | Genevieve Nwaogbe | 860 | 52.2 | |
| Conservative | Richard Cubitt | 458 | 27.8 | |
| Conservative | Jamie Monteith-Mann | 429 | 26.1 | |
| Liberal Democrats | Rosie McDonagh | 185 | 11.2 | |
| Green | Robert Owen | 172 | 10.4 | |
| Liberal Democrats | William Bagwell | 156 | 9.5 | |
| Turnout | | 1,646 | 31.9 | |
| Labour win (new seat) | | | | |
| Labour win (new seat) | | | | |

=== Wendell Park ===
Wendell Park (2)
| Party | Candidate | Votes | % | ±% |
|---|---|---|---|---|
| Labour | Rebecca Harvey | 1,511 | 70.3 | |
| Labour | Asif Siddique | 1,305 | 60.7 | |
| Conservative | Alistair Milmore | 462 | 21.5 | |
| Conservative | Jack Perschke | 429 | 20.0 | |
| Liberal Democrats | Amelia Gaughan | 396 | 18.4 | |
| Turnout | | 2,149 | 40.9 | |
| Labour win (new seat) | | | | |
| Labour win (new seat) | | | | |

=== West Kensington ===
West Kensington (3)
| Party | Candidate | Votes | % | ±% |
|---|---|---|---|---|
| Labour | Daryl Brown | 1,280 | 65.1 | |
| Labour | Sally Taylor | 1,270 | 64.6 | |
| Labour | Florian Chevoppe-Verdier | 1,213 | 61.7 | |
| Conservative | Sophie Richards | 439 | 22.3 | |
| Conservative | Yasantha Monerawela | 380 | 19.3 | |
| Conservative | Dragi Temkov | 364 | 18.5 | |
| Liberal Democrats | Gill Barnes | 289 | 14.7 | |
| Liberal Democrats | Sarah Taylor | 261 | 13.3 | |
| Liberal Democrats | Philip Barton | 197 | 10.0 | |
| SDP | Simon Marshall | 49 | 2.5 | |
| Turnout | | 1,966 | 30.2 | |
| Labour win (new seat) | | | | |
| Labour win (new seat) | | | | |
| Labour win (new seat) | | | | |

=== White City ===
White City (3)
| Party | Candidate | Votes | % | ±% |
|---|---|---|---|---|
| Labour | Andrew Jones | 1,396 | 74.0 | |
| Labour | Natalia Perez | 1,388 | 73.6 | |
| Labour | Frances Umeh | 1,262 | 66.9 | |
| Green | David Kelly | 346 | 18.3 | |
| Conservative | Sada Farah | 239 | 12.7 | |
| Liberal Democrats | Felix Brett | 224 | 11.9 | |
| Conservative | Nasir Jamal | 197 | 10.4 | |
| Conservative | Zara Mahmood | 197 | 10.4 | |
| Turnout | | 1,887 | 27.5 | |
| Labour win (new seat) | | | | |
| Labour win (new seat) | | | | |
| Labour win (new seat) | | | | |

=== Wormholt ===
Wormholt (2)
| Party | Candidate | Votes | % | ±% |
|---|---|---|---|---|
| Labour | Maxwell Schmid | 1,010 | 67.0 | |
| Labour | Nicole Trehy | 990 | 65.7 | |
| Conservative | Steve Lyons | 250 | 16.6 | |
| Green | Emma Byrne | 247 | 16.4 | |
| Conservative | Fatima Bajwa | 240 | 15.9 | |
| Liberal Democrats | Michael Illingworth | 156 | 10.4 | |
| Turnout | | 1,507 | 29.9 | |
| Labour win (new seat) | | | | |
| Labour win (new seat) | | | | |

== Changes 2022-2026 ==
=== Affiliation changes ===
On 22 July 2025 it was announced that two Labour councillors, Liz Collins (Ravenscourt) and Trey Campbell-Simon (Walham Green), had defected to the Green Party.

In July 2023 an elected Labour councillor, David Morton (Avonmore), resigned his membership to sit as an independent.

=== By-elections ===
==== Hammersmith Broadway ====
Hammersmith Broadway by-election: 20 February 2025
| Party | Candidate | Votes | % | ±% |
|---|---|---|---|---|
| Labour | Callum Nimmo | 578 | 53.4 | ▼18.2 |
| Reform | Anthony Goodwin | 148 | 13.7 | N/A |
| Conservative | Nora Farah | 144 | 13.3 | ▼5.5 |
| Liberal Democrats | Meerav Shah | 135 | 12.5 | ▲2.9 |
| Green | Colin Murphy | 77 | 7.1 | N/A |
| Majority | | 430 | 39.7 | N/A |
| Turnout | | 1,082 | | |
| Labour hold | | | | |

==== Lillie ====
Lillie by-election: 20 February 2025
| Party | Candidate | Votes | % | ±% |
|---|---|---|---|---|
| Labour | Lydia Paynter | 466 | 40.4 | ▼22.5 |
| Conservative | Matt Sinclair | 352 | 30.5 | ▲4.9 |
| Liberal Democrats | Conor Campbell | 212 | 18.4 | ▲6.9 |
| Reform | Peter Hunter | 123 | 10.7 | N/A |
| Majority | | 114 | 9.9 | N/A |
| Turnout | | 1,153 | | |
| Labour hold | | Swing | ▼13.7 | |

==== Fulham Town ====
Fulham Town by-election: 3 July 2025
| Party | Candidate | Votes | % | ±% |
|---|---|---|---|---|
| Conservative | Liam Downer-Sanderson | 647 | 43.3 | ▼2.5 |
| Liberal Democrats | Roy Pounsford | 345 | 23.1 | ▼3.5 |
| Labour | Sam Kelly | 251 | 16.8 | ▼10.7 |
| Reform | Chris Clowes | 187 | 12.5 | N/A |
| Green | Aidan Chisholm | 63 | 4.2 | N/A |
| Majority | | 302 | 20.2 | N/A |
| Turnout | | 1,499 | | |
| Conservative hold | | | | |
