= Hammersmith Broadway (ward) =

- Electoral ward for the Hammersmith and Fulham London Borough Council
- Hammersmith Broadway ward boundaries since 2022
- Borough: Hammersmith and Fulham
- County: Greater London
- Population: 7,850 (2021) (Note: 2021 Census data reported for 2022 ward boundaries)
- Electorate: 5,169 (2022)
- Area: 0.6571 square kilometres (0.2537 sq mi)

Current electoral ward
- Created: 2002
- Number of members: 2002–2022: 3; 2022–present: 2
- Councillors: Vacancy; Callum Nimmo
- GSS code: E05013741 (2022–present)

Hammersmith Broadway is an electoral ward in the London Borough of Hammersmith and Fulham. The ward was first used in the 2002 elections. It returns councillors to Hammersmith and Fulham London Borough Council.

== Hammersmith and Fulham council elections since 2022 ==
=== 2026 election ===
Patricia Quigley resigned in November 2025, with the by-election deferred until May 2026. (Note: Casual vacancies occurring within six months of scheduled elections are not filled.)

=== 2025 by-election ===
The by-election took place on 20 February 2025, following the resignation of Emma Apthorp. It was held on the same day as the 2025 Lillie by-election.

2025 Hammersmith Broadway by-election
Party	Candidate	Votes	%	±%
Labour	Callum Nimmo	578		
Reform	Anthony Goodwin	148		
Conservative	Nora Farah	144		
Liberal Democrats	Meerav Shah	135		
Green	Colin Murphy	77		
Turnout			21.23	
Labour hold		Swing		

=== 2022 election ===
The election took place on 5 May 2022.

2022 Hammersmith and Fulham London Borough Council election: Hammersmith Broadway
Party	Candidate	Votes	%	±%
Labour	Emma Apthorp	1,198	74.1	
Labour	Patricia Quigley	1,108	68.6	
Conservative	Nick Mason	314	19.4	
Conservative	David Rogers	258	16.0	
Liberal Democrats	Dennis Martin	161	10.0	
Liberal Democrats	Meher Oliaji	134	8.3	
Turnout		1,616	31.4	
Labour win (new boundaries)				
Labour win (new boundaries)				
