= White City (ward) =

Electoral ward in London, England

- Electoral ward for the Hammersmith and Fulham London Borough Council
- Borough: Hammersmith and Fulham
- County: Greater London
- Population: 10,393 (2021)
- Major settlements: White City, London
- Area: 0.6863 km²

Current electoral ward
- Created: 2022
- Councillors: 3

White City is an electoral ward in the London Borough of Hammersmith and Fulham. The ward was first used in the 2022 elections and elects three councillors to Hammersmith and Fulham London Borough Council.

== Geography ==
The ward is named after the area of White City.

== Councillors ==
Election	Councillors		
2022	Andrew Jones (Labour)	Natalia Perez (Labour)	Frances Umeh (Labour)

== Elections ==
=== 2022 ===
White City (3)
Party	Candidate	Votes	%	±%
Labour	Andrew Jones	1,396	74.0	
Labour	Natalia Perez	1,388	73.6	
Labour	Frances Umeh	1,262	66.9	
Green	David Kelly	346	18.3	
Conservative	Sada Farah	239	12.7	
Liberal Democrats	Felix Brett	224	11.9	
Conservative	Nasir Jamal	197	10.4	
Conservative	Zara Mahmood	197	10.4	
Turnout		1,887	27.5	
Labour win (new seat)				
Labour win (new seat)				
Labour win (new seat)				

== See also ==
- List of electoral wards in Greater London
