= Fulham Reach (ward) =

Electoral ward in London, England

- Electoral ward for the Hammersmith and Fulham London Borough Council
- Borough: Hammersmith and Fulham
- County: Greater London
- Population: 12,167 (2021)
- Area: 0.8360 km²

Current electoral ward
- Created: 2002
- Councillors: 3

Fulham Reach is an electoral ward in the London Borough of Hammersmith and Fulham. The ward was first used in the 2002 elections and elects three councillors to Hammersmith and Fulham London Borough Council.

== Geography ==
The ward is named after the area of Fulham Reach.

== Councillors ==
Election	Councillors		
2022	Omid Miri (Labour)	Lucy Richardson (Labour)	Nikos Souslous (Labour)

== Elections ==
=== 2022 ===
Fulham Reach (3)
Party	Candidate	Votes	%	±%
Labour	Lucy Richardson	1,983	69.0	
Labour	Omid Miri	1,756	61.1	
Labour	Nikos Souslous	1,717	59.8	
Conservative	Elisabeth Beloten	756	26.3	
Conservative	James Windsor-Clive	728	25.3	
Conservative	Saif Lone	653	22.7	
Liberal Democrats	Jelena Sarmo	395	13.8	
Liberal Democrats	Rutger Wip	292	10.2	
Turnout		2,872	35.6	
Labour hold				
Labour hold				
Labour hold				

== See also ==
- List of electoral wards in Greater London
