= Parsons Green and Sandford =

Electoral ward in London, England

- Electoral ward for the Hammersmith and Fulham London Borough Council
- Borough: Hammersmith and Fulham
- County: Greater London
- Population: 7,728 (2021)
- Area: 0.6406 km²

Current electoral ward
- Created: 2022
- Councillors: 2

Parsons Green and Sandford is an electoral ward in the London Borough of Hammersmith and Fulham. The ward was first used in the 2022 elections and elects two councillors to Hammersmith and Fulham London Borough Council.

== Geography ==
The ward is named after the areas of Parsons Green and Sandford.

== Councillors ==
| Election | Councillors | |
|---|---|---|
| 2022 | Jose Afonso (Conservative) | Adrian Pascu-Tulbure (Conservative) |

== Elections ==
=== 2022 ===
Parsons Green & Sandford (2)
| Party | Candidate | Votes | % | ±% |
|---|---|---|---|---|
| Conservative | Jose Afonso | 935 | 54.3 | |
| Conservative | Adrian Pascu-Tulbure | 922 | 53.6 | |
| Labour | Christabel Cooper | 522 | 30.3 | |
| Labour | John Grigg | 468 | 27.2 | |
| Liberal Democrats | Graham Muir | 267 | 15.5 | |
| Liberal Democrats | Benedict Nightingale | 263 | 15.3 | |
| Turnout | | 1,721 | 32.0 | |
| Conservative win (new seat) | | | | |
| Conservative win (new seat) | | | | |

== See also ==
- List of electoral wards in Greater London
