= Wendell Park (ward) =

Electoral ward in London, England

- Electoral ward for the Hammersmith and Fulham London Borough Council
- Borough: Hammersmith and Fulham
- County: Greater London
- Population: 7,419 (2021)
- Area: 0.5847 km²

Current electoral ward
- Created: 2022
- Councillors: 2

Wendell Park is an electoral ward in the London Borough of Hammersmith and Fulham. The ward was first used in the 2022 elections and elects two councillors to Hammersmith and Fulham London Borough Council.

== Geography ==
The ward is named after the area of Wendell Park.

== Councillors ==
Election	Councillors	
2022	Rebecca Harvey (Labour)	Asif Siddique (Labour)

== Elections ==
=== 2022 ===
Wendell Park (2)
Party	Candidate	Votes	%	±%
Labour	Rebecca Harvey	1,511	70.3	
Labour	Asif Siddique	1,305	60.7	
Conservative	Alistair Milmore	462	21.5	
Conservative	Jack Perschke	429	20.0	
Liberal Democrats	Amelia Gaughan	396	18.4	
Turnout		2,149	40.9	
Labour win (new seat)				
Labour win (new seat)				

== See also ==
- List of electoral wards in Greater London
