= Munster (ward) =

Electoral ward in London, England

- Electoral ward for the Hammersmith and Fulham London Borough Council
- Borough: Hammersmith and Fulham
- County: Greater London
- Population: 12,137 (2021)
- Area: 0.7096 km²

Current electoral ward
- Created: 2002
- Councillors: 3

Munster is an electoral ward in the London Borough of Hammersmith and Fulham. The ward was first used in the 2002 elections and elects three councillors to Hammersmith and Fulham London Borough Council.

== Geography ==
The ward is named after the area of Munster.

== Councillors ==
Election	Councillors		
2022	Alex Karmel (Conservative)	Adronie Alford (Conservative)	Dominic Stanton (Conservative)

== Elections ==
=== 2022 ===
Munster (3)
Party	Candidate	Votes	%	±%
Conservative	Alex Karmel	1,169	41.5	
Conservative	Adronie Alford	1,164	41.4	
Conservative	Dominic Stanton	1,113	39.6	
Labour	Shirley Cupit	899	31.9	
Labour	Lydia Paynter	863	30.7	
Labour	Reber Kamaran	831	29.5	
Liberal Democrats	Nicola Horlick	734	26.1	
Liberal Democrats	Ted Townsend	706	25.1	
Liberal Democrats	Jon Burden	655	23.3	
Turnout		2,814	33.8	
Conservative hold				
Conservative hold				
Conservative hold				

== See also ==
- List of electoral wards in Greater London
