= Shepherd's Bush Green (ward) =

Electoral ward in London, England

- Electoral ward for the Hammersmith and Fulham London Borough Council
- Borough: Hammersmith and Fulham
- County: Greater London
- Population: 5,570 (2021)
- Area: 0.5245 km²

Current electoral ward
- Created: 2002
- Councillors: 2 (since 2022); 3 (2002-2022)

Shepherd's Bush Green is an electoral ward in the London Borough of Hammersmith and Fulham. The ward was first used in the 2002 elections and elects two councillors to Hammersmith and Fulham London Borough Council.

== Geography ==
The ward is named after the area of Shepherd's Bush Green.

== Councillors ==
Election	Councillors	
2022	Mercy Umeh (Labour)	Zarar Qayyum (Labour)

== Elections ==
=== 2022 ===
Shepherd's Bush Green (2)
Party	Candidate	Votes	%	±%
Labour	Mercy Umeh	784	72.8	
Labour	Zarar Qayyum	781	72.5	
Liberal Democrats	Paul Buchanan-Barrow	170	15.8	
Conservative	Al Lewis	165	15.3	
Conservative	Christian Vinante	151	14.0	
Turnout		1,077	28.3	
Labour hold				
Labour hold				

== See also ==
- List of electoral wards in Greater London
