= Lillie (ward) =

- Electoral ward for the Hammersmith and Fulham London Borough Council
- Lillie ward boundaries since 2022
- Borough: Hammersmith and Fulham
- County: Greater London
- Population: 6,711 (2021) (Note: 2021 Census data reported for 2022 ward boundaries)
- Electorate: 4,748 (2022)
- Area: 0.4048 square kilometres (0.1563 sq mi)

Current electoral ward
- Created: 2022
- Number of members: 2
- Councillors: Sharon Holder; Lydia Paynter
- GSS code: E05013742

Lillie is an electoral ward in the London Borough of Hammersmith and Fulham. The ward was first used in the 2022 elections. It returns councillors to Hammersmith and Fulham London Borough Council.

== List of councillors ==
Seat	Councillor	Took office	Left office	Party	Election
1	Ben Coleman	2022	2025	Labour	2022
2	Sharon Holder	2022	Incumbent	Labour	2022
1	Lydia Paynter	2025	Incumbent	Labour	2025

== Hammersmith and Fulham council elections ==
=== 2025 by-election ===
The by-election took place on 20 February 2025, following the resignation of Ben Coleman. It was held on the same day as the 2025 Hammersmith Broadway by-election.

2025 Lillie by-election
Party	Candidate	Votes	%	±%
Labour	Lydia Paynter	466	40.2	−23.0
Conservative	Matt Sinclair	352	30.4	+4.6
Liberal Democrats	Conor Campbell	212	18.3	+6.8
Reform	Peter Hunter	123	10.6	+10.6
Turnout		1,158	24.0	−6.2
Labour hold		Swing	-13.8	

The total number of rejected ballot papers was 5.

=== 2022 election ===
The election took place on 5 May 2022.

2022 Hammersmith and Fulham London Borough Council election: Lillie
Party	Candidate	Votes	%	±%
Labour	Ben Coleman	903	63.2	
Labour	Sharon Holder	848	59.3	
Conservative	Emily Maister	368	25.8	
Conservative	Jemima Tate	329	23.0	
Liberal Democrats	Elena Brooke-Edwards	165	11.5	
Liberal Democrats	Anthony Bicknell	145	10.1	
Turnout		1,429	30.2	
Labour win (new seat)				
Labour win (new seat)				
