= Palace and Hurlingham =

Electoral ward in London, England

- Electoral ward for the Hammersmith and Fulham London Borough Council
- Borough: Hammersmith and Fulham
- County: Greater London
- Population: 11,173 (2021)
- Area: 1.558 km²

Current electoral ward
- Created: 2022
- Councillors: 3

Palace and Hurlingham is an electoral ward in the London Borough of Hammersmith and Fulham. The ward was first used in the 2022 elections and elects three councillors to Hammersmith and Fulham London Borough Council.

== Geography ==
The ward is named after Fulham Palace and Hurlingham.

== Councillors ==
Election	Councillors		
2022	Amanda Lloyd-Harris (Conservative)	Jackie Borland (Conservative)	Aliya Afzal-Khan (Conservative)

== Elections ==
=== 2022 ===
Palace & Hurlingham (3)
Party	Candidate	Votes	%	±%
Conservative	Amanda Lloyd-Harris	1,774	56.3	
Conservative	Jackie Borland	1,711	54.3	
Conservative	Aliya Afzal-Khan	1,682	53.4	
Labour	Caroline Needham	952	30.2	
Labour	Jonathan Caleb-Landy	812	25.8	
Labour	Guy Vincent	729	23.1	
Liberal Democrats	Tamara Dragadze	574	18.2	
Green	Nida Al-Fulaij	540	17.1	
Independent	Alex Horn	183	5.8	
Turnout		3,150	38.7	
Conservative win (new seat)				
Conservative win (new seat)				
Conservative win (new seat)				

== See also ==
- List of electoral wards in Greater London
