= West Kensington (ward) =

Electoral ward in London, England

- Electoral ward for the Hammersmith and Fulham London Borough Council
- Borough: Hammersmith and Fulham
- County: Greater London
- Population: 9,308 (2021)
- Major settlements: West Kensington
- Area: 0.5475 km²

Current electoral ward
- Created: 2022
- Councillors: 3

West Kensington is an electoral ward in the London Borough of Hammersmith and Fulham. The ward was first used in the 2022 elections and elects three councillors to Hammersmith and Fulham London Borough Council.

== Geography ==
The ward is named after the area of West Kensington.

== Councillors ==
Election	Councillors		
2022	Daryl Brown (Labour)	Florian Chevoppe-Verdier (Labour)	Sally Taylor (Labour)

== Elections ==
=== 2022 ===
West Kensington (3)
Party	Candidate	Votes	%	±%
Labour	Daryl Brown	1,280	65.1	
Labour	Sally Taylor	1,270	64.6	
Labour	Florian Chevoppe-Verdier	1,213	61.7	
Conservative	Sophie Richards	439	22.3	
Conservative	Yasantha Monerawela	380	19.3	
Conservative	Dragi Temkov	364	18.5	
Liberal Democrats	Gill Barnes	289	14.7	
Liberal Democrats	Sarah Taylor	261	13.3	
Liberal Democrats	Philip Barton	197	10.0	
SDP	Simon Marshall	49	2.5	
Turnout		1,966	30.2	
Labour win (new seat)				
Labour win (new seat)				
Labour win (new seat)				

== See also ==
- List of electoral wards in Greater London
