= Walham Green (ward) =

- Electoral ward for the Hammersmith and Fulham London Borough Council
- FWalham Green ward boundaries since 2022
- Borough: Hammersmith and Fulham
- County: Greater London
- Population: 7,951 (2021) (Note: 2021 Census data reported for 2022 ward boundaries)
- Electorate: 5,190 (2022)
- Area: 0.5186 square kilometres (0.2002 sq mi)

Current electoral ward
- Created: 2022
- Number of members: 2
- Councillors: Trey Campbell-Simon; Genevieve Nwaogbe
- GSS code: E05013749 (2022–present)

Walham Green is an electoral ward in the London Borough of Hammersmith and Fulham. The ward was first used in the 2022 elections. It returns two councillors to Hammersmith and Fulham London Borough Council.

== List of councillors ==
Term	Councillor	Party
2022–present	Trey Campbell-Simon (Note: Trey Campbell-Simon changed parties in 2025.)	Labour
2022–present	Trey Campbell-Simon	Green
2022–present	Genevieve Nwaogbe	Labour

== Hammersmith and Fulham council elections ==
=== 2022 election ===
The election took place on 5 May 2022.

2022 Hammersmith and Fulham London Borough Council election: Walham Green (2)
Party	Candidate	Votes	%	±%
Labour	Trey Campbell-Simon	907	55.1	
Labour	Genevieve Nwaogbe	860	52.2	
Conservative	Richard Cubitt	458	27.8	
Conservative	Jamie Monteith-Mann	429	26.1	
Liberal Democrats	Rosie McDonagh	185	11.2	
Green	Robert Owen	172	10.4	
Liberal Democrats	William Bagwell	156	9.5	
Turnout		1,646	31.9	
Labour win (new seat)				
Labour win (new seat)				
