= Fulham Town =

- Electoral ward for the Hammersmith and Fulham London Borough Council
- Fulham Town ward boundaries since 2022
- Borough: Hammersmith and Fulham
- County: Greater London
- Population: 7,391 (2021) (Note: 2021 Census data reported for 2022 ward boundaries)
- Electorate: 5,187 (2022)
- Area: 0.4507 square kilometres (0.1740 sq mi)

Current electoral ward
- Created: 2022
- Number of members: 2
- Councillors: Victoria Brocklebank-Fowler; Liam Downer-Sanderson
- GSS code: E05013739 (2022–present)

Fulham Town is an electoral ward in the London Borough of Hammersmith and Fulham. The ward was first used in the 2022 elections. It returns two councillors to Hammersmith and Fulham London Borough Council.

== List of councillors ==
Term	Councillor	Party
2022–present	Victoria Brocklebank-Fowler	Conservative
2022–2025	Andrew Dinsmore	Conservative
2025–present	Liam Downer-Sanderson	Conservative

== Hammersmith and Fulham council elections ==
=== 2025 by-election ===
The by-election took place on 3 July 2025, following the resignation of Andrew Dinsmore.

2025 Fulham Town by-election
Party	Candidate	Votes	%	±%
Conservative	Liam Downer-Sanderson	647	43.3	
Liberal Democrats	Roy Pounsford	345	23.1	
Labour	Sam Kelly	251	16.8	
Reform	Chris Clowes	187	12.5	
Green	Aidan Chisholm	63	4.2	
Turnout				
Conservative hold		Swing		

=== 2022 election ===
The election took place on 5 May 2022.

2022 Hammersmith and Fulham London Borough Council election: Fulham Town (2)
Party	Candidate	Votes	%	±%
Conservative	Victoria Brocklebank-Fowler	817	46.7	
Conservative	Andrew Dinsmore	759	43.4	
Liberal Democrats	Alison Hancock	502	28.7	
Labour	Sue Fennimore	497	28.4	
Labour	Juliet Thorpe	450	25.7	
Liberal Democrats	Roy Pounsford	411	23.5	
Turnout		1,750	34.0	
Conservative win (new seat)				
Conservative win (new seat)				
