= Wormholt =

Electoral ward in London, England

- Electoral ward for the Hammersmith and Fulham London Borough Council
- Borough: Hammersmith and Fulham
- County: Greater London
- Population: 7,985 (2021)
- Area: 0.6336 km²

Current electoral ward
- Created: 2022
- Councillors: 2
- Created from: Wormholt and White City

Wormholt is an electoral ward in the London Borough of Hammersmith and Fulham. The ward was first used in the 2022 elections and elects two councillors to Hammersmith and Fulham London Borough Council.

== Geography ==
The ward is named after the area of Wormholt Park.

== Councillors ==
Election	Councillors	
2022	Maxwell Schmid (Labour)	Nicole Trehy (Labour)

== Elections ==
=== 2022 ===
Wormholt (2)
Party	Candidate	Votes	%	±%
Labour	Maxwell Schmid	1,010	67.0	
Labour	Nicole Trehy	990	65.7	
Conservative	Steve Lyons	250	16.6	
Green	Emma Byrne	247	16.4	
Conservative	Fatima Bajwa	240	15.9	
Liberal Democrats	Michael Illingworth	156	10.4	
Turnout		1,507	29.9	
Labour win (new seat)				
Labour win (new seat)				

== See also ==
- List of electoral wards in Greater London
