= Avonmore (ward) =

Electoral ward in London, England

- Electoral ward for the Hammersmith and Fulham London Borough Council
- Borough: Hammersmith and Fulham
- County: Greater London
- Population: 7,530 (2021)
- Area: 0.5754 km²

Current electoral ward
- Created: 2022, 1965
- Councillors: 2

Avonmore is an electoral ward in the London Borough of Hammersmith and Fulham. The ward in its current form was first used in the 2022 elections and elects two councillors to Hammersmith and Fulham London Borough Council. It was previously in use from 1964 to 2002.

== Geography ==
The ward is named after the Avonmore area.

== Councillors ==
Election	Councillors	
2022	Laura Janes (Labour)	David Morton (Labour) (Independent since 2023)

== Elections ==
=== 2022 ===
Avonmore (2)
Party	Candidate	Votes	%	±%
Labour	Laura Janes	1,176	66.9	
Labour	David Morton	1,059	60.2	
Conservative	Horatio Lovering	430	24.4	
Conservative	Hagir Ahmed	412	23.4	
Liberal Democrats	Eithne Buchanan-Barrow	283	16.1	
Turnout		1,759	33.8	
Labour win (new seat)				
Labour win (new seat)				

== See also ==
- List of electoral wards in Greater London
