= Hammersmith and Fulham London Borough Council =

Local authority in London, England

- Coat of arms

- Logo

Type
- Type: London borough

Leadership
- Mayor: Sharon Holder, Labour since 21 May 2025
- Leader: Stephen Cowan, Labour since 22 May 2014
- Chief Executive: Sharon Lea since 24 February 2022

Structure
- Seats: 50 councillors
- Political groups: Administration (38) Labour (38) Opposition (12) Conservative (12)
- Length of term: Whole council elected every four years

Elections
- Voting system: Plurality at-large (FPTP)
- Last election: 7 May 2026
- Next election: 2 May 2030

Meeting place
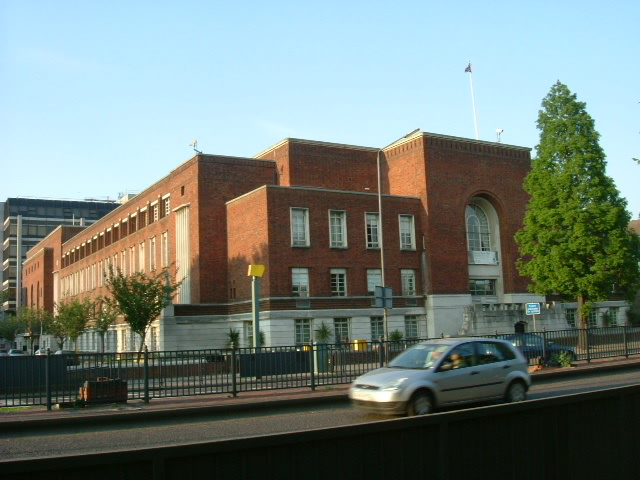
- Civic Campus, 1 Unity Square, Hammersmith, London, W6 9JU

Website
- www.lbhf.gov.uk

Hammersmith and Fulham London Borough Council, known as Hammersmith and Fulham Council, is the local authority for the London Borough of Hammersmith and Fulham in Greater London, England. The council has been under Labour majority control since 2014, and the council is responsible for the provision of certain services within the borough. The council's usual meeting place is at Hammersmith Town Hall.

== History ==
The London Borough of Hammersmith (as it was originally named) and its council were created under the London Government Act 1963, with the first election held in 1964. For its first year the council acted as a shadow authority alongside the area's two outgoing authorities, being the metropolitan borough councils of Fulham and Hammersmith. The new council formally came into its powers on 1 April 1965, at which point the old districts and their councils were abolished.

The council changed the borough's name from 'Hammersmith' to 'Hammersmith and Fulham' with effect from 1 April 1979. Since then, the council's full legal name has been "The Mayor and Burgesses of the London Borough of Hammersmith and Fulham", but it styles itself Hammersmith and Fulham Council.

From 1965 until 1986 the council was a lower-tier authority, with upper-tier functions provided by the Greater London Council. The split of powers and functions meant that the Greater London Council was responsible for "wide area" services such as fire, ambulance, flood prevention, and refuse disposal; with the boroughs (including Hammersmith and Fulham) responsible for "personal" services such as social care, libraries, cemeteries and refuse collection. The Greater London Council was abolished in 1986 and its functions passed to the London Boroughs, with some services provided through joint committees. Hammersmith and Fulham became a local education authority in 1990 when the Inner London Education Authority was dissolved.

Since 2000 the Greater London Authority has taken some responsibility for highways and planning control from the council, but within the English local government system the council remains a "most purpose" authority in terms of the available range of powers and functions.

The council was involved in a landmark English administrative law case in 1991, Hazell v Hammersmith and Fulham LBC, which ruled that local authorities had no power to engage in interest rate swap agreements because they were beyond the council's borrowing powers.

In 2021 the council was said by the Housing Ombudsman to be the worst performing landlord in the country with regard to damp and mould in its properties.

== Powers and functions ==
The local authority derives its powers and functions from the London Government Act 1963 and subsequent legislation, and has the powers and functions of a London borough council. It sets council tax and as a billing authority it also collects precepts for Greater London Authority functions and business rates. It sets planning policies which complement Greater London Authority and national policies, and decides on almost all planning applications accordingly. It is also the local education authority.

== Political control ==
The council has been under Labour majority control since 2014.

The first election was held in 1964, initially operating as a shadow authority alongside the outgoing authorities until it came into its powers on 1 April 1965. Political control of the council since 1965 has been as follows:

Party in control	Years
Labour	1965–1968
Conservative	1968–1971
Labour	1971–1978
No overall control	1978–1986
Labour	1986–2006
Conservative	2006–2014
Labour	2014–present

=== Leadership ===
The role of Mayor of Hammersmith and Fulham is largely ceremonial. Political leadership is instead provided by the leader of the council. The leaders since 1965 have been:

Councillor	Party	From	To
John Heaks	Labour	1965	1966
Anthony Chapman	Labour	1966	1968
William Smith	Conservative	1968	1971
Alfred Little	Labour	1971	1973
Barry Stead	Labour	1973	1978
Stuart Leishman	Conservative	1978	1979
Kim Howe	Conservative	1979	1985
John Putnam	Conservative	1985	1986
Gordon Prentice	Labour	1986	1988
Mike Goodman	Labour	1988	1991
Iain Coleman	Labour	1991	1996
Andy Slaughter	Labour	1996	May 2005
Stephen Burke	Labour	25 May 2005	May 2006
Stephen Greenhalgh	Conservative	24 May 2006	30 May 2012
Nick Botterill	Conservative	30 May 2012	May 2014
Stephen Cowan	Labour	16 Jun 2014	

=== Composition ===
Following the 2026 election, the composition of the council was as follows:

Party	Councillors
Labour	38
Conservative	12
Total	50

The next election is due in May 2030.

== Wards ==
The wards of Hammersmith and Fulham and the number of seats:

1. Addison (2)
2. Avonmore (2)
3. Brook Green (2)
4. College Park & Old Oak (3)
5. Coningham (3)
6. Fulham Reach (3)
7. Fulham Town (2)
8. Grove (2)
9. Hammersmith Broadway (2)
10. Lillie (2)
11. Munster (3)
12. Palace and Hurlingham (3)
13. Parsons Green & Sandford (2)
14. Ravenscourt (2)
15. Sands End (3)
16. Shepherd's Bush Green (2)
17. Walham Green (2)
18. Wendell Park (2)
19. West Kensington (3)
20. White City (3)
21. Wormholt (2)

== Elections ==
Since the last boundary changes in 2022 the council has comprised 50 councillors representing 21 wards, with each ward electing two or three councillors. Elections are held every four years.

== Premises ==
The council is based at the Civic Campus at 1 Unity Square in Hammersmith. The Civic Campus lies on the south side of King Street and comprises a new public square called Unity Square and a number of modern buildings built between 2019 and 2026 around the refurbished Hammersmith Town Hall, which had been completed in 1939 for the old Hammersmith Borough Council.

The first meeting in the refurbished council chamber in the Town Hall on the Civic Campus was held in February 2026.

== See also ==
- London Plus Credit Union

Awards and achievements
Preceded by Leicestershire	LGC Council of the Year; 2010	Succeeded by Blackburn with Darwen
