= Sands End (ward) =

Electoral ward in London, England

- Electoral ward for the Hammersmith and Fulham London Borough Council
- Borough: Hammersmith and Fulham
- County: Greater London
- Population: 11,129 (2021)
- Area: 0.7602 km²

Current electoral ward
- Created: 1978
- Councillors: 3 (since 2002); 2 (1978 to 2002)

Sands End is an electoral ward in the London Borough of Hammersmith and Fulham. The ward was first used in the 1978 elections and elects three councillors to Hammersmith and Fulham London Borough Council.

== Geography ==
The ward is named after the area of Sands End.

== Councillors ==
Election	Councillors		
2022	Paul Alexander (Labour)	Ann Rosenberg (Labour)	Ashok Patel (Labour)

== Elections ==
=== 2022 ===
Sands End (3)
Party	Candidate	Votes	%	±%
Labour	Paul Alexander	1,199	50.5	
Labour	Ann Rosenberg	1,177	49.6	
Labour	Ashok Patel	1,098	46.3	
Conservative	Constance Campbell	970	40.9	
Conservative	Liam Downer-Sanderson	912	38.4	
Conservative	Stewart Waine	869	36.6	
Liberal Democrats	Ray Burnet	297	12.5	
Liberal Democrats	Gerald Milch	203	8.6	
Turnout		2,374	32.4	
Labour hold				
Labour hold				
Labour hold				

== See also ==
- List of electoral wards in Greater London
