= Ravenscourt (ward) =

Electoral ward in London, England

- Electoral ward for the Hammersmith and Fulham London Borough Council
- Borough: Hammersmith and Fulham
- County: Greater London
- Population: 6,932 (2021)
- Area: 0.7571 km²

Current electoral ward
- Created: 2022
- Number of members: 3
- Councillors: Liz Collins; Patrick Walsh
- Created from: Ravenscourt Park

Ravenscourt is an electoral ward in the London Borough of Hammersmith and Fulham. The ward was first used in the 2022 elections and elects two councillors to Hammersmith and Fulham London Borough Council.

== Geography ==
The ward is named after the area of Ravenscourt.

== Councillors ==
Election	Councillors	
2022	Liz Collins (Labour)	Patrick Walsh (Labour)

== Elections ==
=== 2022 ===
Ravenscourt (2)
Party	Candidate	Votes	%	±%
Labour	Liz Collins	1,262	60.1	
Labour	Patrick Walsh	1,088	51.8	
Conservative	Hugo Fitzgerald	515	24.5	
Conservative	Mark Higton	497	23.7	
Green	Aileen-Ann Gonsalves	277	13.2	
Liberal Democrats	Henrietta Bewley	275	13.1	
Liberal Democrats	Michael Cook	200	9.5	
Turnout		2,101	42.9	
Labour win (new seat)				
Labour win (new seat)				

== See also ==
- List of electoral wards in Greater London
