= Addison (ward) =

Electoral ward in London, England

- Electoral ward for the Hammersmith and Fulham London Borough Council
- Borough: Hammersmith and Fulham
- County: Greater London
- Population: 7,718 (2021)
- Area: 0.3702 km²

Current electoral ward
- Created: 1965
- Councillors: 2 (1978-2002, 2022-present); 3 (1964-1978, 2002-2022)

Addison is an electoral ward in the London Borough of Hammersmith and Fulham. The ward was first used in the 1964 elections and elects two councillors to Hammersmith and Fulham London Borough Council.

== Geography ==
The ward is named after the 18th century poet Joseph Addison.

== Councillors ==
Election	Councillors	
2022	Jacolyn Daly (Labour)	Ross Melton (Labour)

== Elections ==
=== 2022 ===
Addison (2)
Party	Candidate	Votes	%	±%
Labour	Jacolyn Daly	1,291	75.8	
Labour	Ross Melton	1,195	70.1	
Conservative	Letitia Davies	276	16.2	
Liberal Democrats	Janet Burden	259	15.2	
Conservative	Mark Loveday	249	14.6	
Turnout		1,704	30.7	
Labour hold		Swing		
Labour hold		Swing		

== See also ==
- List of electoral wards in Greater London
