= Coningham (ward) =

Electoral ward in London, England

- Electoral ward for the Hammersmith and Fulham London Borough Council
- Borough: Hammersmith and Fulham
- County: Greater London
- Population: 10,585 (2021)
- Area: 0.5749 km²

Current electoral ward
- Created: 2022
- Councillors: 3

Coningham is an electoral ward in the London Borough of Hammersmith and Fulham. The ward was first used in the 2022 elections and elects three councillors to Hammersmith and Fulham London Borough Council.

== Geography ==
The ward is named after the area of Coningham.

== Councillors ==
Election	Councillors		
2022	Lisa Homan (Labour)	Rowan Ree (Labour)	Rory Vaughan (Labour)

== Elections ==
=== 2022 ===
Coningham (3)
Party	Candidate	Votes	%	±%
Labour	Lisa Homan	1,529	67.2	
Labour	Rowan Ree	1,305	57.3	
Labour	Rory Vaughan	1,247	54.8	
Green	Colin Murphy	531	23.3	
Green	Amelia Walker	459	20.2	
Green	Benjamin Simms	347	15.2	
Conservative	Robert Iggulden	302	13.3	
Conservative	Lavente Kiss	291	12.8	
Conservative	Benjamin Ransom	281	12.3	
Liberal Democrats	Catherine Remy	175	7.7	
Liberal Democrats	David Miller	153	6.7	
Turnout		2,276	30.1	
Labour win (new seat)				
Labour win (new seat)				
Labour win (new seat)				

== See also ==
- List of electoral wards in Greater London
