= Brook Green (ward) =

Electoral ward in London, England

- Electoral ward for the Hammersmith and Fulham London Borough Council
- Borough: Hammersmith and Fulham
- County: Greater London
- Population: 8,250 (2021)
- Major settlements: Brook Green
- Area: 0.7064 km²

Current electoral ward
- Created: 2022, 1965
- Councillors: 2 (2022-present); 3 (1964-1978); 2 (1978-2002)

Brook Green is an electoral ward in the London Borough of Hammersmith and Fulham. The ward in its current form was first used in the 2022 elections and elects two councillors to Hammersmith and Fulham London Borough Council. It was previously in use from 1964 to 2002.

== Geography ==
The ward is named after the suburb of Brook Green.

== Councillors ==
Election	Councillors	
2022	Stala Antoniades (Labour)	Adam Lang (Labour)

== Elections ==
=== 2022 ===
Brook Green (2)
Party	Candidate	Votes	%	±%
Labour	Stala Antoniades	1,237	58.2	
Labour	Adam Lang	1,141	53.7	
Conservative	Charlotte Duthie	639	30.1	
Conservative	Simon Hewitt	625	29.4	
Liberal Democrats	Dorothy Brooks	275	12.9	
Liberal Democrats	Niamh McCarthy	253	11.9	
Turnout		2,126	37.7	
Labour win (new seat)				
Labour win (new seat)				

== See also ==
- List of electoral wards in Greater London
