= 2026 Kensington and Chelsea London Borough Council election =

2026 English local government election

2026 Kensington & Chelsea London Borough Council election
- 7 May 2026

All 50 seats to Kensington & Chelsea London Borough Council 26 seats needed for a majority
- Registered: 94,832
- Turnout: 35,344; 37.3%
	First party	Second party	Third party
Leader	Elizabeth Campbell	Kasim Ali	Linda Wade
Party	Conservative	Labour	Liberal Democrats
Last election	35 seats, 43.9%	13 seats, 31.8%	2 seats, 21.2%
Seats before	36	7	2
Seats won	34	13	3
Seat change	▼1	Steady	▲1
	Fourth party
Party	Green
Last election	0 seats, 2.5%
Seats before	1
Seats won	0
Seat change	Steady
- Results of the 2026 Kensington and Chelsea London Borough council election. Conservatives in blue, Labour in red and Liberal Democrats in orange.
Leader before election
Elizabeth Campbell
Conservative
Leader after election
Elizabeth Campbell
Conservative

The 2026 Kensington and Chelsea London Borough Council election took place on 7 May 2026. All 50 members of Kensington and Chelsea London Borough Council were elected. The elections took place alongside local elections in the other London boroughs and elections to local authorities across the United Kingdom.

The election saw the council remain under Conservative majority control, as it has been since its creation in 1965.

== Background ==
In May 2024, Conservative candidate Stéphanie Petit won the Norland by-election.

== Previous council composition ==
After 2022 election		Before 2026 election		After 2026 election	
Party	Seats	Party	Seats	Party	Seats
Conservative	35	Conservative	36	Conservative	34
Labour	13	Labour	7	Labour	13
Liberal Democrats	2	Liberal Democrats	2	Liberal Democrats	3
Green	0	Green	1	Green	0
Independent	0	Independent	4	Independent	0

Changes 2022–2026:

- April 2023: Emma Dent Coad (Labour) leaves party to sit as an independent
- October 2023:
  - Eva Jedut (Labour) expelled from party
  - Mona Ahmed (Labour) leaves party to sit as an independent
- December 2023: Mona Adam (Labour) joins Greens
- March 2024:
  - Stuart Graham (Conservative) resigns – by-election held May 2024
  - Dahabo Isse (Labour) joins Conservatives
- May 2024: Stephanie Petit (Conservative) wins by-election
- October 2025: Toby Benton (Labour) leaves party to sit as an independent

== Election results ==
Council composition after the 2022 election

Council composition after the 2026 election

=== Election result ===
2026 Kensington and Chelsea London Borough Council election
Party	Candidates	Seats	Gains	Losses	Net gain/loss	Seats %	Votes %	Votes	+/−
Conservative	50	34	-	1	▼1	68.00	50.40	47,535	▲6.50
Labour	50	13	-	-	Steady	26.00	18.98	17,906	▼12.82
Liberal Democrats	50	3	1	-	▲1	6.00	12.25	11,553	▼8.95
Reform	50	0	-	-	Steady	-	9.61	9,068	NEW
Green	21	0	-	-	Steady	-	8.21	7,745	▲5.71
Independent	5	0	-	-	Steady	-	0.55	521	▼0.15

== Ward results ==
=== Abingdon ===
Abingdon (3)
Party	Candidate	Votes	%
Conservative	Sarah Addenbrooke	1,248	23
Conservative	Anne Cyron	1,177	22
Conservative	James Husband	1,170	22
Green	Guler Ergun	249	5
Liberal Democrats	Angus Cameron	218	4
Liberal Democrats	Jeremy Good	210	4
Labour	Pat Healy	200	4
Labour	Annabelle Louvros	195	4
Liberal Democrats	Jonathan Owen	168	3
Labour	Andrew Moran	159	3
Reform	Justin Cook	137	3
Reform	Fiona McWatters	127	2
Reform	Max Windsor	124	2

=== Brompton & Hans Town ===
Brompton & Hans Town (3)
Party	Candidate	Votes	%
Conservative	Sof McVeigh	1,084	23
Conservative	Mary Weale	1,081	23
Conservative	Walaa Idris	1,072	23
Reform	Bella Buchanan	224	5
Reform	Penelope Bouchot-Humbert	218	5
Reform	Suzy Lewis	198	4
Labour	Marian Kearney	193	4
Liberal Democrats	Maurizio Campolo	178	4
Liberal Democrats	Rees Cowne	173	4
Labour	Kasper Moller	168	4
Liberal Democrats	Alia Mahmud	165	3
Labour	Ambigai Waters	161	3

=== Campden ===
Campden (3)
Party	Candidate	Votes	%
Conservative	Catherine Faulks	1,405	23
Conservative	Preety Hudd	1,308	22
Conservative	Lloyd North	1,282	21
Labour	Otto Barrow	310	5
Liberal Democrats	Christopher Bellamy	303	5
Labour	Ruth Daniel	284	5
Liberal Democrats	Juan Carrizosa	279	5
Liberal Democrats	Juni Farmanfarmian	245	4
Labour	Ouafae Elmansouri	242	4
Reform	Victoria Chapman	213	4
Reform	Alistair Wellmann	176	3
Reform	Yosr Ismail	142	2
Independent	Stehpen Conboy	78	1

=== Chelsea Riverside ===
Chelsea Riverside (3)
Party	Candidate	Votes	%
Conservative	Laura Burns	1,073	16
Conservative	Heena Bellara	1,015	15
Conservative	Max Chauhan	969	15
Labour	Anne Corbett	498	8
Labour	Michael Coelho	486	7
Labour	Keith Cunningham	412	6
Green	Julian Burger	405	6
Reform	Andrew David Barclay	354	5
Reform	Alexa Jago	307	5
Reform	Henry Woodruff	288	4
Independent	Amal Ah Bider	281	4
Liberal Democrats	Moya Denman	187	3
Liberal Democrats	Peter Kosta	155	2
Liberal Democrats	Margo Schwartz	155	2

=== Colville ===
Colville (3)
Party	Candidate	Votes	%
Labour	Monica Press	821	13
Labour	Cihan Cheron	745	12
Labour	Jack Reason	739	12
Green	Samantha Batra	535	9
Green	Wilson Brathwaite	509	8
Green	Steph Warrick	467	8
Conservative	Elena Gheorghe	426	7
Conservative	Minna Korjonen	407	7
Conservative	Rahul Tharmaratnam	360	6
Reform	Theodore Karpinski	203	3
Reform	Deborah Skinner	198	3
Reform	Matthew Snell	195	3
Liberal Democrats	Tom Mayers	192	3
Liberal Democrats	Cyrus Ardalan	182	3
Liberal Democrats	Brian Orrell	154	3

=== Courtfield ===
Courtfield (3)
Party	Candidate	Votes	%
Conservative	Gregory Hammond	1,285	25
Conservative	Janet Evans	1,262	24
Conservative	Quentin Marshall	1,211	23
Liberal Democrats	Luisa Esposito	191	4
Liberal Democrats	Christophe Noblet	154	3
Labour	Alex Anstruther	143	3
Reform	Robert Fleming	141	3
Liberal Democrats	Vincent Lowe	140	3
Green	Theo Verden	140	3
Reform	Claire Wheately	132	3
Labour	Tina Alkaff	128	2
Labour	Margaret Pringle	119	2
Reform	Luke Wates	118	2

=== Dalgarno ===
Dalgarno (2)
Party	Candidate	Votes	%
Labour Co-op	Abdullahi Nur	593	19
Labour Co-op	Alex Porter	577	18
Green	Rahul Imran	400	13
Green	Rayen Naghi	386	12
Conservative	Alex De Silva	304	10
Conservative	Gordon Newell	250	8
Reform	Margaret Louise Parker	239	8
Reform	Albert Woodruff	206	6
Liberal Democrats	Alex Tatton-Brown	84	3
Liberal Democrats	Nuria Sabin-Mosquera	71	2
Independent	Eva Jedut	64	2

=== Earl's Court ===
Earl's Court (3)
Party	Candidate	Votes	%
Liberal Democrats	Linda Wade	1,205	18
Liberal Democrats	James Ortiz	972	14
Liberal Democrats	Sofia Gurrola	967	14
Conservative	Andrea Dardi	826	12
Conservative	Brian Stephens	815	12
Conservative	Esther Idoko	733	11
Green	Elske Waite	259	4
Labour	Chloe Braganca	229	3
Labour	David O'Connell	194	3
Labour	John Winter	175	3
Reform	Adam Burclaff	139	2
Reform	Natalia Jesurun	113	2
Reform	Anas Hassan	99	1

=== Golborne ===
Golborne (3)
Party	Candidate	Votes	%
Labour Co-op	Nadia Nail	704	14
Labour Co-op	Sina Lari	696	14
Labour Co-op	Peter Marshall	658	13
Green	Mona Adam	608	12
Green	Alex Clarke	546	11
Green	Bhupinder Sudan	435	9
Conservative	Harry Hopkins	210	4
Conservative	Ellie Lines	203	4
Conservative	Kieran Terry	194	4
Reform	Donovan Gill	171	3
Reform	Deida Acero	161	3
Reform	Krzysztof Ziembla	139	3
Liberal Democrats	Sabina Kelly	98	2
Liberal Democrats	Andrew Roland	76	2
Liberal Democrats	Tony Somers	58	1

=== Holland ===
Holland (3)
Party	Candidate	Votes	%
Conservative	Lucy Knight	1,408	22
Conservative	Johnny Thalassites	1,390	22
Conservative	Aarien Areti	1,360	22
Labour	Caterina Perrone	409	7
Green	Lena El-Malak	336	5
Labour	Sonny Remmer-Riley	334	5
Labour	Lina El Baz	187	3
Liberal Democrats	Daniel Borrero Fresno	187	3
Liberal Democrats	Nadia Macdonald	180	3
Liberal Democrats	Hugh Lalor	157	3
Reform	Arman Rahimi	119	2
Reform	Nellie Mirnezami	108	2
Reform	Maahan Mirnezami	99	2

=== Norland ===
Norland (2)
Party	Candidate	Votes	%
Conservative	Stéphanie Petit	964	32
Conservative	Marc Goldfinger	936	31
Labour	Max Alexander	266	9
Green	Angela Georgievski	216	7
Labour	Amal Saleh	198	6
Liberal Democrats	Carmel McLoughlin	140	5
Liberal Democrats	Joe Mayers	126	4
Reform	Adam Irving	123	4
Reform	David Spring	88	3

=== Notting Dale ===
Notting Dale (3)
Party	Candidate	Votes	%
Labour	Kasim Ali	944	17
Labour	Claire Simmons	893	16
Labour	Portia Thaxter	798	14
Green	Rema Farhan	524	9
Green	Jamie Rahman	448	8
Conservative	Cordelia Evans	303	5
Conservative	Tom Montgomery	284	5
Conservative	Ben Fforde	280	5
Reform	Adrian Cardenas	271	5
Reform	Robin Hobbs	247	4
Reform	Angela Defoe	226	4
Liberal Democrats	Ben Mayers	127	2
Liberal Democrats	Gillian Shaw	117	2
Liberal Democrats	Yury Kanavalau	112	2
Independent	Zack Gilpin	29	1

=== Pembridge ===
Pembridge (2)
Party	Candidate	Votes	%
Conservative	Georgia Hardisty	735	26
Conservative	Natacha Tannous	710	25
Liberal Democrats	Sam Dodgshon	501	18
Liberal Democrats	Hridi Chowdhury	464	16
Labour	Ayah Mamode	147	5
Labour	Taif Rahman	130	5
Reform	Henry McWatters	85	3
Reform	Kristi Gulliver	74	3

=== Queen's Gate ===
Queen's Gate (3)
Party	Candidate	Votes	%
Conservative	Sam Mackover	1,075	24
Conservative	Max Dodd-Noble	1,051	23
Conservative	Ned Whitley	994	22
Liberal Democrats	Sheila McGuirk	203	4
Green	Max Dunne	193	4
Liberal Democrats	Luke Woollen	161	4
Labour	Linda Reid	151	3
Labour	Bob Mingay	134	3
Liberal Democrats	Pawel Urbanski	128	3
Reform	Kezia Noble	120	3
Reform	Thomas Walker	115	3
Labour	Keith Stirling	104	2
Reform	Juliet Zhong	102	2

=== Redcliffe ===
Redcliffe (3)
Party	Candidate	Votes	%
Conservative	Tom Bennett	1,293	22
Conservative	Marie-Therese Rossi	1,225	21
Conservative	Sidney Yankson	1,181	20
Liberal Democrats	Jean-Francois Burford	266	5
Labour	Maria Arana	255	4
Liberal Democrats	Marguerite Ohan	228	4
Green	Genevieve Shanahan	227	4
Labour	Robert Atkinson	226	4
Liberal Democrats	Michael Zihan Jin	207	4
Reform	Alexander Hewett	188	3
Reform	Emma Hollands	185	3
Labour	Lucas Cadman	179	3
Reform	Jonathan O'Keefe	155	3

=== Royal Hospital ===
Royal Hospital (3)
Party	Candidate	Votes	%
Conservative	Elizabeth Campbell	1,671	24
Conservative	Emma Will	1,547	22
Conservative	Cem Kemahli	1,530	22
Reform	Deborah Iliffe	329	5
Reform	Paul Kerr	310	4
Reform	David Linsey	298	4
Labour	Helen Ashby	220	3
Green	Alice Clack	212	3
Liberal Democrats	Caroline Church	188	3
Labour	Abdulmajid Malin	160	2
Liberal Democrats	Penelope Pocock	158	2
Labour	Stuart Shapro	137	2
Liberal Democrats	Alexandra Walker	133	2

=== St Helen's ===
St Helen's (2)
Party	Candidate	Votes	%
Labour Co-op	Billy Beckett	648	19
Labour Co-op	Lucy Shaw	615	18
Conservative	Yusuf Ibrahim	589	17
Conservative	Maxwell Woodger	586	17
Green	Doulla Croft	346	10
Green	Charles Foster-Hall	304	9
Reform	Charles Dunn	144	4
Reform	Henry Sire	122	3
Liberal Democrats	Paula McPherson	76	2
Liberal Democrats	Rosemary Somers	63	2

=== Stanley ===
Stanley (3)
Party	Candidate	Votes	%
Conservative	Will Pascall	1,359	21
Conservative	Josh Rendall	1,356	21
Conservative	Kim Taylor-Smith	1,338	21
Labour	Sylvia Parnell	328	5
Labour	Ali Awil	320	5
Labour	Hassan Muhamud	294	5
Reform	Emma Mackenzie	286	4
Reform	Marc Burca	263	4
Reform	Lucy Woodruff	249	4
Liberal Democrats	Jose Buera	236	4
Liberal Democrats	Carl Michel	231	4
Liberal Democrats	Arsalan Nazim	184	3
Independent	Iain A Smith	69	1
