= 1998 Kensington and Chelsea London Borough Council election =

- 7 May 1998

54 seats up for election to Kensington and Chelsea London Borough Council 28 seats needed for a majority
- Registered: 102,291
- Turnout: 28,644, 28.00% (▼8.89)

	First party	Second party	Third party
Party	Conservative	Labour	Liberal Democrats
Last election	39 seats, 48.23%	15 seats, 32.07%	0 seats, 16.37%
Seats won	39	15	0
Seat change	Steady	Steady	Steady
Popular vote	36,936	23,121	10,038
Percentage	50.37	31.53%	13.69%
Swing	▲2.14	▼0.54	▼2.68
Council control before election
Conservative Party (UK)
Council control after election
Conservative Party (UK)

The 1998 Kensington and Chelsea Council election took place on 7 May 1998 to elect members of Kensington and Chelsea London Borough Council in London, England. The whole council was up for election and the Conservative Party stayed in overall control of the council.

At the same election, the Kensington and Chelsea saw 70.3% vote in favour of the 1998 Greater London Authority referendum and 29.7% against, on a 27.9% turnout.

== Election result ==
Following the election the Conservative leader of the council, Joan Hanham, was challenged for the leadership of the party group by Daniel Moylan, but Hanham won a ballot of the Conservative councillors to remain leader.

Kensington and Chelsea local election result 1998
Party	Seats	Gains	Losses	Net gain/loss	Seats %	Votes %	Votes	+/−
Conservative	39	0	0	Steady	72.22	50.37	36,936	▲2.14
Labour	15	0	0	Steady	27.78	31.53	23,121	▼0.54
Liberal Democrats	0	0	0	Steady	0.00	13.69	10,038	▼2.68
Independent	0	0	0	Steady	0.00	0.32	234	▲0.12
Total	54						73,329	

== Ward results ==
(*) - indicates an incumbent candidate

(†) - Indicates an incumbent candidate standing in a different ward

=== Abingdon ===
Abingdon (3)
Party	Candidate	Votes	%	±%
Conservative	Elizabeth Christmas*	1,046	70.12	▲7.84
Conservative	Mark Field*	987		
Conservative	Jonathan Munday*	971		
Labour	Bruce Howard	233	15.87	▲3.71
Liberal Democrats	John Faulder	232	14.01	▼3.21
Labour	Anthony Spencer	229		
Labour	Graham Robinson	218		
Liberal Democrats	Kishwer Khan	187		
Liberal Democrats	James Sandbach	181		
Registered electors		5,488		▲652
Turnout		1,537	28.01	▼5.88
Rejected ballots		12	0.78	▲0.60
Conservative hold				
Conservative hold				
Conservative hold				

=== Avondale ===
Avondale (3)
Party	Candidate	Votes	%	±%
Labour	Simon Blanchflower	1,012	59.51	▼3.16
Labour	Simon Stanley	937		
Labour	Allah Lasharie*	904		
Conservative	David Lindsay	454	27.72	▲1.75
Conservative	Mark Fowler	451		
Conservative	Amanda Sayers	424		
Liberal Democrats	Robert Boddington	247	12.77	▲1.41
Liberal Democrats	David Shaw	193		
Liberal Democrats	Alexander Werner	172		
Registered electors		5,417		▲327
Turnout		1,709	31.55	▼9.47
Rejected ballots		15	0.88	▲0.59
Labour hold				
Labour hold				
Labour hold				

=== Brompton ===
Brompton (2)
Party	Candidate	Votes	%	±%
Conservative	David Hudson*	474	69.29	▲0.62
Conservative	Shireen Ritchie	440		
Labour	John Manning	107	16.15	▲2.74
Labour	Deirdre O'Day	106		
Liberal Democrats	Julian England	105	14.56	▼3.36
Liberal Democrats	Diana Tupper	87		
Registered electors		2,839		▲332
Turnout		702	24.73	▼5.31
Rejected ballots		8	1.14	▲0.87
Conservative hold				
Conservative hold				

=== Campden ===
Campden (3)
Party	Candidate	Votes	%	±%
Conservative	Richard Ahern	1,062	69.90	▲2.21
Conservative	Christopher Buckmaster*	1,050		
Conservative	Robert Freeman	1,042		
Labour	Jane Armstrong	290	16.40	▲0.30
Liberal Democrats	Michael Allen	235	13.70	▼2.51
Labour	Thomas Brown	232		
Liberal Democrats	Imogen Caterer	220		
Labour	John McIntosh	218		
Liberal Democrats	Roberta Haseler	163		
Registered electors		5,252		▲349
Turnout		1,572	29.93	▼7.94
Rejected ballots		15	0.95	▲0.73
Conservative hold				
Conservative hold				
Conservative hold				

=== Cheyne ===
Cheyne (2)
Party	Candidate	Votes	%	±%
Conservative	John Corbet-Singleton*	1,059	72.45	▲1.44
Conservative	Paul Warrick^{†} (Note: Warrick was a sitting councillor representing the Earls Court ward)	953		
Labour	Margaret Corbett	212	15.16	▲1.25
Labour	Param Bhinder	209		
Liberal Democrats	Ann Lawrence	196	12.39	▼2.69
Liberal Democrats	Valerie Chancellor	148		
Registered electors		4,494		▲433
Turnout		1,460	32.49	▼7.01
Rejected ballots		13	0.89	▲0.69
Conservative hold				
Conservative hold				

=== Church ===
Church (2)
Party	Candidate	Votes	%	±%
Conservative	Adrian Fitzgerald*	651	60.01	▲0.83
Conservative	Joanna Gardener	629		
Labour	Caroline Ellis	336	30.90	▲15.28
Labour	Jacob Tompkins	323		
Liberal Democrats	Susan Coats	98	9.09	▼2.84
Liberal Democrats	Andrew Coats	96		
Registered electors		3,225		▲60
Turnout		1,119	34.70	▼4.26
Rejected ballots		1	0.09	▼0.23
Conservative hold				
Conservative hold				

=== Colville ===
Colville (3)
Party	Candidate	Votes	%	±%
Labour	Robert Pope*	910	63.32	▼1.22
Labour	Judith Blakeman^{†} (Note: Blakeman was a sitting councillor representing the Avondale ward)	879		
Labour	Patricia Healy*	818		
Liberal Democrats	Priscilla Congreve	284	17.10	▲4.48
Conservative	Nicola Cohen	282	19.58	▼3.25
Conservative	Graham Rhodes	263		
Conservative	Jonathan Clamp	261		
Liberal Democrats	Christine Ingham	239		
Liberal Democrats	Patrick Mayers	181		
Registered electors		5,466		▲342
Turnout		1,505	27.53	▼9.47
Rejected ballots		25	1.66	▲1.45
Labour hold				
Labour hold				
Labour hold				

=== Courtfield ===
Courtfield (3)
Party	Candidate	Votes	%	±%
Conservative	Anthony Coates*	781	72.76	▲24.79
Conservative	Edward Cox*	743		
Conservative	Lawrence Holt*	730		
Labour	Jean Navassardian	185	17.66	▲8.79
Labour	Christine Robson	184		
Labour	Robert Mingay	178		
Liberal Democrats	Anthony Dunn	114	9.59	▼33.57
Liberal Democrats	Rosemary Somers	106		
Liberal Democrats	Angele Vidal-Hall	77		
Registered electors		5,680		▲1,066
Turnout		1,205	21.21	▼11.52
Rejected ballots		8	0.66	Steady
Conservative hold				
Conservative hold				
Conservative hold				

=== Earls Court ===
Earls Court (3)
Party	Candidate	Votes	%	±%
Conservative	Barry Phelps*	901	38.18	▲3.68
Conservative	Thomas Fairhead*	781		
Conservative	Timothy Tannock	771		
Labour	Joel Bishop	657	29.19	▼0.91
Labour	Christine Henry	641		
Labour	Stephen Johnson	577		
Liberal Democrats	Linda Wade	491	21.70	▼5.64
Liberal Democrats	John Drake	471		
Liberal Democrats	Sarah Franks	432		
Independent	Malcolm Spalding	234	10.93	New
Registered electors		7,208		▲836
Turnout		1,914	26.55	▼8.13
Rejected ballots		9	0.47	▲0.20
Conservative hold				
Conservative hold				
Conservative hold				

=== Golborne ===
Golborne (3)
Party	Candidate	Votes	%	±%
Labour	Patrick Mason*	982	73.82	▼5.11
Labour	Bridget Hoier*	954		
Labour	Stuart Shapro	833		
Liberal Democrats	Aria Kovatzis	192	13.20	▲3.71
Conservative	Octavius Black	177	12.98	▲1.40
Liberal Democrats	Frances Owen	160		
Conservative	Terence Muxton	156		
Conservative	Vaneeta Saroop	154		
Liberal Democrats	Rosemary Pettit	143		
Registered electors		5,159		▲161
Turnout		1,460	28.30	▼11.34
Rejected ballots		35	2.40	▲1.84
Labour hold				
Labour hold				
Labour hold				

=== Hans Town ===
Hans Town (3)
Party	Candidate	Votes	%	±%
Conservative	Timothy Coleridge	936	77.48	▲3.89
Conservative	Nicholas Paget-Brown*	886		
Conservative	Mary Weale*	865		
Labour	Angela Lambert	165	13.32	▲0.98
Labour	Michael Henry	158		
Labour	Robert Pandy	139		
Liberal Democrats	Angela Le Franc	114	9.20	▼4.87
Liberal Democrats	Rodney Schwartz	103		
Liberal Democrats	Guy Shanley	102		
Registered electors		5,087		▲891
Turnout		1,244	24.45	▼8.20
Rejected ballots		0	0.00	Steady
Conservative hold				
Conservative hold				
Conservative hold				

=== Holland ===
Holland (3)
Party	Candidate	Votes	%	±%
Conservative	Joan Hanham*	999	67.78	
Conservative	Bryan Levitt*	939		
Conservative	Warwick Lightfoot*	908		
Labour	Marian Kearney	256	17.31	
Labour	Stephen Daly	236		
Labour	Bernard Hamilton	235		
Liberal Democrats	Christopher Shirley	226	14.91	
Liberal Democrats	David Bewley	208		
Liberal Democrats	Hugh Venables	192		
Registered electors		5,593		
Turnout		1,537	27.48	
Rejected ballots		21	1.37	
Conservative hold				
Conservative hold				
Conservative hold				

=== Kelfield ===
Kelfield (2)
Party	Candidate	Votes	%	±%
Labour	Keith Cunningham*	914	65.80	▲3.07
Labour	Stephen Hoier*	906		
Conservative	Gerard Hargreaves	341	21.91	▼0.79
Conservative	Ivan Rose	265		
Liberal Democrats	Joe Tatton-Brown	186	12.29	▼2.28
Liberal Democrats	Caryle Harris	154		
Registered electors		4,739		▲361
Turnout		1,403	29.61	▼10.61
Rejected ballots		13	0.93	▲0.59
Labour hold				
Labour hold				

=== Norland ===
Norland (2)
Party	Candidate	Votes	%	±%
Conservative	Ernest Tomlin*	675	62.00	▼0.46
Conservative	Brian Walker-Arnott*	656		
Labour	David MacFarlane	258	22.82	▲2.72
Labour	Hugh Raven	232		
Liberal Democrats	Rose Hunt	185	15.18	▼2.26
Liberal Democrats	Gordon Ritchie	141		
Registered electors		3,374		▲162
Turnout		1,122	33.25	▲11.30
Rejected ballots		4	0.36	▲0.15
Conservative hold				
Conservative hold				

=== North Stanley ===
North Stanley (2)
Party	Candidate	Votes	%	±%
Conservative	Priscilla Frazer*	768	67.57	▲9.80
Conservative	Merrick Cockell*	728		
Labour	Lesley-Anne Arnold	217	19.56	▼0.33
Labour	Stephen King	216		
Liberal Democrats	Dorothy Patrick	160	12.87	▼1.84
Liberal Democrats	William Somers	125		
Registered electors		4,329		▲76
Turnout		1,153	26.63	▼7.16
Rejected ballots		13	1.13	▲1.13
Conservative hold				
Conservative hold				

=== Pembridge ===
Pembridge (3)
Party	Candidate	Votes	%	±%
Conservative	Isobel Campbell*	867	52.37	▼1.63
Conservative	David Campion*	851		
Conservative	Doreen Weatherhead*	836		
Labour	Michael Cocks	555	32.83	▲6.60
Labour	Virginia Henley	535		
Labour	Ann O'Hare	511		
Liberal Democrats	John Campbell	277	14.80	▼4.97
Liberal Democrats	Vanessa Dowell	232		
Liberal Democrats	Patrick Spencer	213		
Registered electors		5,588		▲494
Turnout		1,754	31.39	▼8.40
Rejected ballots		14	0.80	▲0.70
Conservative hold				
Conservative hold				
Conservative hold				

=== Queen's Gate ===
Queen's Gate (3)
Party	Candidate	Votes	%	±%
Conservative	Daniel Moylan*	845	70.10	▼2.19
Conservative	Andrew Dalton*	842		
Conservative	Gary Mond* (Note: Mond was elected in a by-election triggered by the death of Cllr Elizabeth Russell in 1996)	822		
Liberal Democrats	Sally Galsworthy	218	15.42	▲0.26
Labour	Mary Blanchet	179	14.50	▲1.95
Liberal Democrats	Ann Ahern	170		
Labour	Norma Morris	170		
Labour	Natalie Pringle	170		
Liberal Democrats	Dorothy Venables	164		
Registered electors		5,366		▲872
Turnout		1,262	23.52	▼9.68
Rejected ballots		12	0.95	▲0.82
Conservative hold				
Conservative hold				
Conservative hold				

=== Redcliffe ===
Redcliffe (3)
Party	Candidate	Votes	%	±%
Conservative	Frances Taylor*	835	61.04	▲19.82
Conservative	Alick Whitfield*	748		
Conservative	John Seidler	739		
Labour	Margaret Delahey	273	19.72	▲7.24
Liberal Democrats	Barbara Woodthorpe Brown	263	19.24	▼11.37
Labour	Michael Costello	249		
Liberal Democrats	Robert Woodthorpe Brown	235		
Liberal Democrats	Emerson Roberts	234		
Labour	Louis Vaini-Husar	228		
Registered electors		5,601		▲457
Turnout		1,375	24.55	▼8.93
Rejected ballots		11	0.80	▲0.74
Conservative hold				
Conservative hold				
Conservative hold				

=== Royal Hospital ===
Royal Hospital (2)
Party	Candidate	Votes	%	±%
Conservative	Ian Donaldson*	681	74.62	▲1.11
Conservative	Jeremy Edge	633		
Liberal Democrats	Rosamund Pease	124	11.70	▼2.96
Labour	Alexander Pringle	123	13.68	▲1.85
Labour	John Wooten	118		
Liberal Democrats	Carl Michel	82		
Registered electors		3,553		▲383
Turnout		937	26.37	▼7.10
Rejected ballots		9	0.96	▲0.77
Conservative hold				
Conservative hold				

=== St Charles ===
St Charles (2)
Party	Candidate	Votes	%	±%
Labour	Rima Horton*	691	60.62	▼5.46
Labour	John Atkinson*	671		
Conservative	Matthew Palmer	366	28.39	▲4.64
Conservative	Martin Wright	272		
Liberal Democrats	Marion Parsons	142	10.99	▲0.81
Liberal Democrats	Alexandra Brown	105		
Registered electors		4,353		▲541
Turnout		1,414	32.48	▼7.16
Rejected ballots		11	0.78	▲0.71
Labour hold				
Labour hold				

=== South Stanley ===
South Stanley (2)
Party	Candidate	Votes	%	±%
Labour	Timothy Boulton*	686	53.54	▼6.25
Labour	Alastair Wood* (Note: Wood was elected in a by-election triggered by the resignation of Cllr Robert Weems in 1995)	666		
Conservative	William Wellesley	484	37.23	▲7.16
Conservative	Peter Wilson	456		
Liberal Democrats	Susan Pritchard	124	9.23	▼0.79
Liberal Democrats	Panayiotis Vardakis	109		
Registered electors		4,570		▲262
Turnout		1,260	27.57	▼15.54
Rejected ballots		12	0.95	▲0.79
Labour hold				
Labour hold				
