= 1994 Kensington and Chelsea London Borough Council election =

1994 local election in England

- 5 May 1994

All 54 seats up for election to Kensington and Chelsea London Borough Council 28 seats needed for a majority
- Registered: 92,575
- Turnout: 34,152, 36.89% (▼5.33)

	First party	Second party	Third party
Leader	Joan B. Hanham	Unknown	Unknown
Party	Conservative	Labour	Liberal Democrats
Leader since	1989	Unknown	Unknown
Leader's seat	Holland	Unknown	Unknown
Last election	39 seats, 51.83%	15 seats, 34.13%	0 seats, 10.95%
Seats won	39	15	0
Seat change	Steady	Steady	Steady
Popular vote	41,168	27,375	13,980
Percentage	48.23%	32.07%	16.37%
Swing	▼3.60	▼2.06	▲5.42
Council control before election
Conservative
Council control after election
Conservative

The 1994 Kensington and Chelsea Council election took place on 5 May 1994 to elect members of Kensington and Chelsea London Borough Council in London, England. The whole council was up for election and the Conservative party stayed in overall control of the council.

== Election result ==
1994 Kensington and Chelsea London Borough Council elections
Party	Seats	Gains	Losses	Net gain/loss	Seats %	Votes %	Votes	+/−
Conservative	39	0	0	Steady	72.22	48.23	41,168	▼3.60
Labour	15	0	0	Steady	27.78	32.07	27,375	▼2.06
Liberal Democrats	0	0	0	Steady	0.00	16.37	13,980	▲5.42
Residents	0	0	0	Steady	0.00	2.53	2,158	New
Green	0	0	0	Steady	0.00	0.60	511	▼0.90
Independent	0	0	0	Steady	0.00	0.20	169	▲0.10
Total	54						85,361	

== Ward results ==
(*) - Indicates an incumbent candidate

(†) - Indicates an incumbent candidate standing in a different ward

=== Abingdon ===
Abingdon (3)
Party	Candidate	Votes	%	±%
Conservative	Elizabeth Christmas*	1,097	62.28	▼3.21
Conservative	Jonathan Munday*	1,049		
Conservative	Mark Field	1,034		
Liberal Democrats	Donald Fair	310	17.22	▲6.93
Liberal Democrats	John Faulder	289		
Liberal Democrats	Daniel Giles	279		
Labour	Terence Courtney	216	12.16	▼1.29
Labour	Natalie Pringle	208		
Labour	Hussain Haider	196		
Green	Gillian Davies	142	8.34	▼2.43
Registered electors		4,836		▼94
Turnout		1,639	33.89	▼4.04
Rejected ballots		3	0.18	▲0.07
Conservative hold				
Conservative hold				
Conservative hold				

=== Avondale ===
Avondale (3)
Party	Candidate	Votes	%	±%
Labour	Jennifer Forsyth*	1,227	62.67	▼3.28
Labour	Judith Blakeman	1,209		
Labour	Allah Lasharie	1,103		
Conservative	David Lindsay	503	25.97	▲2.16
Conservative	Shaun Woodward	483		
Conservative	Vanessa Beard	482		
Liberal Democrats	Robert Boddington	234	11.36	▼1.12
Liberal Democrats	David Shaw	224		
Liberal Democrats	Angele Vidal-Hall	183		
Registered electors		5,090		▼1
Turnout		2,088	41.02	▼5.75
Rejected ballots		6	0.29	▲0.04
Labour hold				
Labour hold				
Labour hold				

=== Brompton ===
Brompton (2)
Party	Candidate	Votes	%	±%
Conservative	David Hudson*	515	68.67	▼3.99
Conservative	Simon Ingham*	489		
Liberal Democrats	Stephen Gould	135	17.92	▲5.81
Liberal Democrats	Robert Woodthorpe-Brown	126		
Labour	Simon Stanley	102	13.41	▼1.82
Labour	Richard Tyson	93		
Registered electors		2,507		▼65
Turnout		753	30.04	▼3.01
Rejected ballots		2	0.27	▼0.20
Conservative hold				
Conservative hold				

=== Campden ===
Campden (3)
Party	Candidate	Votes	%	±%
Conservative	Christopher Buckmaster	1,247	67.69	▼3.49
Conservative	Michael May	1,238		
Conservative	Rupert Cecil	1,223		
Liberal Democrats	Elizabeth Lindsay	309	16.21	▲5.50
Labour	Jane Armstrong	306	16.10	▼2.01
Liberal Democrats	Gary Hay	303		
Labour	Tanya Harrod	296		
Labour	Maeve Bhavan	280		
Liberal Democrats	Roberta Haseler	277		
Registered electors		4,903		▲94
Turnout		1,857	37.87	▼4.47
Rejected ballots		4	0.22	▼0.03
Conservative hold				
Conservative hold				
Conservative hold				

=== Cheyne ===
Cheyne (2)
Party	Candidate	Votes	%	±%
Conservative	Jonathan Wheeler*	1,042	71.01	▼0.81
Conservative	John Corbet-Singleton*	1,020		
Liberal Democrats	Valerie Chancellor	219	15.08	▲4.19
Liberal Democrats	Ralph Noyes	219		
Labour	Suky Macpherson	214	13.91	▼3.38
Labour	Hor Chan	190		
Registered electors		4,061		▲88
Turnout		1,504	39.50	▼2.18
Rejected ballots		3	0.20	▼0.16
Conservative hold				
Conservative hold				

=== Church ===
Church (2)
Party	Candidate	Votes	%	±%
Conservative	Richard Currie	756	59.18	▼8.99
Conservative	Adrian Fitzgerald*	751		
Labour	Jacob Tompkins	207	15.62	▼7.20
Labour	John Wootten	191		
Independent	Jag Judge	169	13.27	New
Liberal Democrats	Paul Presley	154	11.93	▲2.92
Liberal Democrats	Stephen Dawson	150		
Registered electors		3,165		▲68
Turnout		1,233	38.96	▼7.80
Rejected ballots		4	0.32	▲0.25
Conservative hold				
Conservative hold				

=== Colville ===
Colville (3)
Party	Candidate	Votes	%	±%
Labour	Robert Pope*	1,147	64.54	▼0.71
Labour	Patricia Healy*	1,118		
Labour	Joanna Edward*	1,109		
Conservative	Simon Allison	420	22.83	▲2.23
Conservative	Joanna Gardner	398		
Conservative	Nicola Cohen	375		
Liberal Democrats	Christine Ingham	237	12.62	▼2.86
Liberal Democrats	Priscilla Congreve	213		
Liberal Democrats	Patrick Mayers	211		
Registered electors		5,124		▼2
Turnout		1,896	37.00	▼6.48
Rejected ballots		4	0.21	▼0.24
Labour hold				
Labour hold				
Labour hold				

=== Courtfield ===
Courtfield (3)
Party	Candidate	Votes	%	±%
Conservative	Anthony Coates*	717	47.97	▲7.77
Conservative	Edward Cox*	690		
Conservative	Lawrence Holt*	688		
Liberal Democrats	Brian Orrell	656	43.16	▲15.38
Liberal Democrats	Caryl Harris	634		
Liberal Democrats	Rosemary Somers	593		
Labour	Hugh Raven	144	8.87	▼3.68
Labour	Christine Robson	125		
Labour	Charlotte Winer	119		
Registered electors		4,614		▲9
Turnout		1,510	32.73	▼11.24
Rejected ballots		10	0.66	▲0.41
Conservative hold				
Conservative hold				
Conservative hold				

=== Earls Court ===
Earls Court (3)
Party	Candidate	Votes	%	±%
Conservative	Barry Phelps	778	34.50	▼4.32
Conservative	Paul Warrick*	761		
Conservative	Thomas Fairhead	746		
Labour	Patricia Whitfield	700	30.10	▲9.22
Labour	Alastair Wood	664		
Liberal Democrats	John Drake	639	27.34	▲10.49
Labour	Dorian Jones	632		
Liberal Democrats	Vanessa Giles	630		
Liberal Democrats	Simon Hall	543		
Green	Niki Kortvelvessy	178	8.06	▼3.12
Registered electors		6,372		▲463
Turnout		2,210	34.68	▼2.62
Rejected ballots		6	0.27	▲0.09
Conservative hold				
Conservative hold				
Conservative hold				

=== Golborne ===
Golborne (3)
Party	Candidate	Votes	%	±%
Labour	Sarah Bonner* (Note: Bonner replaced Cllr Ann Bond after her resignation in 1992)	1,475	78.93	▲13.95
Labour	Bridget Hoier*	1,363		
Labour	Patrick Mason* (Note: Mason replaced Cllr Patrick Younge after his resignation in 1991)	1,354		
Conservative	Robert Freeman	234	11.58	▲3.11
Conservative	Alok Sharma	198		
Liberal Democrats	Catherine Aitchison	190	9.49	▲2.19
Conservative	Edward Vaizey	182		
Liberal Democrats	Ann Ahern	160		
Liberal Democrats	Rosemary Pettit	155		
Registered electors		4,998		▲312
Turnout		1,981	39.64	▼4.11
Rejected ballots		11	0.56	▲0.12
Labour hold				
Labour hold				
Labour hold				

=== Hans Towns ===
Hans Town (3)
Party	Candidate	Votes	%	±%
Conservative	Desmon Harney*	984	73.59	▼5.62
Conservative	Nicholas Paget-Brown*	979		
Conservative	Mary Weale	971		
Liberal Democrats	Simon Head	198	14.07	▲6.92
Liberal Democrats	Philip Gibbs	183		
Liberal Democrats	Angela Le Franc	179		
Labour	Michael Henry	172	12.34	▼1.30
Labour	Matilda Edelman	169		
Labour	Janet Thatcher	151		
Registered electors		4,196		▼195
Turnout		1,370	32.65	▼5.09
Rejected ballots		0	0.00	▼0.30
Conservative hold				
Conservative hold				
Conservative hold				

=== Holland ===
Holland (3)
Party	Candidate	Votes	%	±%
Conservative	Joan Hanham*	1,166	61.89	▼8.61
Conservative	Bryan Levitt*	1,109		
Conservative	Warwick Lightfoot*	1,091		
Labour	Jame Stuart-Smith	263	14.34	▼3.41
Labour	Leo Barraclough	260		
Labour	Francesca	256		
Residents	Rosemary Bello	252	12.52	New
Liberal Democrats	Ruth Russell	220	11.25	▲4.06
Liberal Democrats	David Bewley	204		
Residents	Peter Shasha	201		
Liberal Democrats	Hugh Venables	188		
Registered electors		4,844		▲99
Turnout		1,812	37.41	▼6.51
Rejected ballots		0	0.00	▼0.38
Conservative hold				
Conservative hold				
Conservative hold				

=== Kelfield ===
Kelfield (2)
Party	Candidate	Votes	%	±%
Labour	Stephen Hoier*	1,052	62.73	▼1.97
Labour	Keith Cunningham	1,031		
Conservative	Anthony Cross	386	22.70	▼2.06
Conservative	Alison Moore-Gwyn	368		
Liberal Democrats	Patricia Owen	253	14.57	▲4.03
Liberal Democrats	Ellen Moelly	230		
Registered electors		4,378		▼97
Turnout		1,761	40.22	▼5.46
Rejected ballots		6	0.34	Steady
Labour hold				
Labour hold				

=== Norland ===
Norland (2)
Party	Candidate	Votes	%	±%
Conservative	Ernest Tomlin*	879	62.46	▲4.21
Conservative	Brian Walker-Arnott*	855		
Labour	Jacqueline Thompson	289	20.10	▼3.51
Labour	Paul Krebs	269		
Liberal Democrats	Rose Hunt	257	17.44	▼0.69
Liberal Democrats	Gordon Ritchie	227		
Registered electors		3,212		Steady
Turnout		1,431	44.55	▼4.89
Rejected ballots		3	0.21	▼0.11
Conservative hold				
Conservative hold				

=== North Stanley ===
North Stanley (2)
Party	Candidate	Votes	%	±%
Conservative	Priscilla Frazer*	844	57.77	▼3.53
Conservative	Merrick Cockell*	806		
Labour	Michael Evans	320	19.89	▼8.91
Labour	Robert Mingay	247		
Liberal Democrats	Katerina Porter	247	14.71	▲4.81
Liberal Democrats	William Somers	173		
Green	Mary Attenborough	109	7.63	New
Registered electors		4,253		▲343
Turnout		1,437	33.79	▼10.99
Rejected ballots		0	0.00	▼0.63
Conservative hold				
Conservative hold				

=== Pembridge ===
Pembridge (3)
Party	Candidate	Votes	%	±%
Conservative	David Campion*	1,053	54.00	▲6.53
Conservative	Isobel Campbell*	1,049		
Conservative	Doreen Weatherhead*	1,036		
Labour	Stephen Daly	521	26.23	▼0.95
Labour	Marian Kearney	505		
Labour	Timothy Pullen	498		
Liberal Democrats	John Campbell	412	19.77	▲9.17
Liberal Democrats	Patrick Spencer	377		
Liberal Democrats	Katharine Hay	361		
Registered electors		5,094		▲48
Turnout		2,027	39.79	▼4.62
Rejected ballots		2	0.10	▼0.08
Conservative hold				
Conservative hold				
Conservative hold				

=== Queen's Gate ===
Queen's Gate (3)
Party	Candidate	Votes	%	±%
Conservative	Andrew Dalton	1,064	72.29	▼1.99
Conservative	Elizabeth Russell*	1,054		
Conservative	Daniel Moylan*	1,044		
Liberal Democrats	Margot James	224	15.16	▲3.91
Liberal Democrats	Colin Darracott	221		
Liberal Democrats	Dorothy Venables	218		
Labour	Ian Mackrill	191	12.55	▼2.22
Labour	Yvonne Hughes	180		
Labour	Patricia Fuller	179		
Registered electors		4,494		▼104
Turnout		1,492	33.20	▼5.84
Rejected ballots		2	0.13	▼0.09
Conservative hold				
Conservative hold				
Conservative hold				

=== Redcliffe ===
Redcliffe (3)
Party	Candidate	Votes	%	±%
Conservative	Frances Taylor*	733	41.22	▼22.63
Conservative	Patrick Gillford*	702		
Conservative	Alick Whitfield*	655		
Residents	Jonathan Hindle	592	33.59	New
Residents	Marylyn Coosner	574		
Residents	Charles Robinson	539		
Labour	Norma Morris	220	12.48	▼10.15
Labour	Dennis Fuller	219		
Labour	Stuart Shapro	193		
Liberal Democrats	Andrew Bellingall	156	7.87	▼5.64
Liberal Democrats	Barbara Woodthorpe-Browne	124		
Liberal Democrats	Diana Ritchie	120		
Green	Ajay Burlingham-Johnson	82	4.85	New
Registered electors		5,144		▲27
Turnout		1,722	33.48	▼3.71
Rejected ballots		1	0.06	▼0.31
Conservative hold				
Conservative hold				
Conservative hold				

=== Royal Hospital ===
Royal Hospital (2)
Party	Candidate	Votes	%	±%
Conservative	Ian Donaldson*	775	73.51	▼4.83
Conservative	Edward Hess*	728		
Liberal Democrats	Jean Thorp	156	14.66	▲4.26
Liberal Democrats	Carl Michel	143		
Labour	Alexander Pringle	134	11.83	▲0.57
Labour	John Rudkin	107		
Registered electors		3,170		▲17
Turnout		1,061	33.47	▼5.73
Rejected ballots		2	0.19	▲0.03
Conservative hold				
Conservative hold				

=== St Charles ===
St Charles (2)
Party	Candidate	Votes	%	±%
Labour	John Atkinson*	951	66.08	▼1.80
Labour	Rima Horton*	918		
Conservative	Peter Clark	358	23.75	▲1.58
Conservative	Pelham Walker	313		
Liberal Democrats	Alexandra Tatton-Brown	163	10.18	▲0.24
Liberal Democrats	Joe Tatton-Brown	124		
Registered electors		3,812		▼134
Turnout		1,511	39.64	▼4.40
Rejected ballots		1	0.07	▼0.22
Labour hold				
Labour hold				

=== South Stanley ===
South Stanley (2)
Party	Candidate	Votes	%	±%
Labour	Robert Weems*	1,048	59.79	▲6.76
Labour	Timothy Boulton*	1,044		
Conservative	Edwin Lloyd	533	30.07	▲0.26
Conservative	Timothy Tannock	517		
Liberal Democrats	Mary England	191	10.02	▲3.31
Liberal Democrats	David Osborn	159		
Registered electors		4,308		▲46
Turnout		1,857	43.11	▼1.63
Rejected ballots		3	0.16	▼0.16
Labour hold				
Labour hold				
