= Kensington and Bayswater =

UK Parliament constituency (since 2024)

- Borough constituency for the House of Commons
- Interactive map of boundaries from 2024
- Location within Greater London
- County: Greater London
- Electorate: 75,980 (March 2020)

Current constituency
- Created: 2024
- Member of Parliament: Joseph Powell (Labour)
- Seats: One
- Created from: Kensington, Cities of London and Westminster & Chelsea and Fulham

Kensington and Bayswater is a constituency in Greater London represented in the House of Commons of the UK Parliament. Created by the 2023 review of Westminster constituencies, it was first contested at the 2024 general election, when it was won by Joseph Powell of the Labour Party. The constituency name comes from the Central London areas of Kensington and Bayswater.

== Constituency profile ==
The Kensington and Bayswater constituency is located in Greater London, around 3 miles (4.8 km) west of the centre of London. It includes the areas of Kensington, Bayswater, Brompton, Earl's Court and Notting Hill. The constituency is densely-populated with many Georgian and Victorian townhouses. Kensington is highly affluent and features some of the most expensive properties in the country; the constituency's average house price is over £2 million, more than three times the London average and six times the national average. North Kensington, meanwhile, has high levels of deprivation and social housing. Notting Hill is a cosmopolitan and ethnically-diverse area known for its annual Caribbean carnival.

In general, residents of the constituency are young, very well-educated and likely to live in rented accommodation. They have high rates of household income, and a high proportion work in the accommodation, arts and technology sectors. White people made up 61% of residents at the 2021 census, a higher percentage than the rest of London. Around half of the White population were of non-British origin, including large American, Italian and French communities. Asians made up 13% of residents—many of Filipino origin—Black people were 8% and other ethnic groups were 11%. At the local borough council level, the constituency's affluent south is represented by Conservatives whilst the more deprived northern Kensington neighbourhoods elected Labour Party councillors. Voters overwhelmingly supported remaining in the European Union in the 2016 referendum, with an estimated 70% voting to remain compared the nationwide figure of 48%.

== Boundaries ==
The constituency is composed of the following electoral wards:

- The Royal Borough of Kensington and Chelsea wards of Abingdon, Brompton & Hans Town, Campden, Colville, Courtfield, Dalgarno, Earl's Court, Golborne, Holland, Norland, Notting Dale, Pembridge, Queen's Gate, and St Helen's.
- The City of Westminster wards of Bayswater and Lancaster Gate.

It covers nearly all the former constituency of Kensington, two wards primarily from the abolished Westminster North constituency, and the southern half of the Brompton & Hans Town ward, which was transferred from the Chelsea and Fulham constituency.

== Election results ==
=== Elections in the 2020s ===
General election 2024: Kensington and Bayswater
Party	Candidate	Votes	%	±%
Labour	Joseph Powell	17,025	40.6	+1.6
Conservative	Felicity Buchan	14,122	33.7	−4.6
Liberal Democrats	William Houngbo	2,910	6.9	−13.3
Green	Mona Adam	2,732	6.5	+5.1
Reform	Marc Burca	2,514	6.0	+5.2
Independent	Emma Dent Coad	1,824	4.4	N/A
Rejoin EU	John Stevens	486	1.2	N/A
Party of Women	Una O'Mahony	116	0.3	N/A
CPA	Roger Phillips	114	0.3	+0.2
Independent	Emperor of India Prince Ankit Love	65	0.2	N/A
Majority		2,903	6.9	+6.2
Turnout		41,908	54.2	−17.9
Registered electors		77,306		
Labour hold		Swing	+3.1	

=== Elections in the 2010s ===
2019 notional result
Party	Vote	%
Labour	21,394	39.0
Conservative	21,004	38.2
Liberal Democrats	11,048	20.2
Green	769	1.4
Brexit Party	453	0.8
Others	145	0.3
Turnout	54,813	72.1
Electorate	75,980	
