= 1990 Kensington and Chelsea London Borough Council election =

1990 local election in England

- 3 May 1990

All 54 council seats up for election to Kensington and Chelsea London Borough Council 28 seats needed for a majority
- Registered: 91,653
- Turnout: 38,693, 42.22%
	First party	Second party	Third party
Party	Conservative	Labour	Liberal Democrats
Seats won	39	15	0
Seat change	Steady	Steady	Steady
Popular vote	48,502	31,939	10,248
Percentage	51.83%	34.13%	10.95%
Council control before election
Conservative
Council control after election
Conservative

The 1990 Kensington and Chelsea Council election took place on 3 May 1990 to elect members of Kensington and Chelsea London Borough Council in London, England. The whole council was up for election and the Conservative party stayed in overall control of the council.

== Election result ==
1990 Kensington and Chelsea London Borough elections
Party	Seats	Gains	Losses	Net gain/loss	Seats %	Votes %	Votes	+/−
Conservative	39	0	0	Steady	72.22	51.83	48,502	
Labour	15	0	0	Steady	27.78	34.13	31,939	
Liberal Democrats	0	0	0	Steady	0.00	10.95	10,248	
Green	0	0	0	Steady	0.00	1.50	1,406	
ICP	0	0	0	Steady	0.00	0.57	533	
SDP	0	0	0	Steady	0.00	0.38	352	
RAP	0	0	0	Steady	0.00	0.25	237	
Communist	0	0	0	Steady	0.00	0.21	198	
Independent	0	0	0	Steady	0.00	0.10	95	
Corrective Party	0	0	0	Steady	0.00	0.08	79	
Total	54						93,589	

== Ward results ==
(*) - Indicates an incumbent candidate

(†) - Indicates an incumbent candidate standing in a different ward

=== Abingdon ===
Abingdon (3)
Party	Candidate	Votes	%
Conservative	Elizabeth Christmas*	1,258	65.49
Conservative	William Carver	1,241	
Conservative	Jonathan Munday*	1,168	
Labour	Hussain Haider	261	13.45
Labour	Edwin Passes	260	
Labour	Reginald Pearce	232	
Liberal Democrats	Jeremy Good	215	10.29
Liberal Democrats	Donald Fair	211	
Green	Harold Heckle	201	10.77
Liberal Democrats	George Minto	150	
Registered electors		4,930	
Turnout		1,870	37.93
Rejected ballots		2	0.11
Conservative hold			
Conservative hold			
Conservative hold			

=== Avondale ===
Avondale (3)
Party	Candidate	Votes	%
Labour	Benjamin Bousquet*	1,540	65.95
Labour	Jennifer Forsyth*	1,378	
Labour	Hugh Raven	1,312	
Conservative	John Boden	543	23.81
Conservative	Matthew Palmer	507	
Conservative	Anthony Johnson	476	
Liberal Democrats	Susan Wright	219	10.24
Registered electors		5,091	
Turnout		2,381	46.77
Rejected ballots		6	0.25
Labour hold			
Labour hold			
Labour hold			

=== Brompton ===
Brompton (2)
Party	Candidate	Votes	%
Conservative	David Hudson*	606	72.66
Conservative	Simon Ingham	557	
Labour	Mary Blanchet	125	15.23
Labour	Matilda Edelman	118	
Liberal Democrats	Stephen Gould	99	12.11
Liberal Democrats	Rosemary Somers	95	
Registered electors		2,572	
Turnout		850	33.05
Rejected ballots		4	0.47
Conservative hold			
Conservative hold			

=== Campden ===
Campden (3)
Party	Candidate	Votes	%
Conservative	Richard Briance	1,401	71.18
Conservative	Yvonne Constance	1,365	
Conservative	Primrose Palmer	1,362	
Labour	Jane Armstrong	361	18.11
Labour	Tanya Harrod	359	
Labour	Clifford Simmons	329	
Liberal Democrats	Philip Anderson	223	10.71
Liberal Democrats	James Crichton-Miller	209	
Liberal Democrats	Doreen Gorsky	190	
Registered electors		4,809	
Turnout		2,036	42.34
Rejected ballots		5	0.25
Conservative hold			
Conservative hold			
Conservative hold			

=== Cheyne ===
Cheyne (2)
Party	Candidate	Votes	%
Conservative	John Corbet-Singleton	1,135	71.82
Conservative	Jonathan Wheeler*	1,132	
Labour	Paul Marsh	282	17.29
Labour	Peter Harvey	263	
Liberal Democrats	Graham Muir	181	10.89
Liberal Democrats	Paul Smales	163	
Registered electors		3,973	
Turnout		1,656	41.68
Rejected ballots		6	0.36
Conservative hold			
Conservative hold			

=== Church ===
Church (2)
Party	Candidate	Votes	%
Conservative	Jean Craig	943	68.17
Conservative	Adrian Fitzgerald*	902	
Labour	John Keys	323	22.82
Labour	Dennis Fuller	295	
Liberal Democrats	William Somers	141	9.01
Liberal Democrats	Yousuf Ali	102	
Registered electors		3,097	
Turnout		1,448	46.76
Rejected ballots		1	0.07
Conservative hold			
Conservative hold			

=== Colville ===
Colville (3)
Party	Candidate	Votes	%
Labour	Robert Pope*	1,423	65.25
Labour	Joanna Edward	1,396	
Labour	Patricia Healy	1,373	
Conservative	Pamela Davies	476	20.60
Conservative	Edward Hutley	436	
Conservative	Andrew Sutcliffe	410	
Liberal Democrats	Gordon Ritchie	209	9.76
Communist	Brian Nicholls	94	4.39
Registered electors		5,126	
Turnout		2,229	43.48
Rejected ballots		10	0.45
Labour hold			
Labour hold			
Labour hold			

=== Courtfield ===
Courtfield (3)
Party	Candidate	Votes	%
Conservative	Anthony Coates^{†} (Note: Coates was a sitting councillor representing the Pembridge ward)	880	40.20
Conservative	Edward Cox*	855	
Conservative	Andrew Fane* (Note: Fane replaced Cllr James Arbuthnot after his resignation in 1987)	830	
Lib Dem Focus Team	Susan Broidy	627	27.78
Lib Dem Focus Team	Brian Orrell	627	
Lib Dem Focus Team	Christopher Ramsay-Horler	519	
ICP	Kenneth Young	279	12.55
ICP	Paula Young	254	
Labour	Caraline S. Brown	189	8.18
Green	William Charlton	185	8.70
Labour	Stephan Burke	182	
Labour	Vivienne Robb	151	
RAP	Kazimierz Przedmoyski	55	2.59
Registered electors		4,605	
Turnout		2,025	43.97
Rejected ballots		5	0.25
Conservative hold			
Conservative hold			
Conservative hold			

=== Earls Court ===
Earls Court (3)
Party	Candidate	Votes	%
Conservative	Laurence Kenny*	978	38.82
Conservative	John Bender	906	
Conservative	Paul Warrick*	887	
Labour	MartinGreen	524	20.88
Labour	Suky J. Macpherson	515	
Labour	Barry Sharman	451	
Lib Dem Focus Team	John Drake	431	16.85
Lib Dem Focus Team	Vanessa G. Giles	408	
Lib Dem Focus Team	Andrew Shepherd	365	
Green	Eniko Kortvelyessy	266	11.18
RAP	Elcie Montagu	182	7.65
SDP	David Hyde	88	3.53
SDP	John Martin	80	
Corrective Party	Christine Ellis	31	1.09
Corrective Party	Lindi St Clair	31	
Corrective Party	Marilyn Fawcett	17	
Registered electors		5,909	
Turnout		2,204	37.30
Rejected ballots		4	0.18
Conservative hold			
Conservative hold			
Conservative hold			

=== Goldborne ===
Golborne (3)
Party	Candidate	Votes	%
Labour	Ann Bond* (Note: Bond replaced Cllr Patrick Allen-Smyth after his resignation in 1989)	1,599	64.98
Labour	Bridget Hoier	1,387	
Labour	Patrick Younge	1,317	
Green	Nicola Easton	226	10.24
Conservative	Olaf Clayton	198	8.47
Conservative	Nicholas Hurd	184	
Conservative	Justin Grant-Duff	178	
Liberal Democrats	James Barnett	161	7.30
Communist	Edward Adams	104	4.71
Independent	Len Green	95	4.30
Registered electors		4,686	
Turnout		2,050	43.75
Rejected ballots		7	0.34
Labour hold			
Labour hold			
Labour hold			

=== Hans Town ===
Hans Town (3)
Party	Candidate	Votes	%
Conservative	Mary Glyn* (Note: Glyn replaced Cllr. Muriel Gumbel after her death in 1987)	1,224	79.21
Conservative	Nicholas Paget-Brown*	1,219	
Conservative	Desmon Harney*	1,213	
Labour	Leslie Pain	220	13.64
Labour	Anthony Price	214	
Labour	Victor Schonfield	197	
Liberal Democrats	Thomas Drabble	119	7.15
Liberal Democrats	Angela Le Franc	116	
Liberal Democrats	Hannah Ali	94	
Registered electors		4,391	
Turnout		1,657	37.74
Rejected ballots		5	0.30
Conservative hold			
Conservative hold			
Conservative hold			

=== Holland ===
Holland (3)
Party	Candidate	Votes	%
Conservative	Joan Hanham*	1,458	70.50
Conservative	Bryan Levitt*	1,412	
Conservative	Warwick Lightfoot*	1,396	
Labour	Roger Dunn	381	17.75
Labour	Leopold Barraclough	364	
Labour	David Holland	330	
Liberal Democrats	Robert Boddington	153	7.19
Liberal Democrats	Henry Pryor	143	
Liberal Democrats	Hugh Venables	140	
SDP	Thomas Heron	98	4.56
SDP	Caiphas Chambati	86	
Registered electors		4,745	
Turnout		2,084	43.92
Rejected ballots		8	0.38
Conservative hold			
Conservative hold			
Conservative hold			

=== Kelfield ===
Kelfield (2)
Party	Candidate	Votes	%
Labour	Stephen Hoier*	1,273	64.70
Labour	David Spry	1,156	
Conservative	Sheila Robertson	501	24.76
Conservative	Desmond Swayne	428	
Liberal Democrats	Patricia Owen	211	10.54
Liberal Democrats	Irene Watson	185	
Registered electors		4,475	
Turnout		2,044	45.68
Rejected ballots		7	0.34
Labour hold			
Labour hold			

=== Norland ===
Norland (2)
Party	Candidate	Votes	%
Conservative	Ernest Tomlin*	902	58.25
Conservative	Brian Walker-Arnott*	883	
Labour	Barbara Atkinson	374	23.61
Labour	Roger Fuller	350	
Liberal Democrats	Rose Hunt	296	18.13
Liberal Democrats	Christopher Shirley	259	
Registered electors		3,212	
Turnout		1,588	49.44
Rejected ballots		5	0.32
Conservative hold			
Conservative hold			

=== North Stanley ===
North Stanley (2)
Party	Candidate	Votes	%
Conservative	Priscilla Frazer	1,012	61.30
Conservative	Merrick Cockell*	1,005	
Labour	Michael Evans	509	28.80
Labour	Rena Valeh	439	
Liberal Democrats	Eben Phillips	171	9.90
Liberal Democrats	Paul Omar	154	
Registered electors		3,910	
Turnout		1,751	44.78
Rejected ballots		11	0.63
Conservative hold			
Conservative hold			

=== Pembridge ===
Pembridge (3)
Party	Candidate	Votes	%
Conservative	Isobel Campbell	1,122	47.47
Conservative	David Campton*	1,089	
Conservative	Doreen Weatherhead*	1,053	
Labour	Stephen Daly	643	27.18
Labour	Marian Kearney	631	
Labour	Richard Hawkins	595	
Green	Ajay Burlingham-Johnson	338	14.75
Liberal Democrats	John Campbell	281	10.60
Liberal Democrats	Sian Roberts	240	
Liberal Democrats	Patrick Spencer	209	
Registered electors		5,046	
Turnout		2,241	44.41
Rejected ballots		4	0.18
Conservative hold			
Conservative hold			
Conservative hold			

=== Queen's Gate ===
Queen's Gate (3)
Party	Candidate	Votes	%
Conservative	Timothy Coleridge*	1,307	74.28
Conservative	Elizabeth Russell*	1,250	
Conservative	Daniel Moylan	1,246	
Labour	Sean Keeley	259	14.47
Labour	Richard Jordan	242	
Labour	Ian Mackrill	241	
Liberal Democrats	Stephen Dawson	197	11.25
Liberal Democrats	Robert Rott	191	
Liberal Democrats	Dorothy Venables	187	
Registered electors		4,598	
Turnout		1,795	39.04
Rejected ballots		4	0.22
Conservative hold			
Conservative hold			
Conservative hold			

=== Redcliffe ===
Redcliffe (3)
Party	Candidate	Votes	%
Conservative	Frances Taylor^{†} (Note: Taylor was a sitting councillor representing Campden ward)	1,147	63.85
Conservative	Patrick Gillford	1,125	
Conservative	Alick Whitfield	1,088	
Labour	Patricia Fuller	409	22.63
Labour	Andrew Dawson	397	
Labour	Alexander Pringle	386	
Liberal Democrats	Katerina Porter	245	13.51
Liberal Democrats	Robert Woodthorpe-Browne	234	
Liberal Democrats	Leslie Macdonald-Weissenborn	233	
Registered electors		5,117	
Turnout		1,903	37.19
Rejected ballots		7	0.37
Conservative hold			
Conservative hold			
Conservative hold			

=== Royal Hospital ===
Royal Hospital (2)
Party	Candidate	Votes	%
Conservative	Ian Donaldson	928	78.34
Conservative	Edward Hess* (Note: Hess replaced Cllr Christopher Nickols after his death in 1988)	880	
Labour	Keith Cunningham	143	11.26
Liberal Democrats	Penelope Pocock	123	10.40
Liberal Democrats	Edna McGregor	117	
Labour	Natalie Pringle	117	
Registered electors		3,153	
Turnout		1,236	39.20
Rejected ballots		2	0.16
Conservative hold			
Conservative hold			

=== St Charles ===
St Charles (2)
Party	Candidate	Votes	%
Labour	John Atkinson^{†} (Note: Atkinson was a sitting councillor representing the South Stanley ward, after replacing Cllr Neil Kearney following his resignation in 1988)	1,115	67.88
Labour	Rima Horton*	1,082	
Conservative	Lynne Bishop	379	22.17
Conservative	Moira Swayne	338	
Liberal Democrats	Joe Tatton-Brown	161	9.94
Registered electors		3,946	
Turnout		1,738	44.04
Rejected ballots		5	0.29
Labour hold			
Labour hold			

=== South Stanley ===
South Stanley (2)
Party	Candidate	Votes	%
Labour	Timothy Boulton*	1,042	53.03
Labour	Robert Weems	885	
Conservative	Nicholas Millard	552	29.81
Conservative	Paul Jones	531	
Green	Elizabeth Raven-Hill	190	10.45
Liberal Democrats	Mary England	145	6.71
Liberal Democrats	Panayiotis Vardakis	99	
Registered electors		4,262	
Turnout		1,907	44.74
Rejected ballots		6	0.32
Labour hold			
Labour hold			
