= Kensington and Chelsea London Borough Council elections =

Local elections in London, England

A map showing the wards of Kensington and Chelsea from 2002–2014

Kensington and Chelsea London Borough Council in London, England, is elected every four years. Since the last boundary changes in 2014, 50 councillors have been elected from 18 wards.

== Council elections ==
Year	Conservative	Labour	Liberal Democrats (Note: Liberal Party, 1964–1978; SDP–Liberal Alliance, 1982–1986)	Golborne Community Hundred	Council control after election
1964	46	14	0	—	Conservative
1968	57	3	0	—	Conservative
1971	39	21	0	—	Conservative
1974 (Note: Boundary changes increased the number of seats by one.)	45	16	0	—	Conservative
1978 (Note: Boundary changes reduced the number of seats by seven.)	39	13	0	2	Conservative
1982	39	15	0	—	Conservative
1986	39	15	0	—	Conservative
1990	39	15	0	—	Conservative
1994 (Note: Boundary changes took place but the number of seats remained the same. (Note: The Kensington and Chelsea and Westminster (London Borough Boundaries) Order 1993) (Note: The North and Central London (London Borough Boundaries) Order 1993))	39	15	0	—	Conservative
1998 (Note: Boundary changes took place but the number of seats remained the same. (Note: The Kensington and Chelsea and Hammersmith and Fulham (London Borough Boundaries) Order 1995))	39	15	0	—	Conservative
2002 (Note: Boundary changes took place but the number of seats remained the same.)	42	12	0	—	Conservative
2006	45	9	0	—	Conservative
2010	43	9	2	—	Conservative
2014 (Note: Boundary changes reduced the number of seats by four.)	37	12	1	—	Conservative
2018	36	13	1	—	Conservative
2022	35	13	2	—	Conservative
2026	34	13	3	—	Conservative

== Borough result maps ==
2002 results map

2006 results map

2010 results map

2014 results map

2018 results map

2022 results map

2026 results map

== By-election results ==
=== 1964–1968 ===
There were no by-elections.

=== 1968–1971 ===
Redcliffe by-election, 1 May 1969
Party	Candidate	Votes	%	±%
Conservative	R. H. C. Gresty	1697		
Labour	C. Bradley	195		
Turnout			11.9%	

South Stanley by-election, 19 March 1970
Party	Candidate	Votes	%	±%
Labour	E. L. P. Seers	792		
Conservative	A. J. A. D. Fitzgerald	630		
Independent Ratepayers & Tenants	J. A. Dutch	414		
Turnout			34.9%	

Holland by-election, 24 September 1970
Party	Candidate	Votes	%	±%
Conservative	J. B. Hanham	1545		
Liberal	L. Spicer	472		
Labour	G. A. Colerick	194		
Turnout			13.8%	

=== 1971–1974 ===
St Charles by-election, 8 July 1971
Party	Candidate	Votes	%	±%
Labour	D. H. Lewis	1,499		
Conservative	E. P. Tomlin	494		
Liberal	I. Watson	149		
Communist	H. B. Collins	55		
Turnout			17.2%	

Norland by-election, 7 June 1973
Party	Candidate	Votes	%	±%
Labour	D. J. Scott	1,350		
Conservative	M. A. K. Cocks	962		
Liberal	P. Russell Scott	383		
Communist	M. B. Baxter	53		
Turnout			31.4%	

St Charles by-election, 7 June 1973
Party	Candidate	Votes	%	±%
Labour	A. T. Finch	1,450		
Conservative	S. A. O'Callaghan	416		
Liberal	F. Walker	344		
Turnout			17.9%	

=== 1974–1978 ===
Golborne by-election, 11 July 1974
Party	Candidate	Votes	%	±%
Labour	Patricia M. L. Webster	668		
Conservative	David P. H. Amory	184		
Liberal	Richard G. Pierce	66		
Independent	Edouard P. D'Aubreys	33		
Independent Labour	Edgar Rennie	19		
Save London Action Group	Derek A. A. Kersey	10		
Turnout			16.0	

Abingdon by-election, 30 October 1975
Party	Candidate	Votes	%	±%
Conservative	Antony M. Carr-Gomm	873		
Liberal	Jennifer M. Ware	373		
Save London Action Group	Patrick B. Horsley	137		
Labour	Gillian Ryall	96		
Turnout			25.9	

Golborne by-election, 30 October 1975
Party	Candidate	Votes	%	±%
Labour	Arthur J. Thomas	713		
Conservative	Paul S. Serfaty	236		
Independent	Edouard P. D'Aubreys	78		
Save London Action Group	Eizabeth J. Dallas-Ross	12		
Turnout			17.5	

=== 1990–1994 ===
Golborne by-election, 20 June 1991
Party	Candidate	Votes	%	±%
Labour	Patrick Mason	946	76.5	
Conservative	Paul J. Jones	164	13.3	
Liberal Democrats	Adam J. Weitzman	127	10.3	
Turnout			27.7	
Labour hold		Swing		

The by-election was called following the resignation of Cllr Patrick Younge.

Golborne by-election, 18 June 1992
Party	Candidate	Votes	%	±%
Labour	Sarah C. Bonner	657	70.0	
Conservative	Rupert L. A. Cecil	172	18.3	
Liberal Democrats	Adam J. Weitzman	78	8.3	
Green	Ajay Burlingham-Johnson	32	3.4	
Turnout			20.8	
Labour hold		Swing		

The by-election was called following the resignation of Cllr Ann Bond.

Avondale by-election, 17 September 1992
Party	Candidate	Votes	%	±%
Labour	Allah Y. M. Lasharie	471	55.2	
Conservative	Richard J. Mayson	311	36.4	
Liberal Democrats	Robert C. H. Boddington	72	8.4	
Turnout			18.0	
Labour hold		Swing		

The by-election was called following the resignation of Cllr Benjamin Bousquet.

=== 1994–1998 ===
South Stanley by-election, 4 May 1995
Party	Candidate	Votes	%	±%
Labour	Alastair G. T. Wood	917		
Conservative	Edwin Lloyd	459		
Independent	George P. Oliver	86		
Liberal Democrats	Mary England	78		
Turnout				
Labour hold		Swing		

The by-election was called following the resignation of Cllr Robert Weems.

Queen's Gate by-election, 2 May 1996
Party	Candidate	Votes	%	±%
Conservative	Gary Mond	848		
Liberal Democrats	Alexandra D. Jones	302		
Labour	Jane Armstrong	197		
Turnout				
Conservative hold		Swing		

The by-election was called following the death of Cllr Elizabeth Russell.

=== 1998–2002 ===
Earls Court by-election, 4 May 2000
Party	Candidate	Votes	%	±%
Conservative	Terence M. Buxton	885	43.1	+3.6
Labour	Caroline Ellis	530	25.8	−3.0
Liberal Democrats	John G. Drake	460	22.4	+0.9
Independent	Malcolm D. Spalding	177	8.6	−1.6
Majority		355	17.3	
Turnout		2,052	28.7	
Conservative hold		Swing		

The by-election was called following the resignation of Cllr Timothy Tannock.

=== 2002–2006 ===
There were no by-elections.

=== 2006–2010 ===
Brompton by-election, 1 May 2008
Party	Candidate	Votes	%	±%
Conservative	Quentin N. J. Marshall	1,748	76.4	−0.9
Liberal Democrats	Stephen Kingsley	326	14.3	+2.3
Labour	Christabel B. Gurney	213	9.3	−1.3
Majority		1,422	62.1	
Turnout		2,287	39.8	
Conservative hold		Swing		

The by-election was called following the resignation of Cllr Margot James.

Colville by-election, 22 July 2009
Party	Candidate	Votes	%	±%
Liberal Democrats	Carol Caruana	634	46.9	+16.8
Conservative	Samia Betayeb	330	24.4	+3.2
Labour	Amir Akhrif	300	22.2	−19.2
Green	Melan Ebrahimi-Fardouee	77	5.7	−1.5
Independent	Elsa Chagas	10	0.7	+0.7
Majority		304	22.5	
Turnout		1,351	24.0	
Liberal Democrats gain from Labour		Swing		

The by-election was called following the resignation of Cllr Marianne Alapini.

=== 2010–2014 ===
Holland by-election, 22 July 2010
Party	Candidate	Votes	%	±%
Conservative	Rock Feilding-Mellen	649	75.0	+17.0
Liberal Democrats	Martin Wilson	146	16.9	−4.8
UKIP	Bruce Machan	70	8.1	N/A
Majority		503	58.2	
Turnout		865	14.0	
Conservative hold		Swing		

The by-election was called following the resignation of Cllr Joan Hanham.

Cremorne by-election, 16 September 2010
Party	Candidate	Votes	%	±%
Conservative	Gerard Hargreaves	602	41.2	−10.2
Labour	Mabel McKeown	583	39.9	+15.6
Liberal Democrats	Peter Kosta	180	12.3	−10.8
Green	Julia Stephenson	51	3.5	N/A
UKIP	David Coburn	49	3.1	−2.1
Majority		19	1.3	
Turnout		1,462	24.9	
Conservative hold		Swing		

The by-election was called following the resignation of Cllr Mark Daley.

Earls Court by-election, 16 September 2010
Party	Candidate	Votes	%	±%
Liberal Democrats	Linda Wade	703	44.8	+24.1
Conservative	Malcolm Spalding	594	37.8	−12.5
Labour	Joel Bishop	151	9.6	−11.5
Independent	Elizabeth Arbuthnot	49	3.1	N/A
Independent	Jack Bovill	29	1.8	N/A
Green	Michael Enright	26	1.7	−8.5
UKIP	Richard Bridgeman	20	1.1	N/A
Majority		109	6.9	
Turnout		1,570	24.0	
Liberal Democrats gain from Conservative		Swing		

The by-election was called following the resignation of Cllr Barry Phelps.

Brompton by-election, 9 June 2011
Party	Candidate	Votes	%	±%
Conservative	Louis Mosley	1,975	91.9	+26.1
Labour	Mark D. Sautter	89	4.1	−8.9
Liberal Democrats	Mary T. L. Harris	86	4.0	−15.2
Majority		1,886	87.8	
Turnout		2,150		
Conservative hold		Swing		

The by-election was called following the death of Cllr Iain Hanham.

Queen's Gate by-election, 9 June 2011
Party	Candidate	Votes	%	±%
Conservative	Sam Mackover	663	71.7	+5.7
Liberal Democrats	John Blamey	100	10.8	−6.2
Labour	Keith Stirling	82	8.9	−1.9
UKIP	David Coburn	80	8.6	N/A
Majority		563	60.9	
Turnout		925		
Conservative hold		Swing		

The by-election was called following the death of Cllr Andrew Dalton.

Norland by-election, 6 October 2011
Party	Candidate	Votes	%	±%
Conservative	Catherine Faulks	675	43.8	−10.9
Labour	Beinazir Lasharie	438	28.4	+5.3
Liberal Democrats	Peter Kosta	358	23.2	+2.2
UKIP	Peter Stringfellow	70	4.5	N/A
Majority		237	15.4	
Turnout		1,540	24	
Conservative hold		Swing		

The by-election was called following the resignation of Cllr Andrew Lamont.

Brompton by-election, 28 June 2012
Party	Candidate	Votes	%	±%
Conservative	Abbas Barkhordar	650	70.3	+3.7
Labour	Mark Sautter	103	11.1	−1.9
Liberal Democrats	Moya Denman	101	10.9	−8.3
UKIP	Raheem Kassam	71	7.7	N/A
Majority		547	59.2	
Turnout		925		
Conservative hold		Swing		

The by-election was called following the death of Cllr Shireen Ritchie.

=== 2014–2018 ===
Stanley by-election, 7 May 2015
Party	Candidate	Votes	%	±%
Conservative	Kim Taylor-Smith	2,349	69.4	
Labour	Isabel Grace	693	20.5	
Independent	Ian Henderson	343	10.1	
Majority		1,656	48.9	
Turnout		3,385	52.3	
Conservative hold		Swing		

The by-election was called following the resignation of Cllr Merrick Cockell.

Abingdon by-election, 5 May 2016 (2 seats)
Party	Candidate	Votes	%	±%
Conservative	Sarah Addenbrooke	1,716		
Conservative	Anne Cyron	1,470		
Labour	Benjamin Fernando	395		
Labour	Nigel Wilkins	298		
Liberal Democrats	Jeremy Good	220		
Liberal Democrats	Jonathan Owen	210		
UKIP	Richard Braine	85		
UKIP	Jack Bovill	76		
Majority		1,075		
Turnout			46.4	
Conservative hold		Swing		
Conservative hold		Swing		

The by-election was called following the resignations of Cllrs Victoria Borwick MP and Joanna Gardner.

=== 2018–2022 ===
Dalgarno by-election, 21 March 2019
Party	Candidate	Votes	%	±%
Labour	Kasim Ali	719	55.4	−15.0
Conservative	Samia Bentayeb	306	23.6	+1.6
Liberal Democrats	Alexandra Tatton-Brown	145	11.2	+3.5
UKIP	Callum Hutton	68	5.2	+5.2
Green	Angela Georgievski	61	4.7	+4.7
Majority		413	31.8	
Turnout		1,299		
Labour hold		Swing		

The by-election was called following the resignation of Cllr Robert Thompson.

=== 2022–2026 ===
Norland by-election, 2 May 2024
Party	Candidate	Votes	%	±%
Conservative	Stéphanie Petit	902	51.0	
Labour	Monica Press	514	29.1	
Liberal Democrats	Finlay Dargan	229	13.0	
Green	Heloise Hunter	123	7.0	
Majority		388	22.0	
Turnout		1,768	46.2	
Conservative hold		Swing		

The by-election was called following the resignation of Cllr Stuart Graham.
