= Brompton (ward) =

Electoral division in London

- Former electoral ward for the Kensington and Chelsea London Borough Council
- Brompton ward boundaries from 2002 to 2014
- Borough: Kensington and Chelsea
- County: Greater London

Former electoral ward
- Created: 1965
- Abolished: 2014
- Replaced by: Brompton and Hans Town; Courtfield; Stanley
- ONS code: 00AWFZ
- GSS code: E05000383

Brompton was an electoral ward in the Royal Borough of Kensington and Chelsea from 1965 to 2014. The ward was first used in the 1964 elections and last used for the 2010 elections, with by-elections in 2011 and 2012. It returned councillors to Kensington and Chelsea London Borough Council.

== 2002–2014 Kensington and Chelsea council elections ==
=== 2012 by-election ===
The by-election took place on 28 June 2012, following the death of Shireen Ritchie.

2012 Brompton by-election
Party	Candidate	Votes	%	±%
Conservative	Abbas Barkhordar	650	70.3	+3.7
Labour	Mark Sautter	103	11.1	−1.9
Liberal Democrats	Moya Denman	101	10.9	−8.3
UKIP	Raheem Kassam	71	7.7	N/A
Majority		547	59.2	
Turnout		925		
Conservative hold		Swing		

=== 2011 by-election ===
The by-election took place on 9 June 2011, following the death of Iain Hanham.

2011 Brompton by-election
Party	Candidate	Votes	%	±%
Conservative	Louis Mosley	1,975	91.9	+26.1
Labour	Mark Sautter	89	4.1	−8.9
Liberal Democrats	Mary Harris	86	4.0	−15.2
Majority		1,886	87.8	
Turnout		2,150		
Conservative hold		Swing		

=== 2010 election ===
The election on 6 May 2010 took place on the same day as the United Kingdom general election.

2010 Kensington and Chelsea London Borough Council election: Brompton
Party	Candidate	Votes	%	±%
Conservative	Shireen Ritchie	1,567	66.6	
Conservative	Iain Hanham	1,548	65.8	
Conservative	Quentin Marshall	1,523	64.7	
Liberal Democrats	Mary Harris	452	19.2	
Liberal Democrats	Ann Coxon	410	17.4	
Labour	Martin Green	307	13.0	
Labour	Susie Parsons	282	12.0	
Labour	Daver Perry	214	9.1	
Turnout		2,353	39.9	
Conservative hold		Swing		
Conservative hold		Swing		
Conservative hold		Swing		

=== 2008 by-election ===
The by-election took place on 1 May 2008, following the resignation of Margot James.

2008 Brompton by-election
Party	Candidate	Votes	%	±%
Conservative	Quentin Marshall	1,748	76.4	−0.9
Liberal Democrats	Stephen Kingsley	326	14.3	+2.3
Labour	Christabel Gurney	213	9.3	−1.3
Majority		1,422	62.1	
Turnout		2,287	39.8	
Conservative hold		Swing		

=== 2006 election ===
The election took place on 4 May 2006.

2006 Kensington and Chelsea London Borough Council election: Brompton
Party	Candidate	Votes	%	±%
Conservative	Margot James	1,136	77.3	
Conservative	Iain Hanham	1,121		
Conservative	Shireen Ritchie	1,116		
Liberal Democrats	Stephen Kingsley	177	12.0	
Liberal Democrats	Rosamund Pease	170		
Labour	Caroline Tod	156	10.6	
Labour	Alexander Case	132		
Labour	Mark Twigg	121		
Turnout		4,129	23.8	−3.8
Conservative hold		Swing		
Conservative hold		Swing		
Conservative hold		Swing		

=== 2002 election ===
The election took place on 2 May 2002.

2002 Kensington and Chelsea London Borough Council election: Brompton
Party	Candidate	Votes	%	±%
Conservative	David Harland	970		
Conservative	Shireen Ritchie	966		
Conservative	Iain Hanham	948		
Labour	Bernard Hamilton	192		
Liberal Democrats	Brian Orrell	177		
Liberal Democrats	Rosamund Pease	176		
Labour	David Macfarlane	166		
Labour	Dave Perry	159		
Liberal Democrats	William Somers	146		
Turnout		3,900	27.6	
Conservative win (new boundaries)				
Conservative win (new boundaries)				
Conservative win (new boundaries)				

== 1978–2002 Kensington and Chelsea council elections ==
Brompton ward boundaries from 1978 to 2002

=== 1998 election ===
The election on 7 May 1998 took place on the same day as the 1998 Greater London Authority referendum.

1998 Kensington and Chelsea London Borough Council election: Brompton
Party	Candidate	Votes	%	±%
Conservative	David Hudson	474	69.29	▲0.62
Conservative	Shireen Ritchie	440		
Labour	John Manning	107	16.15	▲2.74
Labour	Deirdre O'Day	106		
Liberal Democrats	Julian England	105	14.56	▼3.36
Liberal Democrats	Diana Tupper	87		
Registered electors		2,839		▲332
Turnout		702	24.73	▼5.31
Rejected ballots		8	1.14	▲0.87
Conservative hold		Swing		
Conservative hold		Swing		

=== 1994 election ===
The election took place on 5 May 1994.

1994 Kensington and Chelsea London Borough Council election: Brompton
Party	Candidate	Votes	%	±%
Conservative	David Hudson	515	68.67	▼3.99
Conservative	Simon Ingham	489		
Liberal Democrats	Stephen Gould	135	17.92	▲5.81
Liberal Democrats	Robert Woodthorpe-Brown	126		
Labour	Simon Stanley	102	13.41	▼1.82
Labour	Richard Tyson	93		
Registered electors		2,507		▼65
Turnout		753	30.04	▼3.01
Rejected ballots		2	0.27	▼0.20
Conservative hold		Swing		
Conservative hold		Swing		

=== 1990 election ===
The election took place on 3 May 1990.

1990 Kensington and Chelsea London Borough Council election: Brompton
Party	Candidate	Votes	%	±%
Conservative	David Hudson	606	72.66	
Conservative	Simon Ingham	557		
Labour	Mary Blanchet	125	15.23	
Labour	Matilda Edelman	118		
Liberal Democrats	Stephen Gould	99	12.11	
Liberal Democrats	Rosemary Somers	95		
Registered electors		2,572		
Turnout		850	33.05	
Rejected ballots		4	0.47	
Conservative hold		Swing		
Conservative hold		Swing		

=== 1986 election ===
The election took place on 8 May 1986.

1986 Kensington and Chelsea London Borough Council election: Brompton
Party	Candidate	Votes	%	±%
Conservative	David Hudson	640		
Conservative	Melinda Libby	593		
Alliance	John Howard	139		
Alliance	Cyril Kinsky	112		
Labour	Philip Clayton	58		
Labour	Edward Beier	54		
Green	John Slater	27		
Turnout			33.6	
Conservative hold		Swing		
Conservative hold		Swing		

=== 1982 election ===
The election took place on 6 May 1982.

=== 1978 election ===
The election took place on 4 May 1978.

== 1964–1978 Kensington and Chelsea council elections ==
=== 1974 election ===
The election took place on 2 May 1974.

=== 1971 election ===
The election took place on 13 May 1971.

=== 1968 election ===
The election took place on 9 May 1968.

=== 1964 election ===
The election took place on 7 May 1964.
