= Courtfield =

Courtfield may refer to:

- Courtfield, Welsh Bicknor, a British country house
- Courtfield (ward), an electoral ward in Greater London
- Courtfield, the playing surface in one-wall handball
