= Baroness Ritchie =

Baroness Ritchie may refer to:

- Shireen Ritchie, Baroness Ritchie of Brompton (1945–2012), British politician
- Margaret Ritchie, Baroness Ritchie of Downpatrick (born 1958), Irish politician
