= 1982 Kensington and Chelsea London Borough Council election =

The 1982 Kensington and Chelsea Council election took place on 6 May 1982 to elect members of Kensington and Chelsea London Borough Council in London, England. The whole council was up for election and the Conservative party stayed in overall control of the council.

== Ward results ==
Abingdon (3)
Party	Candidate	Votes	%	±%

Avondale (3)
Party	Candidate	Votes	%	±%

Brompton (2)
Party	Candidate	Votes	%	±%

Campden (3)
Party	Candidate	Votes	%	±%

Cheyne (2)
Party	Candidate	Votes	%	±%

Church (2)
Party	Candidate	Votes	%	±%

Colville (3)
Party	Candidate	Votes	%	±%

Courtfield (3)
Party	Candidate	Votes	%	±%

Earls Court (3)
Party	Candidate	Votes	%	±%

Golborne (3)
Party	Candidate	Votes	%	±%

Hans Town (3)
Party	Candidate	Votes	%	±%

Holland (3)
Party	Candidate	Votes	%	±%

Kelfield (2)
Party	Candidate	Votes	%	±%

Norland (2)
Party	Candidate	Votes	%	±%

North Stanley (2)
Party	Candidate	Votes	%	±%

Pembridge (3)
Party	Candidate	Votes	%	±%

Queen's Gate (3)
Party	Candidate	Votes	%	±%

Redcliffe (3)
Party	Candidate	Votes	%	±%

Royal Hospital (2)
Party	Candidate	Votes	%	±%

St Charles (2)
Party	Candidate	Votes	%	±%

South Stanley (2)
Party	Candidate	Votes	%	±%
