= 2022 Kensington and Chelsea London Borough Council election =

2022 Kensington and Chelsea Council election
- 5 May 2022

All 50 council seats
	First party	Second party	Third party
Leader	Elizabeth Campbell	Mo Bakhtiar	Linda Wade
Party	Conservative	Labour	Liberal Democrats
Last election	36 seats, 51.4%	13 seats, 33.0%	1 seat, 12.4%
Seats won	35	13	2
Seat change	▼1	Steady	▲1
Popular vote	40,363	27,811	13,134
Percentage	48.7%	33.6%	15.9%
Swing	▼2.7%	▲0.6%	▲3.5%
- Results of the 2022 Kensington and Chelsea London Borough council election. Conservatives in blue, Labour in red and Liberal Democrats in yellow.
council control before election
Conservative
Subsequent council control
Conservative

The 2022 Kensington and Chelsea London Borough Council election was held on 5 May 2022. All 50 members of Kensington and Chelsea London Borough Council were elected. The elections took place alongside local elections in the other London boroughs and elections to local authorities across the United Kingdom.

The Conservative Party lost one seat to the Liberal Democrats, but maintained their majority on the council.

== Background ==
=== History ===
Result of the 2018 borough election

The thirty-two London boroughs were established in 1965 by the London Government Act 1963. They are the principal authorities in Greater London and have responsibilities including education, housing, planning, highways, social services, libraries, recreation, waste, environmental health and revenue collection. Some of the powers are shared with the Greater London Authority, which also manages passenger transport, police, and fire.

Kensington and Chelsea has been under Conservative control since its establishment. In the most recent election in 2018, the Conservatives won 36 seats with 51.4% of the vote across the borough; Labour won 13 seats with 33.0% of the vote and the Liberal Democrats won a single seat with 12.4% of the vote. The council had been a target for the Labour Party, who had been expected to perform better following the 2017 Grenfell Tower fire.

=== Council term ===
A Labour councillor for Dalgarno ward, Robert Thomson, resigned in early 2019 because his job required him to relocate. A by-election was held to fill his seat on 21 March 2019, which was won by the Labour candidate Kasim Ali with the Conservatives coming in second place.

Unlike most London boroughs, Kensington and Chelsea continued with the same ward boundaries it elected councillors under in 2018 as it had been subject to a recent boundary review.

== Electoral process ==
Kensington and Chelsea, as with all other London borough councils, elects all of its councillors at once every four years, with the previous election having taken place in 2018. The election took place by multi-member plurality block voting, with each ward being represented by two or three councillors. Electors had as many votes as there are councillors to be elected in their ward, with the top two or three being elected.

All registered electors (British, Irish, Commonwealth and European Union citizens) living in London aged 18 or over were entitled to vote in the election. People who lived at two addresses in different councils, such as university students with different term-time and holiday addresses, were entitled to be registered for and vote in elections in both local authorities. Voting in-person at polling stations took place from 7:00 to 22:00 on election day, and voters were able to apply for postal votes or proxy votes in advance of the election.

== Previous council composition ==
Councillors after the 2018 election

After 2018 election		Before 2022 election	
Party	Seats	Party	Seats
Conservative	36	Conservative	35
Labour	13	Labour	13
Liberal Democrats	1	Liberal Democrats	2

== Overall Results ==
Kensington and Chelsea London Borough Council election 2022
Party	Seats	Gains	Losses	Net gain/loss	Seats %	Votes %	Votes	+/−
Conservative	35	0	1	-1	70.0	43.9	14,744	-3.7
Labour	13	0	0	0	26.0	31.8	10,684	±0.0
Liberal Democrats	2	1	0	+1	4.0	21.2	7,114	+7.4
Green	0	0	0	0	0.0	2.5	841	+1.4
Independent	0	0	0	0	0.0	0.7	233	+0.6

== Results by ward ==
=== Abingdon ===
Abingdon (3)
Party	Candidate	Votes	%	±%
Conservative	Sarah Addenbrooke	1,019	60.0	−6.2
Conservative	Anne Cyron	964	56.5	−5.9
Conservative	James Husband	915	53.6	−8.1
Labour	Manju Gregory	374	21.9	+4.4
Labour	Nasrin Lari	342	20.0	+3.0
Liberal Democrats	Jeremy Good	335	19.6	+5.0
Labour	Bora Ristic	335	19.6	+4.4
Liberal Democrats	Jonathan Owen	330	19.3	+5.1
Liberal Democrats	Peter Kosta	279	16.3	+0.2
Turnout			32.2	
Conservative hold		Swing		
Conservative hold		Swing		
Conservative hold		Swing		

=== Brompton and Hans Town ===
Brompton and Hans Town (3)
Party	Candidate	Votes	%	±%
Conservative	Walaa Idris	1,044	64.2	−6.3
Conservative	Sof McVeigh	1,040	63.9	−5.6
Conservative	Mary Weale	1,032	63.4	−6.2
Labour	Marian Kearney	279	17.1	+1.9
Labour	Monica Preston	267	16.4	+1.4
Liberal Democrats	Maurizio Campolo	266	16.3	+4.1
Labour	Karl-Eric Cheron	266	16.3	+1.6
Liberal Democrats	Ewen Cameron	261	16.0	+7.4
Liberal Democrats	Robert Woodthorpe Browne	225	13.8	+5.5
Turnout			28.9	
Conservative hold		Swing		
Conservative hold		Swing		
Conservative hold		Swing		

=== Campden ===
Campden (3)
Party	Candidate	Votes	%	±%
Conservative	Catherine Faulks	1,122	58.6	−4.9
Conservative	Preety Hudd	1,026	53.6	−9.8
Conservative	Lloyd North	995	52.0	−7.8
Labour	Margaret McDonald	417	21.8	+8.6
Labour	Heathcote Ruthann	365	19.1	+6.1
Liberal Democrats	Juan Carrizosa	343	17.9	+2.8
Liberal Democrats	Elizabeth Wade	341	17.8	+4.8
Labour	Tabatha Vaughan	333	17.4	+2.6
Green	Luke Douglas-Home	294	15.4	N/A
Liberal Democrats	Christopher Coplans	292	15.3	+4.2
Turnout			35.6	
Conservative hold		Swing		
Conservative hold		Swing		
Conservative hold		Swing		

=== Chelsea Riverside ===
Chelsea Riverside (3)
Party	Candidate	Votes	%	±%
Conservative	Laura Burns	1,007	46.8	−1.6
Conservative	Gerard Hargreaves	941	43.7	−3.4
Conservative	Sonia Zvedeniuk	923	42.9	−4.4
Labour	Jake Thomas	819	38.0	+1.1
Labour	Mike Coelho	805	36.7	−0.1
Labour	Cihan Cheron	722	32.9	−3.6
Liberal Democrats	Margo Schwartz	643	29.3	+19.6
Turnout			35.9	
Conservative hold		Swing		
Conservative hold		Swing		
Conservative hold		Swing		

=== Colville ===
Colville (3)
Party	Candidate	Votes	%	±%
Labour	Toby Benton	1,108	59.8	+5.1
Labour	Mohammed Bakhtiar	1,091	58.9	+7.2
Labour	Dahabo Isse	1,014	54.8	+4.4
Conservative	Ellie Lines	458	24.7	−3.1
Conservative	Roni Greenfield	453	24.4	−0.9
Conservative	Becky Walsh	441	23.8	−0.2
Liberal Democrats	Josie Mayers	298	16.1	+3.7
Liberal Democrats	Jules Lipton	257	13.9	+2.3
Liberal Democrats	Alex Nowak	226	12.2	+2.7
Turnout			29.6	
Labour hold		Swing		
Labour hold		Swing		
Labour hold		Swing		

=== Courtfield ===
Courtfield (3)
Party	Candidate	Votes	%	±%
Conservative	Janet Evans	1,068	59.6	−9.4
Conservative	Greg Hammond	1,037	57.8	−10.3
Conservative	Quentin Marshall	947	52.8	−13.8
Liberal Democrats	Marc Goldfinger	740	41.3	+27.1
Labour	Fatima Kara	282	15.7	+4.0
Labour	Marius Brill	270	15.1	+4.4
Labour	Rene Gimpel	270	15.1	+2.4
Turnout			32.8	
Conservative hold		Swing		
Conservative hold		Swing		
Conservative hold		Swing		

=== Dalgarno ===
Dalgarno (2)
Party	Candidate	Votes	%	±%
Labour	Kasim Ali	867	60.2	−13.5
Labour	Eva Jedut	837	58.1	−7.4
Conservative	Theodore Karpinksi	316	21.9	−1.1
Conservative	Anjulika Vatish	276	19.2	+0.8
Liberal Democrats	Alexandra Tatton-Brown	159	11.0	+3.0
Independent	Delores Patterson	156	10.8	N/A
Independent	Philip Williams	155	10.8	N/A
Turnout			31.7	
Labour hold		Swing		
Labour hold		Swing		

=== Earl's Court ===
Earl's Court (3)
Party	Candidate	Votes	%	±%
Liberal Democrats	Linda Wade	1,048	51.1	+5.8
Liberal Democrats	Tim Verboven	757	36.9	+11.2
Conservative	Hamish Adourian	705	34.4	+2.1
Liberal Democrats	Christophe Noblet	699	34.1	+10.1
Conservative	Stéphanie Petit	674	32.8	−5.8
Conservative	Max Chauhan	608	29.6	−2.3
Labour	Bruno Diantantou	415	20.2	−5.6
Labour	Sharda Rowena	398	19.4	−5.9
Labour	John Winter	286	13.9	−6.5
Green	Erwin Schaeffer	209	10.2	+0.8
Turnout			34.2	
Liberal Democrats hold		Swing		
Liberal Democrats gain from Conservative		Swing		
Conservative hold		Swing		

=== Golborne ===
Golborne (3)
Party	Candidate	Votes	%	±%
Labour	Mona Adam	1,036	69.1	−8.4
Labour	Sina Lari	1,005	67.0	−1.9
Labour	Abdullahi Nur	950	63.4	−10.1
Conservative	Elizabeth Acka	297	19.8	+5.7
Conservative	Margaret Parker	278	18.5	+5.5
Conservative	Michael Walsh	259	17.3	+5.4
Liberal Democrats	Sheila McGuirk	160	10.7	+2.8
Liberal Democrats	William Somers	133	8.9	+2.8
Turnout			25.2	
Labour hold		Swing		
Labour hold		Swing		
Labour hold		Swing		

=== Holland ===
Holland (3)
Party	Candidate	Votes	%	±%
Conservative	Lucinda Knight	1,049	52.1	−0.2
Conservative	Johnny Thalassites	1,019	50.6	+0.5
Conservative	Aarien Areti	993	49.3	−3.5
Labour	Samantha Batra	731	36.3	+2.9
Labour	Nathaniel McBride	654	32.5	+2.4
Labour	Axel Landin	650	32.3	+0.4
Liberal Democrats	Hugh Lalor	241	12.0	+0.9
Liberal Democrats	Noel McNamara	241	12.0	−1.3
Liberal Democrats	Leopold Rupf	189	9.4	N/A
Turnout			35.9	
Conservative hold		Swing		
Conservative hold		Swing		
Conservative hold		Swing		

=== Norland ===
Norland (2)
Party	Candidate	Votes	%	±%
Conservative	David Lindsay	787	49.2	−9.6
Conservative	Stuart Graham	738	46.2	−11.3
Labour	Sylvia Parnell	355	22.2	−1.6
Green	Fabien Frenzel	338	21.1	N/A
Green	Angela Georgievski	299	18.7	N/A
Labour	Bernard Shaw	289	18.1	−3.0
Liberal Democrats	Tom Fox	162	10.1	−1.8
Liberal Democrats	Blanche Girouard	157	9.8	−0.6
Turnout			41.6	
Conservative hold		Swing		
Conservative hold		Swing		

=== Notting Dale ===
Notting Dale (3)
Party	Candidate	Votes	%	±%
Labour	Claire Simmons	1,200	68.4	−3.9
Labour	Mona Ahmed	1,180	67.3	−0.8
Labour	Marwan Elnaghi	1,162	66.2	−1.1
Conservative	Filippo Salamone	329	18.8	+1.5
Conservative	Mehreen Malik	314	17.9	+1.0
Conservative	Sasi Kamaladasan	300	17.1	+0.8
Liberal Democrats	Rosemary Somers	194	11.1	+6.0
Liberal Democrats	Philip Chenery	191	10.9	+1.7
Liberal Democrats	Yury Kanavalau	125	7.1	N/A
Turnout			30.6	
Labour hold		Swing		
Labour hold		Swing		
Labour hold		Swing		

=== Pembridge ===
Pembridge (2)
Party	Candidate	Votes	%	±%
Conservative	Joanna Gardner	609	46.8	−6.9
Conservative	Dori Schmetterling	560	43.0	−7.8
Liberal Democrats	Sam Dodgshon	448	34.4	+17.6
Labour	Lorna Kelly	393	30.1	+1.5
Labour	Jonathan Daniels	386	29.6	+4.7
Turnout			36.5	
Conservative hold		Swing		
Conservative hold		Swing		

=== Queen's Gate ===
Queen's Gate (3)
Party	Candidate	Votes	%	±%
Conservative	Roberto Weeden-Sanz	966	59.0	−8.7
Conservative	Will Lane	955	58.3	−8.4
Conservative	Sam Mackover	942	57.5	−8.9
Liberal Democrats	Blaise Baquiche	548	33.5	+15.6
Labour	Lenore Robinson	331	20.2	+6.1
Labour	Tim Thomas	260	15.9	+2.4
Labour	Hassan Muhammad	252	15.4	+2.8
Turnout			34.7	
Conservative hold		Swing		
Conservative hold		Swing		
Conservative hold		Swing		

=== Redcliffe ===
Redcliffe (3)
Party	Candidate	Votes	%	±%
Conservative	Thomas Bennett	1,038	55.5	−6.9
Conservative	Marie-Therese Rossi	973	52.1	−8.7
Conservative	Sidney Yankson	883	47.2	−9.4
Liberal Democrats	Jean-Francois Burford	634	33.9	+18.5
Labour	Anne Corbett	494	26.4	+6.9
Labour	Otto Barrow	407	21.8	+5.3
Labour	Alfie Gee	364	19.5	+3.1
Turnout			30.6	
Conservative hold		Swing		
Conservative hold		Swing		
Conservative hold		Swing		

=== Royal Hospital ===
Royal Hospital (3)
Party	Candidate	Votes	%	±%
Conservative	Elizabeth Campbell	1,387	69.0	−5.8
Conservative	Emma Will	1,309	65.1	−6.2
Conservative	Cem Kemahli	1,261	62.7	−7.1
Liberal Democrats	Jean Goodliffe	326	16.2	+6.5
Liberal Democrats	Penny Pocock	315	15.7	+4.3
Labour	David Kear	307	15.3	+1.6
Labour	Pat Mason	283	14.1	+0.5
Labour	Soushian Samadi	281	14.0	+0.7
Liberal Democrats	Theodore Goodliffe	265	13.2	+3.7
Turnout			32.7	
Conservative hold		Swing		
Conservative hold		Swing		
Conservative hold		Swing		

=== St Helen's ===
St Helen's (2)
Party	Candidate	Votes	%	±%
Labour	Emma Dent Coad	811	52.1	−0.4
Labour	Portia Thaxter	739	47.5	−1.8
Conservative	Miloud Bouhaddou	522	33.5	+3.5
Conservative	Maxwell Woodger	521	33.5	−0.2
Liberal Democrats	Carmel McLoughlin	167	10.7	−3.2
Liberal Democrats	Jibril Al-Nabahani	118	7.6	−3.0
Independent	Eve Allison	77	4.9	−28.8
Turnout			36.2	
Labour hold		Swing		
Labour hold		Swing		

=== Stanley ===
Stanley (3)
Party	Candidate	Votes	%	±%
Conservative	Kim Taylor-Smith	1,031	55.9	−4.3
Conservative	Josh Rendall	1,027	55.7	−5.2
Conservative	Will Pascall	1,005	54.5	−5.4
Labour	Leon Garner	465	25.2	+2.4
Liberal Democrats	Helena Marconell	402	21.8	+13.2
Labour	Abdulmajid Malin	373	20.2	−1.5
Liberal Democrats	Jose Buera Cienfuegos-Jovellanos	312	16.9	+9.2
Liberal Democrats	Carl Michel	307	16.7	+7.6
Labour	Peerzada Bukhari	291	15.8	−5.6
Turnout			30.1	
Conservative hold		Swing		
Conservative hold		Swing		
Conservative hold		Swing		

== Changes 2022–2026 ==
=== Affiliation Changes ===
Cllr Toby Benton and Cllr Mona Adam left the Labour Party and joined the Green Party.

Cllr Eva Jedut left the Labour Party, sitting as an independent, then briefly joining the Workers Party of Britain then sitting as an independent again. She then joined Advance UK in March 2026.

Cllr Emma Dent Coad left the Labour Party to sit as an independent.

Norland by-election, 2 May 2024
Party	Candidate	Votes	%	±%
Conservative	Stephanie Petit	902	51.0	–5.8
Labour	Monica Press	514	29.1	+6.1
Liberal Democrats	Finlay O'Rourke Dargan	229	13.0	+1.5
Green	Heloise Hunter	123	7.0	N/A
Majority		388	21.9	N/A
Turnout		1,790	46.8	+5.2
Registered electors		3,824		
Conservative hold		Swing	▼6.0	

The Norland by-election was triggered by the resignation of Conservative councillor Stuart Graham.
