= 1986 Kensington and Chelsea London Borough Council election =

1986 local election in England

The 1986 Kensington and Chelsea Council election took place on 8 May 1986 to elect members of Kensington and Chelsea London Borough Council in London, England. The whole council was up for election and the Conservative Party stayed in overall control of the council.

== Ward results ==
Abingdon (3)
Party	Candidate	Votes	%	±%

Avondale (3)
Party	Candidate	Votes	%	±%

Brompton (2)
Party	Candidate	Votes	%	±%
Conservative	David P. M. Hudson	640		
Conservative	Melinda J. Libby	593		
Alliance	John A. E. Howard	139		
Alliance	Cyril Kinsky	112		
Labour	Philip G. Clayton	58		
Labour	Edward W. Beier	54		
Green	John M. Slater	27		
Turnout			33.6	
Conservative hold				
Conservative hold				

Campden (3)
Party	Candidate	Votes	%	±%

Cheyne (2)
Party	Candidate	Votes	%	±%

Church (2)
Party	Candidate	Votes	%	±%

Colville (3)
Party	Candidate	Votes	%	±%

Courtfield (3)
Party	Candidate	Votes	%	±%

Earls Court (3)
Party	Candidate	Votes	%	±%

Golborne (3)
Party	Candidate	Votes	%	±%

Hans Town (3)
Party	Candidate	Votes	%	±%

Holland (3)
Party	Candidate	Votes	%	±%

Kelfield (2)
Party	Candidate	Votes	%	±%

Norland (2)
Party	Candidate	Votes	%	±%

North Stanley (2)
Party	Candidate	Votes	%	±%

Pembridge (3)
Party	Candidate	Votes	%	±%

Queen's Gate (3)
Party	Candidate	Votes	%	±%

Redcliffe (3)
Party	Candidate	Votes	%	±%

Royal Hospital (2)
Party	Candidate	Votes	%	±%

St Charles (2)
Party	Candidate	Votes	%	±%

South Stanley (2)
Party	Candidate	Votes	%	±%
