= Shireen Ritchie, Baroness Ritchie of Brompton =

Step-mother of director Guy Ritchie

The Right Honourable The Baroness Ritchie of Brompton
- Ritchie in the Lords chamber, 2011

Member of the House of Lords
- Lord Temporal
- Life peerage 25 June 2010 – 24 April 2012

Personal details
- Born: Shireen Olive Folkard; 22 June 1945
- Died: 24 April 2012 (aged 66)
- Party: Conservative
- Spouse(s): John Williams; John Vivian Ritchie
- Children: 1
- Education: St Mary's Gate School, Southbourne, Dorset

Shireen Olive Ritchie, Baroness Ritchie of Brompton (née Folkard; 22 June 1945 – 24 April 2012) was a Conservative Councillor for the Brompton ward, Royal Borough of Kensington and Chelsea and advocate for women in the Conservative Party of the United Kingdom. She was a Conservative working peer in the House of Lords and President of the National Children's Bureau.

== Politics ==
Shireen Ritchie was a Kensington and Chelsea Councillor from 1998 representing the Brompton ward on the council. In 2008, she provided testimony as part of the Home Affairs Committee hearings on Trade in Human Beings. She was involved in efforts of the Conservative Party to raise awareness among constituents about the importance of the issue of diversity to the party, including the party's Women2Win efforts in 2005, and Priority List (A-List) candidates, for which she received scorn from other Conservative party members. She held a seat as the Chair of the party's Candidates Committee and was named as a 'Champion' for the Conservative Women's Organisation.

While she was chair of LGA's Family and Children's Services in 2010, the department underwent an effort to reduce paperwork to "ease the pressure on social workers and increase the quality of care offered to children." She was a member of the Family Justice Review Panel.

On 25 June 2010, Ritchie was created a life peer as Baroness Ritchie of Brompton, of Brompton, in the Royal Borough of Kensington and Chelsea, and she was introduced in the House of Lords on 29 June 2010.

== Personal life ==
Born Shireen Olive Folkard, she spent her early life in Yemen where her father was a British diplomat. After attending St Mary's Gate School, Southbourne, Dorset, she worked as a fashion model until her marriage.

She had a son by her first marriage to John Williams. Her second marriage was to the advertising executive John Vivian Ritchie, becoming stepmother to his children Tabitha Ritchie and Guy Ritchie.

Ritchie died on 24 April 2012, aged 66, having been suffering from cancer.
