= 1964 Kensington and Chelsea London Borough Council election =

1964 local election in England

The 1964 Kensington and Chelsea Council election took place on 7 May 1964 to elect members of Kensington and Chelsea London Borough Council in London, England. The whole council was up for election and the Conservative party gained control of the council.

== Background ==
These elections were the first to the newly formed borough. Previously elections had taken place in the Metropolitan Borough of Chelsea and Metropolitan Borough of Kensington. These boroughs were joined to form the new London Borough of Kensington and Chelsea by the London Government Act 1963.

A total of 168 candidates stood in the election for the 60 seats being contested across 15 wards. These included a full slate from the Conservative party, while the Labour and Liberal parties stood 59 and 42 respectively. Other candidates included 7 from the Communist party. There were 4 six-seat wards, 4 two-seat wards, 3 four-seat wards, 3 three-seat wards and 1 seven-seat ward.

This election had aldermen as well as directly elected councillors. The Conservatives got 8 aldermen and Labour 2.

The Council was elected in 1964 as a "shadow authority" but did not start operations until 1 April 1965.

== Election result ==
The results saw the Conservatives gain the new council with a majority of 32 after winning 46 of the 60 seats. Overall turnout in the election was 25.5%. This turnout included 626 postal votes.

== Ward results ==
Brompton (4)
Party	Candidate	Votes	%	±%
Turnout		2,016	22.1	
	Conservative win (new seat)			
	Conservative win (new seat)			
	Conservative win (new seat)			
	Conservative win (new seat)			

Cheyne (2)
Party	Candidate	Votes	%	±%
Turnout		1,576	27.1	
	Conservative win (new seat)			
	Conservative win (new seat)			

Church (3)
Party	Candidate	Votes	%	±%
Turnout		2,099	31.5	
	Conservative win (new seat)			
	Conservative win (new seat)			
	Conservative win (new seat)			

Earls Court (6)
Party	Candidate	Votes	%	±%
Turnout		3,081	21.4	
	Conservative win (new seat)			
	Conservative win (new seat)			
	Conservative win (new seat)			
	Conservative win (new seat)			
	Conservative win (new seat)			
	Conservative win (new seat)			

Golborne (3)
Party	Candidate	Votes	%	±%
Turnout		1,582	19.3	
	Labour win (new seat)			
	Labour win (new seat)			
	Labour win (new seat)			

Hans Town (3)
Party	Candidate	Votes	%	±%
Turnout		1,763	28.6	
	Conservative win (new seat)			
	Conservative win (new seat)			
	Conservative win (new seat)			

Holland (6)
Party	Candidate	Votes	%	±%
Turnout		3,717	23.6	
	Conservative win (new seat)			
	Conservative win (new seat)			
	Conservative win (new seat)			
	Conservative win (new seat)			
	Conservative win (new seat)			
	Conservative win (new seat)			

Norland (4)
Party	Candidate	Votes	%	±%
Turnout		3,821	33.6	
	Labour win (new seat)			
	Labour win (new seat)			
	Labour win (new seat)			
	Labour win (new seat)			

North Stanley (2)
Party	Candidate	Votes	%	±%
Turnout		1,725	35.6	
	Conservative win (new seat)			
	Conservative win (new seat)			

Pembridge (6)
Party	Candidate	Votes	%	±%
Turnout		4,168	28.4	
	Conservative win (new seat)			
	Conservative win (new seat)			
	Conservative win (new seat)			
	Conservative win (new seat)			
	Conservative win (new seat)			
	Conservative win (new seat)			

Queen's Gate (4)
Party	Candidate	Votes	%	±%
Turnout		2,369	24.2	
	Conservative win (new seat)			
	Conservative win (new seat)			
	Conservative win (new seat)			
	Conservative win (new seat)			

Redcliffe (7)
Party	Candidate	Votes	%	±%
Turnout		3,578	22.0	
	Conservative win (new seat)			
	Conservative win (new seat)			
	Conservative win (new seat)			
	Conservative win (new seat)			
	Conservative win (new seat)			
	Conservative win (new seat)			
	Conservative win (new seat)			

Royal Hospital (2)
Party	Candidate	Votes	%	±%
Turnout		1,446	27.0	
	Conservative win (new seat)			
	Conservative win (new seat)			

St Charles (6)
Party	Candidate	Votes	%	±%
Turnout		3,398	20.9	
	Labour win (new seat)			
	Labour win (new seat)			
	Labour win (new seat)			
	Labour win (new seat)			
	Labour win (new seat)			
	Labour win (new seat)			

South Stanley (2)
Party	Candidate	Votes	%	±%
Turnout		2,090	34.9	
	Labour win (new seat)			
	Conservative win (new seat)			

Labour nominee A. J. Kazantzis was rejected because one of his assenting signatories had signed the nomination papers of Mr. Banner-Stone and Mr. Dutch.
