= Dalgarno (ward) =

Electoral ward in London, England

- Electoral ward for the Kensington and Chelsea London Borough Council
- Dalgarno ward boundaries since 2014
- Borough: Kensington and Chelsea
- County: Greater London
- Population: 7,212 (2021)
- Electorate: 4,547
- Major settlements: North Kensington
- Area: 0.9264 square kilometres (0.3577 sq mi)

Current electoral ward
- Created: 2014
- Number of members: 2
- Councillors: Kasim Ali; Eva Jedut
- Created from: Golborne; St Charles
- GSS code: E05009394

Dalgarno is an electoral ward in the Royal Borough of Kensington and Chelsea. The ward was first used in the 2014 elections and elects two councillors to Kensington and Chelsea London Borough Council.

== List of councillors ==
Seat	Councillor	Took office	Left office	Party	Election
1	Pat Healy	2014	2022	Labour	2014, 2018
2	Robert Thompson	2014	2019	Labour	2014, 2018
2	Kasim Ali	2019	Incumbent	Labour	2019, 2022
1	Eva Jedut (Note: Eva Jedut changed parties in 2023 and 2026.)	2022	Incumbent	Labour	2022
1	Eva Jedut	2022	Incumbent	Independent	2022
1	Eva Jedut	2022	Incumbent	Advance UK	2022

== Kensington and Chelsea council elections ==
The Dalgarno electoral ward was created in 2014.

=== 2022 election ===
The election took place on 5 May 2022.

2022 Kensington and Chelsea London Borough Council election Dalgarno
Party	Candidate	Votes	%	±%
Labour	Kasim Ali	867	60.2	−13.5
Labour	Eva Jedut	837	58.1	−7.4
Conservative	Theodore Karpinksi	316	21.9	−1.1
Conservative	Anjulika Vatish	276	19.2	+0.8
Liberal Democrats	Alexandra Tatton-Brown	159	11.0	+3.0
Independent	Delores Patterson	156	10.8	N/A
Independent	Philip Williams	155	10.8	N/A
Turnout			31.7	
Labour hold		Swing		
Labour hold		Swing		

=== 2019 by-election ===
The by-election took place on 21 March 2019, following the resignation of Robert Thompson.

2019 Dalgarno by-election
Party	Candidate	Votes	%	±%
Labour	Kasim Ali	719	55.4	−15.0
Conservative	Samia Bentayeb	306	23.6	+1.6
Liberal Democrats	Alexandra Tatton-Brown	145	11.2	+3.5
UKIP	Callum Hutton	68	5.2	+5.2
Green	Angela Georgievski	61	4.7	+4.7
Majority		413	31.8	
Turnout		1,299		
Labour hold		Swing		

=== 2018 election ===
The election took place on 3 May 2018.

2018 Kensington and Chelsea London Borough Council election: Dalgarno
Party	Candidate	Votes	%	±%
Labour	Pat Healy	1,258	73.7	+11.2
Labour	Robert Thompson	1,119	65.5	+13.4
Conservative	Marina Palmer	393	23.0	+2.5
Conservative	Dougal Steward	315	18.4	+1.4
Liberal Democrats	Jacqueline Taylor	137	8.0	+1.3
Turnout				
Labour hold		Swing		
Labour hold		Swing		

=== 2014 election ===
The election took place on 22 May 2014.

2014 Kensington and Chelsea London Borough Council election: Dalgarno
Party	Candidate	Votes	%	±%
Labour	Pat Healy	977	62.5	
Labour	Robert Thompson	814	52.1	
Conservative	Sarah Addenbrooke	320	20.5	
Conservative	Ned Donovan	266	17.0	
UKIP	Mike Jones	253	16.2	
Liberal Democrats	Josephine Mayers	105	6.7	
Liberal Democrats	Joe Tatton-Brown	91	5.8	
Turnout		1,563	34.1	
Labour win (new seat)				
Labour win (new seat)				
