= Joan Hanham, Baroness Hanham =

British life peer (1939–2025)

The Right Honourable The Baroness Hanham CBE
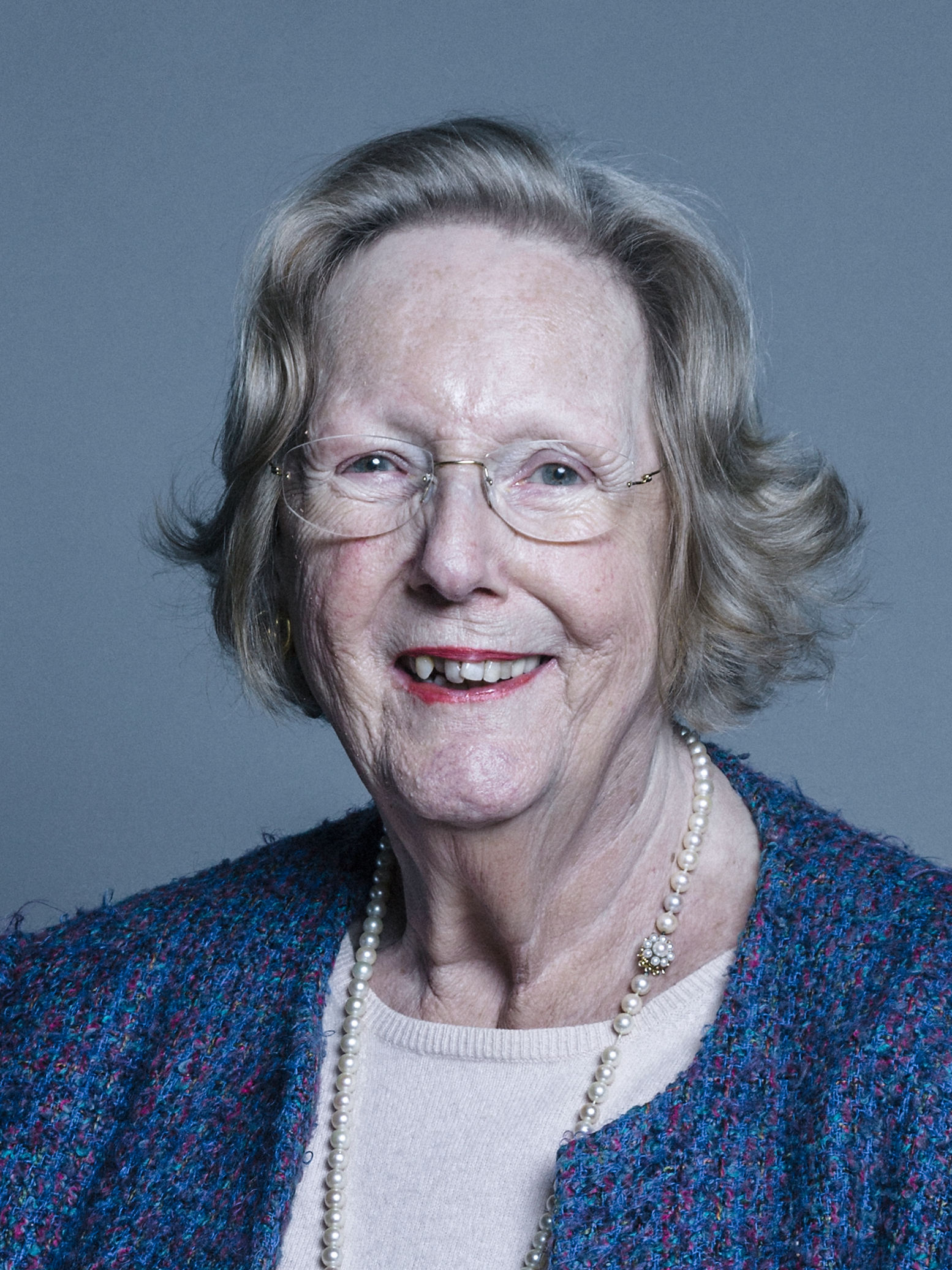
- Official portrait, 2018

Parliamentary Under-Secretary of State for Communities and Local Government
- In office 12 May 2010 – 7 October 2013
- Prime Minister: David Cameron
- Preceded by: The Lord McKenzie of Luton
- Succeeded by: The Baroness Stowell of Beeston

Member of the House of Lords
- Lord Temporal
- Life peerage 15 July 1999 – 22 July 2020

Personal details
- Born: Joan Brownlow Spark; 23 September 1939
- Died: 24 January 2025 (aged 85)
- Party: Conservative
- Spouse: Ian (or Iain) William Fergusson Hanham (m. 1964)

Joan Brownlow Hanham, Baroness Hanham, CBE (née Spark; 23 September 1939 – 24 January 2025) was a British politician who was a member of the House of Lords. She sat as a Conservative.

Hanham was parliamentary under-secretary of state at the Department for Communities and Local Government from 2010 to 2013, and was leader of the Kensington and Chelsea London Borough Council from 1989. She was succeeded by councillor Merrick Cockell, who became leader in April 2000.

She was made a life peer as Baroness Hanham, of Kensington in the Royal Borough of Kensington and Chelsea, on 15 July 1999. That same year, Hanham was a candidate for the re-run Conservative nomination to be Mayor of London, losing to Steven Norris. She retired from the House of Lords on 22 July 2020, and died in January 2025, at the age of 85.

== National Health Service ==
The daughter of Alfred Spark and Mary Mitchell, she married, in 1964, Ian (or Iain) William Fergusson Hanham, an oncologist and also a member of the Kensington and Chelsea London Borough Council from 2002 until his death on 12 April 2011.

Hanham was Chairman of St. Mary's Hospital NHS Trust from 2000 to 2007 and of Westminster Primary Care Trust. She became a Freeman of the City of London in 1984 and was appointed a Commander of the Order of the British Empire (CBE) in the 1997 Birthday Honours for services to local government. She was Parliamentary Under Secretary of State in the Department for Communities and Local Government from 2010 until 2013. She was awarded the Freedom of the Royal Borough of Kensington and Chelsea on 19 January 2011. In January 2014 she was appointed the interim chair of health sector regulator Monitor.
