= Stanley (ward) =

Electoral ward in London, England

- Electoral ward for the Kensington and Chelsea London Borough Council
- Borough: Kensington and Chelsea
- County: Greater London
- Population: 8,581 (2021)
- Area: 0.7253 km²

Current electoral ward
- Created: 2002
- Councillors: 3

Stanley is an electoral ward in the Royal Borough of Kensington and Chelsea. The ward was first used in the 2002 elections and elects three councillors to Kensington and Chelsea London Borough Council.

== Councillors ==
Election	Councillors		
2022	Kim Taylor-Smith (Conservative)	Josh Rendall (Conservative)	Will Pascall (Conservative)

== Elections ==
=== 2022 ===
Stanley (3)
Party	Candidate	Votes	%	±%
Conservative	Kim Taylor-Smith	1,031	55.9	−4.3
Conservative	Josh Rendall	1,027	55.7	−5.2
Conservative	Will Pascall	1,005	54.5	−5.4
Labour	Leon Garner	465	25.2	+2.4
Liberal Democrats	Helena Marconell	402	21.8	+13.2
Labour	Abdulmajid Malin	373	20.2	−1.5
Liberal Democrats	Jose Buera Cienfuegos-Jovellanos	312	16.9	+9.2
Liberal Democrats	Carl Michel	307	16.7	+7.6
Labour	Peerzada Bukhari	291	15.8	−5.6
Turnout			30.1	
Conservative hold		Swing		
Conservative hold		Swing		
Conservative hold		Swing		

== See also ==
- List of electoral wards in Greater London
