= Brompton and Hans Town =

Electoral ward in London, England

- Electoral ward for the Kensington and Chelsea London Borough Council
- Borough: Kensington and Chelsea
- County: Greater London
- Population: 7,789 (2021)
- Area: 0.9473 km²

Current electoral ward
- Created: 2014
- Councillors: 3

Brompton and Hans Town is an electoral ward in the Royal Borough of Kensington and Chelsea. The ward was first used in the 2014 elections and elects three councillors to Kensington and Chelsea London Borough Council.

== Geography ==
The ward is named after Brompton and Hans Town.

== Councillors ==
Election	Councillors		
2022	Walaa Idris (Conservative)	Sof McVeigh (Conservative)	James Husband (Conservative)

== Elections ==
=== 2022 ===
Brompton and Hans Town (3)
Party	Candidate	Votes	%	±%
Conservative	Walaa Idris	1,044	64.2	−6.3
Conservative	Sof McVeigh	1,040	63.9	−5.6
Conservative	Mary Weale	1,032	63.4	−6.2
Labour	Marian Kearney	279	17.1	+1.9
Labour	Monica Preston	267	16.4	+1.4
Liberal Democrats	Maurizio Campolo	266	16.3	+4.1
Labour	Karl-Eric Cheron	266	16.3	+1.6
Liberal Democrats	Ewen Cameron	261	16.0	+7.4
Liberal Democrats	Robert Woodthorpe Browne	225	13.8	+5.5
Turnout			28.9	
Conservative hold		Swing		
Conservative hold		Swing		
Conservative hold		Swing		

== See also ==
- List of electoral wards in Greater London
