= Royal Hospital (ward) =

Electoral ward in London, England

- Electoral ward for the Kensington and Chelsea London Borough Council
- Borough: Kensington and Chelsea
- County: Greater London
- Population: 8,417 (2021)
- Area: 0.9266 km²

Current electoral ward
- Created: 1965
- Councillors: 3 (since 2002); 2 (until 2002)

Royal Hospital is an electoral ward in the Royal Borough of Kensington and Chelsea. The ward was first used in the 1964 elections and elects three councillors to Kensington and Chelsea London Borough Council.

== Geography ==
The ward is named after the Royal Hospital Chelsea.

== Councillors ==
| Election | Councillors | | |
|---|---|---|---|
| 2022 | Elizabeth Campbell (Conservative) | Emma Will (Conservative) | Cem Kemahli (Conservative) |

== Elections ==
=== 2022 ===
Royal Hospital (3)
| Party | Candidate | Votes | % | ±% |
|---|---|---|---|---|
| Conservative | Elizabeth Campbell | 1,387 | 69.0 | −5.8 |
| Conservative | Emma Will | 1,309 | 65.1 | −6.2 |
| Conservative | Cem Kemahli | 1,261 | 62.7 | −7.1 |
| Liberal Democrats | Jean Goodliffe | 326 | 16.2 | +6.5 |
| Liberal Democrats | Penny Pocock | 315 | 15.7 | +4.3 |
| Labour | David Kear | 307 | 15.3 | +1.6 |
| Labour | Pat Mason | 283 | 14.1 | +0.5 |
| Labour | Soushian Samadi | 281 | 14.0 | +0.7 |
| Liberal Democrats | Theodore Goodliffe | 265 | 13.2 | +3.7 |
| Turnout | | | 32.7 | |
| Conservative hold | | Swing | | |
| Conservative hold | | Swing | | |
| Conservative hold | | Swing | | |

== See also ==
- List of electoral wards in Greater London
