= Redcliffe (ward) =

Electoral ward in London, England

- Electoral ward for the Kensington and Chelsea London Borough Council
- Borough: Kensington and Chelsea
- County: Greater London
- Population: 9,194 (2021)
- Area: 0.7228 km²

Current electoral ward
- Created: 1965
- Councillors: 3 (since 1974); 7 (until 1974)

Redcliffe is an electoral ward in the Royal Borough of Kensington and Chelsea. The ward was first used in the 1964 elections and elects three councillors to Kensington and Chelsea London Borough Council.

== Geography ==
The ward is named after the Redcliffe area.

== Councillors ==
Election	Councillors		
2022	Thomas Bennett (Conservative)	Marie-Therese Rossi (Conservative)	Sidney Yankson (Conservative)

== Elections ==
=== 2022 ===
Redcliffe (3)
Party	Candidate	Votes	%	±%
Conservative	Thomas Bennett	1,038	55.5	−6.9
Conservative	Marie-Therese Rossi	973	52.1	−8.7
Conservative	Sidney Yankson	883	47.2	−9.4
Liberal Democrats	Jean-Francois Burford	634	33.9	+18.5
Labour	Anne Corbett	494	26.4	+6.9
Labour	Otto Barrow	407	21.8	+5.3
Labour	Alfie Gee	364	19.5	+3.1
Turnout			30.6	
Conservative hold		Swing		
Conservative hold		Swing		
Conservative hold		Swing		

== See also ==
- List of electoral wards in Greater London
