= Colville (ward) =

Electoral ward in London, England

- Electoral ward for the Kensington and Chelsea London Borough Council
- Borough: Kensington and Chelsea
- County: Greater London
- Population: 8,574 (2021)
- Area: 0.4681 km²

Current electoral ward
- Created: 1974
- Councillors: 3

Colville is an electoral ward in the Royal Borough of Kensington and Chelsea. The ward was first used in the 1974 elections and elects three councillors to Kensington and Chelsea London Borough Council.

== Geography ==
The ward is named after the Colville area.

== Councillors ==
Election	Councillors		
2022	Toby Benton (Labour) (Independent since 2025)	Mohammed Bakhtiar (Labour)	Dahabo Isse (Labour) (Conservative since 2024)

== Elections ==
=== 2022 ===
Colville (3)
Party	Candidate	Votes	%	±%
Labour	Toby Benton	1,108	59.8	+5.1
Labour	Mohammed Bakhtiar	1,091	58.9	+7.2
Labour	Dahabo Isse	1,014	54.8	+4.4
Conservative	Ellie Lines	458	24.7	−3.1
Conservative	Roni Greenfield	453	24.4	−0.9
Conservative	Becky Walsh	441	23.8	−0.2
Liberal Democrats	Josie Mayers	298	16.1	+3.7
Liberal Democrats	Jules Lipton	257	13.9	+2.3
Liberal Democrats	Alex Nowak	226	12.2	+2.7
Turnout			29.6	
Labour hold		Swing		
Labour hold		Swing		
Labour hold		Swing		

== See also ==
- List of electoral wards in Greater London
