= Earl's Court (ward) =

Electoral ward in London, England

- Electoral ward for the Kensington and Chelsea London Borough Council
- Borough: Kensington and Chelsea
- County: Greater London
- Population: 8,937 (2021)
- Major settlements: Earl's Court
- Area: 0.4817 km²

Current electoral ward
- Created: 1965
- Councillors: 3

Earl's Court is an electoral ward in the Royal Borough of Kensington and Chelsea. The ward was first used in the 1964 elections and elects three councillors to Kensington and Chelsea London Borough Council. The ward was known as Earls Court from 1965 to 2002.

== Geography ==
The ward is named after Earl's Court.

== Councillors ==
Election	Councillors		
2026	Linda Wade (Liberal Democrats)	James Ortiz (Liberal Democrats)	Sofia Gurrola (Liberal Democrats)

== Elections ==
=== 2022 ===
Earl's Court (3)
Party	Candidate	Votes	%	±%
Liberal Democrats	Linda Wade	1,048	51.1	+5.8
Liberal Democrats	Tim Verboven	757	36.9	+11.2
Conservative	Hamish Adourian	705	34.4	+2.1
Liberal Democrats	Christophe Noblet	699	34.1	+10.1
Conservative	Stéphanie Petit	674	32.8	−5.8
Conservative	Max Chauhan	608	29.6	−2.3
Labour	Bruno Diantantou	415	20.2	−5.6
Labour	Sharda Rowena	398	19.4	−5.9
Labour	John Winter	286	13.9	−6.5
Green	Erwin Schaeffer	209	10.2	+0.8
Turnout			34.2	
Liberal Democrats hold		Swing		
Liberal Democrats gain from Conservative		Swing		
Conservative hold		Swing		

== See also ==
- List of electoral wards in Greater London
