= Norland (ward) =

- Electoral ward for the Kensington and Chelsea London Borough Council
- Norland ward boundaries since 2014
- Borough: Kensington and Chelsea
- County: Greater London
- Population: 5,701 (2021)
- Electorate: 3,841 (2022)
- Area: 0.5361 square kilometres (0.2070 sq mi)

Current electoral ward
- Created: 1965
- GSS code: E05009398 (2014–present)

Norland is an electoral ward in the Royal Borough of Kensington and Chelsea. The ward has existed since the creation of the borough on 1 April 1965 and first used in the 1964 elections. It returns councillors to Kensington and Chelsea London Borough Council.

== Kensington and Chelsea council elections since 2014 ==
There was a revision of ward boundaries in Kensington and Chelsea in 2014.

=== 2024 by-election ===
The by-election was held on 2 May 2024, following the resignation of Stuart Graham. It took place on the same day as the 2024 London mayoral election, the 2024 London Assembly election and 14 other borough council by-elections across London.

2024 Norland by-election
| Party | Candidate | Votes | % | ±% |
|---|---|---|---|---|
| Conservative | Stéphanie Petit | 902 | 51.0 | |
| Labour | Monica Press | 514 | 29.1 | |
| Liberal Democrats | Finlay Dargan | 229 | 13.0 | |
| Green | Heloise Hunter | 123 | 7.0 | |
| Majority | | 388 | 22.0 | |
| Turnout | | 1,768 | 46.2 | |
| Conservative hold | | Swing | | |

=== 2022 election ===
The election took place on 5 May 2022.

2022 Kensington and Chelsea London Borough Council election: Norland
| Party | Candidate | Votes | % | ±% |
|---|---|---|---|---|
| Conservative | David Lindsay | 787 | 49.2 | −9.6 |
| Conservative | Stuart Graham | 738 | 46.2 | −11.3 |
| Labour | Sylvia Parnell | 355 | 22.2 | −1.6 |
| Green | Fabien Frenzel | 338 | 21.1 | N/A |
| Green | Angela Georgievski | 299 | 18.7 | N/A |
| Labour | Bernard Shaw | 289 | 18.1 | −3.0 |
| Liberal Democrats | Tom Fox | 162 | 10.1 | −1.8 |
| Liberal Democrats | Blanche Girouard | 157 | 9.8 | −0.6 |
| Turnout | | | 41.6 | |
| Conservative hold | | Swing | | |
| Conservative hold | | Swing | | |
