= Pembridge (ward) =

Electoral ward in London, England

- Electoral ward for the Kensington and Chelsea London Borough Council
- Borough: Kensington and Chelsea
- County: Greater London
- Population: 5,379 (2021)
- Area: 0.3961 km²

Current electoral ward
- Created: 1965
- Councillors: 2 (since 2014); 3 (1974 to 2014); 6 (1964 to 1974)

Pembridge is an electoral ward in the Royal Borough of Kensington and Chelsea. The ward was first used in the 1964 elections and elects three councillors to Kensington and Chelsea London Borough Council.

== Geography ==
The ward is named after the Pembridge area.

== Councillors ==
Election	Councillors	
2022	Joanna Gardner (Conservative)	Dori Schmetterling (Conservative)

== Elections ==
=== 2022 ===
Pembridge (2)
Party	Candidate	Votes	%	±%
Conservative	Joanna Gardner	609	46.8	−6.9
Conservative	Dori Schmetterling	560	43.0	−7.8
Liberal Democrats	Sam Dodgshon	448	34.4	+17.6
Labour	Lorna Kelly	393	30.1	+1.5
Labour	Jonathan Daniels	386	29.6	+4.7
Turnout			36.5	
Conservative hold		Swing		
Conservative hold		Swing		

== See also ==
- List of electoral wards in Greater London
