= Abingdon (ward) =

Electoral ward in London, England

- Electoral ward for the Kensington and Chelsea London Borough Council
- Borough: Kensington and Chelsea
- County: Greater London
- Population: 7,894 (2021)
- Area: 0.5858 km²

Current electoral ward
- Created: 1974
- Councillors: 3

Abingdon is an electoral ward in the Royal Borough of Kensington and Chelsea. The ward was first used in the 1974 elections and elects three councillors to Kensington and Chelsea London Borough Council.

== Geography ==
The ward is named after the Abingdon road area.

=== Demography ===
The ward has a population of 9,643 residents and is the 7th highest populated ward in the borough according to 2011 census. Abingdon has a population density of 158.8 people per square hectare, ranked 5th highest and compares to 130.8 in Borough.

English is the dominant language used with 66.8% of residents (6,182). 6.0% of residents speak French as a first language, 4.% speak Arabic and 3.1% speak Spanish as a first language.

== Councillors ==
Election	Councillors		
2022	Sarah Addenbrooke (Conservative)	Anne Cyron (Conservative)	James Husband (Conservative)

== Elections ==
=== 2022 ===
Abingdon (3)
Party	Candidate	Votes	%	±%
Conservative	Sarah Addenbrooke	1,019	60.0	−6.2
Conservative	Anne Cyron	964	56.5	−5.9
Conservative	James Husband	915	53.6	−8.1
Labour	Manju Gregory	374	21.9	+4.4
Labour	Nasrin Lari	342	20.0	+3.0
Liberal Democrats	Jeremy Good	335	19.6	+5.0
Labour	Bora Ristic	335	19.6	+4.4
Liberal Democrats	Jonathan Owen	330	19.3	+5.1
Liberal Democrats	Peter Kosta	279	16.3	+0.2
Turnout			32.2	
Conservative hold		Swing		
Conservative hold		Swing		
Conservative hold		Swing		

== See also ==
- List of electoral wards in Greater London
