= Holland (ward) =

Electoral ward in London, England

- Electoral ward for the Kensington and Chelsea London Borough Council
- Borough: Kensington and Chelsea
- County: Greater London
- Population: 9,102 (2021)
- Major settlements: Holland Park
- Area: 0.9599 km²

Current electoral ward
- Created: 1965
- Councillors: 3 (since 1974); 6 (until 1974)

Holland is an electoral ward in the Royal Borough of Kensington and Chelsea. The ward was first used in the 1964 elections and elects three councillors to Kensington and Chelsea London Borough Council.

== Geography ==
The ward is named after the Holland Park area.

== Councillors ==
Election	Councillors		
2022	Lucinda (Lucy) Knight (Conservative)	Johnny Thalassites (Conservative)	Aarien Areti (Conservative)

== Elections ==
=== 2022 ===
Holland (3)
Party	Candidate	Votes	%	±%
Conservative	Lucinda Knight	1,049	52.1	−0.2
Conservative	Johnny Thalassites	1,019	50.6	+0.5
Conservative	Aarien Areti	993	49.3	−3.5
Labour	Samantha Batra	731	36.3	+2.9
Labour	Nathaniel McBride	654	32.5	+2.4
Labour	Axel Landin	650	32.3	+0.4
Liberal Democrats	Hugh Lalor	241	12.0	+0.9
Liberal Democrats	Noel McNamara	241	12.0	−1.3
Liberal Democrats	Leopold Rupf	189	9.4	N/A
Turnout			35.9	
Conservative hold		Swing		
Conservative hold		Swing		
Conservative hold		Swing		

== See also ==
- List of electoral wards in Greater London
