= Courtfield (ward) =

Electoral ward in London, England

- Electoral ward for the Kensington and Chelsea London Borough Council
- Borough: Kensington and Chelsea
- County: Greater London
- Population: 8,332 (2021)
- Area: 0.7114 km²

Current electoral ward
- Created: 1974
- Councillors: 3

Courtfield is an electoral ward in the Royal Borough of Kensington and Chelsea. The ward was first used in the 1974 elections and elects three councillors to Kensington and Chelsea London Borough Council.

== Councillors ==
Election	Councillors		
2022	Janet Evans (Conservative)	Gregory Hammond (Conservative)	Quentin Marshall (Conservative)

== Elections ==
=== 2022 ===
Courtfield (3)
Party	Candidate	Votes	%	±%
Conservative	Janet Evans	1,068	59.6	−9.4
Conservative	Greg Hammond	1,037	57.8	−10.3
Conservative	Quentin Marshall	947	52.8	−13.8
Liberal Democrats	Marc Goldfinger	740	41.3	+27.1
Labour	Fatima Kara	282	15.7	+4.0
Labour	Marius Brill	270	15.1	+4.4
Labour	Rene Gimpel	270	15.1	+2.4
Turnout			32.8	
Conservative hold		Swing		
Conservative hold		Swing		
Conservative hold		Swing		

== See also ==
- List of electoral wards in Greater London
