= Kensington and Chelsea London Borough Council =

Local authority in London

- Coat of arms

- Council logo

Type
- Type: London borough council of the Royal Borough of Kensington and Chelsea
- Houses: Unicameral

History
- Founded: 1 April 1965

Leadership
- Mayor: Janet Evans, Conservative since 27 May 2026
- Leader: Elizabeth Campbell, Conservative since 19 July 2017
- Chief Executive: Maxine Holdsworth since 2022

Structure
- Seats: 50 councillors
- Political groups: Administration (34) Conservative (34) Opposition (16) Labour (13) Liberal Democrats (3)
- Length of term: Whole council elected every four years

Elections
- Voting system: Plurality at-large (FPTP)
- Last election: 7 May 2026
- Next election: 2 May 2030

Meeting place
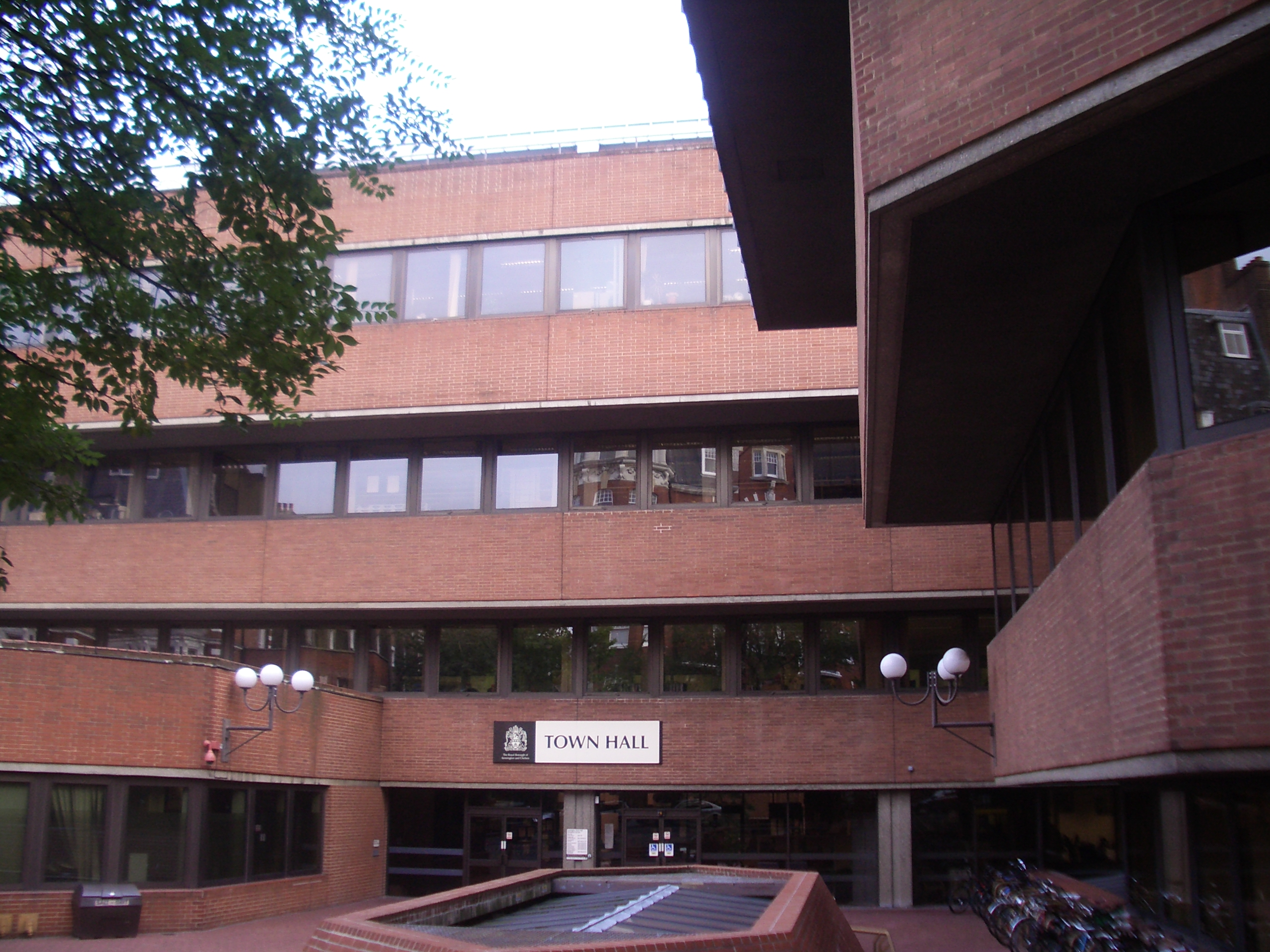
- Kensington Town Hall, Hornton Street, London, W8 7NX

Website
- www.rbkc.gov.uk

Kensington and Chelsea London Borough Council, also known as Kensington and Chelsea Council, is the local authority for the Royal Borough of Kensington and Chelsea in Greater London, England. The council has been under Conservative majority control since its creation in 1965. It is based at Kensington Town Hall.

== History ==
The Royal Borough of Kensington and Chelsea and its council were created under the London Government Act 1963, with the first election held in 1964. For its first year the council acted as a shadow authority alongside the area's outgoing authorities, being the councils of the two metropolitan boroughs of Chelsea and Kensington. The new council formally came into its powers on 1 April 1965, at which point the old boroughs and their councils were abolished.

The old borough of Kensington had held the honorific title of royal borough since 1901. The royal borough status was transferred to the new borough created in 1965, and so the modern council's full legal name is the "Mayor and Burgesses of the Royal Borough of Kensington and Chelsea", although it styles itself Kensington and Chelsea Council or RBKC.

From 1965 until 1986 the council was a lower-tier authority, with upper-tier functions provided by the Greater London Council. The split of powers and functions meant that the Greater London Council was responsible for "wide area" services such as fire, ambulance, flood prevention, and refuse disposal; with the boroughs (including Kensington and Chelsea) responsible for "personal" services such as social care, libraries, cemeteries and refuse collection. The Greater London Council was abolished in 1986 and its functions passed to the London Boroughs, with some services provided through joint committees. Kensington and Chelsea became a local education authority in 1990 when the Inner London Education Authority was dissolved.

Since 2000 the Greater London Authority has taken some responsibility for highways and planning control from the council, but within the English local government system the council remains a "most purpose" authority in terms of the available range of powers and functions.

== Powers and functions ==
The local authority derives its powers and functions from the London Government Act 1963 and subsequent legislation, and has the powers and functions of a London borough council. It sets council tax and as a billing authority also collects business rates and precepts for Greater London Authority functions. It sets planning policies which complement Greater London Authority and national policies, and decides on almost all planning applications accordingly. It is also the local education authority.

== Political control ==
The first election was held in 1964, initially operating as a shadow authority alongside the outgoing authorities until it came into its powers on 1 April 1965. The Conservatives have held a majority of the seats on the council since its creation.

Party in control	Years
Conservative	1965–present

=== Leadership ===
The role of mayor is largely ceremonial in Kensington and Chelsea. Political leadership is instead provided by the leader of the council. The leaders since 1965 have been:

Councillor	Party	From	To
Ernest Anslow-Wilson	Conservative	1965	12 Apr 1968
Malby Crofton	Conservative	12 Apr 1968	9 Dec 1977
Nicholas Freeman	Conservative	9 Dec 1977	11 Apr 1989
Joan Hanham	Conservative	11 Apr 1989	12 Apr 2000
Merrick Cockell	Conservative	12 Apr 2000	22 May 2013
Nicholas Paget-Brown	Conservative	22 May 2013	30 Jun 2017
Elizabeth Campbell	Conservative	19 Jul 2017	

=== Composition ===
Following the 2026 election, the composition of the council is as follows:

Party	Councillors
Conservative	34
Labour	13
Liberal Democrats	3
Total	50

The next election is due in May 2030.

== Wards ==
The wards of Kensington and Chelsea and the number of seats:

1. Abingdon (3)
2. Brompton & Hans Town (3)
3. Campden (3)
4. Chelsea Riverside (3)
5. Colville (3)
6. Courtfield (3)
7. Dalgarno (2)
8. Earl's Court (3)
9. Golborne (3)
10. Holland (3)
11. Norland (2)
12. Notting Dale (3)
13. Pembridge (2)
14. Queen's Gate (3)
15. Redcliffe (3)
16. Royal Hospital (3)
17. St Helen's (2)
18. Stanley (3)

== Elections ==
Since the last boundary changes in 2014 the council has comprised 50 councillors representing 18 wards, with each ward electing two or three councillors. Elections are held every four years.

== Premises ==
The council is based at Kensington Town Hall on Horton Street, which was purpose-built for the council to the designs of Basil Spence between 1972 and 1976 and opened in 1977.

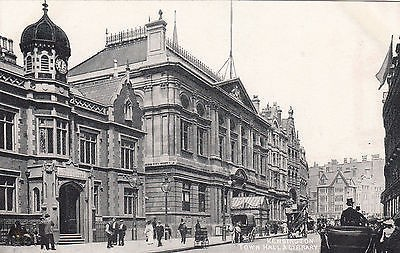
Old Town Hall, Kensington: Council's headquarters until 1977, demolished in controversial circumstances in 1982.

Prior to 1977 the council's functions were split between several buildings, notably including the Old Town Hall on Kensington High Street and Chelsea Town Hall on King's Road, both of which had been inherited from its predecessor councils. The council held its meetings at the Old Town Hall in Kensington.

In 1982 the then leader of the council, Nicholas Freeman, provoked a storm of opposition amongst people of all political persuasions by ordering the overnight destruction of Kensington's Old Town Hall, which had been completed in 1880. The government had refused a planning appeal for the site's redevelopment, and the Greater London Council had signalled that it was about to designate a conservation area covering the Old Town Hall and surrounding area, after which demolition works in the area would require planning permission. Starting in the early hours of Saturday 12 June, two days after the planning appeal was dismissed, the façade of the Old Town Hall was demolished.

The Royal Fine Art Commission condemned the action as "official vandalism... decided upon covertly, implemented without warning and timed deliberately to thwart known opposition". The Kensington Society predicted that the council would be "completely condemned" for its actions and a journalist writing in The Times recorded the council as being "deeply shamed for the example it had set to other listed-building owners". Demolition work was temporarily halted, but in 1984 it was decided that the building was beyond repair and the rest of the building was demolished and the site redeveloped.

== Grenfell Tower fire ==
On 14 June 2017, a major fire destroyed the council-owned, 24-storey Grenfell Tower, a public housing building in the mainly working-class area of North Kensington, causing 72 deaths. The tower block was managed on behalf of (but independently of) the council by Kensington and Chelsea Tenant Management Organisation (KCTMO), the largest tenant management organisation (TMO) in England, which is responsible for the management of nearly 10,000 properties in the borough.

On 15 June, Kensington and Chelsea invoked the help of the other London boroughs in supporting the survivors. Responsibility was handed over to a Grenfell fire-response team led by a group of chief executives from councils across London. Resources available to them included central government, the British Red Cross, the Metropolitan Police, the London Fire Brigade and local government across London. Neighbouring councils sent in staff to improve the rehousing response.

On 21 June, the council chief executive Nicholas Holgate resigned amid criticism over the borough's response to the fire. The Prime Minister Theresa May commented that the council "couldn't cope" in the response to the fire, and that it "was right" that the chief executive had resigned. The Conservative leader of the council, Nicholas Paget-Brown, initially resisted calls to resign, but announced on 30 June that he would step down. He was replaced as leader by Conservative councillor Elizabeth Campbell on 19 July 2017. Lewisham Council's chief executive, Barry Quirk, was seconded to take over from Nicholas Holgate in June and took up the chief executive role on a permanent basis in September 2017.
