= List of electoral wards in Greater London =

This is a list of electoral areas and wards in the ceremonial county and English region of Greater London. All changes since the re-organisation of local government following the passing of the London Government Act 1963 are shown. The number of councillors, common councilmen or assembly members elected for each electoral area or ward is shown in brackets.

== London borough councils ==
The 32 London boroughs have been divided into 679 electoral wards since May 2022.

=== Barking and Dagenham ===
Wards from 1 April 1965 (first election 7 May 1964) to 4 May 1978:

1. Abbey (4)
2. Cambell (4)
3. Chadwell Heath (4)
4. Eastbrook (4)
5. Fanshawe (4)
6. Gascoigne (4)
7. Heath (5)
8. Longbridge (4)
9. Manor (4)
10. River (4)
11. Valence (4)
12. Village (4)

Wards from 4 May 1978 to 2 May 2002:

1. Abbey (3)
2. Alibon (2)
3. Cambell (3)
4. Chadwell Heath (3)
5. Eastbrook (3)
6. Eastbury (2)
7. Fanshawe (3)
8. Gascoigne (3)
9. Goresbrook (2)
10. Heath (3)
11. Longbridge (3)
12. Manor (2)
13. Marks Gate (1); changed to (2) in 1994
14. Parsloes (2)
15. River (2)
16. Thames (2)
17. Triptons (3)
18. Valence (3)
19. Village (3)
20. Becontree (2); new ward added in 1994

Wards from 2 May 2002 to 5 May 2022:

1. Abbey (3)
2. Alibon (3)
3. Becontree (3)
4. Chadwell Heath (3)
5. Eastbrook (3)
6. Eastbury (3)
7. Gascoigne (3)
8. Goresbrook (3)
9. Heath (3)
10. Longbridge (3)
11. Mayesbrook (3)
12. Parsloes (3)
13. River (3)
14. Thames (3)
15. Valence (3)
16. Village (3)
17. Whalebone (3)

Wards from 5 May 2022:

1. Abbey (2)
2. Alibon (2)
3. Barking Riverside (3)
4. Beam (3)
5. Becontree (2)
6. Chadwell Heath (3)
7. Eastbrook & Rush Green (2)
8. Eastbury (3)
9. Gascoigne (3)
10. Goresbrook (3)
11. Heath (2)
12. Longbridge (3)
13. Mayesbrook (3)
14. Northbury (3)
15. Parsloes (3)
16. Thames View (2)
17. Valence (3)
18. Village (3)
19. Whalebone (3)

=== Barnet ===
Wards from 1 April 1965 (first election 7 May 1964) to 9 May 1968:

1. Arkley East (1)
2. Arkley West (1)
3. Barnet North (1)
4. Barnet South (1)
5. Brunswick Park (1)
6. Burnt Oak (3)
7. Child's Hill (3)
8. Cockfosters (1)
9. East Barnet (1)
10. Edgware (3)
11. Finchley Central (3)
12. Finchley East (3)
13. Finchley North (3)
14. Finchley West (3)
15. Friern Barnet Central (1)
16. Friern Barnet East (1)
17. Friern Barnet North (1)
18. Friern Barnet South (1)
19. Friern Barnet West (1)
20. Garden Suburb (3)
21. Golders Green (3)
22. Hadley (1)
23. Hendon Central (3)
24. Lyonsdown (1)
25. Mill Hill (3)
26. New Barnet (1)
27. Osidge (1)
28. Park (3)
29. Totteridge (1)
30. West Hendon (3)

Wards from 9 May 1968 to 2 May 2002:

1. Arkley (3)
2. Brunswick Park (3)
3. Burnt Oak (3)
4. Childs Hill (3)
5. Colindale (3)
6. East Barnet (3)
7. East Finchley (3)
8. Edgware (3)
9. Finchley (3)
10. Friern Barnet (3)
11. Garden Suburb (3)
12. Golders Green (3)
13. Hadley (3)
14. Hale (3)
15. Hendon (3)
16. Mill Hill (3)
17. St Paul's (3)
18. Totteridge (3)
19. West Hendon (3)
20. Woodhouse (3)

Wards from 2 May 2002 to 5 May 2022:

1. Brunswick Park (3)
2. Burnt Oak (3)
3. Childs Hill (3)
4. Colindale (3)
5. Coppetts (3)
6. East Finchley (3)
7. East Barnet (3)
8. Edgware (3)
9. Finchley Church End (3)
10. Garden Suburb (3)
11. Golders Green (3)
12. Hale (3)
13. Hendon (3)
14. High Barnet (3)
15. Mill Hill (3)
16. Oakleigh (3)
17. Totteridge (3)
18. Underhill (3)
19. West Finchley (3)
20. West Hendon (3)
21. Woodhouse (3)

Wards from 5 May 2022:

1. Barnet Vale (3)
2. Brunswick Park (3)
3. Burnt Oak (3)
4. Childs Hill (3)
5. Colindale North (2)
6. Colindale South (3)
7. Cricklewood (2)
8. East Barnet (3)
9. East Finchley (3)
10. Edgware (3)
11. Edgwarebury (2)
12. Finchley Church End (3)
13. Friern Barnet (3)
14. Garden Suburb (2)
15. Golders Green (2)
16. Hendon (3)
17. High Barnet (2)
18. Mill Hill (3)
19. Totteridge and Woodside (3)
20. Underhill (2)
21. West Finchley (3)
22. West Hendon (3)
23. Whetstone (2)
24. Woodhouse (2)

=== Bexley ===
Wards from 1 April 1965 (first election 7 May 1964) to 4 May 1978:

1. Belvedere (3)
2. Bostall (3)
3. Brampton (3)
4. Christchurch (3)
5. Crayford North (3)
6. Crayford Town (3)
7. Crayford West (2)
8. Danson (3)
9. East Wickham (3)
10. Erith Town (3)
11. Falconwood (2)
12. Lamorbey East (3)
13. Lamorbey West (4)
14. North Cray (1)
15. Northumberland Heath (3)
16. St Mary's (4)
17. St Michael's (3)
18. Sidcup East (3)
19. Sidcup West (2)
20. Upton (2)
21. Thamesmead East (3); new ward added in 1974

Wards from 4 May 1978 to 2 May 2002:

1. Barnehurst (2)
2. Barnehurst North (1)
3. Belvedere (3)
4. Blackfen (2)
5. Blendon and Penhill (3)
6. Bostall (3)
7. Brampton (3)
8. Christchurch (3)
9. Cray (2)
10. Crayford (3)
11. Danson (3)
12. East Wickham (3)
13. Erith (3)
14. Falconwood (1)
15. Lamorbey (3)
16. North End (3)
17. Northumberland Heath (3)
18. St Mary's (3)
19. St Michael's (3)
20. Sidcup East (3)
21. Sidcup West (3)
22. Thamesmead East (3)
23. Upton (3)

Wards from 2 May 2002 to 3 May 2018:

1. Barnehurst (3)
2. Belvedere (3)
3. Blackfen & Lamorbey (3)
4. Blendon & Penhill (3)
5. Brampton (3)
6. Christchurch (3)
7. Colyers (3)
8. Crayford (3)
9. Cray Meadows (3)
10. Danson Park (3)
11. East Wickham (3)
12. Erith (3)
13. Falconwood & Welling (3)
14. Lesnes Abbey (3)
15. Longlands (3)
16. North End (3)
17. Northumberland Heath (3)
18. St Mary's (3)
19. St Michael's (3)
20. Sidcup (3)
21. Thamesmead East (3)

Wards from 3 May 2018 to present:

1. Barnehurst (2)
2. Belvedere (3)
3. Bexleyheath (3)
4. Blackfen & Lamorbey (3)
5. Blendon & Penhill (3)
6. Crayford (3)
7. Crook Log (3)
8. East Wickham (3)
9. Erith (2)
10. Falconwood & Welling (3)
11. Longlands (2)
12. Northumberland Heath (2)
13. Sidcup (3)
14. Slade Green & Northend (2)
15. St Mary's & St James (2)
16. Thamesmead East (3)
17. West Heath (3)

=== Brent ===
Wards from 1 April 1965 (first election 7 May 1964) to 9 May 1968:

1. Alperton (3)
2. Barham (3)
3. Brentwater (2)
4. Brondesbury Park (2)
5. Carlton (2)
6. Chalkhill (3)
7. Chamberlayne (2)
8. Church End (2)
9. Cricklewood (2)
10. Gladstone (2)
11. Harlesden (2)
12. Kensal Rise (2)
13. Kenton (3)
14. Kilburn (2)
15. Kingsbury (3)
16. Manor (2)
17. Mapesbury (2)
18. Preston (3)
19. Queensbury (2)
20. Queen's Park (2)
21. Roundwood (2)
22. St Raphael's (2)
23. Stonebridge (2)
24. Sudbury (3)
25. Tokyngton (3)
26. Willesden Green (2)

Wards from 9 May 1968 to 4 May 1978:

1. Alperton (2)
2. Barham (2)
3. Brentwater (2)
4. Brondesbury Park (2)
5. Carlton (2)
6. Chamberlayne (2)
7. Church End (2)
8. Cricklewood (2)
9. Fryent (2)
10. Gladstone (2)
11. Harlesden (2)
12. Kensal Rise (2)
13. Kenton (2)
14. Kilburn (2)
15. Kingsbury (2)
16. Manor (2)
17. Mapesbury (2)
18. Preston (1)
19. Queensbury (2)
20. Queens Park (2)
21. Roe Green (2)
22. Roundwood (2)
23. St Raphael's (2)
24. Stonebridge (2)
25. Sudbury (2)
26. Sudbury Court (1)
27. Tokyngton (2)
28. Town Hall (2)
29. Wembley Central (2)
30. Wembley Park (2)
31. Willesden Green (2)

Wards from 4 May 1978 to 2 May 2002:

1. Alperton (2)
2. Barham (3); changed to (2) in 1994
3. Barnhill (2)
4. Brentwater (2)
5. Brondesbury Park (2)
6. Carlton (2)
7. Chamberlayne (2)
8. Church End (2)
9. Cricklewood (2)
10. Fryent (2)
11. Gladstone (2)
12. Harlesden (2)
13. Kensal Rise (2)
14. Kenton (2)
15. Kilburn (2)
16. Kingsbury (2)
17. Manor (2)
18. Mapesbury (2)
19. Preston (3)
20. Queen's Park (2)
21. Queensbury (2)
22. Roe Green (2)
23. Roundwood (2)
24. St Andrew's (2)
25. St Raphael's (3)
26. Stonebridge (2)
27. Sudbury (2); changed to (3) in 1994
28. Sudbury Court (2)
29. Tokyngton (3)
30. Wembley Central (2)
31. Willesden Green (2)

Wards from 2 May 2002 to 5 May 2022:

1. Alperton (3)
2. Barnhill (3)
3. Brondesbury Park (3)
4. Dollis Hill (3)
5. Dudden Hill (3)
6. Fryent (3)
7. Harlesden (3)
8. Kensal Green (3)
9. Kenton (3)
10. Kilburn (3)
11. Mapesbury (3)
12. Northwick Park (3)
13. Preston (3)
14. Queens Park (3)
15. Queensbury (3)
16. Stonebridge (3)
17. Sudbury (3)
18. Tokyngton (3)
19. Welsh Harp (3)
20. Wembley Central (3)
21. Willesden Green (3)

Wards from 5 May 2022:

1. Alperton (3)
2. Barnhill (2)
3. Brondesbury Park (2)
4. Cricklewood & Mapesbury (2)
5. Dollis Hill (3)
6. Harlesden & Kensal Green (3)
7. Kenton (3)
8. Kilburn (3)
9. Kingsbury (2)
10. Northwick Park (2)
11. Preston (2)
12. Queens Park (3)
13. Queensbury (3)
14. Roundwood (3)
15. Stonebridge (3)
16. Sudbury (2)
17. Tokyngton (2)
18. Welsh Harp (3)
19. Wembley Central (3)
20. Wembley Hill (3)
21. Wembley Park (2)
22. Willesden Green (3)

=== Bromley ===
Wards from 1 April 1965 (first election 7 May 1964) to 4 May 1978:

1. Anerley (2)
2. Bickley (3)
3. Biggin Hill (2)
4. Bromley Common (3)
5. Chelsfield (2)
6. Chislehurst (3)
7. Clock House (2)
8. Copers Cope (2)
9. Darwin (1)
10. Eden Park (2)
11. Farnborough (3)
12. Goddington (3)
13. Keston & Hayes (3)
14. Lawrie Park & Kent House (2)
15. Manor House (2)
16. Martins Hill & Town (3)
17. Mottingham (2)
18. Penge (3)
19. Petts Wood (3)
20. Plaistow & Sundridge (3)
21. St Mary Cray (2)
22. St Paul's Cray (3)
23. Shortlands (2)
24. West Wickham North (2)
25. West Wickham South (2)

Wards from 4 May 1978 to 2 May 2002:

1. Anerley (2)
2. Bickley (3)
3. Biggin Hill (2)
4. Bromley Common & Keston (3)
5. Chelsfield & Goddington (3)
6. Chislehurst (3)
7. Clock House (2)
8. Copers Cope (2)
9. Crofton (2)
10. Darwin (1)
11. Eden Park (2)
12. Farnborough (2)
13. Hayes (3)
14. Kelsey Park (2)
15. Lawrie Park & Kent House (2)
16. Martins Hill & Town (2)
17. Mottingham (2)
18. Orpington Central (2)
19. Penge (2)
20. Petts Wood & Knoll (3)
21. Plaistow & Sundridge (3)
22. St Mary Cray (3)
23. St Paul's Cray (3)
24. Shortlands (2)
25. West Wickham North (2)
26. West Wickham South (2)

Wards from 2 May 2002 to 5 May 2022:

1. Bickley (3)
2. Biggin Hill (2)
3. Bromley Common & Keston (3)
4. Bromley Town (3)
5. Chelsfield & Pratts Bottom (3)
6. Chislehurst (3)
7. Clock House (3)
8. Copers Cope (3)
9. Cray Valley East (3)
10. Cray Valley West (3)
11. Crystal Palace (2)
12. Darwin (1)
13. Farnborough & Crofton (3)
14. Hayes & Coney Hall (3)
15. Kelsey & Eden Park (3)
16. Mottingham & Chislehurst North (2)
17. Orpington (3)
18. Penge & Cator (3)
19. Petts Wood & Knoll (3)
20. Plaistow & Sundridge (3)
21. Shortlands (2)
22. West Wickham (3)

Wards from 5 May 2022:

1. Beckenham Town & Copers Cope (3)
2. Bickley & Sundridge (3)
3. Biggin Hill (2)
4. Bromley Common & Holwood (3)
5. Bromley Town (3)
6. Chelsfield (2)
7. Chislehurst (3)
8. Clock House (3)
9. Crystal Palace & Anerley (2)
10. Darwin (1)
11. Farnborough & Crofton (3)
12. Hayes & Coney Hall (3)
13. Kelsey & Eden Park (3)
14. Mottingham (3)
15. Orpington (2)
16. Penge & Cator (3)
17. Petts Wood & Knoll (3)
18. Plaistow (2)
19. Shortlands & Park Langley (3)
20. St Mary Cray (3)
21. St Paul's Cray (3)
22. West Wickham (3)

=== Camden ===
Wards from 1 April 1965 (first election 7 May 1964) to 13 May 1971:

1. Adelaide (4)
2. Belsize (4)
3. Bloomsbury (3)
4. Camden (4)
5. Chalk Farm (2)
6. Euston (2)
7. Gospel Oak (2)
8. Grafton (4)
9. Hampstead Central (3)
10. Hampstead Town (3)
11. Highgate (3)
12. Holborn (3)
13. Kilburn (3)
14. King's Cross (3)
15. Priory (4)
16. Regent's Park (3)
17. St John's (3)
18. St Pancras (4)
19. West End (3)

Wards from 13 May 1971 to 4 May 1978:

1. Adelaide (4)
2. Belsize (4)
3. Bloomsbury (3)
4. Camden (4)
5. Chalk Farm (2)
6. Gospel Oak (2)
7. Grafton (4)
8. Hampstead Town (4)
9. Highgate (3)
10. Holborn (2)
11. Kilburn (3)
12. King's Cross (4)
13. Priory (3)
14. Regent's Park (4)
15. St John's (3)
16. St Pancras (3)
17. Swiss Cottage (4)
18. West End (4)

Wards from 4 May 1978 to 2 May 2002:

1. Adelaide (3)
2. Belsize (3)
3. Bloomsbury (3)
4. Brunswick (2)
5. Camden (2)
6. Castlehaven (2)
7. Caversham (2)
8. Chalk Farm (2)
9. Fitzjohns (2)
10. Fortune Green (2)
11. Frognal (2)
12. Gospel Oak (2)
13. Grafton (2)
14. Hampstead Town (2)
15. Highgate (3)
16. Holborn (2)
17. Kilburn (3)
18. King's Cross (2)
19. Priory (2)
20. Regent's Park (3)
21. St John's (2)
22. St Pancras (2)
23. Somers Town (2)
24. South End (2)
25. Swiss Cottage (3)
26. West End (2)

Wards from 2 May 2002 to 5 May 2022:

1. Belsize (3)
2. Bloomsbury (3)
3. Camden Town with Primrose Hill (3)
4. Cantelowes (3)
5. Fortune Green (3)
6. Frognal & Fitzjohns (3)
7. Gospel Oak (3)
8. Hampstead Town (3)
9. Haverstock (3)
10. Highgate (3)
11. Holborn & Covent Garden (3)
12. Kentish Town (3)
13. Kilburn (3)
14. King's Cross (3)
15. Regent's Park (3)
16. St Pancras & Somers Town (3)
17. Swiss Cottage (3)
18. West Hampstead (3)

Wards from 5 May 2022:

1. Belsize (3)
2. Bloomsbury (3)
3. Camden Square (2)
4. Camden Town (2)
5. Fortune Green (3)
6. Frognal (2)
7. Gospel Oak (3)
8. Hampstead Town (2)
9. Haverstock (3)
10. Highgate (3)
11. Holborn & Covent Garden (3)
12. Kentish Town North (2)
13. Kentish Town South (3)
14. Kilburn (3)
15. King's Cross (3)
16. Primrose Hill (3)
17. Regent's Park (3)
18. South Hampstead (3)
19. St Pancras & Somers Town (3)
20. West Hampstead (3)

=== Croydon ===
Wards from 1 April 1965 (first election 7 May 1964) to 4 May 1978:

1. Addiscombe (3)
2. Bensham Manor (3)
3. Broad Green (3)
4. Central (3)
5. Coulsdon East(3)
6. East (3)
7. New Addington (3)
8. Norbury (3)
9. Purley (3)
10. Sanderstead and Selsdon (3)
11. Sanderstead North (3)
12. Shirley (3)
13. South Norwood (3)
14. Thornton Heath (3)
15. Upper Norwood (3)
16. Waddon(3)
17. West Thornton (3)
18. Whitehorse Manor (3)
19. Woodcote and Coulsdon West (3)
20. Woodside (3)

Wards from 4 May 1978 to 2 May 2002:

1. Addiscombe (3)
2. Ashburton (2)
3. Bensham Manor (3)
4. Beulah (2)
5. Broad Green (3)
6. Coulsdon East (3)
7. Croham (3)
8. Fairfield (3)
9. Fieldway (2)
10. Heathfield (3)
11. Kenley (2)
12. Monks Orchard (2)
13. New Addington (3)
14. Norbury (3)
15. Purley (3)
16. Rylands (2)
17. Sanderstead (2)
18. Selsdon (2)
19. South Norwood (3)
20. Spring Park (2)
21. Thornton Heath (3)
22. Upper Norwood (2)
23. Waddon (3)
24. West Thornton (3)
25. Whitehorse Manor (3)
26. Woodcote and Coulsdon West (3)
27. Woodside (2)

Wards from 2 May 2002 to 3 May 2018:

1. Addiscombe (3)
2. Ashburton (3)
3. Bensham Manor (3)
4. Broad Green (3)
5. Coulsdon East (3)
6. Coulsdon West (3)
7. Croham (3)
8. Fairfield (3)
9. Fieldway (2)
10. Heathfield (3)
11. Kenley (3)
12. New Addington (2)
13. Norbury (3)
14. Purley (3)
15. Sanderstead (3)
16. Selhurst (3)
17. Selsdon and Ballards (3)
18. Shirley (3)
19. South Norwood (3)
20. Thornton Heath(3)
21. Upper Norwood (3)
22. Waddon (3)
23. West Thornton (3)
24. Woodside (3)

Wards from 3 May 2018:

1. Addiscombe East (2)
2. Addiscombe West (3)
3. Bensham Manor(3)
4. Broad Green(3)
5. Coulsdon Town (3)
6. Crystal Palace and Upper Norwood (3)
7. Fairfield (3)
8. Kenley (2)
9. New Addington North (2)
10. New Addington South (2)
11. Norbury and Pollards Hill (2)
12. Norbury Park (2)
13. Old Coulsdon (2)
14. Park Hill and Whitgift (1)
15. Purley and Woodcote (3)
16. Purley Oaks and Riddlesdown (2)
17. Sanderstead (3)
18. Selhurst (2)
19. Selsdon and Addington Village (2)
20. Selsdon Vale and Forestdale (2)
21. Shirley North (3)
22. Shirley South (2)
23. South Croydon (3)
24. South Norwood (3)
25. Thornton Heath (3)
26. Waddon(3)
27. West Thornton (3)
28. Woodside (3)

=== Ealing ===
Wards from 1 April 1965 (first election 7 May 1964) to 4 May 1978:

1. Brent (3)
2. Central (3)
3. Cleveland (3)
4. Dormers Wells (3)
5. East (3)
6. Elthorne (3)
7. Glebe (3)
8. Hanger Hill (3)
9. Heathfield (3)
10. Horsenden (3)
11. Mandeville (3)
12. Northcote (3)
13. Northfields (3)
14. Perivale (3)
15. Ravenor (3)
16. Southfield (3)
17. Springfield (3)
18. Walpole (3)
19. Waxlow Manor (3)
20. West End (3)

Wards from 4 May 1978 to 2 May 2002:

1. Argyle (3)
2. Costons (3)
3. Dormers Wells (3)
4. Ealing Common (3)
5. Elthorne (3)
6. Glebe (3)
7. Hanger Lane (3)
8. Heathfield (3)
9. Hobbayne (3)
10. Mandeville (3)
11. Mount Pleasant (3)
12. Northcote (3)
13. Northfield (3)
14. Perivale (3); changed to (2) in 1994
15. Pitshanger (3)
16. Ravenor (3)
17. Southfield (3)
18. Springfield (3)
19. Vale (2)
20. Victoria (2)
21. Walpole (3)
22. Waxlow (3)
23. West End (3)
24. Wood End (3)
25. Horsenden (2); new ward added in 1994

Wards from 2 May 2002 to 5 May 2022:

1. Acton Central (3)
2. Cleveland (3)
3. Dormers Wells (3)
4. Ealing Broadway (3)
5. Ealing Common (3)
6. East Acton (3)
7. Elthorne (3)
8. Greenford Broadway (3)
9. Greenford Green (3)
10. Hanger Hill (3)
11. Hobbayne (3)
12. Lady Margaret (3)
13. Northfield (3)
14. North Greenford (3)
15. Northolt Mandeville (3)
16. Northolt West End (3)
17. Norwood Green (3)
18. Perivale (3)
19. South Acton (3)
20. Southall Broadway (3)
21. Southall Green (3)
22. Southfield (3)
23. Walpole (3)

Wards from 5 May 2022:

1. Central Greenford (3)
2. Dormers Wells (3)
3. Ealing Broadway (3)
4. Ealing Common (3)
5. East Acton (3)
6. Greenford Broadway (3)
7. Hanger Hill (3)
8. Hanwell Broadway (3)
9. Lady Margaret (3)
10. North Acton (3)
11. North Greenford (3)
12. North Hanwell (3)
13. Northfield (3)
14. Northolt Mandeville (3)
15. Northolt West End (3)
16. Norwood Green (3)
17. Perivale (3)
18. Pitshanger (3)
19. South Acton (3)
20. Southall Broadway (2)
21. Southall Green (3)
22. Southall West (2)
23. Southfield (3)
24. Walpole (3)

=== Enfield ===
Wards from 1 April 1965 (first election 7 May 1964) to 6 May 1982:

1. Angel Road (2)
2. Arnos (2)
3. Bowes (2)
4. Bullsmoor (2)
5. Bush Hill (2)
6. Bush Hill South (2)
7. Cambridge Road (2)
8. Chase (2)
9. Church Street (2)
10. Cockfosters (2)
11. Craig Park (2)
12. Enfield Wash (2)
13. Grange (2)
14. Green Street (2)
15. Highfield (2)
16. Jubilee (2)
17. New Park (2)
18. Oakwood (2)
19. Ordnance (2)
20. Palmers Green (2)
21. Ponders End (2)
22. Pymmes (2)
23. Silver Street (2)
24. Southgate Green (2)
25. St Alphege (2)
26. St Peter's (2)
27. Town (2)
28. West (2)
29. Willow (2)
30. Winchmore Hill (2)

Wards from 6 May 1982 to 2 May 2002:

1. Angel Road (2)
2. Arnos (2)
3. Bowes (2)
4. Bullsmoor (2)
5. Chase (2)
6. Craig Park (2)
7. Enfield Lock (2)
8. Enfield Wash (2)
9. Grange (2)
10. Green Street (2)
11. Grovelands (2)
12. Highfield (2)
13. Hoe Lane (2)
14. Huxley (2)
15. Jubilee (2)
16. Latymer (2)
17. Merryhills (2)
18. Oakwood (2)
19. Palmers Green (2)
20. Ponders End (2)
21. Raglan (2)
22. St Alphege (2)
23. St Marks (2)
24. St Peters (2)
25. Southbury (2)
26. Southgate Green (2)
27. Town (2)
28. Trent (2)
29. Village (2)
30. Weir Hall (2)
31. Willow (2)
32. Winchmore Hill (2)
33. Worcesters (2)

Wards from 2 May 2002 to 5 May 2022:

1. Bowes (3)
2. Bush Hill Park (3)
3. Chase (3)
4. Cockfosters (3)
5. Edmonton Green (3)
6. Enfield Highway (3)
7. Enfield Lock (3)
8. Grange (3)
9. Haselbury (3)
10. Highlands (3)
11. Jubilee (3)
12. Lower Edmonton (3)
13. Palmers Green (3)
14. Ponders End (3)
15. Southbury (3)
16. Southgate (3)
17. Southgate Green (3)
18. Town (3)
19. Turkey Street (3)
20. Upper Edmonton (3)
21. Winchmore Hill (3)

Wards from 5 May 2022:

1. Arnos Grove (2)
2. Bowes (2)
3. Brimsdown (3)
4. Bullsmoor (2)
5. Bush Hill Park (3)
6. Carterhatch (2)
7. Cockfosters (2)
8. Edmonton Green (3)
9. Enfield Lock (3)
10. Grange Park (2)
11. Haselbury (3)
12. Highfield (2)
13. Jubilee (3)
14. Lower Edmonton (3)
15. New Southgate (2)
16. Oakwood (2)
17. Palmers Green (2)
18. Ponders End (2)
19. Ridgeway (3)
20. Southbury (3)
21. Southgate (3)
22. Town (3)
23. Upper Edmonton (3)
24. Whitewebbs (3)
25. Winchmore Hill (2)

=== Greenwich ===
Wards from 1 April 1965 (first election 7 May 1964) to 4 May 1978:

1. Abbey Wood (3)
2. Academy (2)
3. Blackheath (2)
4. Charlton (2)
5. Coldharbour (2)
6. Eastcombe (2)
7. Eltham (2)
8. Eynsham (2)
9. Hornfair (2)
10. Horn Park (2)
11. Kidbrooke (3)
12. Marsh (2)
13. Middle Park (2)
14. New Eltham (3)
15. Park (2)
16. St George's (2)
17. St Margaret's (3)
18. St Mary's (3)
19. St Nicholas (3)
20. Sherard (2)
21. Shooters Hill (2)
22. Slade (2)
23. Trafalgar (2)
24. Vanbrugh (2)
25. Well Hall (2)
26. West (2)
27. Woolwich (2)

Wards from 4 May 1978 to 2 May 2002:

1. Abbey Wood (2)
2. Arsenal (1)
3. Avery Hill (1)
4. Blackheath (2)
5. Burrage (1)
6. Charlton (2)
7. Coldharbour (2)
8. Deansfield (1)
9. Eltham Park (2)
10. Eynsham (2)
11. Ferrier (2)
12. Glyndon (2)
13. Herbert (2)
14. Hornfair (2)
15. Kidbrooke (2)
16. Lakedale (2)
17. Middle Park (2)
18. New Eltham (2)
19. Nightingale (1)
20. Palace (1)
21. Plumstead Common (1)
22. Rectory Field (2)
23. St Alfege (2)
24. St Mary's (2)
25. St Nicholas (2)
26. Sherard (2)
27. Shrewsbury (1)
28. Slade (2)
29. Sutcliffe (1)
30. Tarn (1)
31. Thamesmead Moorings (2)
32. Trafalgar (2)
33. Vanbrugh (2)
34. Well Hall (2)
35. West (2)
36. Woolwich Common (2)

Wards from 2 May 2002 to 5 May 2022:

1. Abbey Wood (3)
2. Blackheath Westcombe (3)
3. Charlton (3)
4. Coldharbour & New Eltham (3)
5. Eltham North (3)
6. Eltham South (3)
7. Eltham West (3)
8. Glyndon (3)
9. Greenwich West (3)
10. Kidbrooke with Hornfair (3)
11. Middle Park & Sutcliffe (3)
12. Peninsula (3)
13. Plumstead (3)
14. Shooters Hill (3)
15. Thamesmead Moorings (3)
16. Woolwich Common (3)
17. Woolwich Riverside (3)

Wards from 5 May 2022:

1. Abbey Wood (3)
2. Blackheath Westcombe (3)
3. Charlton Hornfair (2)
4. Charlton Village & Riverside (2)
5. East Greenwich (3)
6. Eltham Page (2)
7. Eltham Park & Progress (2)
8. Eltham Town & Avery Hill (3)
9. Greenwich Creekside (2)
10. Greenwich Park (2)
11. Greenwich Peninsula (3)
12. Kidbrooke Park (2)
13. Kidbrooke Village & Sutcliffe (2)
14. Middle Park & Horn Park (2)
15. Mottingham, Coldharbour & New Eltham (3)
16. Plumstead & Glyndon (3)
17. Plumstead Common (3)
18. Shooters Hill (2)
19. Thamesmead Moorings (2)
20. West Thamesmead (2)
21. Woolwich Arsenal (3)
22. Woolwich Common (2)
23. Woolwich Dockyard (2)

=== Hackney ===
Wards from 1 April 1965 (first election 7 May 1964) to 4 May 1978:

1. Brownswood (2)
2. Chatham (3)
3. Clissold (3)
4. Dalston (3)
5. De Beauvoir (3)
6. Defoe (4)
7. Downs (5)
8. Haggerston (2)
9. Kingsmead (4)
10. Leabridge (3)
11. Moorfields (2)
12. New River (3)
13. Northfield (3)
14. Northwold (2)
15. Queensbridge (4)
16. Rectory (2)
17. Springfield (3)
18. Victoria (3)
19. Wenlock (3)
20. Wick (3)

Wards from 4 May 1978 to 2 May 2002:

1. Brownswood (2)
2. Chatham (3)
3. Clissold (3)
4. Dalston (3)
5. De Beauvoir (3)
6. Eastdown (3)
7. Haggerston (2)
8. Homerton (2)
9. Kings Park (2)
10. Leabridge (3)
11. Moorfields (2)
12. New River (3)
13. North Defoe (2)
14. Northfield (3)
15. Northwold (3)
16. Queensbridge (3)
17. Rectory (3)
18. South Defoe (3)
19. Springfield (3)
20. Victoria (3)
21. Wenlock (2)
22. Westdown (2)
23. Wick (3)

Wards from 2 May 2002 to 22 May 2014:

1. Brownswood (3)
2. Cazenove (3)
3. Chatham (3)
4. Clissold (3)
5. Dalston (3)
6. De Beauvoir (3)
7. Hackney Central (3)
8. Hackney Downs (3)
9. Haggerston (3)
10. Hoxton (3)
11. King's Park (3)
12. Leabridge (3)
13. Lordship (3)
14. New River (3)
15. Queensbridge (3)
16. Springfield (3)
17. Stoke Newington Central (3)
18. Victoria (3)
19. Wick (3)

Wards from 22 May 2014 to present:

1. Brownswood (2)
2. Cazenove (3)
3. Clissold (3)
4. Dalston (2)
5. De Beauvoir (2)
6. Hackney Central (3)
7. Hackney Downs (3)
8. Hackney Wick (3)
9. Haggerston (3)
10. Homerton (3)
11. Hoxton East & Shoreditch (3)
12. Hoxton West (3)
13. King's Park (3)
14. Lea Bridge (3)
15. London Fields (3)
16. Shacklewell (2)
17. Springfield (3)
18. Stamford Hill West (2)
19. Stoke Newington (3)
20. Victoria (3)
21. Woodberry Down (2)

=== Hammersmith and Fulham ===
Wards from 1 April 1965 (first election 7 May 1964) to 4 May 1978:

1. Addison (3)
2. Avonmore (2)
3. Broadway (3)
4. Brook Green (3)
5. Colehill (2)
6. College Park & Old Oak (3)
7. Coningham (3)
8. Crabtree (3)
9. Gibbs Green (3)
10. Grove (3)
11. Halford (3)
12. Margravine (3)
13. Parsons Green (3)
14. St Stephen's (3)
15. Sandford (3)
16. Sherbrooke (2)
17. Starch Green (3)
18. Sulivan (3)
19. Town (3)
20. White City (3)
21. Wormholt (3)

Wards from 4 May 1978 to 2 May 2002:

1. Addison (2)
2. Avonmore (2)
3. Broadway (2)
4. Brook Green (2)
5. Colehill (2)
6. College Park & Old Oak (3)
7. Coningham (3)
8. Crabtree (2)
9. Eel Brook (2)
10. Gibbs Green (2)
11. Grove (2)
12. Margravine (2)
13. Normand (2)
14. Palace (2)
15. Ravenscourt (2)
16. Sands End (2)
17. Sherbrooke (2)
18. Starch Green (2)
19. Sulivan (2)
20. Town (2)
21. Walham (2)
22. White City & Shepherds Bush (3)
23. Wormholt (3)

Wards from 2 May 2002 to 5 May 2022:

1. Addison (3)
2. Askew (3)
3. Avonmore & Brook Green (3)
4. College Park & Old Oak (2)
5. Fulham Broadway (3)
6. Fulham Reach (3)
7. Hammersmith Broadway (3)
8. Munster (3)
9. North End (3)
10. Palace Riverside (2)
11. Parsons Green & Walham (3)
12. Ravenscourt Park (3)
13. Sands End (3)
14. Shepherd's Bush Green (3)
15. Town (3)
16. Wormholt & White City (3)

Wards from 5 May 2022:

1. Addison (2)
2. Avonmore (2)
3. Brook Green (2)
4. College Park & Old Oak (3)
5. Coningham (3)
6. Fulham Reach (3)
7. Fulham Town (2)
8. Grove (2)
9. Hammersmith Broadway (2)
10. Lillie (2)
11. Munster (3)
12. Palace and Hurlingham (3)
13. Parsons Green & Sandford (2)
14. Ravenscourt (2)
15. Sands End (3)
16. Shepherd's Bush Green (2)
17. Walham Green (2)
18. Wendell Park (2)
19. West Kensington (3)
20. White City (3)
21. Wormholt (2)

=== Haringey ===
Wards from 1 April 1965 (first election 7 May 1964) to 4 May 1978:

1. Alexandra-Bowes (4)
2. Bruce Grove (3)
3. Central Hornsey (3)
4. Coleraine (4)
5. Crouch End (3)
6. Fortis Green (3)
7. Green Lanes (3)
8. High Cross (2)
9. Highgate (3)
10. Muswell Hill (3)
11. Noel Park (4)
12. Park (3)
13. Seven Sisters (3)
14. South Hornsey (3)
15. South Tottenham (2)
16. Stroud Green (3)
17. Tottenham Central (3)
18. Town Hall (3)
19. Turnpike (2)
20. West Green (3)

Wards from 4 May 1978 to 2 May 2002:

1. Alexandra (3)
2. Archway (2)
3. Bowes Park (3)
4. Bruce Grove (3)
5. Coleraine (3)
6. Crouch End (3)
7. Fortis Green (3)
8. Green Lanes (2)
9. Harringay (3)
10. High Cross (2)
11. Highgate (2)
12. Hornsey Central (2)
13. Hornsey Vale (2)
14. Muswell Hill (3)
15. Noel Park (3)
16. Park (2)
17. Seven Sisters (2)
18. South Hornsey (2)
19. South Tottenham (2)
20. Tottenham Central (3)
21. West Green (3)
22. White Hart Lane (3)
23. Woodside (3)

Wards from 2 May 2002 to 5 May 2022:

1. Alexandra (3)
2. Bounds Green (3)
3. Bruce Grove (3)
4. Crouch End (3)
5. Fortis Green (3)
6. Harringay (3)
7. Highgate (3)
8. Hornsey (3)
9. Muswell Hill (3)
10. Noel Park (3)
11. Northumberland Park (3)
12. Seven Sisters (3)
13. St Ann's (3)
14. Stroud Green (3)
15. Tottenham Green (3)
16. Tottenham Hale (3)
17. West Green (3)
18. White Hart Lane (3)
19. Woodside (3)

Wards from 5 May 2022:

1. Alexandra Park (2)
2. Bounds Green (2)
3. Bruce Castle (3)
4. Crouch End (3)
5. Fortis Green (3)
6. Harringay (3)
7. Hermitage & Gardens (2)
8. Highgate (3)
9. Hornsey (3)
10. Muswell Hill (2)
11. Noel Park (3)
12. Northumberland Park (3)
13. Seven Sisters (2)
14. South Tottenham (3)
15. St Ann's (2)
16. Stroud Green (3)
17. Tottenham Central (3)
18. Tottenham Hale (3)
19. West Green (3)
20. White Hart Lane (3)
21. Woodside (3)

=== Harrow ===
Wards from 1 April 1965 (first election 7 May 1964) to 4 May 1978:

1. Belmont (3)
2. Harrow Weald (4)
3. Harrow-on-the-Hill & Greenhill (3)
4. Headstone (3)
5. Kenton (4)
6. Pinner North & Hatch End (5)
7. Pinner South (5)
8. Queensbury (3)
9. Roxbourne (3)
10. Roxeth (4)
11. Stanmore North (5)
12. Stanmore South (3)
13. Wealdstone North (4)
14. Wealdstone South (3)
15. West Harrow (4)

Wards from 4 May 1978 to 2 May 2002:

1. Canons (3)
2. Centenary (3)
3. Greenhill (3)
4. Harrow on the Hill (3)
5. Harrow Weald (3)
6. Hatch End (3)
7. Headstone North (3)
8. Headstone South (3)
9. Kenton East (3)
10. Kenton West (3)
11. Marlborough (3)
12. Pinner (3)
13. Pinner West (3)
14. Rayners Lane (3)
15. Ridgeway (3)
16. Roxbourne (3)
17. Roxeth (3)
18. Stanmore Park (3)
19. Stanmore South (3)
20. Wealdstone (3)
21. Wemborough (3)

Wards from 2 May 2002 to 5 May 2022:

1. Belmont (3)
2. Canons (3)
3. Edgware (3)
4. Greenhill (3)
5. Harrow on the Hill (3)
6. Harrow Weald (3)
7. Hatch End (3)
8. Headstone North (3)
9. Headstone South (3)
10. Kenton East (3)
11. Kenton West (3)
12. Marlborough (3)
13. Pinner (3)
14. Pinner South (3)
15. Queensbury (3)
16. Rayners Lane (3)
17. Roxbourne (3)
18. Roxeth (3)
19. Stanmore Park (3)
20. Wealdstone (3)
21. West Harrow (3)

Wards from 5 May 2022:

1. Belmont (2)
2. Canons (2)
3. Centenary (3)
4. Edgware (3)
5. Greenhill (3)
6. Harrow on the Hill (2)
7. Harrow Weald (3)
8. Hatch End (2)
9. Headstone (3)
10. Kenton East (3)
11. Kenton West (2)
12. Marlborough (3)
13. North Harrow (2)
14. Pinner (3)
15. Pinner South (3)
16. Rayners Lane (2)
17. Roxbourne (2)
18. Roxeth (3)
19. Stanmore (3)
20. Wealdstone North (2)
21. Wealdstone South (2)
22. West Harrow (2)

=== Havering ===
Wards from 1 April 1965 (first election 7 May 1964) to 4 May 1978:

1. Bedfords (2)
2. Central (3)
3. Collier Row (3)
4. Cranham (3)
5. Elm Park (3)
6. Emerson Park (3)
7. Gidea Park (2)
8. Gooshays (3)
9. Hacton (3)
10. Harold Wood (3)
11. Heath Park (3)
12. Heaton (2)
13. Hilldene (2)
14. Hylands (3)
15. Mawney (3)
16. Oldchurch (2)
17. Rainham (3)
18. St Andrew's (3)
19. South Hornchurch (3)
20. Upminster (3)

Wards from 4 May 1978 to 2 May 2002:

1. Airfield (3)
2. Ardleigh Green (2)
3. Brooklands (2)
4. Chase Cross (2)
5. Collier Row (2)
6. Cranham East (2)
7. Cranham West (2)
8. Elm Park (3)
9. Emerson Park (2)
10. Gidea Park (2)
11. Gooshays (3)
12. Hacton (3)
13. Harold Wood (3)
14. Heath Park (2)
15. Heaton (3)
16. Hilldene (3)
17. Hylands (3)
18. Mawney (3)
19. Oldchurch (2)
20. Rainham (3)
21. Rise Park (2)
22. St Andrew's (3)
23. St Edward's (2)
24. South Hornchurch (3)
25. Upminster (3)

Wards from 2 May 2002 to 5 May 2022:

1. Brooklands (3)
2. Cranham (3)
3. Elm Park (3)
4. Emerson Park (3)
5. Gooshays (3)
6. Hacton (3)
7. Harold Wood (3)
8. Havering Park (3)
9. Heaton (3)
10. Hylands (3)
11. Mawneys (3)
12. Pettits (3)
13. Rainham & Wennington (3)
14. Romford Town (3)
15. St Andrew's (3)
16. South Hornchurch (3)
17. Squirrel's Heath (3)
18. Upminster (3)

Wards from 5 May 2022:

1. Beam Park (2)
2. Cranham (3)
3. Elm Park (3)
4. Emerson Park (2)
5. Gooshays (3)
6. Hacton (2)
7. Harold Wood (3)
8. Havering-atte-Bower (3)
9. Heaton (3)
10. Hylands & Harrow Lodge (3)
11. Marshalls & Rise Park (3)
12. Mawneys (3)
13. Rainham & Wennington (3)
14. Rush Green & Crowlands (3)
15. South Hornchurch (2)
16. Squirrels Heath (3)
17. St Alban's (2)
18. St Andrew's (3)
19. St Edward's (3)
20. Upminster (3)

=== Hillingdon ===
Wards from 1 April 1965 (first election 7 May 1964) to 4 May 1978:

1. Belmore (4)
2. Colham-Cowley (3)
3. Eastcote (3)
4. Frogmore (4)
5. Harefield (2)
6. Haydon (3)
7. Hayes (4)
8. Hillingdon East (3)
9. Hillingdon West (3)
10. Ickenham (3)
11. Manor (3)
12. Northwood (3)
13. Ruislip (3)
14. South (4)
15. South Ruislip (4)
16. Uxbridge (3)
17. Yeading (4)
18. Yiewsley (4)

Wards from 4 May 1978 to 2 May 2002:

1. Barnhill (3)
2. Botwell (2)
3. Bourne (2)
4. Cavendish (2)
5. Charville (3)
6. Colham (2)
7. Cowley (3)
8. Crane (2)
9. Deansfield (2)
10. Eastcote (3)
11. Harefield (2)
12. Harlington (3)
13. Heathrow (2)
14. Hillingdon East (2)
15. Hillingdon North (2)
16. Hillingdon West (3)
17. Ickenham (3)
18. Manor (2)
19. Northwood (3)
20. Northwood Hills (3)
21. Ruislip (2)
22. St Martins (2)
23. Townfield (3)
24. Uxbridge North (2)
25. Uxbridge South (2)
26. West Drayton (2)
27. Wood End (2)
28. Yeading (3)
29. Yiewsley (2)

Wards from 2 May 2002 to 5 May 2022:

1. Barnhill (3)
2. Botwell (3)
3. Brunel (3)
4. Cavendish (3)
5. Charville (3)
6. Eastcote & East Ruislip (3)
7. Harefield (2)
8. Heathrow Villages (3)
9. Hillingdon East (3)
10. Ickenham (3)
11. Manor (3)
12. Northwood (3)
13. Northwood Hills (3)
14. Pinkwell (3)
15. South Ruislip (3)
16. Townfield (3)
17. Uxbridge North (3)
18. Uxbridge South (3)
19. West Drayton (3)
20. West Ruislip (3)
21. Yeading (3)
22. Yiewsley (3)

Wards from 5 May 2022:

1. Belmore (3)
2. Charville (2)
3. Colham & Cowley (3)
4. Eastcote (3)
5. Harefield Village (1)
6. Hayes Town (3)
7. Heathrow Villages (2)
8. Hillingdon East (3)
9. Hillingdon West (2)
10. Ickenham & South Harefield (3)
11. Northwood (2)
12. Northwood Hills (2)
13. Pinkwell (3)
14. Ruislip (3)
15. Ruislip Manor (2)
16. South Ruislip (3)
17. Uxbridge (3)
18. West Drayton (3)
19. Wood End (3)
20. Yeading (2)
21. Yiewsley (2)

=== Hounslow ===
Wards from 1 April 1965 (first election 7 May 1964) to 4 May 1978:

1. Clifden (3)
2. Cranford (3)
3. East Bedfont (3)
4. Feltham Central (3)
5. Feltham North (3)
6. Feltham South (3)
7. Gunnersbury (3)
8. Hanworth (3)
9. Heston East (3)
10. Heston West (3)
11. Homefields (3)
12. Hounslow Central (3)
13. Hounslow Heath (3)
14. Hounslow South (3)
15. Hounslow West (3)
16. Isleworth North (3)
17. Isleworth South (3)
18. Riverside (3)
19. Spring Grove (3)
20. Turnham Green (3)

Wards from 4 May 1978 to 2 May 2002:

1. Brentford Clifden (3)
2. Chiswick Homefields (2)
3. Chiswick Riverside (3)
4. Cranford (3)
5. East Bedfont (3)
6. Feltham Central (3)
7. Feltham North (3)
8. Feltham South (3)
9. Gunnersbury (3)
10. Hanworth (3)
11. Heston Central (2)
12. Heston East (2)
13. Heston West (3)
14. Hounslow Central (3)
15. Hounslow Heath (3)
16. Hounslow South (3)
17. Hounslow West (3)
18. Isleworth North (3)
19. Isleworth South (3)
20. Spring Grove (3)
21. Turnham Green (3)

Wards from 2 May 2002 to 5 May 2022:

1. Bedfont (3)
2. Brentford (3)
3. Chiswick Homefields (3)
4. Chiswick Riverside (3)
5. Cranford (3)
6. Feltham North (3)
7. Feltham West (3)
8. Hanworth (3)
9. Hanworth Park (3)
10. Heston Central (3)
11. Heston East (3)
12. Heston West (3)
13. Hounslow Central (3)
14. Hounslow Heath (3)
15. Hounslow South (3)
16. Hounslow West (3)
17. Isleworth (3)
18. Osterley & Spring Grove (3)
19. Syon (3)
20. Turnham Green (3)

Wards from 5 May 2022:

1. Bedfont (3)
2. Brentford East (2)
3. Brentford West (2)
4. Chiswick Gunnersbury (3)
5. Chiswick Homefields (3)
6. Chiswick Riverside (3)
7. Cranford (3)
8. Feltham North (3)
9. Feltham West (3)
10. Hanworth Park (2)
11. Hanworth Village (3)
12. Heston Central (3)
13. Heston East (3)
14. Heston West (3)
15. Hounslow Central (3)
16. Hounslow East (2)
17. Hounslow Heath (3)
18. Hounslow South (3)
19. Hounslow West (3)
20. Isleworth (3)
21. Osterley & Spring Grove (3)
22. Syon & Brentford Lock (3)

=== Islington ===
Wards from 1 April 1965 (first election 7 May 1964) to 4 May 1978:

1. Barnsbury (3)
2. Bunhill (2)
3. Canonbury (4)
4. Clerkenwell (3)
5. Highbury (4)
6. Highview (3)
7. Hillmarton (2)
8. Hillrise (3)
9. Holloway (4)
10. Junction (4)
11. Mildmay (4)
12. Parkway (3)
13. Pentonville (3)
14. Quadrant (4)
15. St George's (3)
16. St Mary (3)
17. St Peter (3)
18. Station (2)
19. Thornhill (3)

Wards from 4 May 1978 to 2 May 2002:

1. Barnsbury (3)
2. Bunhill (3)
3. Canonbury East (2)
4. Canonbury West (2)
5. Clerkenwell (3)
6. Gillespie (2)
7. Highbury (3)
8. Highview (2)
9. Hillmarton (2)
10. Hillrise (3)
11. Holloway (3)
12. Junction (3)
13. Mildmay (3)
14. Quadrant (2)
15. St George's (3)
16. St Mary (3)
17. St Peter (3)
18. Sussex (2)
19. Thornhill (2)
20. Tollington (3)

Wards from 2 May 2002 to 5 May 2022:

1. Barnsbury (3)
2. Bunhill (3)
3. Caledonian (3)
4. Canonbury (3)
5. Clerkenwell (3)
6. Finsbury Park (3)
7. Highbury East (3)
8. Highbury West (3)
9. Hillrise (3)
10. Holloway (3)
11. Junction (3)
12. Mildmay (3)
13. St George's (3)
14. St Mary's (3)
15. St Peter's (3)
16. Tollington (3)

Wards from 5 May 2022:

1. Arsenal (3)
2. Barnsbury (3)
3. Bunhill (3)
4. Caledonian (3)
5. Canonbury (3)
6. Clerkenwell (3)
7. Finsbury Park (3)
8. Highbury (3)
9. Hillrise (3)
10. Holloway (3)
11. Junction (3)
12. Laycock (3)
13. Mildmay (3)
14. St Mary's & St James' (3)
15. St Peter's & Canalside (3)
16. Tollington (3)
17. Tufnell Park (3)

=== Kensington and Chelsea ===
Wards from 1 April 1965 (first election 7 May 1964) to 2 May 1974:

1. Brompton (4)
2. Cheyne (2)
3. Church (3)
4. Earls Court (6)
5. Golborne (3)
6. Hans Town (3)
7. Holland (6)
8. Norland (4)
9. North Stanley (2)
10. Pembridge (6)
11. Queen's Gate (4)
12. Redcliffe (7)
13. Royal Hospital (2)
14. St Charles (6)
15. South Stanley (2)

Wards from 2 May 1974 to 2 May 2002:

1. Abingdon (3)
2. Avondale (3)
3. Brompton (2)
4. Campden (3)
5. Cheyne (2)
6. Church (2)
7. Colville (3)
8. Courtfield (3)
9. Earls Court (3)
10. Golborne (3)
11. Hans Town (3)
12. Holland (3)
13. Kelfield (2)
14. Norland (2)
15. North Stanley (2)
16. Pembridge (3)
17. Queen's Gate (3)
18. Redcliffe (3)
19. Royal Hospital (2)
20. St Charles (2)
21. South Stanley (2)

Wards from 2 May 2002 to 22 May 2014:

1. Abingdon (3)
2. Brompton (3)
3. Campden (3)
4. Colville (3)
5. Courtfield (3)
6. Cremorne (3)
7. Earl's Court (3)
8. Golborne (3)
9. Hans Town (3)
10. Holland (3)
11. Norland (3)
12. Notting Barns (3)
13. Pembridge (3)
14. Queen's Gate (3)
15. Redcliffe (3)
16. Royal Hospital (3)
17. St Charles (3)
18. Stanley (3)

Wards from 22 May 2014 to present:

1. Abingdon (3)
2. Brompton & Hans Town (3)
3. Campden (3)
4. Chelsea Riverside (3)
5. Colville (3)
6. Courtfield (3)
7. Dalgarno (2)
8. Earl's Court (3)
9. Golborne (3)
10. Holland (3)
11. Norland (2)
12. Notting Dale (3)
13. Pembridge (2)
14. Queen's Gate (3)
15. Redcliffe (3)
16. Royal Hospital (3)
17. St Helen's (2)
18. Stanley (3)

=== Kingston upon Thames ===
Wards from 1 April 1965 (first election 7 May 1964) to 4 May 1978:

1. Berrylands (4)
2. Burlington (2)
3. Cambridge (2)
4. Canbury (3)
5. Chessington (4)
6. Coombe (2)
7. Dickerage (2)
8. Grove (3)
9. Hill (2)
10. Hook & Southborough (4)
11. Malden Green (2)
12. Malden Manor (2)
13. Mount (2)
14. Norbiton (2)
15. Norbiton Park (2)
16. Park (2)
17. St James's (2)
18. St Mark's & Seething Wells (4)
19. Surbiton Hill (3)
20. Tolworth East (3)
21. Tolworth South (2)
22. Tolworth West (2)
23. Town (2)
24. Tudor (2)

Wards from 4 May 1978 to 2 May 2002:

1. Berrylands (3)
2. Burlington (2)
3. Cambridge (3)
4. Canbury (3)
5. Chessington North (2)
6. Chessington South (3)
7. Coombe (2)
8. Grove (3)
9. Hill (2)
10. Hook (2)
11. Malden Manor (2)
12. Norbiton (3)
13. Norbiton Park (2)
14. St James (3)
15. St Marks (3)
16. Surbiton Hill (3)
17. Tolworth East (2)
18. Tolworth South (2)
19. Tolworth West (2)
20. Tudor (3)

Wards from 2 May 2002 to 5 May 2022:

1. Alexandra (3)
2. Berrylands (3)
3. Beverley (3)
4. Canbury (3)
5. Chessington North & Hook (3)
6. Chessington South (3)
7. Coombe Hill (3)
8. Coombe Vale (3)
9. Grove (3)
10. Norbiton (3)
11. Old Malden (3)
12. St James (3)
13. St Mark's (3)
14. Surbiton Hill (3)
15. Tolworth & Hook Rise (3)
16. Tudor (3)

Wards from 5 May 2022 to present:

1. Alexandra (2)
2. Berrylands (2)
3. Canbury Gardens (2)
4. Chessington South & Malden Rushett (3)
5. Coombe Hill (2)
6. Coombe Vale (3)
7. Green Lane & St James (2)
8. Hook & Chessington North (3)
9. King George's & Sunray (2)
10. Kingston Gate (3)
11. Kingston Town (3)
12. Motspur Park & Old Malden East (2)
13. New Malden Village (3)
14. Norbiton (3)
15. Old Malden (2)
16. St Mark's & Seething Wells (3)
17. Surbiton Hill (3)
18. Tolworth (3)
19. Tudor (2)

=== Lambeth ===
Wards from 1 April 1965 (first election 7 May 1964) to 4 May 1978:

1. Angell (3)
2. Bishop's (3)
3. Clapham Park (3)
4. Clapham Town (3)
5. Ferndale (3)
6. Herne Hill (3)
7. Knight's Hill (3)
8. Larkhall (3)
9. Leigham (3)
10. Oval (3)
11. Prince's (3)
12. St Leonard's (3)
13. Stockwell (3)
14. Streatham South (3)
15. Streatham Wells (3)
16. Thornton (3)
17. Thurlow Park (3)
18. Town Hall (3)
19. Tulse Hill (3)
20. Vassall (3)

Wards from 4 May 1978 to 2 May 2002:

1. Angell (3)
2. Bishop's (3)
3. Clapham Park (3)
4. Clapham Town (3)
5. Ferndale (3)
6. Gipsy Hill (3)
7. Herne Hill (3)
8. Knight's Hill (3)
9. Larkhall (3)
10. Oval (3)
11. Prince's (3)
12. St Leonard's (3)
13. St Martin's (3)
14. Stockwell (3)
15. Streatham Hill (3)
16. Streatham South (3)
17. Streatham Wells (3)
18. Thornton (2)
19. Thurlow Park (2)
20. Town Hall (3)
21. Tulse Hill (3)
22. Vassall (3)

Wards from 2 May 2002 to 5 May 2022:

1. Bishop's (3)
2. Brixton Hill (3)
3. Clapham Common (3)
4. Clapham Town (3)
5. Coldharbour (3)
6. Ferndale (3)
7. Gipsy Hill (3)
8. Herne Hill (3)
9. Knight's Hill (3)
10. Larkhall (3)
11. Oval (3)
12. Prince's (3)
13. St Leonard's (3)
14. Stockwell (3)
15. Streatham Hill (3)
16. Streatham South (3)
17. Streatham Wells (3)
18. Thornton (3)
19. Thurlow Park (3)
20. Tulse Hill (3)
21. Vassall (3)

Wards from 5 May 2022:

1. Brixton Acre Lane (3)
2. Brixton North (3)
3. Brixton Rush Common (3)
4. Brixton Windrush (2)
5. Clapham Common & Abbeville (2)
6. Clapham East (2)
7. Clapham Park (3)
8. Clapham Town (3)
9. Gipsy Hill (2)
10. Herne Hill & Loughborough Junction (3)
11. Kennington (3)
12. Knight's Hill (3)
13. Myatt's Fields (2)
14. Oval (3)
15. St Martin's (2)
16. Stockwell East (2)
17. Stockwell West & Larkhall (3)
18. Streatham Common & Vale (3)
19. Streatham Hill East (2)
20. Streatham Hill West & Thornton (2)
21. Streatham St Leonard's (3)
22. Streatham Wells (2)
23. Vauxhall (3)
24. Waterloo & South Bank (2)
25. West Dulwich (2)

=== Lewisham ===
Wards from 1 April 1965 (first election 7 May 1964) to 4 May 1978:

1. Bellingham (2)
2. Blackheath & Lewisham Village (3)
3. Brockley (3); renamed Crofton Park in 1973
4. Culverley (2)
5. Deptford (3)
6. Drake (3)
7. Forest Hill (3)
8. Grinling Gibbons (3)
9. Grove Park (2)
10. Honor Oak Park (3)
11. Ladywell (3)
12. Lewisham Park (3)
13. Manor Lee (2)
14. Marlowe (3)
15. Pepys (3)
16. Rushey Green (2)
17. St Andrew (2)
18. St Mildred Lee (2)
19. South Lee (2)
20. Southend (3)
21. Sydenham East (3)
22. Sydenham West (3)
23. Whitefoot (2)

Wards from 4 May 1978 to 2 May 2002:

1. Bellingham (2)
2. Blackheath (2)
3. Blythe Hill (2)
4. Catford (2)
5. Churchdown (3)
6. Crofton Park (3)
7. Downham (3)
8. Drake (3)
9. Evelyn (3)
10. Forest Hill (2)
11. Grinling Gibbons (3)
12. Grove Park (2)
13. Hither Green (3)
14. Horniman (3)
15. Ladywell (3)
16. Manor Lee (2)
17. Marlowe (3)
18. Pepys (3)
19. Perry Hill (3)
20. Rushey Green (2)
21. St Andrew (2)
22. St Margaret (2)
23. St Mildred (3)
24. Sydenham East (3)
25. Sydenham West (3)
26. Whitefoot (2)

Wards from 2 May 2002 to 5 May 2022:

1. Bellingham (3)
2. Blackheath (3)
3. Brockley (3)
4. Catford South (3)
5. Crofton Park (3)
6. Downham (3)
7. Evelyn (3)
8. Forest Hill (3)
9. Grove Park (3)
10. Ladywell (3)
11. Lee Green (3)
12. Lewisham Central (3)
13. New Cross (3)
14. Perry Vale (3)
15. Rushey Green (3)
16. Sydenham (3)
17. Telegraph Hill (3)
18. Whitefoot (3)

Wards from 5 May 2022:

1. Bellingham (2)
2. Blackheath (3)
3. Brockley (3)
4. Catford South (3)
5. Crofton Park (3)
6. Deptford (3)
7. Downham (3)
8. Evelyn (3)
9. Forest Hill (3)
10. Grove Park (3)
11. Hither Green (3)
12. Ladywell (3)
13. Lee Green (3)
14. Lewisham Central (2)
15. New Cross Gate (2)
16. Perry Vale (3)
17. Rushey Green (3)
18. Sydenham (3)
19. Telegraph Hill (3)

=== Merton ===
Wards from 1 April 1965 (first election 7 May 1964) to 4 May 1978:

1. Cannon Hill (4)
2. Mitcham Central (4)
3. Mitcham East (2)
4. Mitcham North (4)
5. Mitcham South (4)
6. Mitcham West (4)
7. Morden (4)
8. Priory (4)
9. Ravensbury (4)
10. West Barnes (4)
11. Wimbledon East (4)
12. Wimbledon North (4)
13. Wimbledon South (4)
14. Wimbledon West (4)

Wards from 4 May 1978 to 2 May 2002:

1. Abbey (3)
2. Cannon Hill (3)
3. Colliers Wood (3)
4. Dundonald (3)
5. Durnsford (2)
6. Figge's Marsh (3)
7. Graveney (2)
8. Hillside (3)
9. Lavender (2)
10. Longthornton (3)
11. Lower Morden (3)
12. Merton Park (3)
13. Phipps Bridge (3)
14. Pollards Hill (3)
15. Ravensbury (3)
16. Raynes Park (3)
17. St Helier (3)
18. Trinity (3)
19. Village (3)
20. West Barnes (3)

Wards from 2 May 2002 to 5 May 2022:

1. Abbey (3)
2. Cannon Hill (3)
3. Colliers Wood (3)
4. Cricket Green (3)
5. Dundonald (3)
6. Figge's Marsh (3)
7. Graveney (3)
8. Hillside (3)
9. Lavender Fields (3)
10. Longthornton (3)
11. Lower Morden (3)
12. Merton Park (3)
13. Pollards Hill (3)
14. Ravensbury (3)
15. Raynes Park (3)
16. St Helier (3)
17. Trinity (3)
18. Village (3)
19. West Barnes (3)
20. Wimbledon Park (3)

Wards from 5 May 2022:

1. Abbey (3)
2. Cannon Hill (3)
3. Colliers Wood (3)
4. Cricket Green (3)
5. Figge's Marsh (3)
6. Graveney (3)
7. Hillside (2)
8. Lavender Fields (3)
9. Longthornton (3)
10. Lower Morden (3)
11. Merton Park (2)
12. Pollards Hill (3)
13. Ravensbury (3)
14. Raynes Park (3)
15. St Helier (3)
16. Village (3)
17. Wandle (2)
18. West Barnes (3)
19. Wimbledon Park (3)
20. Wimbledon Town & Dundonald (3)

=== Newham ===
Wards from 1 April 1965 (first election 7 May 1964) to 4 May 1978:

1. Beckton (2)
2. Bemersyde (2)
3. Canning Town & Grange (2)
4. Castle (2)
5. Central (2)
6. Custom House & Silvertown (3)
7. Forest Gate (3)
8. Greatfield (3)
9. Hudsons (3)
10. Kensington (2)
11. Little Ilford (3)
12. Manor Park (3)
13. New Town (2)
14. Ordnance (2)
15. Park (3)
16. Plaistow (3)
17. Plashet (3)
18. St Stephens (2)
19. South (3)
20. Stratford (2)
21. Upton (3)
22. Wall End (3)
23. West Ham (2)
24. Woodgrange (2)

Wards from 4 May 1978 to 2 May 2002:

1. Beckton (2)
2. Bemersyde (2)
3. Canning Town & Grange (2)
4. Castle (2)
5. Central (2)
6. Custom House & Silvertown (3)
7. Forest Gate (3)
8. Greatfield (3)
9. Hudsons (3)
10. Kensington (2)
11. Little Ilford (3)
12. Manor Park (3)
13. Monega (2)
14. New Town (2)
15. Ordnance (2)
16. Park (3)
17. Plaistow (3)
18. Plashet (3)
19. St Stephens (2)
20. South (3)
21. Stratford (2)
22. Upton (3)
23. Wall End (3)
24. West Ham (2)

Wards from 2 May 2002 to 5 May 2022:

1. Beckton (3)
2. Boleyn (3)
3. Canning Town North (3)
4. Canning Town South (3)
5. Custom House (3)
6. East Ham Central (3)
7. East Ham North (3)
8. East Ham South (3)
9. Forest Gate North (3)
10. Forest Gate South (3)
11. Green Street East (3)
12. Green Street West (3)
13. Little Ilford (3)
14. Manor Park (3)
15. Plaistow North (3)
16. Plaistow South (3)
17. Royal Docks (3)
18. Stratford & New Town (3)
19. Wall End (3)
20. West Ham (3)

Wards from 5 May 2022:

1. Beckton (3)
2. Boleyn (3)
3. Canning Town North (3)
4. Canning Town South (3)
5. Custom House (3)
6. East Ham (3)
7. East Ham South (3)
8. Forest Gate North (2)
9. Forest Gate South (3)
10. Green Street East (3)
11. Green Street West (3)
12. Little Ilford (3)
13. Manor Park (3)
14. Maryland (2)
15. Plaistow North (3)
16. Plaistow South (3)
17. Plaistow West & Canning Town East (3)
18. Plashet (2)
19. Royal Albert (2)
20. Royal Victoria (2)
21. Stratford (3)
22. Stratford Olympic Park (2)
23. Wall End (3)
24. West Ham (3)

=== Redbridge ===
Wards from 1 April 1965 (first election 7 May 1964) to 4 May 1978:

1. Aldborough (3)
2. Barkingside (4)
3. Bridge (4)
4. Chadwell (4)
5. Clayhall (3)
6. Clementswood (3)
7. Cranbrook (4)
8. Fairlop (3)
9. Goodmayes (3)
10. Hainault (3)
11. Ilford (3)
12. Mayfield (4)
13. Park (3)
14. Seven Kings (4)
15. Snaresbrook (4)
16. Wanstead (4)
17. Woodford (4)

Wards from 4 May 1978 to 2 May 2002:

1. Aldborough (3)
2. Barkingside (3)
3. Bridge (3)
4. Chadwell (3)
5. Church End (3)
6. Clayhall (3)
7. Clementswood (3)
8. Cranbrook (3)
9. Fairlop (3)
10. Fullwell (3)
11. Goodmayes (3); changed to (2) in 1994
12. Hainault (3)
13. Loxford (3)
14. Mayfield (3)
15. Monkhams (3)
16. Newbury (3)
17. Roding (3)
18. Seven Kings (3)
19. Snaresbrook (3)
20. Valentines (3)
21. Wanstead (3)

Wards from 2 May 2002 to 3 May 2018:

1. Aldborough (3)
2. Barkingside (3)
3. Bridge (3)
4. Chadwell (3)
5. Church End (3)
6. Clayhall (3)
7. Clementswood (3)
8. Cranbrook (3)
9. Fairlop (3)
10. Fullwell (3)
11. Goodmayes (3)
12. Hainault (3)
13. Loxford (3)
14. Mayfield (3)
15. Monkhams (3)
16. Newbury (3)
17. Roding (3)
18. Seven Kings (3)
19. Snaresbrook (3)
20. Valentines (3)
21. Wanstead (3)

Wards from 3 May 2018 to present:

1. Aldborough (3)
2. Barkingside (3)
3. Bridge (3)
4. Chadwell (3)
5. Churchfields (3)
6. Clayhall (3)
7. Clementswood (3)
8. Cranbrook (3)
9. Fairlop (3)
10. Fullwell (3)
11. Goodmayes (3)
12. Hainault (3)
13. Ilford Town (2)
14. Loxford (3)
15. Mayfield (3)
16. Monkhams (2)
17. Newbury (3)
18. Seven Kings (3)
19. South Woodford (3)
20. Valentines (3)
21. Wanstead Park (2)
22. Wanstead Village (3)

=== Richmond upon Thames ===
Wards from 1 April 1965 (first election 7 May 1964) to 9 May 1968:

1. Barnes (4)
2. Bushey Park (3)
3. Central Twickenham (3)
4. East Sheen (4)
5. East Twickenham (3)
6. Ham (1)
7. Hampton (3)
8. Hampton Hill (3)
9. Heathfield (3)
10. Hill (1)
11. Kew (1)
12. King's (1)
13. Manor (1)
14. Mortlake (4)
15. North Sheen (1)
16. Park (1)
17. Petersham (1)
18. Richmond Central (1)
19. Richmond Green (1)
20. St Luke's (1)
21. Selwyn (1)
22. South Twickenham (3)
23. Teddington (3)
24. West Twickenham (3)
25. Whitton (3)

Wards from 9 May 1968 to 4 May 1978:

1. Barnes (3)
2. Central Twickenham (3)
3. East Sheen (3)
4. East Twickenham (3)
5. Ham-Petersham (3)
6. Hampton (3)
7. Hampton Hill (3)
8. Hampton Wick (3)
9. Heathfield (3)
10. Kew (3)
11. Mortlake (3)
12. Palewell (3)
13. Richmond Hill (3)
14. Richmond Town (3)
15. South Twickenham (3)
16. Teddington (3)
17. West Twickenham (3)
18. Whitton (3)

Wards from 4 May 1978 to 2 May 2002:

1. Barnes (3)
2. Central Twickenham (2)
3. East Sheen (2)
4. East Twickenham (3)
5. Ham & Petersham (3)
6. Hampton (3)
7. Hampton Hill (3)
8. Hampton Nursery (2)
9. Hampton Wick (3)
10. Heathfield (3)
11. Kew (3)
12. Mortlake (3)
13. Palewell (3)
14. Richmond Hill (3)
15. Richmond Town (2)
16. South Twickenham (3)
17. Teddington (3)
18. West Twickenham (2)
19. Whitton (3)

Wards from 2 May 2002 to 5 May 2022:

1. Barnes (3)
2. East Sheen (3)
3. Fulwell & Hampton Hill (3)
4. Ham, Petersham & Richmond Riverside (3)
5. Hampton (3)
6. Hampton North (3)
7. Hampton Wick (3)
8. Heathfield (3)
9. Kew (3)
10. Mortlake & Barnes Common (3)
11. North Richmond (3)
12. St Margarets & North Twickenham (3)
13. South Richmond (3)
14. South Twickenham (3)
15. Teddington (3)
16. Twickenham Riverside (3)
17. West Twickenham (3)
18. Whitton (3)

Wards from 5 May 2022:

1. Barnes (3)
2. East Sheen (3)
3. Fulwell & Hampton Hill (3)
4. Ham, Petersham & Richmond Riverside (3)
5. Hampton (3)
6. Hampton North (3)
7. Hampton Wick & South Teddington (3)
8. Heathfield (3)
9. Kew (3)
10. Mortlake & Barnes Common (3)
11. North Richmond (3)
12. South Richmond (3)
13. South Twickenham (3)
14. St Margarets & North Twickenham (3)
15. Teddington (3)
16. Twickenham Riverside (3)
17. West Twickenham (3)
18. Whitton (3)

=== Southwark ===
Wards from 1 April 1965 (first election 7 May 1964) to 9 May 1968:

1. Abbey (3)
2. Alleyn (2)
3. Bellenden (3)
4. Bricklayers (3)
5. Browning (3)
6. Brunswick (3)
7. Burgess (3)
8. Cathedral (3)
9. Chaucer (3)
10. Consort (3)
11. Dockyard (2)
12. Faraday (3)
13. Friary (4)
14. Lyndhurst (3)
15. Newington (3)
16. Riverside (2)
17. Rotherhithe (3)
18. Ruskin (2)
19. Rye (2)
20. St Giles (3)
21. The College (2)
22. Waverley (2)

Wards from 9 May 1968 to 4 May 1978:

1. Abbey (2)
2. Alleyn (2)
3. Bellenden (3)
4. Bricklayers (2)
5. Browning (3)
6. Brunswick (3)
7. Burgess (3)
8. Cathedral (3)
9. Chaucer (3)
10. College (2)
11. Consort (3)
12. Dockyard (2)
13. Faraday (4)
14. Friary (3)
15. Lyndhurst (3)
16. Newington (3)
17. Riverside (2)
18. Rotherhithe (2)
19. Ruskin (2)
20. Rye (2)
21. St Giles (3)
22. The Lane (3)
23. Waverley (2)

Wards from 4 May 1978 to 2 May 2002:

1. Abbey (2)
2. Alleyn (2)
3. Barset (2)
4. Bellenden (3)
5. Bricklayers (2)
6. Browning (3)
7. Brunswick (3)
8. Burgess (2)
9. Cathedral (2)
10. Chaucer (3)
11. College (2)
12. Consort (2)
13. Dockyard (3)
14. Faraday (3)
15. Friary (3)
16. Liddle (3)
17. Lyndhurst (3)
18. Newington (3)
19. Riverside (3)
20. Rotherhithe (3)
21. Ruskin (3)
22. Rye (2)
23. St Giles (3)
24. The Lane (2)
25. Waverley (2)

Wards from 2 May 2002 to 3 May 2018:

1. Brunswick Park (3)
2. Camberwell Green (3)
3. Cathedrals (3)
4. Chaucer (3)
5. College (3)
6. East Dulwich (3)
7. East Walworth (3)
8. Faraday (3)
9. Grange (3)
10. Livesey (3)
11. Newington (3)
12. Nunhead (3)
13. Peckham (3)
14. Peckham Rye (3)
15. Riverside (3)
16. Rotherhithe (3)
17. South Bermondsey (3)
18. South Camberwell (3)
19. Surrey Docks (3)
20. The Lane (3)
21. Village (3)

Wards from 3 May 2018 to present:

1. Borough & Bankside (3)
2. Camberwell Green (3)
3. Champion Hill (2)
4. Chaucer (3)
5. Dulwich Hill (2)
6. Dulwich Village (2)
7. Dulwich Wood (2)
8. Faraday (3)
9. Goose Green (3)
10. London Bridge & West Bermondsey (3)
11. Newington (3)
12. North Bermondsey (3)
13. North Walworth (3)
14. Nunhead & Queen's Road (3)
15. Old Kent Road (3)
16. Peckham (3)
17. Peckham Rye (2)
18. Rotherhithe (3)
19. Rye Lane (3)
20. South Bermondsey (3)
21. St George's (2)
22. St Giles (3)
23. Surrey Docks (3)

=== Sutton ===
Wards from 1 April 1965 (first election 7 May 1964) to 4 May 1978:

1. Beddington North (2)
2. Beddington South (2)
3. Belmont (2)
4. Carshalton Central (2)
5. Carshalton North East (3)
6. Carshalton North West (2)
7. Carshalton St Helier North (2)
8. Carshalton St Helier South (2)
9. Carshalton St Helier West (2)
10. Carshalton South East (2)
11. Carshalton South West (2)
12. Cheam North (2)
13. Cheam South (2)
14. Cheam West (2)
15. Sutton Central (2)
16. Sutton East (2)
17. Sutton North (2)
18. Sutton North East (2)
19. Sutton South (2)
20. Sutton South East (2)
21. Wallington Central (2)
22. Wallington North (2)
23. Wallington South (2)
24. Worcester Park North (2)
25. Worcester Park South (2)

Wards from 4 May 1978 to 2 May 2002:

1. Beddington North (2)
2. Beddington South (3)
3. Belmont (2)
4. Carshalton Beeches (3)
5. Carshalton Central (2)
6. Carshalton North (2)
7. Cheam South (2)
8. Cheam West (2)
9. Clockhouse (1)
10. North Cheam (2)
11. Rosehill (2)
12. St Helier North (3)
13. St Helier South (2)
14. Sutton Central (2)
15. Sutton Common (2)
16. Sutton East (3)
17. Sutton South (3)
18. Sutton West (2)
19. Wallington North (3)
20. Wallington South (3)
21. Wandle Valley (2)
22. Woodcote (1)
23. Worcester Park North (3)
24. Worcester Park South (2)
25. Wrythe Green (2)

Wards from 2 May 2002 to 5 May 2022:

1. Beddington North (3)
2. Beddington South (3)
3. Belmont (3)
4. Carshalton Central (3)
5. Carshalton South & Clockhouse (3)
6. Cheam (3)
7. Nonsuch (3)
8. St Helier (3)
9. Stonecot (3)
10. Sutton Central (3)
11. Sutton North (3)
12. Sutton South (3)
13. Sutton West (3)
14. The Wrythe (3)
15. Wallington North (3)
16. Wallington South (3)
17. Wandle Valley (3)
18. Worcester Park (3)

Wards from 5 May 2022:

1. Beddington (3)
2. Belmont (3)
3. Carshalton Central (3)
4. Carshalton South & Clockhouse (3)
5. Cheam (3)
6. Hackbridge (2)
7. North Cheam (3)
8. South Beddington & Roundshaw (3)
9. St Helier East (2)
10. St Helier West (3)
11. Stonecot (2)
12. Sutton Central (3)
13. Sutton North (3)
14. Sutton South (3)
15. Sutton West & East Cheam (3)
16. The Wrythe (3)
17. Wallington North (3)
18. Wallington South (3)
19. Worcester Park North (2)
20. Worcester Park South (2)

=== Tower Hamlets ===
Wards from 1 April 1965 (first election 7 May 1964) to 4 May 1978:

1. Bethnal Green Central (3)
2. Bethnal Green East (3)
3. Bethnal Green North (3)
4. Bethnal Green South (3)
5. Bethnal Green West (3)
6. Bow North (2)
7. Bow South (3)
8. Bromley (3)
9. Holy Trinity (3)
10. Limehouse (4)
11. Poplar East (3)
12. Poplar Millwall (2)
13. Poplar South (2)
14. Poplar West (3)
15. Redcoat (3)
16. St Dunstan's (3)
17. St Katherine's (4)
18. St Mary's (3)
19. Shadwell (3)
20. Spitalfields (4)

Wards from 4 May 1978 to 2 May 2002:

1. Blackwall (2)
2. Bow (3)
3. Bromley (3)
4. East India (2)
5. Grove (2)
6. Holy Trinity (3)
7. Lansbury (3)
8. Limehouse (3)
9. Millwall (3)
10. Park (2)
11. Redcoat (2)
12. St Dunstan's (3)
13. St James' (2)
14. St Katharine's (3)
15. St Mary's (2)
16. St Peter's (3)
17. Shadwell (3)
18. Spitalfields (3)
19. Weavers (3)

Wards from 2 May 2002 to 22 May 2014:

1. Bethnal Green North (3)
2. Bethnal Green South (3)
3. Blackwall & Cubitt Town (3)
4. Bow East (3)
5. Bow West (3)
6. Bromley-by-Bow (3)
7. East India & Lansbury (3)
8. Limehouse (3)
9. Mile End & Globe Town (3)
10. Mile End East (3)
11. Millwall (3)
12. St Dunstan's & Stepney Green (3)
13. St Katharine's & Wapping (3)
14. Shadwell (3)
15. Spitalfields & Banglatown (3)
16. Weavers (3)
17. Whitechapel (3)

Wards from 22 May 2014 to present:

1. Bethnal Green (since 2022 Bethnal Green East) (3)
2. Blackwall & Cubitt Town (3)
3. Bow East (3)
4. Bow West (2)
5. Bromley North (2)
6. Bromley South (2)
7. Canary Wharf (2)
8. Island Gardens (2)
9. Lansbury (3)
10. Limehouse (1)
11. Mile End (3)
12. Poplar (1)
13. St Dunstan's (2)
14. St Katharine's & Wapping (2)
15. St Peter's (since 2022 Bethnal Green West) (3)
16. Shadwell (2)
17. Spitalfields & Banglatown (2)
18. Stepney Green (2)
19. Weavers (2)
20. Whitechapel (3)

=== Waltham Forest ===
Wards from 1 April 1965 (first election 7 May 1964) to 4 May 1978:

1. Cann Hall (3)
2. Central (3)
3. Chapel End (3)
4. Chingford Central (3)
5. Chingford North West (3)
6. Chingford South (3)
7. Forest (3)
8. Hale End (3)
9. High Street (3)
10. Higham Hill (3)
11. Hoe Street (3)
12. Lea Bridge (3)
13. Leyton (3)
14. Leytonstone (3)
15. St James Street (3)
16. Wood Street (3)

Wards from 4 May 1978 to 2 May 2002:

1. Cann Hall (3)
2. Cathall (3)
3. Chapel End (3)
4. Chingford Green (3)
5. Endlebury (2)
6. Forest (3)
7. Grove Green (3)
8. Hale End (2)
9. Hatch Lane (3)
10. High Street (3)
11. Higham Hill (2)
12. Hoe Street (3)
13. Larkswood (3)
14. Lea Bridge (3)
15. Leyton (3)
16. Leytonstone (3)
17. Lloyd Park (3)
18. St James Street (3)
19. Valley (3)
20. Wood Street (3)

Wards from 2 May 2002 to 5 May 2022:

1. Cann Hall (3)
2. Cathall (3)
3. Chapel End (3)
4. Chingford Green (3)
5. Endlebury (3)
6. Forest (3)
7. Grove Green (3)
8. Hale End & Highams Park (3)
9. Hatch Lane (3)
10. High Street (3)
11. Higham Hill (3)
12. Hoe Street (3)
13. Larkswood (3)
14. Lea Bridge (3)
15. Leyton (3)
16. Leytonstone (3)
17. Markhouse (3)
18. Valley (3)
19. William Morris (3)
20. Wood Street (3)

Wards from 5 May 2022:

1. Cann Hall (3)
2. Cathall (2)
3. Chapel End (3)
4. Chingford Green (3)
5. Endlebury (2)
6. Forest (3)
7. Grove Green (3)
8. Hale End & Highams Park South (2)
9. Hatch Lane & Highams Park North (3)
10. High Street (3)
11. Higham Hill (3)
12. Hoe Street (3)
13. Larkswood (3)
14. Lea Bridge (3)
15. Leyton (3)
16. Leytonstone (3)
17. Markhouse (2)
18. St James (3)
19. Upper Walthamstow (2)
20. Valley (3)
21. William Morris (3)
22. Wood Street (2)

=== Wandsworth ===
Wards from 1 April 1965 (first election 7 May 1964) to 4 May 1978:

1. Balham (3)
2. Bedford (3)
3. Earlsfield (3)
4. Fairfield (3)
5. Furzedown (3)
6. Graveney (3)
7. Latchmere (3)
8. Nightingale (3)
9. Northcote (3)
10. Putney (3)
11. Queenstown (3)
12. Roehampton (3)
13. St John (3)
14. St Mary's Park (3)
15. Shaftesbury (3)
16. Southfield (3)
17. Springfield (3)
18. Thamesfield (3)
19. Tooting (3)
20. West Hill (3)

Wards from 4 May 1978 to 2 May 2002:

1. Balham (3)
2. Bedford (3)
3. Earlsfield (2)
4. East Putney (3)
5. Fairfield (2)
6. Furzedown (3)
7. Graveney (3)
8. Latchmere (3)
9. Nightingale (3)
10. Northcote (3)
11. Parkside (2)
12. Queenstown (2)
13. Roehampton (3)
14. St John (3)
15. St Mary's Park (3)
16. Shaftesbury (3)
17. Southfield (3)
18. Springfield (3)
19. Thamesfield (3)
20. Tooting (3)
21. West Hill (2)
22. West Putney (3)

Wards from 2 May 2002 to 5 May 2022:

1. Balham (3)
2. Bedford (3)
3. Earlsfield (3)
4. East Putney (3)
5. Fairfield (3)
6. Furzedown (3)
7. Graveney (3)
8. Latchmere (3)
9. Nightingale (3)
10. Northcote (3)
11. Queenstown (3)
12. Roehampton (3); renamed Roehampton & Putney Heath in 2010
13. St Mary's Park (3)
14. Shaftesbury (3)
15. Southfields (3)
16. Thamesfield (3)
17. Tooting (3)
18. Wandsworth Common (3)
19. West Hill (3)
20. West Putney (3)

Wards from 5 May 2022:

1. Balham (3)
2. Battersea Park (3)
3. East Putney (3)
4. Falconbrook (2)
5. Furzedown (3)
6. Lavender (2)
7. Nine Elms (2)
8. Northcote (2)
9. Roehampton (3)
10. Shaftesbury & Queenstown (3)
11. South Balham (2)
12. Southfields (2)
13. St Mary's (3)
14. Thamesfield (3)
15. Tooting Bec (3)
16. Tooting Broadway (3)
17. Trinity (2)
18. Wandle (2)
19. Wandsworth Common (3)
20. Wandsworth Town (3)
21. West Hill (3)
22. West Putney (3)

=== Westminster ===
Wards from 1 April 1965 (first election 7 May 1964) to 9 May 1968:

1. Abbey (1)
2. Alderney (1)
3. Aldwych (1)
4. Baker Street (5)
5. Berkeley (1)
6. Cathedral (1)
7. Cavendish (3)
8. Churchill (1)
9. Church Street (3)
10. Covent Garden (1)
11. Dolphin (1)
12. Eaton (1)
13. Ebury (1)
14. Grosvenor (1)
15. Harrow Road (5)
16. Hyde Park (5)
17. Knightsbridge (1)
18. Lancaster Gate (3)
19. Lords (3)
20. Maida Vale (5)
21. Millbank (1)
22. Queen's Park (2)
23. Regent Street (1)
24. Regent's Park (3)
25. St James's (1)
26. Soho (1)
27. Tachbrook (1)
28. Victoria (1)
29. Warwick (1)
30. Westbourne (3)
31. Wilton (1)

Wards from 9 May 1968 to 4 May 1978:

1. Baker Street (5)
2. Cavendish (3)
3. Charing Cross (2)
4. Churchill (3)
5. Church Street (3)
6. Harrow Road (5)
7. Hyde Park (5)
8. Knightsbridge (3)
9. Lancaster Gate (3)
10. Lords (3)
11. Maida Vale (5)
12. Millbank (2)
13. Queen's Park (2)
14. Regent Street (3)
15. Regent's Park (4)
16. Victoria Street (3)
17. Warwick (3)
18. Westbourne (3)

Wards from 4 May 1978 to 2 May 2002:

1. Baker Street (2)
2. Bayswater (3)
3. Belgrave (2)
4. Bryanston (2)
5. Cavendish (3)
6. Church Street (3)
7. Churchill (3)
8. Hamilton Terrace (2)
9. Harrow Road (3)
10. Hyde Park (3)
11. Knightsbridge (2)
12. Lancaster Gate (3)
13. Little Venice (3)
14. Lord's (2)
15. Maida Vale (3)
16. Millbank (3)
17. Queen's Park (3)
18. Regent's Park (3)
19. St George's (3)
20. St James's (2)
21. Victoria (2)
22. West End (2)
23. Westbourne (3)

Wards from 2 May 2002 to 5 May 2022:

1. Abbey Road (3)
2. Bayswater (3)
3. Bryanston & Dorset Square (3)
4. Church Street (3)
5. Churchill (3)
6. Harrow Road (3)
7. Hyde Park (3)
8. Knightsbridge & Belgravia (3)
9. Lancaster Gate (3)
10. Little Venice (3)
11. Maida Vale (3)
12. Marylebone High Street (3)
13. Queen's Park (3)
14. Regent's Park (3)
15. St James's (3)
16. Tachbrook (3)
17. Vincent Square (3)
18. Warwick (3)
19. West End (3)
20. Westbourne (3)

Wards from 5 May 2022:

1. Abbey Road (3)
2. Bayswater (3)
3. Church Street (3)
4. Harrow Road (3)
5. Hyde Park (3)
6. Knightsbridge & Belgravia (3)
7. Lancaster Gate (3)
8. Little Venice (3)
9. Maida Vale (3)
10. Marylebone (3)
11. Pimlico North (3)
12. Pimlico South (3)
13. Queen's Park (3)
14. Regent's Park (3)
15. St James's (3)
16. Vincent Square (3)
17. West End (3)
18. Westbourne (3)

== Sui generis council ==
=== City of London ===
Wards from March 2003 to 21 March 2013:

1. Aldgate (5)
2. Aldersgate (5)
3. Bassishaw (3)
4. Billingsgate (2)
5. Bishopsgate (8)
6. Bread Street (2)
7. Bridge & Bridge Without (2)
8. Broad Street (3)
9. Candlewick (2)
10. Castle Baynard (7)
11. Cheap (2)
12. Coleman Street (5)
13. Cordwainer (3)
14. Cornhill (2)
15. Cripplegate (9)
16. Dowgate (2)
17. Farringdon Within (8)
18. Farringdon Without (10)
19. Langbourn (2)
20. Lime Street (3)
21. Portsoken (4)
22. Queenhithe (2)
23. Tower (5)
24. Vintry (2)
25. Walbrook (2)

All wards elect one alderman.

Wards from 21 March 2013 to present:

1. Aldgate (5)
2. Aldersgate (6)
3. Bassishaw (2)
4. Billingsgate (2)
5. Bishopsgate (6)
6. Bread Street (2)
7. Bridge & Bridge Without (2)
8. Broad Street (3)
9. Candlewick (2)
10. Castle Baynard (8)
11. Cheap (3)
12. Coleman Street (4)
13. Cordwainer (3)
14. Cornhill (3)
15. Cripplegate (8)
16. Dowgate (2)
17. Farringdon Within (8)
18. Farringdon Without (10)
19. Langbourn (3)
20. Lime Street (4)
21. Portsoken (4)
22. Queenhithe (2)
23. Tower (4)
24. Vintry (2)
25. Walbrook (2)

All wards elect one alderman.

== Former council ==
=== Greater London Council ===
Electoral divisions from 1 April 1965 (first election 9 April 1964) to 12 April 1973:

1. Barking (2)
2. Barnet (4)
3. Bexley (3)
4. Brent (3)
5. Bromley (4)
6. Camden (3)
7. Croydon (4)
8. Ealing (4)
9. Enfield (3)
10. Greenwich (3)
11. Hackney (3)
12. Hammersmith (3)
13. Haringey (3)
14. Harrow (3)
15. Havering (3)
16. Hillingdon (3)
17. Hounslow (3)
18. Islington (3)
19. Kensington & Chelsea (3)
20. Kingston upon Thames (2)
21. Lambeth (4)
22. Lewisham (4)
23. Merton (2)
24. Newham (3)
25. Redbridge (3)
26. Richmond upon Thames (2)
27. Southwark (4)
28. Sutton (2)
29. Tower Hamlets (2)
30. Waltham Forest (3)
31. Wandsworth (4)
32. Westminster & the City of London (4)

Electoral divisions from 12 April 1973 to 1 April 1986 (council abolished):

1. Barking (1)
2. Barking, Dagenham (1)
3. Barnet, Chipping Barnet (1)
4. Barnet, Finchley (1)
5. Barnet, Hendon North (1)
6. Barnet, Hendon South (1)
7. Bexley, Bexleyheath (1)
8. Bexley, Erith & Crayford (1)
9. Bexley, Sidcup (1)
10. Brent East (1)
11. Brent North (1)
12. Brent South (1)
13. Bromley, Beckenham (1)
14. Bromley, Chislehurst (1)
15. Bromley, Orpington (1)
16. Bromley, Ravensbourne (1)
17. Camden, Hampstead (1)
18. Camden, Holborn & St Pancras South (1)
19. Camden, St Pancras North (1)
20. Croydon Central (1)
21. Croydon North East (1)
22. Croydon North West (1)
23. Croydon South (1)
24. Ealing, Acton (1)
25. Ealing North (1)
26. Ealing, Southall (1)
27. Enfield, Edmonton (1)
28. Enfield North (1)
29. Enfield, Southgate (1)
30. Greenwich (1)
31. Greenwich, Woolwich East (1)
32. Greenwich, Woolwich West (1)
33. Hackney Central (1)
34. Hackney North & Stoke Newington (1)
35. Hackney South & Shoreditch (1)
36. Hammersmith, Fulham (1)
37. Hammersmith North (1)
38. Haringey, Hornsey (1)
39. Haringey, Tottenham (1)
40. Haringey, Wood Green (1)
41. Harrow Central (1)
42. Harrow East (1)
43. Harrow West (1)
44. Havering, Hornchurch (1)
45. Havering, Romford (1)
46. Havering, Upminster (1)
47. Hillingdon, Hayes & Harlington (1)
48. Hillingdon, Ruislip-Northwood (1)
49. Hillingdon, Uxbridge (1)
50. Hounslow, Brentford & Isleworth (1)
51. Hounslow, Feltham & Heston (1)
52. Islington Central (1)
53. Islington North (1)
54. Islington South & Finsbury (1)
55. Kensington & Chelsea, Chelsea (1)
56. Kensington & Chelsea, Kensington (1)
57. Kingston upon Thames (1)
58. Kingston upon Thames, Surbiton (1)
59. Lambeth Central (1)
60. Lambeth, Norwood (1)
61. Lambeth, Streatham (1)
62. Lambeth, Vauxhall (1)
63. Lewisham, Deptford (1)
64. Lewisham East (1)
65. Lewisham West (1)
66. Merton, Mitcham & Morden (1)
67. Merton, Wimbledon (1)
68. Newham, North-East (1)
69. Newham, North-West (1)
70. Newham South (1)
71. Redbridge, Ilford North (1)
72. Redbridge, Ilford South (1)
73. Redbridge, Wanstead & Woodford (1)
74. Richmond upon Thames, Richmond (1)
75. Richmond upon Thames, Twickenham (1)
76. Southwark, Bermondsey (1)
77. Southwark, Dulwich (1)
78. Southwark, Peckham (1)
79. Sutton & Cheam (1)
80. Sutton, Carshalton (1)
81. Tower Hamlets, Bethnal Green & Bow (1)
82. Tower Hamlets, Stepney & Poplar (1)
83. Waltham Forest, Chingford (1)
84. Waltham Forest, Leyton (1)
85. Waltham Forest, Walthamstow (1)
86. Wandsworth, Battersea North (1)
87. Wandsworth, Battersea South (1)
88. Wandsworth, Putney (1)
89. Wandsworth, Tooting (1)
90. The City of London & Westminster South (1)
91. City of Westminster, Paddington (1)
92. City of Westminster, St Marylebone (1)

== Regional assembly ==
=== London Assembly ===
Assembly constituencies from 3 July 2000 (first election 4 May 2000) to present:

1. Barnet & Camden (1)
2. Bexley & Bromley (1)
3. Brent & Harrow (1)
4. City & East (1)
5. Croydon & Sutton (1)
6. Ealing & Hillingdon (1)
7. Enfield & Haringey (1)
8. Greenwich & Lewisham (1)
9. Havering & Redbridge (1)
10. Lambeth & Southwark (1)
11. Merton & Wandsworth (1)
12. North East (1)
13. South West (1)
14. West Central (1)

There are also 11 London-wide assembly members elected.

== See also ==
- List of parliamentary constituencies in London
