= Edmonton Green =

Edmonton Green may refer to:

- Edmonton, London, an area of London, United Kingdom
  - Edmonton Green Shopping Centre
  - Edmonton Green railway station, the station which reflected the informal name to Edmonton
  - Edmonton Green (ward)
