= Edgware (disambiguation) =

Edgware is a town in the London Borough of Barnet.

Edgware may also refer to:

- Edgware tube station, the terminus for the Northern line in London
- Edgware Road, which runs from Marble Arch to Edgware in London
- Edgware Road tube station (Bakerloo line), on the Edgware Road
- Edgware Road tube station (Circle, District and Hammersmith & City lines), also on the Edgware Road
- Edgware (Barnet ward)
- Edgware (Harrow ward)
- Lord Edgware, a character in the novel Lord Edgware Dies by Agatha Christie

== See also ==
- Edgeware, suburb of Christchurch, New Zealand
