= Ladywell (ward) =

Electoral ward in London, England

- Electoral ward for the Lewisham London Borough Council
- Borough: Lewisham
- County: Greater London
- Population: 15,575 (2021)
- Major settlements: Ladywell
- Area: 1.983 km²

Current electoral ward
- Created: 1965
- Councillors: 3

Ladywell is an electoral ward in the Borough of Lewisham. The ward was first used in the 1964 elections and elects three councillors to Lewisham London Borough Council.

== Geography ==
The ward is named after the Ladywell area.

== Councillors ==
Election	Councillors		
2022	Bill Brown (Labour)	Laura Cunningham (Labour)	Liz Johnston-Franklin (Labour)

== Elections ==
=== 2022 ===
Ladywell (3)
Party	Candidate	Votes	%	±%
Labour	Laura Cunningham	2,151	50.5	
Labour	Liz-Johnston-Franklin*	1,950	45.7	
Labour	Bill Brown*	1,930	45.3	
Green	Dorothy Stein	1,810	42.5	
Green	Nick Humberstone	1,786	41.9	
Green	Tim Crossley	1,759	41.3	
Liberal Democrats	Jean Burnell	322	7.6	
Conservative	Ian Harris	277	6.5	
Conservative	Maria-Lidia McInnes	267	6.3	
Conservative	Neil Weatherall	231	5.4	
Liberal Democrats	Tony Lloyd	165	3.9	
Liberal Democrats	Andy Smith	140	3.3	
Turnout			42.2	
Labour hold		Swing		
Labour hold		Swing		
Labour hold		Swing		
