= Southgate (ward) =

Electoral ward in London, England

- Electoral ward for the Enfield London Borough Council
- Borough: Enfield
- County: Greater London
- Population: 14,515 (2021)
- Major settlements: Southgate
- Area: 2.635 km²

Current electoral ward
- Created: 2002
- Councillors: 3

Southgate is an electoral ward in the London Borough of Enfield. The ward was first used in the 2002 elections and elects three councillors to Enfield London Borough Council.

== Geography ==
The ward is named after the suburb of Southgate, London.

== Councillors ==
Election	Councillors		
2022	Stephanos Ioannou (Conservative)	Chris Joannides (Conservative)	Elisa Morreale (Conservative)

== Elections ==
=== 2026 ===
Southgate (3)
Party	Candidate	Votes	%	±%
Labour	Ardil Akgul			
Labour	Carl Bayliss			
Reform	Cameron Corrigan			
Green	Charith Gunawardena			
Liberal Democrats	Paul Hsu			
Conservative	Stephanos Ioannou			
Conservative	Chris Joannides			
Green	Katie Knight			
Conservative	Elisa Morreale			
Labour	Gary Ogin			
Reform	Deborah Palmer			
Green	Meraaj Sadath			
Liberal Democrats	Alan Stainer			
Liberal Democrats	Lorice Stainer			
Reform	Elliott Stein			
Turnout				

=== 2022 ===
Southgate (3)
Party	Candidate	Votes	%	±%
Conservative	Stephanos Ioannou	1,915	43.0	
Conservative	Chris Joannides	1,751	39.3	
Conservative	Elisa Morreale	1,654	37.1	
Labour	Christine Hamilton	1,365	30.6	
Labour	Harry Redmond	1,340	30.1	
Green	Charith Gunawardena	1,268	28.5	
Labour	Gary Ogin	1,183	26.6	
Green	Georgia Elliott-Smith	1,097	24.6	
Green	Nigel Watson	840	18.9	
Liberal Democrats	Richard Mapleston	342	7.7	
Liberal Democrats	Sanjay Mazumder	317	7.1	
Liberal Democrats	Diana Medlicott	293	6.6	
Turnout			44.5	
Conservative hold		Swing		
Conservative gain from Labour		Swing		
Conservative gain from Labour		Swing		
