= Cheam (ward) =

Electoral ward in London, England

- Electoral ward for the Sutton London Borough Council
- Borough: London Borough of Sutton
- County: Greater London
- Population: 10,690 (2021)
- Major settlements: Cheam
- Area: 3.938 km²

Current electoral ward
- Created: 2002
- Seats: 3
- Created from: Beddington North, Beddington South

Cheam is an electoral ward in the London Borough of Sutton. The ward was first used in the 2002 elections and elects three councillors to Sutton London Borough Council.

== Geography ==
The ward is named after the suburb of Cheam.

== Councillors ==
Election	Councillors		
2022	Eric Allen (Conservative)	Tony Shields (Conservative)	Vanessa Udall (Conservative)

== Elections ==
=== 2022 ===
Cheam (3)
Party	Candidate	Votes	%	±%
Conservative	Eric Allen*	1,747	51.7	
Conservative	Tony Shields	1,680	49.7	
Conservative	Vanessa Udall	1,635	48.4	
Liberal Democrats	Alex Chui	1,213	35.9	
Liberal Democrats	Ben Devlin	1,168	34.6	
Liberal Democrats	Harry Legge	1,002	29.7	
Labour	Sarah McGuinness	486	14.4	
Green	John Triggs	466	13.8	
Labour	Simon Muir	373	11.0	
Labour	George Richards	364	10.8	
Turnout				
Conservative hold				
Conservative hold				
Conservative hold				

== See also ==
- List of electoral wards in Greater London
