= Downham (ward) =

Electoral ward in London, England

- Electoral ward for the Lewisham London Borough Council
- Borough: Lewisham
- County: Greater London
- Population: 18,359 (2021)
- Major settlements: Downham, London
- Area: 2.575 km²

Current electoral ward
- Created: 1978
- Councillors: 3

Downham is an electoral ward in the London Borough of Lewisham. The ward was first used in the 1978 elections and elects three councillors to Lewisham London Borough Council.

== Geography ==
The ward is named after the Downham Estate area.

== Councillors ==
Election	Councillors		
2022	Andre Bourne (Labour)	Coral Howard (Labour)	Oana Olaru-Holmes (Labour)

== Elections ==
=== 2022 ===
Downham (3)
Party	Candidate	Votes	%	±%
Labour	Andre Bourne*	1,679	60.2	
Labour	Coral Howard*	1,621	58.1	
Labour	Oana Olaru	1,442	51.7	
Conservative	Kwame Asabere	713	25.6	
Conservative	Chris Wilford	546	19.6	
Conservative	Junior Leachman	510	18.3	
Green	Sue Luxton	398	14.3	
Liberal Democrats	Danny Dignan	335	12.0	
Green	Emily Woodhouse	309	11.1	
Green	Inke Schreiber	281	10.1	
Liberal Democrats	Joan Labrom	279	10.0	
Liberal Democrats	Mike Patel	251	9.0	
Turnout			25.4	
Labour hold		Swing		
Labour hold		Swing		
Labour hold		Swing		
