= Sydenham (ward) =

Electoral ward in London, England

- Electoral ward for the Lewisham London Borough Council
- Borough: Lewisham
- County: Greater London
- Population: 16,975 (2021)
- Major settlements: Sydenham, London
- Area: 1.803 km²

Current electoral ward
- Created: 2002
- Councillors: 3

Sydenham is an electoral ward in the Borough of Lewisham. The ward was first used in the 2002 elections and elects three councillors to Lewisham London Borough Council.

== Geography ==
The ward is named after the Sydenham, London area.

== Councillors ==
Election	Councillors		
2022	Chris Best (Labour)	Liam Curran (Labour)	Jack Lavery (Labour)

== Elections ==
=== 2022 ===
Sydenham (3)
Party	Candidate	Votes	%	±%
Labour	Chris Best*	2,456	63.2	
Labour	Liam Curran*	2,132	54.9	
Labour	Jack Lavery	2,026	52.2	
Green	Sue Austin	1,267	32.6	
Green	Nick Lee	858	22.1	
Conservative	Ross Archer	625	16.1	
Liberal Democrats	Michael Bachmann	534	13.8	
Liberal Democrats	Margot Wilson	495	12.7	
Conservative	Dickon Prior	475	12.2	
Conservative	Raymond Squires	446	11.5	
Liberal Democrats	Adam Bull	336	8.7	
Turnout			34.8	
Labour hold		Swing		
Labour hold		Swing		
Labour hold		Swing		
