= Queen's Gate (ward) =

Electoral ward in London, England

- Electoral ward for the Kensington and Chelsea London Borough Council
- Borough: Kensington and Chelsea
- County: Greater London
- Population: 7,906 (2021)
- Major settlements: Queen's Gate
- Area: 0.5966 km²

Current electoral ward
- Created: 1965
- Councillors: 3

Queen's Gate is an electoral ward in the Royal Borough of Kensington and Chelsea. The ward was first used in the 1964 elections and elects three councillors to Kensington and Chelsea London Borough Council.

== History ==
Queen's Gate is a Conservative-voting ward.

== Geography ==
The ward is named after the Queen's Gate area.

== Councillors ==
Election	Councillors		
2022	Roberto Weeden-Sanz (Conservative)	Will Lane (Conservative)	Sam Mackover (Conservative)

== Elections ==
=== 2026 ===
Queen's Gate (3)
Party	Candidate	Votes	%	±%
Conservative	Sam Mackover	1,075	68.3	
Conservative	Max Dodd-Noble	1,051	66.8	
Conservative	Ned Whitley	994	63.2	
Liberal Democrats	Sheila McGuirk	203	12.9	
Green	Max Dunne	193	12.3	
Liberal Democrats	Luke Woollen	161	10.2	
Labour	Linda Reid	151	9.6	
Labour	Bob Mingay	134	8.5	
Liberal Democrats	Pawel Urbanski	128	8.1	
Reform	Kezia Noble	120	7.6	
Reform	Thomas Walker	115	7.3	
Labour	Keith Stirling	104	6.6	
Reform	Juliet Zhong	102	6.5	
Turnout			36.0	
Conservative hold		Swing		
Conservative hold		Swing		
Conservative hold		Swing		

=== 2022 ===
Queen's Gate (3)
Party	Candidate	Votes	%	±%
Conservative	Roberto Weeden-Sanz	966	59.0	−8.7
Conservative	Will Lane	955	58.3	−8.4
Conservative	Sam Mackover	942	57.5	−8.9
Liberal Democrats	Blaise Baquiche	548	33.5	+15.6
Labour	Lenore Robinson	331	20.2	+6.1
Labour	Tim Thomas	260	15.9	+2.4
Labour	Hassan Muhammad	252	15.4	+2.8
Turnout			34.7	
Conservative hold		Swing		
Conservative hold		Swing		
Conservative hold		Swing		

=== 2018 ===
Queen’s Gate 2018 (3)
Party	Candidate	Votes	%	±%
Conservative	Max Chauhan	1,126		
Conservative	Matthew Palmer	1,110		
Conservative	Max Woodger	1,105		
Liberal Democrats	Jill Manasseh	497		
Liberal Democrats	Sheila McGuirk	278		
Liberal Democrats	Noel McNamara	243		
Labour	Carmen Callil	235		
Labour	Emma Southby	224		
Labour	Soonu Engineer	210		
Democrats and Veterans	Ralph Hancock	27		

=== 2014 ===
Queen’s Gate 2014 (3)
Party	Candidate	Votes	%	±%
Conservative	Sam Mackover	1,123		
Conservative	Daniel Moylan	1,093		
Conservative	Matthew Palmer	1,017		
Labour	Annabelle Louvros	194		
Liberal Democrats	Philippa Manasseh	194		
Liberal Democrats	Barry Brown	175		
Labour	Soonu Engineer	168		
Labour	Bob Mingay	151		

== See also ==
- List of electoral wards in Greater London
