= Bellingham (Lewisham ward) =

Electoral ward in London, England

- Electoral ward for the Lewisham London Borough Council
- Borough: Lewisham
- County: Greater London
- Population: 11,661 (2021)
- Major settlements: Bellingham, London
- Area: 2.291 km²

Current electoral ward
- Created: 1965
- Councillors: 2 (since 2022); 3 (2002-2022); 2 (1965-2002)

Bellingham is an electoral ward in the Borough of Lewisham. The ward was first used in the 1964 elections and elects two councillors to Lewisham London Borough Council.

== Geography ==
The ward is named after the Bellingham area.

== Councillors ==
Election	Councillors	
2022	Rachel Onikosi (Labour)	Jacq Paschoud (Labour)

== Elections ==
=== 2022 ===
Bellingham (2)
Party	Candidate	Votes	%	±%
Labour	Rachel Onikosi	1,209	80.4	
Labour	Jacq Paschoud*	925	61.5	
Conservative	Craig Barrett	270	18.0	
Liberal Democrats	Sarah Morris	199	13.2	
Liberal Democrats	Ryan McMichael	160	10.6	
Conservative	Paul Treaddell	149	9.9	
CPA	Katherine Hortense	94	6.3	
Turnout			23.2	
Labour hold		Swing		
Labour hold		Swing		
