= Telegraph Hill (ward) =

Electoral ward in London, England

- Electoral ward for the Lewisham London Borough Council
- Borough: Lewisham
- County: Greater London
- Population: 16,914 (2021)
- Major settlements: Telegraph Hill, Lewisham
- Area: 1.545 km²

Current electoral ward
- Created: 2002
- Councillors: 3

Telegraph Hill is an electoral ward in the Borough of Lewisham. The ward was first used in the 2002 elections and elects three councillors to Lewisham London Borough Council.

== Geography ==
The ward is named after the Telegraph Hill area.

== Councillors ==
Election	Councillors		
2022	Paul Bell (Labour)	Joan Millbank (Labour)	Luke Sorba (Labour)

== Elections ==
=== 2022 ===
Telegraph Hill (3)
Party	Candidate	Votes	%	±%
Labour	Joan Millbank*	2,777	76.5	
Labour	Paul Bell*	2,541	70.0	
Labour	Luke Sorba*	2,139	58.9	
Green	Sarah Carter	1,448	39.9	
Green	Gabriel Krenzer	990	27.3	
Liberal Democrats	Averil Leimon	366	10.1	
Liberal Democrats	Kit Lloyd	293	8.1	
Conservative	Brendan Almqvist	153	4.2	
Conservative	Isaac Sackey	94	2.6	
Conservative	Anne Yeboah-Sackey	92	2.5	
Turnout			34.7	
Labour hold		Swing		
Labour hold		Swing		
Labour hold		Swing		
