= Haselbury (ward) =

Electoral ward in London, England

- Electoral ward for the Enfield London Borough Council
- Borough: Enfield
- County: Greater London
- Population: 18,135 (2021)
- Area: 1.979 km²

Current electoral ward
- Created: 2002
- Councillors: 3

Haselbury is an electoral ward in the London Borough of Enfield. The ward was first used in the 2002 elections and elects three councillors to Enfield London Borough Council.

== Geography ==
The ward is named after the Haselbury Road area.

== Councillors ==
Election	Councillors		
2022	Mahym Bedekova (Labour)	Mustafa Cetinkaya (Labour) (Independent since 2025)	George Savva (Labour)

== Elections ==
=== 2026 ===
Haselbury (3)
Party	Candidate	Votes	%	±%
Liberal Democrats	Lenuta Abdullah			
Labour	Mahym Bedekova			
Conservative	Christine Bellas			
Labour	Ibrahim Cam			
Independent	Mustafa Cetinkaya			
Enfield Community Independents	Oktay Cinpolat			
Conservative	Frank Greene			
Conservative	Clare Grierson			
Enfield Community Independents	Akis Hajittofi			
Reform	Peter Holder			
Green	Douglas Knight			
Liberal Democrats	Brendan Malone			
Liberal Democrats	Richard Morgan-Ash			
Reform	Peter Rust			
Labour	George Savva			
Communist League Election Campaign	Dag Tirsen			
Reform	Bassey Williams			
Enfield Community Independents	Daniel Zsombor			
Turnout				

=== 2022 ===
Haselbury (3)
Party	Candidate	Votes	%	±%
Labour	Mustafa Cetinkaya	2,039	68.2	
Labour	George Savva	2,019	67.5	
Labour	Mahym Bedekova	2,012	67.3	
Conservative	Clayton Barnes	751	25.1	
Conservative	Clare Spring	694	23.2	
Green	Alison Phillips	579	19.4	
Liberal Democrats	Hannah Dawson	342	11.4	
Liberal Democrats	Richard Morgan-Ash	270	9.0	
Liberal Democrats	Lenuta Abdullah	269	9.0	
Turnout			30.0	
Labour hold		Swing		
Labour hold		Swing		
Labour hold		Swing		
