= Campden (ward) =

Electoral ward in London, England

- Electoral ward for the Kensington and Chelsea London Borough Council
- Borough: Kensington and Chelsea
- County: Greater London
- Population: 8,624 (2021)
- Area: 1.043 km²

Current electoral ward
- Created: 1974
- Councillors: 3

Campden is an electoral ward in the Royal Borough of Kensington and Chelsea. The ward was first used in the 1974 elections and elects three councillors to Kensington and Chelsea London Borough Council.

== Geography ==
The ward is named after the Campden area.

== Councillors ==
Election	Councillors		
2022	Catherine Faulks (Conservative)	Preety Hudd (Conservative)	Lloyd North (Conservative)

== Elections ==
=== 2022 ===
Campden (3)
Party	Candidate	Votes	%	±%
Conservative	Catherine Faulks	1,122	58.6	−4.9
Conservative	Preety Hudd	1,026	53.6	−9.8
Conservative	Lloyd North	995	52.0	−7.8
Labour	Margaret McDonald	417	21.8	+8.6
Labour	Heathcote Ruthann	365	19.1	+6.1
Liberal Democrats	Juan Carrizosa	343	17.9	+2.8
Liberal Democrats	Elizabeth Wade	341	17.8	+4.8
Labour	Tabatha Vaughan	333	17.4	+2.6
Green	Luke Douglas-Home	294	15.4	N/A
Liberal Democrats	Christopher Coplans	292	15.3	+4.2
Turnout			35.6	
Conservative hold		Swing		
Conservative hold		Swing		
Conservative hold		Swing		

== See also ==
- List of electoral wards in Greater London
