= Golborne (ward) =

Electoral ward in London, England

- Electoral ward for the Kensington and Chelsea London Borough Council
- Borough: Kensington and Chelsea
- County: Greater London
- Population: 8,803 (2021)
- Area: 0.5617 km²

Current electoral ward
- Created: 1965
- Number of members: 3
- Councillors: Sina Lari; Mona Adam; Abdullahi Nur

Golborne is an electoral ward in the Royal Borough of Kensington and Chelsea. The ward was first used in the 1964 elections and elects three councillors to Kensington and Chelsea London Borough Council.

== List of councillors ==
| Election | Councillors | | |
|---|---|---|---|
| 2022 | Mona Adam (Labour) (Green since 2023) | Sina Lari (Labour) | Abdullahi Nur (Labour) |

== Kensington and Chelsea council elections ==
=== 2022 election ===
The election took place on 5 May 2022.

2022 Kensington and Chelsea London Borough Council election: Golborne
| Party | Candidate | Votes | % | ±% |
|---|---|---|---|---|
| Labour | Mona Adam | 1,036 | 69.1 | −8.4 |
| Labour | Sina Lari | 1,005 | 67.0 | −1.9 |
| Labour | Abdullahi Nur | 950 | 63.4 | −10.1 |
| Conservative | Elizabeth Acka | 297 | 19.8 | +5.7 |
| Conservative | Margaret Parker | 278 | 18.5 | +5.5 |
| Conservative | Michael Walsh | 259 | 17.3 | +5.4 |
| Liberal Democrats | Sheila McGuirk | 160 | 10.7 | +2.8 |
| Liberal Democrats | William Somers | 133 | 8.9 | +2.8 |
| Turnout | | | 25.2 | |
| Labour hold | | Swing | | |
| Labour hold | | Swing | | |
| Labour hold | | Swing | | |

=== 2018 election ===
The election took place on 3 May 2018.

2018 Kensington and Chelsea London Borough Council election: Golborne
| Party | Candidate | Votes | % | ±% |
|---|---|---|---|---|
| Labour | Emma Dent Coad | 1,585 | 77.5 | +8.0 |
| Labour | Pat Mason | 1,503 | 73.5 | +4.4 |
| Labour | Sina Lari | 1,409 | 68.9 | +6.8 |
| Conservative | Will Mumby | 288 | 14.1 | −0.4 |
| Conservative | Georgina Stewart | 267 | 13.0 | −0.7 |
| Conservative | David Mytton | 243 | 11.9 | −1.5 |
| Liberal Democrats | Frances Owen | 161 | 7.9 | +1.4 |
| Liberal Democrats | Andre Petrolo | 125 | 6.1 | N/A |
| Liberal Democrats | Rosemary Somers | 109 | 5.3 | +1.5 |
| Turnout | | | | |
| Labour hold | | Swing | | |
| Labour hold | | Swing | | |
| Labour hold | | Swing | | |

=== 2014 election ===
The election took place on 22 May 2014.

2014 Kensington and Chelsea London Borough Council election: Golborne
| Party | Candidate | Votes | % | ±% |
|---|---|---|---|---|
| Labour | Emma Dent Coad | 1,229 | 69.5 | |
| Labour | Pat Mason | 1,223 | 69.1 | |
| Labour | Bevan Powell | 1,099 | 62.1 | |
| Green | Benjamin Parker | 260 | 14.7 | |
| Conservative | Jeremy Edge | 256 | 14.5 | |
| Conservative | Melanie Panzone | 243 | 13.7 | |
| Conservative | Max Chauhan | 237 | 13.4 | |
| Independent | Thee Montgomerie-Anderson | 117 | 6.6 | |
| Liberal Democrats | Frances Owen | 115 | 6.5 | |
| Liberal Democrats | Rosemary Somers | 67 | 3.8 | |
| Turnout | | 28.8 | 1,769 | |
| Labour win (new boundaries) | | | | |
| Labour win (new boundaries) | | | | |
| Labour win (new boundaries) | | | | |

== See also ==
- List of electoral wards in Greater London
