= Lee Green (ward) =

Electoral ward in London, England

- Electoral ward for the Lewisham London Borough Council
- Borough: Lewisham
- County: Greater London
- Population: 15,015 (2021)
- Major settlements: Lee Green
- Area: 1.810 km²

Current electoral ward
- Created: 2002
- Councillors: 3

Lee Green is an electoral ward in the Borough of Lewisham. The ward was first used in the 2002 elections and elects three councillors to Lewisham London Borough Council.

== Geography ==
The ward is named after the Lee Green area.

== Councillors ==
| Election | Councillors | | |
|---|---|---|---|
| 2022 | Ese Erheriene (Labour) | Eva Kestner (Labour) | James Rathbone (Labour) |

== Elections ==
=== 2022 ===
Lee Green (3)
| Party | Candidate | Votes | % | ±% |
|---|---|---|---|---|
| Labour | Ese Erheriene | 1,970 | 48.1 | |
| Labour | Eva Kestner | 1,796 | 43.9 | |
| Labour | James Rathbone* | 1,672 | 40.9 | |
| Liberal Democrats | Lizzie Fox | 1,267 | 31.0 | |
| Liberal Democrats | James Foulkes | 1,090 | 26.6 | |
| Liberal Democrats | Paul Olding | 862 | 21.1 | |
| Green | Imogen Solly | 714 | 17.5 | |
| Green | Miki Jablkowska | 687 | 16.8 | |
| Green | Richard Freestow | 679 | 16.6 | |
| Conservative | Teresa Bentinck | 603 | 14.7 | |
| Conservative | Helen Rowley | 448 | 10.9 | |
| Conservative | Sam Thurgood | 392 | 9.6 | |
| CPA | Maureen Martin | 95 | 2.3 | |
| Turnout | | | 42.2 | |
| Labour hold | | Swing | | |
| Labour hold | | Swing | | |
| Labour hold | | Swing | | |
