= Bethnal Green East (1965 ward) =

- Former electoral ward for the Tower Hamlets London Borough Council
- Borough: Tower Hamlets
- County: Greater London
- Population: 9,840 (1966 estimate)
- Electorate: 7,147 (1964); 6,454 (1968); 6,011 (1971); 5,587 (1974)
- Area: 232.5 acres (0.941 km^{2})

Former electoral ward
- Created: 1965
- Abolished: 1978
- Councillors: 3

External image
- Map showing Bethnal Green East ward boundaries from 1965 to 1978

Bethnal Green East was an electoral ward in the London Borough of Tower Hamlets. The ward was created in 1965 and abolished in 1978. It ward was first used in the 1964 elections and last used for the 1974 elections. It returned councillors to Tower Hamlets London Borough Council. In 2022, the ward of Bethnal Green was renamed and has since been called Bethnal Green East.

== Tower Hamlets council elections ==
=== 1974 election ===
The election took place on 2 May 1974.

1974 Tower Hamlets London Borough Council election: Bethnal Green East
Party	Candidate	Votes	%	±%
Labour	E. Bishop	601		
Labour	L. Brazier	593		
Labour	G. Browne	593		
Liberal	D. Williams	312		
Liberal	S. Jayes	311		
Majority				
Turnout		5,587	17.9	
Labour hold		Swing		
Labour hold		Swing		
Labour hold		Swing		

=== 1971 election ===
The election took place on 13 May 1971.

=== 1968 election ===
The election took place on 9 May 1968.

1968 Tower Hamlets London Borough Council election: Bethnal Green East
Party	Candidate	Votes	%	±%
Labour	E. Bishop	Unopposed		
Labour	G. Browne	Unopposed		
Labour	P. Walker	Unopposed		
Registered electors		7,147		
Labour hold				
Labour hold				
Labour hold				

=== 1964 election ===
The election took place on 7 May 1964.

1964 Tower Hamlets London Borough Council election: Bethnal Green East
Party	Candidate	Votes	%	±%
Labour	E. Bishop	Unopposed		
Labour	G. Browne	Unopposed		
Labour	A. Jacob	Unopposed		
Registered electors		7,147		
Labour win (new seat)				
Labour win (new seat)				
Labour win (new seat)				
