= Golders Green (ward) =

Electoral division in north London

- Electoral ward for the Barnet London Borough Council
- Golders Green ward boundaries since 2022
- Borough: Barnet
- County: Greater London
- Population: 14,744 (2021) (Note: 2021 Census data reported for 2022 ward boundaries)
- Electorate: 8,621 (2022)
- Area: 1.578 square kilometres (0.609 sq mi)

Current electoral ward
- Created: 1965
- Number of members: 2
- Councillors: Dean Cohen; Peter Zinkin
- GSS code: E05013642

Golders Green is an electoral ward in the London Borough of Barnet. The ward was first used in the 1964 elections. It returns councillors to Barnet London Borough Council.

== Barnet council elections since 2022 ==
There was a revision of ward boundaries in Barnet in 2022.

=== 2023 by-election ===
The by-election was held on 6 February 2023, following the death of Melvin Cohen.

2023 Golders Green by-election
Party	Candidate	Votes	%	±%
Conservative	Peter Zinkin	1,623	66.8	▲1.6
Labour	Sue Waller	547	22.5	▲3.0
Rejoin EU	Brendan Donnelly	99	4.1	New
Green	Gabrielle Bailey	94	3.9	▼2.3
Liberal Democrats	James Goldman	65	2.7	▼2.0
Majority		1,076	44.3	
Turnout				
Conservative hold		Swing		

=== 2022 election ===
The election took place on 5 May 2022.

2022 Barnet London Borough Council election: Golders Green
Party	Candidate	Votes	%	±%
Conservative	Dean Cohen	2,171	68.4	
Conservative	Melvin Cohen	2,146	67.6	
Labour	Karen Walkden	650	20.5	
Labour	Susan Waller	613	19.3	
Green	Adele Ward	205	6.5	
Liberal Democrats	Penny Gostyn	190	6.0	
Liberal Democrats	Simon Shaer	156	4.9	
Women's Equality	Debbie Brazil	113	3.6	
Turnout		3,175	36.8	
Conservative win (new boundaries)				
Conservative win (new boundaries)				
