= Edmonton Green (ward) =

Electoral ward in London, England

- Electoral ward for the Enfield London Borough Council
- Borough: Enfield
- County: Greater London
- Population: 17,132 (2021)
- Major settlements: Edmonton Green
- Area: 2.956 km²

Current electoral ward
- Created: 2002
- Councillors: 3

Edmonton Green is an electoral ward in the London Borough of Enfield. The ward was first used in the 2002 elections and elects three councillors to Enfield London Borough Council.

== Geography ==
The ward is named after the suburb of Edmonton Green.

== Councillors ==
Election	Councillors		
2022	Abdul Abdullahi (Labour)	Gunes Akbulut (Labour)	Ergin Erbil (Labour)

== Elections ==
=== 2026 ===
Edmonton Green (3)
Party	Candidate	Votes	%	±%
Labour	Abdul Abdullahi			
Labour	Gunes Akbulut			
Conservative	Clayton Barnes			
Liberal Democrats	Julia Davenport			
Labour	Ergin Erbil			
Enfield Community Independents	Ersoy Halil			
Conservative	Rahman Hifjur			
Reform	Ruzhka Ivanova			
Liberal Democrats	Stefan Kasprzyk			
Enfield Community Independents	Sevda Kaygili			
Reform	Richard Loughlin			
Green	Claudia Mayuba			
Conservative	Paul McCannah			
Green	Shakira Ortiz			
Enfield Community Independents	Katreece Roberts			
Reform	Gokan Salim			
Liberal Democrats	Milesh Shah			
Green	Tathy Yoka Mpela			
Turnout				

=== 2022 ===
Edmonton Green (3)
Party	Candidate	Votes	%	±%
Labour	Gunes Akbulut	1,819	62.9	
Labour	Ergin Erbil	1,784	61.7	
Labour	Abdul Abdullahi	1,653	57.2	
Independent	Oktay Cinpolat	866	29.9	
Independent	Telesha Reid	648	22.4	
Conservative	Christine Williams	416	14.4	
Conservative	Andrena Smith	409	14.1	
Conservative	Phivos Joannides	360	12.4	
Green	Peter Krakowiak	330	11.4	
Liberal Democrats	Regine Lemberger	146	5.0	
Liberal Democrats	Paul Meehan	126	4.4	
Liberal Democrats	Lupita Turner	119	4.1	
Turnout			30.5	
Labour hold		Swing		
Labour hold		Swing		
Labour hold		Swing		
