= Charing Cross (ward) =

Former electoral ward in England

- Former electoral ward for the Westminster City Council
- Borough: Westminster
- County: Greater London
- Electorate: 3,695 (1974)

Former electoral ward
- Created: 1968
- Abolished: 1978
- Councillors: 2

Charing Cross was an electoral ward in the City of Westminster from 1968 to 1978. The ward was first used in the 1968 elections and last used for the 1974 elections. It returned two councillors to Westminster City Council.

== List of councillors ==
Term	Councillor	Party
1968–1971	Hugh Cubitt	Conservative
1968–1974	B. Fitzgerald-Moore	Conservative
1971–1974	R. Morcom-Harneis	Conservative
1974–1978	A. Killick	Conservative
1974–1978	R. Hargreaves	Conservative

== Westminster council elections ==
=== 1974 election ===
The election took place on 2 May 1974.

Charing Cross
Party	Candidate	Votes	%	±%
Conservative	A. Killick	498		
Conservative	R. Hargreaves	496		
Labour	T. Heath	429		
Labour	S. Smith	389		
Liberal	D. Lux	86		
Liberal	D. Copestake	83		
Independent	C. Wertheim	15		
Turnout				
Conservative hold		Swing		
Conservative hold		Swing		

=== 1971 election ===
The election took place on 13 May 1971.

Charing Cross
Party	Candidate	Votes	%	±%
Conservative	B. Fitzgerald-Moore	618		
Conservative	R. Morcom-Harneis	618		
Labour	B. Lyne	510		
Labour	M. Merriman	510		
Turnout				
Conservative hold		Swing		
Conservative hold		Swing		

=== 1968 election ===
The election took place on 9 May 1968.

1968 Westminster City Council election: Charing Cross
Party	Candidate	Votes	%	±%
Conservative	Hugh Cubitt	1,100		
Conservative	B. Fitzgerald-Moore	1,085		
Labour	J. Davies	363		
Labour	M. Brown	324		
Turnout				
Conservative win (new seat)				
Conservative win (new seat)				
