= Wilton (ward) =

- Former electoral ward for the Westminster City Council
- Wilton ward boundaries
- Borough: Westminster
- County: Greater London
- Electorate: 2,510 (1964)
- Major settlements: Belgravia

Former electoral ward
- Created: 1965
- Abolished: 1968
- Councillors: 1
- Replaced by: Knightsbridge

Wilton was an electoral ward in the City of Westminster from 1965 to 1968. The ward was first used in the 1964 elections. It returned councillors to Westminster City Council.

== Westminster council elections ==
External image
- Wilton ward boundaries

=== 1964 by-election ===
The by-election took place on 2 July 1964.

1964 Wilton by-election
Party	Candidate	Votes	%	±%
Conservative	A. Tennant	unopposed		
Conservative hold				

=== 1964 election ===
The election took place on 7 May 1964.

1964 Westminster City Council election: Wilton
Party	Candidate	Votes	%	±%
Conservative	Gordon Pirie	488		
Liberal	J. Atkinson	36		
Labour	R. Allan	22		
Turnout		548	21.8	
Conservative win (new seat)				
