= Childs Hill (ward) =

Electoral ward in the London Borough of Barnet

- Electoral ward for the Barnet London Borough Council
- Childs Hill ward boundaries since 2022
- Borough: Barnet
- County: Greater London
- Population: 19,629 (2021) (Note: 2021 Census data reported for 2022 ward boundaries)
- Electorate: 12,558 (2022)
- Major settlements: Childs Hill
- Area: 3.156 square kilometres (1.219 sq mi)

Current electoral ward
- Created: 1965
- Number of members: 3
- Councillors: Giulia Innocenti; Matthew Perlberg; Nigel Young
- GSS code: E05013631 (2022–present)

Childs Hill is an electoral ward in the London Borough of Barnet. The ward was first used in the 1964 elections. It returns councillors to Barnet London Borough Council.

== Barnet council elections since 2022 ==
There was a revision of ward boundaries in Barnet in 2022.

=== 2022 election ===
The election took place on 5 May 2022.

2022 Barnet London Borough Council election: Childs Hill
Party	Candidate	Votes	%	±%
Labour	Giulia Innocenti	2,061	45.7	
Labour	Matthew Perlberg	1,936	42.9	
Labour	Nigel Young	1,844	40.9	
Conservative	Peter Zinkin	1,746	38.7	
Conservative	Nizza Fluss	1,740	38.6	
Conservative	Adam Gheasuddin	1,497	33.2	
Liberal Democrats	Sam Cohen	627	13.9	
Liberal Democrats	Emma Rozenberg	597	13.2	
Liberal Democrats	Toby Davis	502	11.1	
Green	Karen Dolby	451	10.0	
Turnout		4,510	35.9	
Labour win (new boundaries)				
Labour win (new boundaries)				
Labour win (new boundaries)				

== 2002–2022 Barnet council elections ==
Childs Hill ward boundaries from 2002 to 2022

There was a revision of ward boundaries in Barnet in 2002.

=== 2018 election ===
The election took place on 3 May 2018.

2018 Barnet London Borough Council election: Childs Hill
Party	Candidate	Votes	%	±%
Conservative	Shimon Ryde	2,262	39.4	+6.6
Conservative	Peter Zinkin	2,243	39.0	+6.4
Labour	Anne Clarke	2,224	38.7	+7.7
Conservative	Vanessa Gearson	2,222	38.7	+5.9
Labour	Lisa Pate	2,080	36.2	+6.3
Labour	Nigel Young	1,877	32.7	+3.4
Liberal Democrats	Jack Cohen	1,279	22.3	−9.7
Liberal Democrats	Susette Palmer	1,126	19.6	−6.3
Liberal Democrats	Sachin Patel	876	15.3	−10.1
Green	Jemma Ferguson	406	7.1	−3.5
Turnout		5,744	44.7	
Conservative hold		Swing		
Conservative hold		Swing		
Labour gain from Liberal Democrats		Swing		
