= Sanderstead and Selsdon (ward) =

Former electoral ward in the London Borough of Croydon, England

- Former electoral ward for the Croydon London Borough Council
- Borough: Croydon
- County: Greater London
- Population: 15,890 (1966 estimate)
- Electorate: 11,309 (1964); 11,296 (1968); 12,451 (1971); 12,129 (1974)
- Major settlements: Selsdon
- Area: 3,334.7 acres (13.495 km^{2}) (1968)

Former electoral ward
- Created: 1965
- Abolished: 1978
- Councillors: 3

Sanderstead and Selsdon was an electoral ward in the London Borough of Croydon from 1965 to 1978. The ward was first used in the 1964 elections and last used for the 1974 elections. It returned three councillors to Croydon London Borough Council. As originally created in 1965 it included Selsdon, Farleigh and part of Sanderstead. The boundaries of the ward were adjusted in 1969. For elections to the Greater London Council, the ward was part of the Croydon electoral division from 1965 and then the Croydon South division from 1973.

== List of councillors ==
| Term | Councillor | Party |
|---|---|---|
| 1964–1974 | E. Bray | Conservative |
| 1964–1968 | M. West | Conservative |
| 1964–1978 | B. Rawling | Conservative |
| 1968–1971 | M. Davidson | Conservative |
| 1968–1978 | S. Sexton | Conservative |
| 1974–1978 | C. Aplin | Conservative |

== 1969–1974 Croydon council elections ==
The boundaries of the ward were adjusted on 1 April 1969. Farleigh was removed from the ward.

=== 1974 election ===
The election took place on 2 May 1974.

1974 Croydon London Borough Council election: Sanderstead and Selsdon
| Party | Candidate | Votes | % | ±% |
|---|---|---|---|---|
| Conservative | C. Aplin | 3,763 | | |
| Conservative | S. Sexton | 3,735 | | |
| Conservative | B. Rawling | 3,680 | | |
| Liberal | J. Coleman | 1,396 | | |
| Liberal | Michael Lane | 1,162 | | |
| Liberal | S. Paterson | 1,124 | | |
| Labour | C. Webb | 503 | | |
| Labour | G. Daisley | 490 | | |
| Labour | G. Ford | 481 | | |
| Majority | | 2,284 | | |
| Turnout | | | 46.0 | ▲4.2 |
| Registered electors | | 12,129 | | |
| Conservative hold | | Swing | | |
| Conservative hold | | Swing | | |
| Conservative hold | | Swing | | |

=== 1971 election ===
The election took place on 13 May 1971.

1971 Croydon London Borough Council election: Sanderstead and Selsdon
| Party | Candidate | Votes | % | ±% |
|---|---|---|---|---|
| Conservative | E. Bray | 3,594 | | |
| Conservative | B. Rawling | 3,559 | | |
| Conservative | S. Sexton | 3,553 | | |
| Liberal | M. Seagrave | 809 | | |
| Liberal | J. Coleman | 808 | | |
| Labour | W. Grimes | 799 | | |
| Labour | W. Leighton | 766 | | |
| Labour | E. Stallibrass | 766 | | |
| Liberal | J. Cowie | 743 | | |
| Turnout | | | 41.8 | |
| Registered electors | | 12,451 | | |
| Conservative win (new boundaries) | | | | |
| Conservative win (new boundaries) | | | | |
| Conservative win (new boundaries) | | | | |

== 1964–1969 Croydon council elections ==
External images
- Sanderstead and Selsdon ward (north), 1 April 1965
- Sanderstead and Selsdon ward (south), 1 April 1965

The ward was first used for the 1964 election to Croydon London Borough Council. It included Selsdon, Farleigh and part of Sanderstead.

=== 1968 election ===
The election took place on 9 May 1968.

1968 Croydon London Borough Council election: Sanderstead and Selsdon
| Party | Candidate | Votes | % | ±% |
|---|---|---|---|---|
| Conservative | E. Bray | 4,288 | | |
| Conservative | M. Davidson | 4,225 | | |
| Conservative | B. Rawling | 4,152 | | |
| Liberal | R. Mayhew | 1,157 | | |
| Liberal | E. Paterson | 1,150 | | |
| Liberal | R. Walters | 1,051 | | |
| Labour | M. Harding | 439 | | |
| Labour | J. Lewis | 331 | | |
| Labour | T. Wymer | 272 | | |
| Turnout | | | 51.4 | ▼5.6 |
| Registered electors | | 11,296 | | |
| Conservative hold | | Swing | | |
| Conservative hold | | Swing | | |
| Conservative hold | | Swing | | |

=== 1964 election ===
The election took place on 7 May 1964.

1964 Croydon London Borough Council election: Sanderstead and Selsdon
| Party | Candidate | Votes | % | ±% |
|---|---|---|---|---|
| Conservative | E. Bray | 3,756 | | |
| Conservative | M. West | 3,752 | | |
| Conservative | B. Rawling | 3,693 | | |
| Liberal | J. Chisholm | 2,196 | | |
| Liberal | R. Jenden | 2,089 | | |
| Liberal | A. Cooper | 2,045 | | |
| Labour | P. Crow | 468 | | |
| Labour | F. Morriss | 439 | | |
| Labour | S. Davis | 431 | | |
| Turnout | | 6,441 | 57.0 | |
| Registered electors | | 11,309 | | |
| Conservative win (new seat) | | | | |
| Conservative win (new seat) | | | | |
| Conservative win (new seat) | | | | |
