= Shirley (ward) =

- Former electoral ward for the Croydon London Borough Council
- Norbury ward boundaries from 2002 to 2018
- Borough: Croydon
- County: Greater London
- Population: 14,296 (2011)
- Electorate: 10,909 (1998)
- Major settlements: Shirley

Former electoral ward
- Created: 1965, 2002
- Abolished: 1978, 2018
- Councillors: 3
- Replaced by: 2018: Shirley North and Shirley South
- ONS code: 00AHGY (2002–2018)
- GSS code: E05000163 (2002–2018)

Shirley was an electoral ward in the London Borough of Croydon. The ward was originally created in 1965 and abolished in 1978. It was created again in 2002 and abolished in 2018. It returned three councillors to Croydon London Borough Council.

== 2002–2018 Croydon council elections ==
=== 2014 election ===
The election took place on 22 May 2014.

2014 Croydon London Borough Council election: Shirley
Party	Candidate	Votes	%	±%
Conservative	Susan Bennett	2,028		
Conservative	Richard Chatterjee	2,009		
Conservative	Mike Fisher	1,972		
Labour	Marzia Nicodemi-Ehikioya	1,301		
Labour	James Gill	1,243		
Labour	Mohamed Otmani	1,163		
UKIP	Andrew Bearchell	948		
UKIP	Eamon Connolly	870		
Green	Margaret Bebington	523		
Green	Andrew Bebington	470		
Liberal Democrats	Ronald Harris	294		
Green	Elaine Garrod	252		
Majority				
Turnout				
Conservative hold		Swing		
Conservative hold		Swing		
Conservative hold		Swing		

== 1964–1978 Croydon council elections ==
External image
- Map showing Shirley ward boundaries from 1965 to 1978

=== 1974 election ===
The election took place on 2 May 1974.

1974 Croydon London Borough Council election: Shirley
Party	Candidate	Votes	%	±%
Conservative	Peter Bowness	5,044		
Conservative	D. Perry	4,992		
Conservative	M. Horden	4,958		
Liberal	R. Lightwing	1,335		
Labour	L. Campion	1,318		
Liberal	E. Waller	1,232		
Labour	E. Stallibrass	1,216		
Liberal	S. Wallis	1,203		
Majority		3,623		
Turnout			45.4	▲5.7
Registered electors		16,824		
Conservative hold		Swing		
Conservative hold		Swing		
Conservative hold		Swing		

=== 1971 election ===
The election took place on 13 May 1971.

1971 Croydon London Borough Council election: Shirley
Party	Candidate	Votes	%	±%
Conservative	Peter Bowness	4,148		
Conservative	F. Dubery	4,112		
Conservative	M. Horden	4,036		
Labour	J. Knight	1,473		
Labour	A. Jones	1,468		
Labour	P. Knight	1,431		
Liberal	J. Hardy	557		
Liberal	R. Garrard	548		
Liberal	M. Green	518		
Turnout			39.7	▼7.7%
Registered electors		16,024		
Conservative hold		Swing		
Conservative hold		Swing		
Conservative hold		Swing		

=== 1968 election ===
The election took place on 9 May 1968.

1968 Croydon London Borough Council election: Shirley
Party	Candidate	Votes	%	±%
Conservative	R. Gilbert	4,672		
Conservative	Peter Bowness	4,655		
Conservative	R. Nash	4,609		
Liberal	C. Chance	1,023		
Liberal	A. Reeves	941		
Liberal	M. Green	875		
Labour	H. Robertson	528		
Labour	K. Kinnard	480		
Labour	W. Ulyett	466		
Turnout			47.4	▲10.1
Registered electors		13,280		
Conservative hold		Swing		
Conservative hold		Swing		
Conservative hold		Swing		

=== 1964 election ===
The election took place on 7 May 1964.

1964 Croydon London Borough Council election Shirley
Party	Candidate	Votes	%	±%
Conservative	E. Maycock	3,353		
Conservative	R. Nash	3,342		
Conservative	A. Weller	3,293		
Labour	A. Edwards	1,133		
Labour	G. Stredwick	971		
Labour	H. Robertson	960		
Independent	J. Waddell	183		
Turnout		4,475	37.3	
Registered electors		11,993		
Conservative win (new seat)				
Conservative win (new seat)				
Conservative win (new seat)				
