= East (Croydon ward) =

Historical electoral ward in London (1965–78)

- Former electoral ward for the Croydon London Borough Council
- Borough: Croydon
- County: Greater London
- Population: 16,230 (1966 estimate)
- Electorate: 11,271 (1964); 11,281 (1968); 12,667 (1971); 12,915 (1974)
- Area: 1,101.5 acres (4.458 km^{2})

Former electoral ward
- Created: 1965
- Abolished: 1978
- Councillors: 3

External image
- Map showing East ward boundaries from 1965 to 1978

East was an electoral ward in the London Borough of Croydon from 1965 to 1978. The ward was first used in the 1964 elections and last used for the 1974 elections. It returned three councillors to Croydon London Borough Council. For elections to the Greater London Council, the ward was part of the Croydon electoral division from 1965 and then the Croydon North East division from 1973.

== List of councillors ==
Term	Councillor	Party
1964–1978	William Simpson (Note: William Simpson stood as Independent in 1964, 1968 and 1971 and Conservative in 1974.)	Independent
1964–1978	William Simpson	Conservative
1964–1968	H. Styles	Independent
1964–1978	Donald Sutton (Note: Donald Sutton stood as Independent in 1964, 1968 and 1971 and Conservative in 1974.)	Independent
1964–1978	Donald Sutton	Conservative
1968–1972	H. Whitwell	Independent
1972–1978	Albert Elliott	Conservative

== Croydon council elections ==
=== 1974 election ===
The election took place on 2 May 1974.

1974 Croydon London Borough Council election: East
Party	Candidate	Votes	%	±%
Conservative	William Simpson	3,751		
Conservative	Donald Sutton	3,658		
Conservative	Albert Elliott	3,613		
Labour	E. King	1,130		
Labour	P. Norwood	1,113		
Labour	T. Reilly	1,107		
Liberal	N. Perry	643		
Liberal	P. Meek	627		
Liberal	L. Kitchener	599		
Majority		2,483		
Turnout			43.4	▲8.6
Registered electors		12,915		
Conservative gain from Independent		Swing		
Conservative gain from Independent		Swing		
Conservative hold		Swing		

=== 1972 by-election ===
The by-election took place on 6 July 1972.

1972 East by-election
Party	Candidate	Votes	%	±%
Conservative	Albert Elliott	1,709		
Labour	Alan Lord	1,578		
Independent	John Simmonds	1,221		
Turnout			34.8%	
Conservative gain from Independent		Swing		

=== 1971 election ===
The election took place on 13 May 1971.

1971 Croydon London Borough Council election: East
Party	Candidate	Votes	%	±%
Independent	William Simpson	2,895		
Independent	Donald Sutton	2,856		
Independent	H. Whitwell	2,845		
Labour	J. King	1,408		
Labour	B. Wilson	1,407		
Labour	V. Davies	1,406		
Turnout			34.8	▼2.7%
Registered electors		12,667		
Independent hold		Swing		
Independent hold		Swing		
Independent hold		Swing		

=== 1968 election ===
The election took place on 9 May 1968.

1968 Croydon London Borough Council election: East
Party	Candidate	Votes	%	±%
Independent	William Simpson	3,301		
Independent	Donald Sutton	3,264		
Independent	H. Whitwell	3,190		
Liberal	P. Lee	574		
Liberal	I. McNay	555		
Liberal	C. Mickelburgh	515		
Labour	A. Tuck	354		
Labour	K. Byrne	320		
Turnout			37.5	▼0.6
Registered electors		11,281		
Independent hold		Swing		
Independent hold		Swing		
Independent hold		Swing		

=== 1964 election ===
The election took place on 7 May 1964.

1964 Croydon London Borough Council election: East
Party	Candidate	Votes	%	±%
Independent	William Simpson	2,762		
Independent	H. Styles	2,730		
Independent	Donald Sutton	2,710		
Labour	J. Reed	962		
Labour	R. Reed	944		
Labour	P. Gibson	943		
Liberal	V. Roberts	468		
Liberal	R. Williams	468		
Liberal	P. Tapsell	462		
Turnout		4,294	38.1	
Registered electors		11,271		
Independent win (new seat)				
Independent win (new seat)				
Independent win (new seat)				
