= Central (Croydon ward) =

- Former electoral ward for the Croydon London Borough Council
- Borough: Croydon
- County: Greater London
- Population: 12,940 (1966 estimate)
- Electorate: 11,043 (1964); 10,438 (1968); 11,608 (1971); 11,632 (1974)
- Major settlements: Croydon
- Area: 1,135.7 acres (4.596 km^{2})

Former electoral ward
- Created: 1965
- Abolished: 1978
- Councillors: 3

External image
- Map showing Central ward boundaries from 1965 to 1978

Central was an electoral ward in the London Borough of Croydon from 1965 to 1978. The ward was first used in the 1964 elections and last used for the 1974 elections. It returned three councillors to Croydon London Borough Council. The ward covered central Croydon. For elections to the Greater London Council, the ward was part of the Croydon electoral division from 1965 and then the Croydon Central division from 1973. Vivian Bendall, who was a councillor for the ward throughout its existence, became MP for Ilford North in 1978.

== List of councillors ==
Term	Councillor	Party
1964–1968	John Aston	Conservative
1964–1978	Vivian Bendall	Conservative
1964–1968	A. Lawton	Conservative
1968–1978	Robert Coatman	Conservative
1968–1974	J. Haywood	Conservative
1974–1978	I. McLeod	Conservative

== Croydon council elections ==
=== 1974 election ===
The election took place on 2 May 1974.

1974 Croydon London Borough Council election: Central
Party	Candidate	Votes	%	±%
Conservative	Vivian Bendall	2,883		
Conservative	Robert Coatman	2,875		
Conservative	I. McLeod	2,845		
Labour	F. Bailey	874		
Labour	E. Hall	865		
Labour	A. Jones	831		
Liberal	M. Allan	540		
Liberal	A. Moss	511		
Liberal	J. Wheaver	483		
Majority		1,971		
Turnout			38.0	▲2.2
Registered electors		11,632		
Conservative hold		Swing		
Conservative hold		Swing		
Conservative hold		Swing		

=== 1971 election ===
The election took place on 13 May 1971.

1971 Croydon London Borough Council election: Central
Party	Candidate	Votes	%	±%
Conservative	Robert Coatman	2,882		
Conservative	Vivian Bendall	2,865		
Conservative	J. Hayward	2,863		
Labour	B. Fisher	1,156		
Labour	F. Bailey	1,150		
Labour	E. Hall	1,126		
Turnout			35.8	▲0.3%
Registered electors		11,608		
Conservative hold		Swing		
Conservative hold		Swing		
Conservative hold		Swing		

=== 1968 election ===
The election took place on 9 May 1968.

1968 Croydon London Borough Council election: Central
Party	Candidate	Votes	%	±%
Conservative	Robert Coatman	3,094		
Conservative	Vivian Bendall	3,088		
Conservative	J. Haywood	3,034		
Labour	F. Bailey	530		
Labour	E. Hall	501		
Labour	A. Packham	474		
Turnout			35.5	▼1.8
Registered electors		10,438		
Conservative hold		Swing		
Conservative hold		Swing		
Conservative hold		Swing		

=== 1964 election ===
The election took place on 7 May 1964.

1964 Croydon London Borough Council election: Central
Party	Candidate	Votes	%	±%
Conservative	John Aston	2,558		
Conservative	Vivian Bendall	2,450		
Conservative	A. Lawton	2,423		
Labour	E. Hall	1,273		
Labour	E. Sutcliffe	1,241		
Labour	H. Stopps	1,181		
Liberal	A. Sandison	315		
Liberal	H. Quemby	234		
Liberal	B. Morgan	216		
Turnout		4,116	37.3	
Registered electors		11,043		
Conservative win (new seat)				
Conservative win (new seat)				
Conservative win (new seat)				
