= Churchill (ward) =

- Former electoral ward for the Westminster City Council
- Churchill ward boundaries
- Borough: Westminster
- County: Greater London
- Electorate: 6,445 (2018)

Former electoral ward
- Created: 1965
- Abolished: 2022
- GSS code: E05000633

Churchill was an electoral ward in the City of Westminster from 1965 to 2022. The ward was first used in the 1964 elections and last used for the 2018 elections, with a by-election in 2021. It returned councillors to Westminster City Council.

== 2002–2022 Westminster council elections ==
=== 2021 by-election ===
The by-election took place on 6 May 2021, following the resignation of Andrea Mann. It was held on the same day as the 2021 London mayoral election and 2021 London Assembly election.

2021 Churchill by-election
Party	Candidate	Votes	%	±%
Labour	Liza Begum	1,340	45.6	
Conservative	Shaista Miah	1,016	34.6	
Liberal Democrats	Vikas Aggarwal	295	10.0	
Green	Zack Polanski	186	6.3	
For Britain	Andrew Cavell	99	3.4	
Majority		324	11.0	
Turnout		2,936		
Labour hold		Swing		

=== 2018 election ===
The election took place on 3 May 2018.

2018 Westminster City Council election: Churchill (3)
Party	Candidate	Votes	%	±%
Labour	Shamim Talukder	1,303	44.6	−2.0
Labour	Andrea Mann	1,281	43.9	−3.3
Conservative	Murad Gassanly	1,243	42.6	−4.6
Labour	Jason Williams	1,234	42.2	−1.4
Conservative	Shaista Miah	1,208	41.4	+0.9
Conservative	Bota Hopkinson	1,182	40.5	+1.5
Liberal Democrats	Richard Bath	223	7.6	+0.6
Liberal Democrats	Keith Dugmore	198	6.8	−0.2
Liberal Democrats	Omar Hegazi	168	5.8	N/A
Independent	Muhammad Uddin	164	5.6	−4.4
Majority		9	0.4	
Turnout		8204	45.6	+3.8
Labour hold		Swing		
Labour hold		Swing		
Conservative gain from Labour		Swing		

=== 2014 election ===
The election took place on 22 May 2014.

2014 Westminster City Council election: Churchill (3)
Party	Candidate	Votes	%	±%
Labour	Murad Gassanly	1,187	47.2	
Labour	Shamim Talukder	1,172	46.6	
Labour	Jason Williams	1,095	43.6	
Conservative	Andrew Havery	1051	41.8	
Conservative	Jacqui Wilkinson	1018	40.5	
Conservative	Alex Pierre-Traves	981	39.0	
Green	George Mackie	308	12.3	
Independent	Muhammad Uddin	251	10.0	
Liberal Democrats	David Ewen	175	7.0	
Liberal Democrats	Rhoda Torres	175	7.0	
Majority		44	1.8	
Turnout		7413	41.8	−15.0
Labour gain from Conservative		Swing		
Labour gain from Conservative		Swing		
Labour gain from Conservative		Swing		
