= Edgware (Barnet ward) =

Electoral ward in Barnet, London, England

- Electoral ward for the Barnet London Borough Council
- Borough: Barnet
- County: Greater London
- Population: 19,997 (2021)
- Major settlements: Edgware
- Area: 5.406 km²

Current electoral ward
- Created: 1965
- Councillors: 3

Edgware is an electoral ward in the London Borough of Barnet. The ward was first used in the 1964 elections. It elects three councillors to Barnet London Borough Council.

== Geography ==
The ward is named after the town of Edgware.

== Councillors ==
Election	Councillors		
2022	Lucy Wakeley (Conservative)	Nick Mearing-Smith (Conservative)	Shuey Gordon (Conservative)

== Elections ==
=== 2022 Barnet London Borough Council election ===
Edgware (3 seats)
Party	Candidate	Votes	%	±%
Conservative	Lucy Wakeley	3,110	61.3	
Conservative	Nick Mearing-Smith*	3,007	59.3	
Conservative	Shuey Gordon	2,746	54.2	
Labour	Nikhilesh Chakraborty	1,671	33.0	
Labour	Ryan Jackson	1,478	29.2	
Labour	Sorah Gluck	1,372	27.1	
Green	Dudley Miles	510	10.1	
Women's Equality	Lisa Bard	453	8.9	
Turnout		5,070	37.7	
Conservative win (new boundaries)				
Conservative win (new boundaries)				
Conservative win (new boundaries)				
