= Hans Town (ward) =

- Former electoral ward for the Kensington and Chelsea London Borough Council
- Hans Town ward boundaries from 2002 to 2014
- Borough: Kensington and Chelsea
- County: Greater London

Former electoral ward
- Created: 1965
- Abolished: 2014
- Replaced by: Brompton and Hans Town; Royal Hospital; Stanley
- ONS code: 00AWGG
- GSS code: E05000390

Hans Town was an electoral ward in the Royal Borough of Kensington and Chelsea from 1965 to 2014. The ward was first used in the 1964 election and last used for the 2010 election. It returned councillors to Kensington and Chelsea London Borough Council.

== 2002–2014 Kensington and Chelsea council elections ==
=== 2010 election ===
The election on 6 May 2010 took place on the same day as the United Kingdom general election.

2010 Kensington and Chelsea London Borough Council election: Hans Town
| Party | Candidate | Votes | % | ±% |
|---|---|---|---|---|
| Conservative | Timothy Coleridge | 1,930 | 71.6 | |
| Conservative | Nicholas Paget-Brown | 1,782 | 66.1 | |
| Conservative | Mary Weale | 1,650 | 61.2 | |
| Liberal Democrats | Josie Mayers | 399 | 14.8 | |
| Labour | Isabel Atkinson | 356 | 13.2 | |
| Labour | Paulina Emanuel | 352 | 13.1 | |
| Green | Julia Stephenson | 334 | 12.4 | |
| Liberal Democrats | Francois-Joseph-Rene Turmel | 321 | 11.9 | |
| Labour | St John Adlard | 296 | 11.0 | |
| Turnout | | 2,696 | 40.1 | |
| Conservative hold | | Swing | | |
| Conservative hold | | Swing | | |
| Conservative hold | | Swing | | |

=== 2006 election ===
The election took place on 4 May 2006.

2006 Kensington and Chelsea London Borough Council election: Hans Town
| Party | Candidate | Votes | % | ±% |
|---|---|---|---|---|
| Conservative | Timothy Coleridge | 1,352 | 87.6 | |
| Conservative | Nicholas Paget-Brown | 1,304 | | |
| Conservative | Mary Weale | 1,285 | | |
| Labour | Michael Henry | 192 | 12.4 | |
| Labour | St John Adlard | 190 | | |
| Labour | David Redvaldsen | 167 | | |
| Turnout | | 4,490 | 27.0 | −2.4 |
| Conservative hold | | Swing | | |
| Conservative hold | | Swing | | |
| Conservative hold | | Swing | | |

=== 2002 election ===
The election took place on 2 May 2002.

2002 Kensington and Chelsea London Borough Council election: Hans Town
| Party | Candidate | Votes | % | ±% |
|---|---|---|---|---|
| Conservative | Timothy Coleridge | 1,155 | | |
| Conservative | Nicholas Paget-Brown | 1,094 | | |
| Conservative | Mary Weale | 1,051 | | |
| Labour | Angela Lambert | 195 | | |
| Green | Julia Stephenson | 158 | | |
| Labour | Alexander Pringle | 146 | | |
| Labour | Natalie Pringle | 145 | | |
| Liberal Democrats | Angela Le Franc | 50 | | |
| Turnout | | 3,994 | 29.4 | |
| Conservative win (new boundaries) | | | | |
| Conservative win (new boundaries) | | | | |
| Conservative win (new boundaries) | | | | |

== 1978–2002 Kensington and Chelsea council elections ==
Hans Town ward boundaries from 1978 to 2002

=== 1998 election ===
The election on 7 May 1998 took place on the same day as the 1998 Greater London Authority referendum.

1998 Kensington and Chelsea London Borough Council election: Hans Town
| Party | Candidate | Votes | % | ±% |
|---|---|---|---|---|
| Conservative | Timothy Coleridge | 936 | 77.48 | ▲3.89 |
| Conservative | Nicholas Paget-Brown | 886 | | |
| Conservative | Mary Weale | 865 | | |
| Labour | Angela Lambert | 165 | 13.32 | ▲0.98 |
| Labour | Michael Henry | 158 | | |
| Labour | Robert Pandy | 139 | | |
| Liberal Democrats | Angela Le Franc | 114 | 9.20 | ▼4.87 |
| Liberal Democrats | Rodney Schwartz | 103 | | |
| Liberal Democrats | Guy Shanley | 102 | | |
| Registered electors | | 5,087 | | ▲891 |
| Turnout | | 1,244 | 24.45 | ▼8.20 |
| Rejected ballots | | 0 | 0.00 | Steady |
| Conservative hold | | Swing | | |
| Conservative hold | | Swing | | |
| Conservative hold | | Swing | | |

=== 1994 election ===
The election took place on 5 May 1994.

1994 Kensington and Chelsea London Borough Council election: Hans Town
| Party | Candidate | Votes | % | ±% |
|---|---|---|---|---|
| Conservative | Desmon Harney | 984 | 73.59 | ▼5.62 |
| Conservative | Nicholas Paget-Brown | 979 | | |
| Conservative | Mary Weale | 971 | | |
| Liberal Democrats | Simon Head | 198 | 14.07 | ▲6.92 |
| Liberal Democrats | Philip Gibbs | 183 | | |
| Liberal Democrats | Angela Le Franc | 179 | | |
| Labour | Michael Henry | 172 | 12.34 | ▼1.30 |
| Labour | Matilda Edelman | 169 | | |
| Labour | Janet Thatcher | 151 | | |
| Registered electors | | 4,196 | | ▼195 |
| Turnout | | 1,370 | 32.65 | ▼5.09 |
| Rejected ballots | | 0 | 0.00 | ▼0.30 |
| Conservative hold | | Swing | | |
| Conservative hold | | Swing | | |
| Conservative hold | | Swing | | |

=== 1990 election ===
The election took place on 3 May 1990.

1990 Kensington and Chelsea London Borough Council election: Hans Town
| Party | Candidate | Votes | % | ±% |
|---|---|---|---|---|
| Conservative | Mary Glyn | 1,224 | 79.21 | |
| Conservative | Nicholas Paget-Brown | 1,219 | | |
| Conservative | Desmon Harney | 1,213 | | |
| Labour | Leslie Pain | 220 | 13.64 | |
| Labour | Anthony Price | 214 | | |
| Labour | Victor Schonfield | 197 | | |
| Liberal Democrats | Thomas Drabble | 119 | 7.15 | |
| Liberal Democrats | Angela Le Franc | 116 | | |
| Liberal Democrats | Hannah Ali | 94 | | |
| Registered electors | | 4,391 | | |
| Turnout | | 1,657 | 37.74 | |
| Conservative hold | | Swing | | |
| Conservative hold | | Swing | | |
| Conservative hold | | Swing | | |

=== 1987 election ===
The by-election took place on 2 April 1987, following the death of Muriel Gumbel.

1987 Hans Town by-election
| Party | Candidate | Votes | % | ±% |
|---|---|---|---|---|
| Conservative | Mary Glyn | 1,155 | | |
| Alliance (Liberal) | Simon Head | 273 | | |
| Labour | Wesley Harcourt | 101 | | |
| Green | Penelope Shepherd | 24 | | |
| Turnout | | | | |
| Conservative hold | | Swing | | |

=== 1986 election ===
The election took place on 8 May 1986.

=== 1982 election ===
The election took place on 6 May 1982.

=== 1978 election ===
The election took place on 4 May 1978.

== 1964–1978 Kensington and Chelsea council elections ==
=== 1974 election ===
The election took place on 2 May 1974.

=== 1971 election ===
The election took place on 13 May 1971.

=== 1968 election ===
The election took place on 9 May 1968.

=== 1964 election ===
The election took place on 7 May 1964.
