= Chelsea Riverside =

Electoral ward in London, England

- Electoral ward for the Kensington and Chelsea London Borough Council
- Chelsea Riverside ward boundaries
- Borough: Kensington and Chelsea
- County: Greater London
- Population: 7,633 (2021)
- Area: 0.5491 km²

Current electoral ward
- Created: 2014
- Councillors: 3
- Created from: Cremorne, Royal Hospital
- GSS code: E05009391

Chelsea Riverside is an electoral ward in the Royal Borough of Kensington and Chelsea. The ward was first used in the 2014 elections and elects three councillors to Kensington and Chelsea London Borough Council.

== List of councillors ==
Seat	Councillor	Took office	Left office	Party	Election
1	Adrian Berrill-Cox	2014	2022	Conservative	2014, 2018
2	Maighread Condon-Simmonds	2014	2018	Conservative	2014
3	Gerard Hargreaves	2014	2026	Conservative	2014, 2018, 2022
2	Alison Jackson	2018	2022	Conservative	2018
1	Laura Burns	2022	Incumbent	Conservative	2022
2	Sonia Zvedeniuk	2022	2026	Conservative	2022
3	Heena Bellara	2026	Incumbent	Conservative	2026
2	Max Chauhan	2026	Incumbent	Conservative	2026

== Kensington and Chelsea council elections ==
=== 2026 election ===
The election took place on 7 May 2026.

=== 2022 election ===
The election took place on 5 May 2022.

2022 Kensington and Chelsea London Borough Council election: Chelsea Riverside
Party	Candidate	Votes	%	±%
Conservative	Laura Burns	1,007	46.8	−1.6
Conservative	Gerard Hargreaves	941	43.7	−3.4
Conservative	Sonia Zvedeniuk	923	42.9	−4.4
Labour	Jake Thomas	819	38.0	+1.1
Labour	Mike Coelho	805	36.7	−0.1
Labour	Cihan Cheron	722	32.9	−3.6
Liberal Democrats	Margo Schwartz	643	29.3	+19.6
Turnout			35.9	
Conservative hold		Swing		
Conservative hold		Swing		
Conservative hold		Swing		

=== 2018 election ===
The election took place on 3 May 2018.

=== 2014 election ===
The election took place on 22 May 2014.
