= Cremorne (ward) =

- Former electoral ward for the Kensington and Chelsea London Borough Council
- Cremorne ward boundaries
- Borough: Kensington and Chelsea
- County: Greater London
- Population: 7,974 (2011)
- Electorate: 5,834 (2010)

Former electoral ward
- Created: 2002
- Abolished: 2014
- Councillors: 3
- Replaced by: Chelsea Riverside
- ONS code: 00AWGD
- GSS code: E05000387

Cremorne was an electoral ward in the Royal Borough of Kensington and Chelsea from 2002 to 2014. The ward was first used in the 2002 elections and last used at a by-election in September 2010. It returned three councillors to Kensington and Chelsea London Borough Council.

== Kensington and Chelsea council elections ==
=== 2010 by-election ===
The by-election took place on 16 September 2010, following the resignation of Mark Daley.

2010 Cremorne by-election
Party	Candidate	Votes	%	±%
Conservative	Gerard Hargreaves	602	41.2	−10.2
Labour	Mabel McKeown	583	39.9	+15.6
Liberal Democrats	Peter Kosta	180	12.3	−10.8
Green	Julia Stephenson	51	3.5	N/A
UKIP	David Coburn	49	3.1	−2.1
Majority		19	1.3	
Turnout		1,462	24.9	
Conservative hold		Swing		

=== 2010 election ===
The election on 6 May 2010 took place on the same day as the United Kingdom general election.

2010 Kensington and Chelsea London Borough Council election Cremorne
Party	Candidate	Votes	%	±%
Conservative	Maighread Condon-Simmonds	1,588	52.9	
Conservative	Mark Daley	1,542	51.4	
Conservative	Matthew Neal	1,327	44.2	
Labour	Richard Briggs	730	24.3	
Labour	Lesley-Anne Arnold	728	24.3	
Liberal Democrats	Julian England	693	23.1	
Labour	Richard Chute	636	21.2	
Liberal Democrats	Elizabeth Ford	620	20.7	
Liberal Democrats	Ann Lawrence	578	19.3	
UKIP	Alasdair Seton-Marsden	155	5.2	
Turnout		3,001	51.7	
Conservative hold		Swing		
Conservative hold		Swing		
Conservative hold		Swing		

=== 2006 election ===
The election took place on 4 May 2006.

2006 Kensington and Chelsea London Borough Council election: Cremorne
Party	Candidate	Votes	%	±%
Conservative	James Cecil	1,167	59.9	
Conservative	Maighread Condon-Simmonds	1,138		
Conservative	Mark Daley	1,099		
Labour	Patricia Healy	465	23.9	
Labour	Lee Jameson	429		
Labour	Robert Mingay	391		
Liberal Democrats	Ann Lawrence	315	16.2	
Liberal Democrats	Julian England	295		
Liberal Democrats	Susan Pritchard	275		
Turnout		5,574	35.5	+1.9
Conservative hold		Swing		
Conservative hold		Swing		
Conservative hold		Swing		

=== 2002 election ===
The election took place on 2 May 2002.

2002 Kensington and Chelsea London Borough Council election: Cremorne
Party	Candidate	Votes	%	±%
Conservative	Jennifer Kingsley	823		
Conservative	Steven Redman	821		
Conservative	Maighread Simmonds	784		
Labour	Timothy Boulton	721		
Labour	Alastair Wood	689		
Labour	Mohammed Khan	636		
Liberal Democrats	Julian England	232		
Liberal Democrats	Ann Lawrence	225		
Liberal Democrats	Susan Pritchard	187		
Turnout		5,118	33.6	
Conservative win (new seat)				
Conservative win (new seat)				
Conservative win (new seat)				
