= Muriel Gumbel =

British barrister and politician

Muriel Gumbel OBE JP

Councillor on London County Council for Clapham
- In office 1955–1958

Councillor on Kensington Metropolitan Borough Council for Brompton
- In office 1959–1965

Councillor on Kensington and Chelsea London Borough Council for Brompton Hans Town (1978–1986)
- In office 1964–1986

Councillor on Greater London Council for Lambeth
- In office 1967–1970

Councillor on Greater London Council for Kensington and Chelsea
- In office 1971–1973

Councillor on Greater London Council for Sutton and Cheam
- In office 1977–1986

Member on Inner London Education Authority for Streatham
- In office 1986–1987

Personal details
- Born: Muriel Margaret Glyn; 14 November 1916
- Died: 15 February 1987 (aged 70) County Hall, London
- Party: Conservative
- Spouse: Walter Gumbel (m. 1952; died 1981)
- Children: Elizabeth-Anne; Nicky
- Education: Harrogate Ladies' College

Muriel Gumbel (née Glyn; 14 November 1916 – 15 February 1987), was a barrister and politician in London. Initially an actress, she joined the Auxiliary Territorial Service during the Second World War. Demobbed in 1946, she was called to the bar in 1949. She was a lecturer in law at London Polytechnic and a governor of Holborn Law College. In 1975, she led shareholders after the collapse of British Leyland. From 1955 until her death in 1987, she was an elected member on the London County Council, Kensington Metropolitan Borough Council, Kensington and Chelsea London Borough Council, Greater London Council and Inner London Education Authority. She was appointed an officer of the Order of the British Empire in 1985. She died in the County Hall after attending a meeting.

== Early life ==
Muriel Margaret Glyn was born in 1916. She was baptised at St James's Church, Piccadilly in Westminster. She was educated at Harrogate Ladies' College and finishing schools in Paris and Lausanne. She was an actress and worked in repertory theatre. During the Second World War, she was part of the Auxiliary Territorial Service and reached the rank of junior commander. She was demobbed in 1946.

== Political career ==
Gumbel was elected as a Conservative councillor representing Clapham at the 1955 London County Council election and lost the seat at the 1958 London County Council election. She was elected to represent Brompton ward on Kensington Metropolitan Borough Council at the elections in 1959 and 1962, unopposed in 1959 and top of the poll in 1962.

When Kensington Council was replaced by Kensington and Chelsea London Borough Council, Gumbel was elected in 1964 to the replacement Brompton ward on the new council. She was re-elected in 1968, 1971 and 1974. The number of councillors in Brompton ward was reduced from 3 to 2 from the 1978 election. Gumbel stood as a candidate in Hans Town ward and was elected in 1978 and 1982.

She was appointed Mayor of Kensington and Chelsea for the 1971/1972 municipal year. She appointed her daughter Elizabeth-Anne to serve as the mayoress.

In 1967, Gumbel was elected to the Greater London Council (GLC) to represent Lambeth. Shed lost the seat at the 1970 election. However, she was later elected at the 1971 Kensington and Chelsea by-election, taking up one of three GLC seats in Kensington and Chelsea. Representation was reduced to two single-member constituencies in 1973 and Gumbel did not stand, although she was appointed as a borough representative on the Inner London Education Authority (ILEA). In 1977 and 1981 she was elected to represent Sutton and Cheam on the GLC.

After the GLC was abolished, Gumbel was directly-elected to represent Streatham on ILEA at the only such election in 1986.

== Legal career ==
She was a barrister, called to the bar at the Middle Temple in 1949. She was a lecturer in law at London Polytechnic. In 1975, she led shareholders after the collapse of British Leyland. She was a governor of Holborn Law College.

== Personal life ==
Her father was John Glyn, a barrister and actor who died in 1938. Her brother was Alan Glyn, who was an MP. She married Walter Gumbel, a barrister she met at a court, in 1952. They lived at Ovington Square. He died in 1981. They had two children, son Nicky and daughter Elizabeth-Anne, who is also a barrister. She was appointed an officer of the Order of the British Empire for political and public service in the 1985 Birthday Honours. She died at County Hall on 15 February 1987, after attending a meeting. Her niece, Mary Glyn, was selected to stand as the Conservative candidate at the 1987 Hans Town by-election.
