= 2006 Kensington and Chelsea London Borough Council election =

2006 local election in England

2006 Kensington and Chelsea Council election
- 4 May 2006

All 54 seats to Kensington and Chelsea London Borough Council 28 seats needed for a majority
	First party	Second party
Party	Conservative	Labour
Seats won	45	9
Seat change	▲3	▼3
Popular vote	18,755	5,884
Percentage	60.4%	18.9%
Swing	▲3.1%	▼7.1%
- Map of the results of the 2006 Kensington and Chelsea Borough Council election. Conservatives in blue and Labour in red.
Council control before election
Conservative
Council control after election
Conservative

The 2006 Kensington and Chelsea Borough Council election took place on 4 May 2006 to elect members of Kensington and Chelsea London Borough Council in London, England. The whole council was up for election and the Conservative Party stayed in overall control.

== Election result ==
Kensington and Chelsea local election result 2006
Party	Seats	Gains	Losses	Net gain/loss	Seats %	Votes %	Votes	+/−
Conservative	45	3	0	▲3	83.3	60.4	18,755	▲3.1
Labour	9	0	3	▼3	16.7	18.9	5,884	▼7.1
Liberal Democrats	0	0	0	0	0.0	15.4	4,790	▼0.1
Green	0	0	0	0	0.0	4.4	1,359	▲3.2
Alliance for Green Socialism	0	0	0	0	0.0	0.7	232	New
CPA	0	0	0	0	0.0	0.1	32	New

== Ward results ==
Abingdon (3)
Party	Candidate	Votes	%	±%
Conservative	Victoria Borwick	1,249	65.6	
Conservative	James Husband	1,220		
Conservative	Joanna Gardner	1,204		
Green	George Hickman	270	14.2	
Liberal Democrats	Jeremy Good	229	12.0	
Liberal Democrats	John Faulder	211		
Labour	Margaret Delahey	156	8.2	
Labour	John Dumont	126		
Labour	Christine Robson	116		
Turnout		4,781	25.7	−1.0
Conservative hold		Swing		
Conservative hold		Swing		
Conservative hold		Swing		

Brompton (3)
Party	Candidate	Votes	%	±%
Conservative	Margot James	1,136	77.3	
Conservative	Iain Hanham	1,121		
Conservative	Shireen Ritchie	1,116		
Liberal Democrats	Stephen Kingsley	177	12.0	
Liberal Democrats	Rosamund Pease	170		
Labour	Caroline Tod	156	10.6	
Labour	Alexander Case	132		
Labour	Mark Twigg	121		
Turnout		4,129	23.8	−3.8
Conservative hold		Swing		
Conservative hold		Swing		
Conservative hold		Swing		

Campden (3)
Party	Candidate	Votes	%	±%
Conservative	Richard Ahern	1,189	58.9	
Conservative	Christopher Buckmaster	1,155		
Conservative	Robert Freeman	1,113		
Green	Dylan Banks	436	21.6	
Liberal Democrats	James Crichton-Miller	263	13.0	
Liberal Democrats	John Florentin	232		
Liberal Democrats	Brian Orrell	145		
Labour	Robert Cook	132	6.5	
Labour	Michael O'Keefe	115		
Turnout		4,780	31.4	+3.3
Conservative hold		Swing		
Conservative hold		Swing		
Conservative hold		Swing		

Colville (3)
Party	Candidate	Votes	%	±%
Labour	Dez O'Neill	703	41.4	
Labour	Marianne Alapini	663		
Labour	Keith Cunningham	625		
Liberal Democrats	Carol Caruana	511	30.1	
Liberal Democrats	Sarah Franks	431		
Liberal Democrats	Panayiotis Vardakis	373		
Conservative	Matthew Hancock	361	21.3	
Conservative	Gerard Hargreaves	352		
Conservative	Shai Hill	324		
Green	Laura Clark	122	7.2	
Green	Michael Enright	106		
Green	Hugo Charlton	75		
Turnout		4,646	31.9	+4.9
Labour hold		Swing		
Labour hold		Swing		
Labour hold		Swing		

Courtfield (3)
Party	Candidate	Votes	%	±%
Conservative	Lawrence Holt	1,025	73.6	
Conservative	Edward Cox	1,024		
Conservative	Anthony Milnes	1,008		
Liberal Democrats	Rosemary Somers	236	16.9	
Liberal Democrats	Carl Michel	206		
Liberal Democrats	William Somers	190		
Labour	Alexandra Huggins	132	9.5	
Labour	Marian Kearney	118		
Labour	Adolphe Bukasa	116		
Turnout		4,055	23.7	+0.4
Conservative hold		Swing		
Conservative hold		Swing		
Conservative hold		Swing		

Cremorne (3)
Party	Candidate	Votes	%	±%
Conservative	James Cecil	1,167	59.9	
Conservative	Maighread Condon-Simmonds	1,138		
Conservative	Mark Daley	1,099		
Labour	Patricia Healy	465	23.9	
Labour	Lee Jameson	429		
Labour	Robert Mingay	391		
Liberal Democrats	Ann Lawrence	315	16.2	
Liberal Democrats	Julian England	295		
Liberal Democrats	Susan Pritchard	275		
Turnout		5,574	35.5	+1.9
Conservative hold		Swing		
Conservative hold		Swing		
Conservative hold		Swing		

Earl's Court (3)
Party	Candidate	Votes	%	±%
Conservative	Barry Phelps	953	61.9	
Conservative	Terence Buxton	942		
Conservative	Thomas Fairhead	896		
Liberal Democrats	Linda Wade	320	20.8	
Liberal Democrats	Norma Peacock	302		
Liberal Democrats	John Drake	301		
Labour	Joel Bishop	266	17.3	
Labour	Andrew Howard	232		
Labour	Ghulam Lasharie	214		
Turnout		4,426	25.1	−2.7
Conservative hold		Swing		
Conservative hold		Swing		
Conservative hold		Swing		

Golborne (3)
Party	Candidate	Votes	%	±%
Labour	Pat Mason	784	43.2	
Labour	Bridget Hoier	742		
Labour	Emma Dent Coad	737		
Conservative	Reginald Kerr-Bell	580	32.0	
Conservative	Mark Clarke	486		
Conservative	Vaneeta Saroop	425		
Alliance for Green Socialism	Edward Adams	232	12.8	
Liberal Democrats	Frances Owen	218	12.0	
Liberal Democrats	Timothy Jones	190		
Liberal Democrats	Maria Kovatzis	153		
Turnout		4,547	29.7	+1.9
Labour hold		Swing		
Labour hold		Swing		
Labour hold		Swing		

Hans Town (3)
Party	Candidate	Votes	%	±%
Conservative	Timothy Coleridge	1,352	87.6	
Conservative	Nicholas Paget-Brown	1,304		
Conservative	Mary Weale	1,285		
Labour	Michael Henry	192	12.4	
Labour	St John Adlard	190		
Labour	David Redvaldsen	167		
Turnout		4,490	27.0	−2.4
Conservative hold		Swing		
Conservative hold		Swing		
Conservative hold		Swing		

Holland (3)
Party	Candidate	Votes	%	±%
Conservative	Joan Hanham	1,111	64.3	
Conservative	Bryan Levitt	1,099		
Conservative	Warwick Lightfoot	1,082		
Liberal Democrats	Lee Clements	239	13.8	
Green	Isaac Ferry	237	13.7	
Liberal Democrats	Christopher Elston	195		
Liberal Democrats	Benedict Knighton	183		
Labour	Violet Jameson	142	8.2	
Labour	Jonathan Heawood	128		
Labour	Margaret Pringle	126		
Turnout		4,542	27.4	−1.8
Conservative hold		Swing		
Conservative hold		Swing		
Conservative hold		Swing		

Norland (3)
Party	Candidate	Votes	%	±%
Conservative	Julie Mills	1,203	63.0	
Conservative	David Lindsay	1,192		
Conservative	Andrew Lamont	1,183		
Liberal Democrats	Helen Banner	357	18.7	
Labour	David Perry	351	18.4	
Labour	Lesley-Anne Arnold	344		
Liberal Democrats	Christopher Horner	335		
Labour	Thomas Brown	329		
Liberal Democrats	Francois Turmel	302		
Turnout		5,596	32.8	+0.5
Conservative hold		Swing		
Conservative hold		Swing		
Conservative hold		Swing		

Notting Barns (3)
Party	Candidate	Votes	%	±%
Labour	Judith Blakeman	886	43.5	
Labour	Allah Lasharie	863		
Labour	Catherine Atkinson	857		
Conservative	Quentin Marshall	783	38.4	
Conservative	Marie-Therese Rossi	761		
Conservative	Elizabeth Rutherford	734		
Liberal Democrats	Alexandra Tatton-Brown	370	18.1	
Liberal Democrats	Robin Tuck	352		
Liberal Democrats	Joe Tatton-Brown	318		
Turnout		5,973	34.0	+4.0
Labour hold		Swing		
Labour hold		Swing		
Labour hold		Swing		

Pembridge (3)
Party	Candidate	Votes	%	±%
Conservative	Isobel Campbell	917	55.1	
Conservative	David Campion	893		
Conservative	Doreen Weatherhead	830		
Green	Richard Blackwell-Whitehead	294	17.7	
Liberal Democrats	John Campbell	274	16.5	
Liberal Democrats	Patrick Mayers	208		
Liberal Democrats	Priscilla Congreve	200		
Green	Siân Berry	180		
Labour	Maria Arana	148	8.9	
Labour	Christabel Gurney	148		
Green	Derek Wall	123		
Labour	Nigel Wilkins	121		
CPA	Andrea Erdei	32		
Turnout		4,368	24.6	−2.4
Conservative hold		Swing		
Conservative hold		Swing		
Conservative hold		Swing		

Queens Gate (3)
Party	Candidate	Votes	%	±%
Conservative	Fiona Buxton	1,112	78.0	
Conservative	Daniel Moylan	1,093		
Conservative	Andrew Dalton	1,075		
Liberal Democrats	Sheila McGuirk	200	14.0	
Liberal Democrats	Niklas Ekholm	190		
Liberal Democrats	Ann Schneider-Cullen	190		
Labour	Malcolm Grant	114	8.0	
Labour	Ben Braithwaite	103		
Labour	Stephen Johnson	90		
Turnout		4,167	24.6	−1.2
Conservative hold		Swing		
Conservative hold		Swing		
Conservative hold		Swing		

Redcliffe (3)
Party	Candidate	Votes	%	±%
Conservative	Frances Taylor	1,172	73.2	
Conservative	Elizabeth Campbell	1,127		
Conservative	Charles Williams	1,096		
Liberal Democrats	Katerina Porter	249	15.6	
Liberal Democrats	Robert Woodthorpe-Browne	204		
Liberal Democrats	Juan-Pablo Raymond	193		
Labour	John Atkinson	180	11.2	
Labour	Norma Morris	178		
Labour	Anthony Price	161		
Turnout		4,560	25.0	+0.4
Conservative hold		Swing		
Conservative hold		Swing		
Conservative hold		Swing		

Royal Hospital (3)
Party	Candidate	Votes	%	±%
Conservative	John Corbet-Singleton	1,326	78.6	
Conservative	Ian Donaldson	1,323		
Conservative	Jeremey Edge	1,289		
Liberal Democrats	Penelope Pocock	243	13.6	
Liberal Democrats	Elizabeth Ford	229		
Liberal Democrats	Nan Maitland	217		
Labour	Christine Henry	131	7.8	
Labour	Richard Chute	122		
Labour	David MacFarlane	118		
Turnout		4,998	31.9	+1.0
Conservative hold		Swing		
Conservative hold		Swing		
Conservative hold		Swing		

St Charles (3)
Party	Candidate	Votes	%	±%
Conservative	Matthew Palmer	942	44.8	
Conservative	Dominic Johnson	862		
Conservative	Rock Feilding-Mellen	842		
Labour	Stephen Hoier	791	37.6	
Labour	Rima Horton	776		
Labour	John Atkinson	758		
Liberal Democrats	Ellen Kelly	370	17.6	
Liberal Democrats	Jacob Thorne	259		
Liberal Democrats	Owen Etoe	254		
Turnout		5,854	34.6	+6.2
Conservative gain from Labour		Swing		
Conservative gain from Labour		Swing		
Conservative gain from Labour		Swing		

Stanley (3)
Party	Candidate	Votes	%	±%
Conservative	Merrick Cockell	1,177	75.2	
Conservative	Priscilla Frazer	1,175		
Conservative	Paul Warrick	1,137		
Liberal Democrats	Moya Denman	233	14.9	
Liberal Democrats	George Herford	197		
Labour	Gina Coles	155	9.9	
Labour	Leslie Austin	140		
Labour	Philip Jones	123		
Turnout		4,337	30.2	+2.8
Conservative hold		Swing		
Conservative hold		Swing		
Conservative hold		Swing		
