= 2007 London Conservative Party mayoral selection =

London Conservative Party mayoral selection 2007
- 27 September 2007
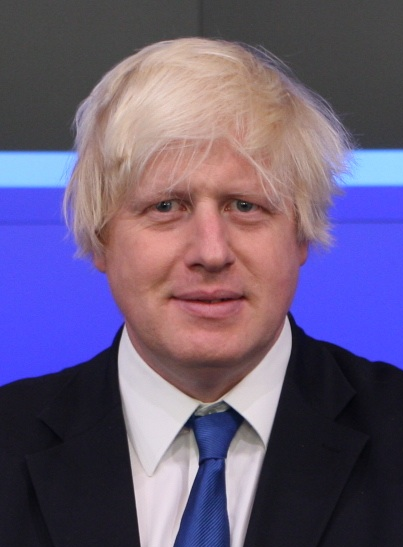

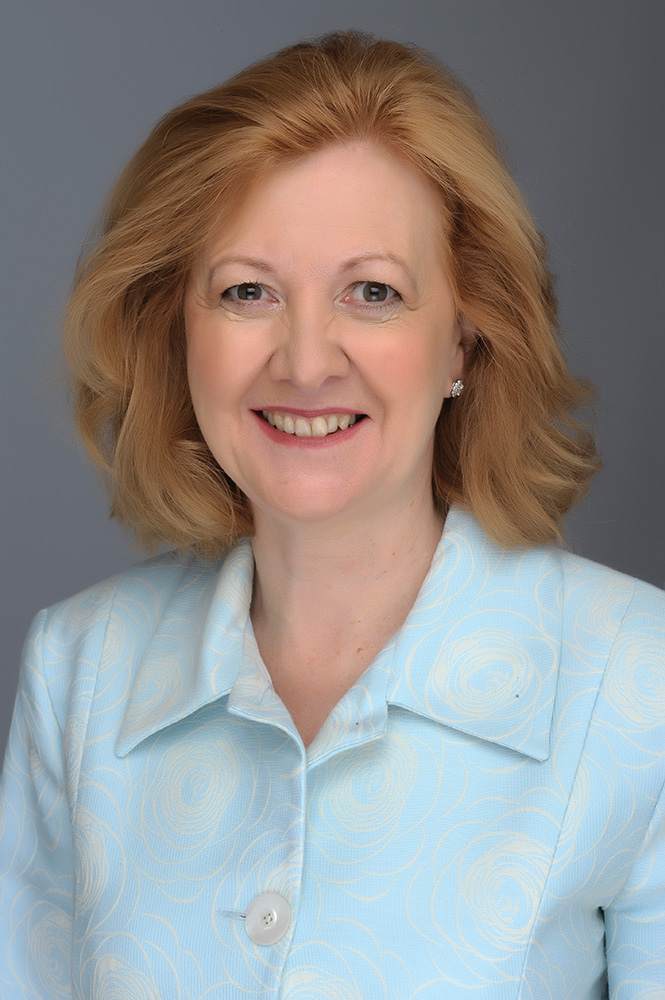

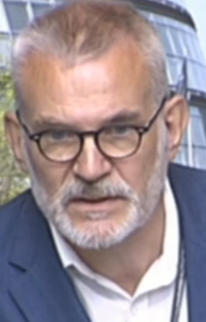
Candidate	Boris Johnson	Victoria Borwick
Popular vote	15,661	1,869
Percentage	79.0%	9.4%
Candidate	Andrew Boff	Warwick Lightfoot
Popular vote	1,674	609
Percentage	8.4%	3.1%
Elected Mayoral candidate
Boris Johnson
Conservative

The London Conservative Party mayoral selection of 2007 was the process by which the Conservative Party selected its candidate for Mayor of London, to stand in the 2008 mayoral election. Member of Parliament Boris Johnson was selected to stand.

== Selection process ==
The Mayoral candidate was selected via an Open primary that was open to all London voters who were on the electoral roll. Voters had to register to vote at a charge of £1.50.

== Candidates ==
- Boris Johnson, Member of Parliament for Henley
- Victoria Borwick, Kensington and Chelsea London Borough Councillor
- Andrew Boff, former Hillingdon and Hackney London Borough Councillor
- Warwick Lightfoot, Kensington and Chelsea London Borough Councillor

== Result ==
Candidate	Votes	%
Boris Johnson	15,661	79.0
Victoria Borwick	1,869	9.4
Andrew Boff	1,674	8.4
Warwick Lightfoot	609	3.1
Total	19,813	

== See also ==
- 2008 London mayoral election
