= Sutton and Cheam (disambiguation) =

Sutton and Cheam is a UK Parliament constituency.

Sutton and Cheam may also refer to:

- Municipal Borough of Sutton and Cheam, a former district of Surrey
- Sutton and Cheam (electoral division), Greater London Council
