= 2002 Kensington and Chelsea London Borough Council election =

2002 local election in England

Map of the results of the 2002 Kensington and Chelsea council election. Conservatives in blue and Labour in red.

The 2002 Kensington and Chelsea Borough Council election took place on 2 May 2002 to elect members of Kensington and Chelsea London Borough Council in London, England. The whole council was up for election with boundary changes since the last election in 1998. The Conservative Party stayed in overall control of the council.

== Election result ==
Kensington and Chelsea local election result 2002
Party	Seats	Gains	Losses	Net gain/loss	Seats %	Votes %	Votes	+/−
Conservative	42	3	0	+3	77.8	59.0	46,272	+6.5
Labour	12	0	3	-3	22.2	25.5	20,024	-7.4
Liberal Democrats	0	0	0	0	0.0	15.0	11,769	+0.7
Green	0	0	0	0	0.0	0.4	327	New

== Ward results ==
Abingdon (3)
Party	Candidate	Votes	%	±%
Conservative	Victoria Borwick	1,039		
Conservative	James Husband	1,020		
Conservative	Joanna Gardner	1,009		
Liberal Democrats	Jeremy Good	252		
Liberal Democrats	John Faulder	248		
Liberal Democrats	Toby Keynes	222		
Labour	Leslie Austin	207		
Labour	Ann Fitzgerald	192		
Labour	Duncan Williams	160		
Turnout		4,349	26.7	

Brompton (3)
Party	Candidate	Votes	%	±%
Conservative	David Harland	970		
Conservative	Shireen Ritchie	966		
Conservative	Iain Hanham	948		
Labour	Bernard Hamilton	192		
Liberal Democrats	Brian Orrell	177		
Liberal Democrats	Rosamund Pease	176		
Labour	David Macfarlane	166		
Labour	Dave Perry	159		
Liberal Democrats	William Somers	146		
Turnout		3,900	27.6	

Campden (3)
Party	Candidate	Votes	%	±%
Conservative	Christopher Buckmaster	1,078		
Conservative	Richard Ahern	1,059		
Conservative	Robert Freeman	1,035		
Liberal Democrats	James Crichton-Miller	243		
Liberal Democrats	Christopher Townsend	226		
Liberal Democrats	John Florentin	211		
Labour	Mary Blanchet	170		
Labour	Jacob Tompkins	151		
Labour	Ben Hooberman	134		
Turnout		4,307	28.1	

Colville (3)
Party	Candidate	Votes	%	±%
Labour	Dez O'Neill	701		
Labour	Marianne Alapini	656		
Labour	Keith Cunningham	629		
Conservative	Vaneeta Saroop	317		
Liberal Democrats	Gordon Ritchie	306		
Conservative	William Mason	305		
Liberal Democrats	Patrick Mayers	296		
Conservative	Paul Stuart-Smith	291		
Liberal Democrats	Priscilla Congreve	281		
Turnout		3,782	27.0	

Courtfield (3)
Party	Candidate	Votes	%	±%
Conservative	Anthony Coates	953		
Conservative	Lawrence Holt	906		
Conservative	Edward Cox	898		
Liberal Democrats	Rosemary Somers	230		
Liberal Democrats	Carl Michel	190		
Green	Veronica Steffen	169		
Liberal Democrats	Angele Vidal-Hall	169		
Labour	Joel Bishop	157		
Labour	Anthony Price	154		
Labour	Christabel Gurney	150		
Turnout		3,807	23.3	

Cremorne (3)
Party	Candidate	Votes	%	±%
Conservative	Jennifer Kingsley	823		
Conservative	Steven Redman	821		
Conservative	Maighread Simmonds	784		
Labour	Timothy Boulton	721		
Labour	Alastair Wood	689		
Labour	Mohammed Khan	636		
Liberal Democrats	Julian England	232		
Liberal Democrats	Ann Lawrence	225		
Liberal Democrats	Susan Pritchard	187		
Turnout		5,118	33.6	

Earl's Court (3)
Party	Candidate	Votes	%	±%
Conservative	Barry Phelps	830		
Conservative	Terence Buxton	761		
Conservative	Thomas Fairhead	743		
Labour	Rosie Brennan	543		
Labour	Gavin Bailey	455		
Labour	George Stothard	455		
Liberal Democrats	Linda Wade	406		
Liberal Democrats	Vanessa Giles	320		
Liberal Democrats	Panayiotis Vardakis	291		
Turnout		4,804	27.8	

Golborne (3)
Party	Candidate	Votes	%	±%
Labour	Bridget Hoier	874		
Labour	Patrick Mason	838		
Labour	Stuart Shapro	762		
Conservative	Sarah Dixon-Brown	308		
Conservative	Anthony Gilbert	268		
Conservative	Jeremy Larsson	241		
Liberal Democrats	Maria Kovatzis	199		
Liberal Democrats	Frances Owen	191		
Liberal Democrats	Carol Caruana	182		
Turnout		3,863	27.8	

Hans Town (3)
Party	Candidate	Votes	%	±%
Conservative	Timothy Coleridge	1,155		
Conservative	Nicholas Paget-Brown	1,094		
Conservative	Mary Weale	1,051		
Labour	Angela Lambert	195		
Green	Julia Stephenson	158		
Labour	Alexander Pringle	146		
Labour	Natalie Pringle	145		
Liberal Democrats	Angela Le Franc	50		
Turnout		3,994	29.4	

Holland (3)
Party	Candidate	Votes	%	±%
Conservative	Joan Hanham	1,109		
Conservative	Bryan Levitt	1,084		
Conservative	Warwick Lightfoot	1,064		
Liberal Democrats	Diana France	248		
Liberal Democrats	Christopher Shirley	224		
Labour	Christine Robson	213		
Liberal Democrats	Hugh Venables	213		
Labour	Gus Glover	191		
Labour	Michael O'Brien	185		
Turnout		4,531	29.2	

Norland (3)
Party	Candidate	Votes	%	±%
Conservative	David Lindsay	1,017		
Conservative	Ernest Tomlin	972		
Conservative	Brian Walker-Arnott	954		
Labour	Nicholas Gibson	467		
Labour	Lesley Arnold	432		
Labour	John Hardie	428		
Liberal Democrats	Rose Hunt	345		
Liberal Democrats	Christopher Horner	280		
Liberal Democrats	Silvia Tharp	267		
Turnout		5,162	32.3	

Notting Barns (3)
Party	Candidate	Votes	%	±%
Labour	Judith Blakeman	962		
Labour	Simon Blanchflower	948		
Labour	Allah Lasharie	850		
Conservative	Mark Clayton	436		
Conservative	Gerard Hargreaves	415		
Conservative	Amanda Sayers	404		
Liberal Democrats	Christopher Elston	239		
Liberal Democrats	Joe Tatton-Brown	230		
Liberal Democrats	Niraj Saraf	196		
Turnout		4,680	30.0	

Pembridge (3)
Party	Candidate	Votes	%	±%
Conservative	Isobel Campbell	815		
Conservative	David Campion	810		
Conservative	Doreen Weatherhead	765		
Liberal Democrats	John Campbell	362		
Labour	Virginia Henley	343		
Liberal Democrats	Patrick Spencer	309		
Liberal Democrats	Katerina Porter	298		
Labour	Robert Mingay	281		
Labour	John Wootten	240		
Turnout		4,223	27.0	

Queen's Gate (3)
Party	Candidate	Votes	%	±%
Conservative	Fiona Buxton	1,077		
Conservative	Daniel Moylan	1,047		
Conservative	Andrew Dalton	1,034		
Liberal Democrats	Edwin Brown	196		
Liberal Democrats	Sally Galsworthy	194		
Liberal Democrats	Denzil Dunnett	169		
Labour	Carolyn Butler	150		
Labour	Nigel Wilkens	127		
Labour	Malcolm Butler	121		
Turnout		4,115	25.8	

Redcliffe (3)
Party	Candidate	Votes	%	±%
Conservative	Frances Taylor	1,017		
Conservative	Nicholas Halbritter	991		
Conservative	Jonathan Clamp	988		
Labour	Thomas Brown	240		
Liberal Democrats	Anthony Dunn	230		
Liberal Democrats	Robert Woodthorpe-Brown	225		
Liberal Democrats	Christophe Lassus-Pebord	201		
Labour	Marian Kearney	187		
Labour	Brian Thorn	185		
Turnout		4,264	24.6	

Royal Hospital (3)
Party	Candidate	Votes	%	±%
Conservative	John Corbet-Singleton	1,261		
Conservative	Ian Donaldson	1,237		
Conservative	Jeremy Edge	1,216		
Liberal Democrats	Penelope Pocock	195		
Liberal Democrats	Susan Hutchison	193		
Labour	Margaret Delahey	160		
Liberal Democrats	David Royce	159		
Labour	Christine Henry	156		
Labour	Adolphe Bukasa	147		
Turnout		4,724	30.9	

St Charles (3)
Party	Candidate	Votes	%	±%
Labour	Stephen Hoier	700		
Labour	Rima Horton	662		
Labour	John Atkinson	654		
Conservative	Matthew Palmer	617		
Conservative	Dominic Johnson	562		
Conservative	David Mathew	554		
Liberal Democrats	Gisela Peters	237		
Liberal Democrats	Alexandra Tatton-Brown	214		
Liberal Democrats	Owen Etoe	177		
Turnout		4,377	28.4	

Stanley (3)
Party	Candidate	Votes	%	±%
Conservative	Priscilla Frazer	1,065		
Conservative	Merrick Cockell	1,063		
Conservative	Paul Warrick	1,025		
Labour	Catherine Atkinson	209		
Labour	Stephen King	180		
Liberal Democrats	Dorothy Patrick	178		
Liberal Democrats	John Drake	170		
Labour	Michael Henry	169		
Liberal Democrats	George Herford	164		
Turnout		4,223	27.4	
