= Ruth Shaw (politician) =

British politician (1927–2024)

Ruth Mary Shaw OBE (1927 – 31 January 2024) was a British Liberal politician.

== Life and career ==
Shaw joined the Liberal Party at an early age, and in the 1950s founded the first Young Liberals group in Sutton, London. She stood repeatedly for the party in the North West ward of the Municipal Borough of Sutton and Cheam, finally winning a seat on her seventh attempt, in 1961. When the area became part of the London Borough of Sutton, she won election to the new body, and by 1973 was the party's spokesperson on education.

Shaw stood for election in Sutton and Cheam at the 1973 Greater London Council election, winning the seat – one of only two Liberals on the council (along with Stanley Rundle). She put her victory down to "community politics" and the party's opposition to the Ringway 3 project. She was given a place on the council's Transport Committee.

At the 1977 Greater London Council election, Shaw was the party's campaign manager, but she lost her seat on the council. However, she was regularly re-elected to the borough council, and was councillor for Worcester Park North from 1986 to 1990 and North Cheam from 1990 to 2002. During her tenure, she oversaw the implementation of accessible bus services and successfully pushed to change the Planning Commission's name to Development Control. In 2011, she was named an honorary alderman of the council, and she was made an Officer of the Order of the British Empire in the 2014 New Year Honours.

Shaw died on 31 January 2024, at the age of 97.
