= Carshalton (electoral division) =

Electoral division in Greater London, 1973–1986

- Former electoral division for the Greater London Council
- Carshalton electoral division boundaries
- District: Sutton
- Electorate: 66,869 (1973); 66,850 (1977); 67,956 (1981)
- Major settlements: Carshalton
- Area: 2,575 hectares (25.75 km^{2})

Former electoral division
- Created: 1973
- Abolished: 1986
- Member: 1
- Created from: Sutton

Carshalton was an electoral division for the purposes of elections to the Greater London Council. The constituency elected one councillor for a four-year term in 1973, 1977 and 1981, with the final term extended for an extra year ahead of the abolition of the Greater London Council.

== History ==
It was planned to use the same boundaries as the Westminster Parliament constituencies for election of councillors to the Greater London Council (GLC), as had been the practice for elections to the predecessor London County Council, but those that existed in 1965 crossed the Greater London boundary. Until new constituencies could be settled, the 32 London boroughs were used as electoral areas. The London Borough of Sutton formed the Sutton electoral division. This was used for the Greater London Council elections in 1964, 1967 and 1970.

The new constituencies were settled following the Second Periodic Review of Westminster constituencies and the new electoral division matched the boundaries of the Carshalton parliamentary constituency.

It covered an area of 2,575 hectares (25.75 km^{2}).

== Elections ==
The Carshalton constituency was used for the Greater London Council elections in 1973, 1977 and 1981. One councillor was elected at each election using first-past-the-post voting.

=== 1973 election ===
The fourth election to the GLC (and first using revised boundaries) was held on 12 April 1973. The electorate was 66,869 and one Labour Party councillor was elected. The turnout was 44.8%. The councillor was elected for a three-year term. This was extended for an extra year in 1976 when the electoral cycle was switched to four-yearly.

1973 Greater London Council election: Carshalton
Party	Candidate	Votes	%	±%
Labour	Phillip John Bassett	11,611	38.77	
Conservative	George Frederick Everitt	11,239	37.54	
Liberal	C. Clark	7,094	23.69	
Turnout				
Labour win (new seat)				

=== 1977 election ===
The fifth election to the GLC (and second using revised boundaries) was held on 5 May 1977. The electorate was 66,850 and one Conservative Party councillor was elected. The turnout was 49.5%. The councillor was elected for a four-year term.

1977 Greater London Council election: Carshalton
Party	Candidate	Votes	%	±%
Conservative	Robert Gwilym Lewis-Jones	19,462	58.81	
Labour	Phillip John Bassett	9,040	27.32	
Liberal	John Hatherley	2,988	9.03	
National Front	Denis V. Horton	1,494	4.51	
GLC Abolitionist Campaign	David J Rogers	122	0.37	
Turnout				
Conservative gain from Labour		Swing		

=== 1981 election ===
The sixth and final election to the GLC (and third using revised boundaries) was held on 7 May 1981. The electorate was 67,956 and one Conservative Party councillor was elected. The turnout was 48.1%. The councillor was elected for a four-year term, extended by an extra year by the Local Government (Interim Provisions) Act 1984, ahead of the abolition of the council.

1981 Greater London Council election: Carshalton
Party	Candidate	Votes	%	±%
Conservative	Sonia Copland	14,070	43.06	
Labour	John A.S. Weir	10,548	32.28	
Liberal	Thomas Edward Dutton	7,059	21.59	
National Front	Denis V. Horton	513	1.57	
Ecology	Robert W. Steel	490	1.50	
Turnout				
Conservative hold		Swing		
