= Michael Hodgkinson =

British business man

Sir Michael Hodgkinson CBE
- Born: April 7, 1944 (age 81); London, United Kingdom
- Education: University of Nottingham
- Occupation: Businessman
- Known for: Former chief executive of Heathrow Airport Holdings from 1999 to 2003
- Spouse: Elspeth Holman (m. 1988)
- Children: 3

Sir Michael Stewart Hodgkinson (born 7 April 1944) is a British business executive who was best known for being Chief Executive of Heathrow Airport Holdings from 1999 to 2003. He has held a number of senior positions in the travel industry.

== Early life ==
The son of Stewart Gordon Hodgkinson and his wife Ruth Phyllis Pentelow, Hodgkinson was born in 1944, while his father was serving as a junior officer in the Royal Artillery. A few months later, his father transferred as a Lieutenant to the Essex Regiment.

He was educated at Hornchurch Grammar School and the University of Nottingham, graduating BA in Industrial Economics in 1965. He went on to qualify as an accountant in 1969.

== Career ==
Hodgkinson's first significant role was as managing director of Land Rover-Range Rover from 1978 to 1983. In 1986, he was appointed as Chief Executive of Grand Metropolitan’s European Food Division and in 1992 as Group Airports Director at BAA plc. He was chief executive of Heathrow Airport Holdings from 1999 to 2003, in which year he was knighted. He was next Non-Executive Chairman of Post Office Limited.

In 2007, as chairman of First Choice, Hodgkinson took it into a merger with the German company TUI, which controlled Thomson Holidays. He was elected to the supervisory board of TUI Group and became its vice-chairman, and was still serving in that position in 2016.

Hodgkinson went on to serve as Chairman of Keolis UK Ltd from December 2011 to 2019. In May 2018, the Wales & Borders franchise was awarded to KeolisAmey Wales, which received a contract valued at £5 billion covering a 15-year period starting on 14 October 2018.

Until 2013, when he was replaced by Daniel Moylan, Hodgkinson was the Transport for London nominee as a non-executive director of Crossrail.

== Personal life ==
In 1988, Hodgkinson married Elspeth Holman, the daughter of Michael Holman and Dorothy Napier, and they have a son and two daughters. They live in the St Katharine Docks area of the East End of London.
