= Advance Together =

- Founded: 2017
- Dissolved: 2020
- Headquarters: London; SW4 4EY
- Ideology: Social liberalism Subsidiarity; Reformism; Pro-Europeanism
- Political position: Centre

Website
- www.advancetogether.org.uk

Advance Together (often shortened to Advance) was a British political party. The party was led by Annabel Mullin, a former Liberal Democrat member and parliamentary candidate for Kensington. It was registered with the Electoral Commission on 22 February 2018. Party officials were named as Mullin (leader) and Peter Marshall (nominating officer). It formed an alliance with the Renew Party in late 2018, with Mullin joining the leadership team and for a time becoming leader of Renew.

== History ==
The party was founded shortly after the Grenfell Tower fire, with aims for more accountability in the council. The party contested the 2018 local elections in the Borough, winning 2.4% of the vote but failing to win any seats.

In September 2018, the party announced it was forming an alliance with the pro-European and centrist Renew Party, with Annabel Mullin joining their leadership team and serving as leader until June 2019.

The party fielded five candidates at the 2019 general election.

In December 2019, Advance received a £20,000 donation from Our Future Our Choice.

The party was voluntarily deregistered on 1 October 2020.

== Election results ==
In the 2018 local elections the party fielded 14 candidates in 12 wards in Kensington and Chelsea, receiving a total of 2,357 votes, or approximately 2.4% of the total vote.

== Elections ==
=== 2019 general election ===
Constituency	Candidate	Votes	%
Chipping Barnet	John Sheffield	71	0.1
Esher and Walton	Kyle Taylor	52	0.1
Hitchin and Harpenden	Peter Marshall	101	0.2
Mid Sussex	Brett Mortensen	47	0.1
Wokingham	Annabel Mullin	80	0.1
