= Daniel Moylan, Baron Moylan =

British politician (born 1956)

The Right Honourable The Lord Moylan Hon. FRIBA
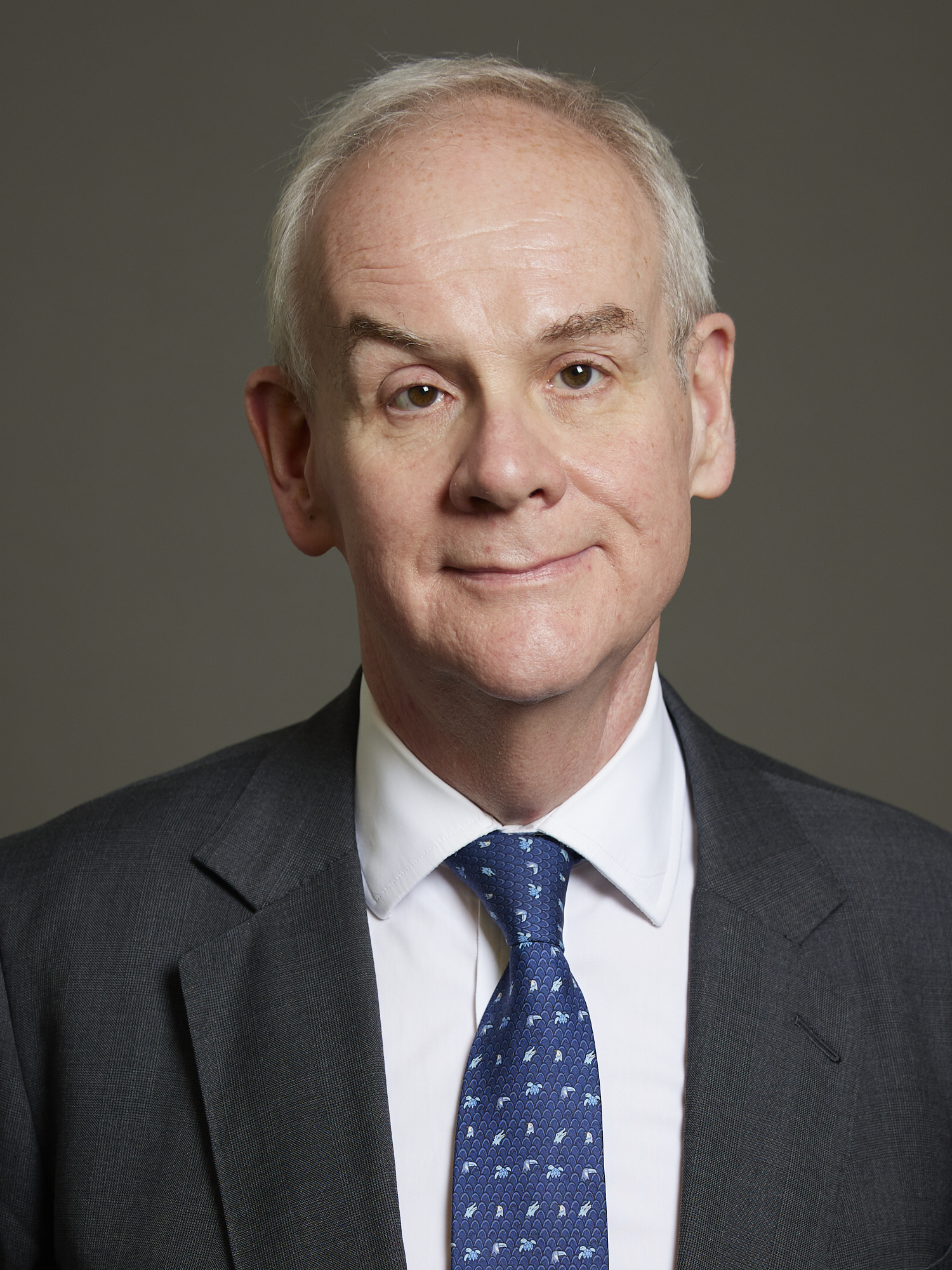
- Moylan in 2023

Member of the House of Lords
- Lord Temporal
- Life peerage 9 September 2020

Personal details
- Born: 1 March 1956 (age 70) Birmingham, England
- Party: Conservative
- Education: The Queen's College, Oxford
- Website: danielmoylan.com

Daniel Michael Gerald Moylan, Baron Moylan Hon FRIBA (born 1 March 1956) is an English Conservative politician and a member of the House of Lords.

Before being created Baron Moylan in September 2020, he had been a diplomat, a merchant banker, and a member of Kensington and Chelsea London Borough Council. He had also served as chief airport adviser to Boris Johnson as Mayor of London, advocating a new hub airport to the east of London to replace Heathrow, as Johnson's principal adviser on Crossrail 2, as Chairman of the London Legacy Development Corporation, as deputy chairman of Transport for London, and as co-chairman of Urban Design London.

In 2010, the London Evening Standard described Moylan as "one of London's most powerful and colourful politicians".

== Early life ==
Moylan was born in Birmingham on 1 March 1956. He was educated at St Philip's Grammar School, Edgbaston. In 1975 he went up to the Queen's College, Oxford, where he took a degree in German and philosophy. He was president of the Oxford Union in the Michaelmas term, 1978, and in November secured Richard Nixon as a guest speaker.

== Early career ==
Moylan joined the Foreign and Commonwealth Office in December 1978. After some time in the FCO's Central and Southern African Department, he undertook Afrikaans language training and was posted to the British Embassy in South Africa as Third Secretary, reporting on the progress of South-West Africa to independence as Namibia. In 1982, Moylan left the FCO and joined County Bank, the investment banking subsidiary of National Westminster, and stayed with them until 1986. At the general election of 1983, he stood as the Conservative candidate in Birmingham Erdington and lost to Robin Corbett by a narrow margin. In 1986, he joined Security Pacific Hoare Govett as a Vice-President and left them in 1987 to set up Egan Associates, a business providing training courses to financial institutions.

== Local government career ==
Moylan first stood for election to the Kensington and Chelsea Council at a by-election in the Golborne ward in June 1989, caused by the resignation of a rebel Labour councillor. He was elected to the council in the Queen's Gate ward in May 1990, and in 1991 made headlines when he attacked the Labour opposition for not having enough black councillors. By 1992, he was chairman of the Kensington Conservative Association. In 1996, The Westminster & Pimlico News said of him that he had "a subtle jesuitical intelligence". He became the council's deputy leader in 2000, after having stood unsuccessfully as leader. As a councillor, he specialised in environmental matters, including waste, environmental health, parks, transportation, and planning. From 2006 to 2009 he chaired the London Councils Transport and Environment Committee. In April 2011, he resigned from the Kensington and Chelsea council's cabinet in order to concentrate on his work as Deputy Chairman of Transport for London, although in 2013 when Merrick Cockell stood down he made a second bid to become leader of the council, coming equal second in the contest and losing to Nick Paget-Brown. He stood down as a Kensington and Chelsea councillor in May 2018. The 2017 Grenfell Tower fire in Kensington and Chelsea took place while Moylan was still a member of the council.

== Transport for London and Crossrail ==
In August 2008, the Mayor of London, Boris Johnson, appointed Moylan to the Board of Transport for London. In February 2009 he became deputy chairman, in which position he served until 2012 and again from March to May 2016. Moylan was responsible both for bringing the organisation's finances back into order and for terminating the public-private partnership initiated by the Blair government, brought to a close in May 2010 with TfL's acquisition of Tube Lines from Ferrovial and Bechtel.

In August 2013, Moylan was appointed to the board of Crossrail as a non-executive director, replacing Sir Mike Hodgkinson as the Transport for London nominee. In September 2014, he was appointed to oversee City Hall's work on the Crossrail 2 project. In July 2015, as the Mayor's adviser on the project, he stated that "delay should not be an option," as London was growing at the rate of two inhabitants an hour, and that by 2030 it would have a population of ten million. He remained a non-executive director of Crossrail and a member of the TfL Board, until the mayoral election in May 2016, when Sadiq Khan became Mayor.

== London infrastructure ==
Within London, Moylan has promoted new approaches to streetscape drawn principally from the Dutch "shared space" concept developed by Hans Monderman. These resulted in a redesign of Kensington High Street soon after Moylan became deputy leader of the Council in 2000. One aim of this was to rationalise street furniture and create a more pedestrian-friendly environment, and to achieve this Moylan had to reject professional advice and transfer the risks of the project onto himself and other councillors, after detailed consideration of the public safety risks. Plans for a similar improvement of Sloane Square in Chelsea proved controversial and were shelved in 2007, after a campaign against them, but a clutter-free redesign of Exhibition Road, in London's museums district, was achieved in 2012.

In 2009, Boris Johnson appointed Moylan to chair the Mayor's Design Advisory Panel, with responsibility for delivering the Mayor's vision for the public realm as set out in his "Great Outdoors" policy statement. Until he left these roles in June 2012, Moylan oversaw many improvements to highways and parks around the capital, including the restoration of Piccadilly and St James's Street to two-way traffic.

In 2011 Moylan was appointed as Chairman of the London Legacy Development Corporation, a Mayoral body created by statute to own and manage the Olympic Park, heading it for the duration of the London Summer Olympics of 2012 and the Paralympic Games. He replaced the Labour peer Lady Ford, and was formally opposed by the Labour/Green majority on the London Assembly. He made significant changes to the leadership of the organisation, which were not welcomed by the longer-serving Board members. In September 2012, Johnson himself took over as Chairman of LLDC, so that Moylan could focus on promoting their policy on a new London airport.

== Airport Service Advisor ==
Moylan was the Airport Aide to Boris Johnson as Mayor of London and worked to promote the Mayor's concept of a new or expanded multi-runway hub airport to the east of London, which would replace the existing Heathrow Airport. In May 2010, Johnson gave Moylan the responsibility for promoting this scheme. In 2010 and 2011, working with Transport for London officers and with City Hall, he oversaw the publication of a major report in two parts called A New Airport for London. In September 2012 the Government announced the establishment of an Airports Commission, chaired by Sir Howard Davies, to review options for new airport capacity. Moylan stepped down from the chairmanship of LLDC to focus on the Mayor's liaison with the new Commission. In December 2013, the Airports Commission decided against including an estuary airport option in their shortlist, concentrating instead on expansion of Heathrow or Gatwick, but agreed to reconsider the estuary option and to decide later whether to add it to the short-list. Giving evidence to the House of Commons Transport Committee, Moylan spoke of "tremendous potential for regeneration of east London" from a new hub airport in the Thames estuary. In November 2014 he was quoted as saying that creating an airport to the east of London would be "magnificently the right thing to do" and that the Heathrow site could then be developed into a new town. In October 2015, in giving evidence to the Environmental Audit Select Committee of the House of Commons, he said that an extra runway at Heathrow would cut the respite from flights allowed to local residents to as little as four hours a day.

== Later career and peerage ==
In 2018, Moylan called for an immigration policy which did not favour white Europeans. He also wanted to see the creation of a London Health Service, controlled by the Mayor of London, but with no National Health Service administrators transferring to it. He was created Baron Moylan on 9 September 2020 and on taking his seat had two hereditary peers, Lord St John of Bletso and Lord Borwick, as his supporters. He delivered his maiden speech in the House of Lords on 14 October 2020 on some new COVID-19 Regulations. Summing up his earlier life, he commented "Many people can point to a career that is a sort of linear progression, whereas mine has been more a series of happy stumbles."

Moylan was granted arms on 4 October 2021.

In July 2022, he endorsed Suella Braverman in the Conservative Party leadership election. Also in July 2022 he suggested on LBC radio that retirees should fill the UK's jobs vacancies caused by labour shortages.

Since November 2024, Moylan has served as a Shadow Transport Minister in the House of Lords.

== Personal life ==
Moylan is openly gay.

== Publications ==
- Daniel Moylan, Unripe time : Britain and the European Monetary System (Bow Group, 1988)
- Daniel Moylan, Bricks in the Wall, or, How to Build "Fortress Europe" While Denying Any Intentions of Doing So (Adam Smith Institute, 1989, ISBN 978-1870109512)

== Honorary fellowship ==
In 2008 Moylan was elected an Honorary Fellow of the Royal Institute of British Architects, which issued a press release to explain the honour.

Orders of precedence in the United Kingdom
Preceded by The Lord McLoughlin	Gentlemen; Baron Moylan	Followed by The Lord Botham
