= List of knights bachelor appointed in 2003 =

Knight Bachelor is the oldest and lowest-ranking form of knighthood in the British honours system; it is the rank granted to a man who has been knighted by the monarch but not inducted as a member of one of the organised orders of chivalry. Women are not knighted; in practice, the equivalent award for a woman is appointment as Dame Commander of the Order of the British Empire (founded in 1917).

== Knights bachelor appointed in 2003 ==
Date gazetted	Name	Notes	Ref.
20 May 2003	The Honourable Mr Justice (Michael George) Tugendhat.		
20 May 2003	The Honourable Mr Justice (Kim Martin Jordan) Lewison.		
20 May 2003	The Honourable Mr Justice (Jack) Beatson.		
14 June 2003	Kenneth Hugo Adam, OBE	For services to film production design and to UK-German relations.	
14 June 2003	Martyn Arbib, DL	For services to Charities, especially Education.	
14 June 2003	Professor John Hamilton Baker, QC	Downing Professor of the Laws of England, University of Cambridge. For services to English Legal History.	
14 June 2003	Professor Patrick Bateson, FRS	Professor of Ethology, University of Cambridge. For services to Science.	
14 June 2003	Professor Sushantha Kumar Bhattacharyya, CBE	Director, Warwick Manufacturing Group, University of Warwick. For services to Higher Education and Industry.	
14 June 2003	Ian Warwick Blair, QPM	Deputy Commissioner, Metropolitan Police Service. For services to the Police.	
14 June 2003	Kenneth Darlingston Collins	Chairman, Scottish Environment Protection Agency. For services to Environmental Protection.	
14 June 2003	Andrew Duncan Crockett	Lately Chairman, Financial Stability Forum and General Manager, Bank for International Settlements. For services to International Finance.	
14 June 2003	Michael John Austin Cummins	Serjeant-at-Arms, House of Commons	
14 June 2003	Professor Richard Henry Friend, FRS, Cavendish Professor of Physics, University of Cambridge. For services to Physics.		
14 June 2003	John Christopher Gains, Group Chief Executive, John Mowlem & Co. plc. For services to the Construction Industry.		
14 June 2003	Arthur Benjamin Norman Gill, CBE, President, National Farmers’ Union. For services to Agriculture, Conservation and the Community.		
14 June 2003	Michael Stewart Hodgkinson, Group Chief Executive, BAA plc. For services to the Air Travel Industry.		
14 June 2003	John Anthony Holland, chairman, Parades Commission for Northern Ireland.		
14 June 2003	Dr Alistair Allan Horne, CBE, Historian. For services to UK-French relations.		
14 June 2003	Peter Lampl, OBE, chairman, Sutton Trust. For services to Higher Education.		
14 June 2003	Francis Henry MacKay, chairman, Compass Group. For services to the Hospitality Industry and Charity.		
14 June 2003	Robin Robert William Miller, lately Chief Executive, EMAP. For services to Publishing and Broadcasting.		
14 June 2003	William Morris, General Secretary, Transport and General Workers Union. For services to Trade Unions.		
14 June 2003	Charles Kenneth Roylance Nunneley, lately chairman, National Trust. For services to Heritage.		
14 June 2003	Christopher John O’Donnell, Chief Executive, Smith & Nephew plc. For services to the Medical Devices Industry Worldwide.		
14 June 2003	Dr John Oldham, OBE For services to the NHS.		
14 June 2003	Christopher Ondaatje, CBE, Philanthropist and Benefactor. For charitable services to Museums, Galleries and Societies.		
14 June 2003	John Reginald Rowling, Headteacher, Nunthorpe School, Middlesbrough. For services to Education.		
14 June 2003	Dr Kenneth Robinson, Academic writer and speaker. For services to art.		
14 June 2003	Professor Edwin Mellor Southern, FRS, Whitley Professor of Biochemistry, University of Oxford. For services to the Development of DNA Microarray Technologies.		
14 June 2003	William George Taylor, Leader, Blackburn with Darwen Borough Council. For services to Local Government.		
14 June 2003	Professor John Graham Temple. For services to Medicine and Medical Education.		
14 June 2003	John Tusa, managing director, Barbican Centre. For services to the Arts.		
8 October 2003	The Honourable Mr Justice (Reginald George) Weir.		
10 October 2003	The Honourable Mr Justice (David Anthony Stewart) Richards.		
10 October 2003	The Honourable Mr Justice (David Clive) Clarke.		
10 October 2003	The Honourable Mr Justice (Richard MacLennon) Wakerley.		
31 December 2003	Richard Armstrong, CBE. Music Director, Scottish Opera. For services to Music.		
31 December 2003	Gavyn Farr Arthur, lately Lord Mayor of London. For services to the City of London.		
31 December 2003	Stuart Bell, MP, Member of Parliament for Middlesbrough. For services to Parliament.		
31 December 2003	Professor Robert David Hugh Boyd, lately Pro-Vice-Chancellor, University of London and former Principal, St George's Hospital Medical School. For services to Medicine.		
31 December 2003	Professor John Michael Brady, FRS, BP Professor of Information Engineering, University of Oxford. For services to Engineering.		
31 December 2003	Professor Alasdair Muir Breckenridge, CBE, chairman, Committee on Safety of Medicines. For services to Medicine.		
31 December 2003	John Valentine Butterfill, MP, Member of Parliament for Bournemouth West. For services to Parliament.		
31 December 2003	The Right Honourable Walter Menzies Campbell, CBE, QC, MP, Member of Parliament for North East Fife. For services to Parliament.		
31 December 2003	John Arnold Clark, chairman and Chief Executive, The Arnold Clark Organisation. For services to the Automotive Industry and to the community in Scotland.		
31 December 2003	David Cecil Clementi. For services to the Finance Industry.		
31 December 2003	Michael John Darrington, Group Managing Director, Greggs plc. For services to Business and to the community in the North-East.		
31 December 2003	Professor John Edwin Enderby, CBE, FRS, Senior Research Fellow and Emeritus Professor, University of Bristol. For services to Science and Technology.		
31 December 2003	Professor Martin John Evans, FRS, Professor of Mammalian Genetics and director, Cardiff School of Biosciences, University of Cardiff. For services to Medical Science.		
31 December 2003	Peter Oliver Gershon, CBE, Chief Executive, Office of Government Commerce.		
31 December 2003	David Edwin Hatch, CBE, JP, chairman, Parole Board for England and Wales. For services to the Criminal Justice System.		
31 December 2003	Professor Bob Alexander Hepple, QC, lately Master, Clare College, University of Cambridge. For services to Legal Studies.		
31 December 2003	Derek Alan Higgs. For services to Corporate Governance and Finance.		
31 December 2003	Dexter Walter Hutt, Head, Ninestiles Secondary School, Birmingham. For services to Education.		
31 December 2003	Simon Jenkins, Journalist. For services to Journalism.		
31 December 2003	Bernard O'Connell, Principal and Chief Executive, Runshaw College, South Ribble, Lancashire. For services to Further Education.		
31 December 2003	Gerrard Jude Robinson, chairman, Arts Council England. For services to the Arts.		
31 December 2003	Dr John Michael Taylor, OBE, FRS, Director General of Research Councils. For services to Scientific Research.		
31 December 2003	Clive Ronald Woodward, OBE. For services to Rugby Union.		
31 December 2003	Harold Matthew Evans. For services to Journalism.		
31 December 2003	Patrick Michael Leigh Fermor, DSO, OBE. For services to Literature and UK-Greek Relations.		
31 December 2003	Martin Tovadek, CMG For services to the community		
