= Sutton (electoral division) =

Electoral division in Greater London, 1965–1973

- Former electoral division for the Greater London Council
- Sutton electoral division boundaries
- District: London Borough of Sutton
- Population: 166,430 (1969 estimate)
- Electorate: 119,695 (1964); 117,721 (1967); 127,521 (1970)
- Area: 10,728.8 acres (43.418 km^{2})

Former electoral division
- Created: 1965
- Abolished: 1973
- Member(s): 2
- Replaced by: Carshalton and Sutton and Cheam

Sutton was an electoral division for the purposes of elections to the Greater London Council. The constituency elected two councillors for a three-year term in 1964, 1967 and 1970.

== History ==
It was planned to use the same boundaries as the Westminster Parliament constituencies for election of councillors to the Greater London Council (GLC), as had been the practice for elections to the predecessor London County Council, but those that existed in 1965 crossed the Greater London boundary. Until new constituencies could be settled, the 32 London boroughs were used as electoral areas which therefore created a constituency called Sutton.

The electoral division was replaced from 1973 by the single-member electoral divisions of Carshalton and Sutton and Cheam.

== Elections ==
The Sutton constituency was used for the Greater London Council elections in 1964, 1967 and 1970. Two councillors were elected at each election using first-past-the-post voting.

=== 1964 election ===
The first election was held on 9 April 1964, a year before the council came into its powers. The electorate was 119,695 and two Conservative Party councillors were elected. With 58,851 people voting, the turnout was 49.2%. The councillors were elected for a three-year term.

1964 Greater London Council election: Sutton
Party	Candidate	Votes	%	±%
Conservative	George Frederick Everitt	30,393		
Conservative	Frederick William Thompson	28,979		
Labour	P. J. Bassett	19,023		
Labour	H. Ferguson	18,129		
Liberal	J. D. Ross	7,548		
Liberal	G. R. Watkin	6,787		
Communist	A. T. Goddard	1,880		
Turnout				
Conservative win (new seat)				
Conservative win (new seat)				

=== 1967 election ===
The second election was held on 13 April 1967. The electorate was 117,721 and two Conservative Party councillors were elected. With 52,254 people voting, the turnout was 44.4%. The councillors were elected for a three-year term.

1967 Greater London Council election: Sutton
Party	Candidate	Votes	%	±%
Conservative	George Frederick Everitt	30,899		
Conservative	Alan Horace Lewis Leach	29,879		
Labour	P. J. Bassett	13,894		
Labour	C. J. Goodall	12,869		
Liberal	J. H. G. Browne	6,341		
Liberal	R. H. Insoll	5,470		
Communist	F. Clark	1,251		
Turnout				
Conservative hold		Swing		
Conservative hold		Swing		

=== 1970 election ===
The third election was held on 9 April 1970. The electorate was 127,521 and two Conservative Party councillors were elected. With 44,774 people voting, the turnout was 35.1%. The councillors were elected for a three-year term.

1970 Greater London Council election: Sutton
Party	Candidate	Votes	%	±%
Conservative	George Frederick Everitt	28,062		
Conservative	Alan Horace Lewis Leach	27,573		
Labour	P. J. Bassett	12,664		
Labour	H. Ferguson	12,171		
Liberal	R. H. Insoll	2,657		
Liberal	Graham Norman Tope	2,523		
Homes before Roads	R. B. Cook	600		
Communist	H. A. Cleverley	503		
Homes before Roads	D. G. Rennie	474		
Union Movement	A. H. Burn	310		
Turnout				
Conservative hold		Swing		
Conservative hold		Swing		
