= Duncan Williams (newspaper executive) =

British publisher

Duncan Williams is a British publisher involved in regional news and sport media. Williams has been described as a media entrepreneur by members of the newspaper industry. He bought a portfolio of hyper-local newspapers during a period of industry transition, where long established titles were closing down and often selling at rock bottom prices. As rapid readership migrations from print to digital took hold, Williams maintained that "the real value investment is in the brand".

However, critics insisted that his controversial acquisition of View From Newspapers, as well as the historic Pulman's Weekly News series had resulted in significant local job losses. As Director of Capital Media Newspapers, he helped steer early investment in newsroom AI technology, supporting the development of regional news platforms such as the Dorset Gazette.

Williams is also known for his work within the faith publishing sector, where he was involved in the surprise post-Leveson success of a Christian themed magazine named Sorted gaining a foothold within the mainstream and highly competitive lads' mag marketplace. For many years he has continued to provide niche content and news reports for ChristianToday.com and Good News papers.

Additionally, Sport Newspapers were acquired by Williams, who had invested in their development from exclusively print based titles to "real time" digital brands, with an expanded reach gained from social media and online news syndication.

During an earlier career in print journalism, Duncan Williams always stated that he was a lifelong Labour Party supporter. He had once stood as a Labour Party candidate for Abingdon Ward during the 2002 local council elections, held within the Royal Borough of Kensington & Chelsea. Throughout a gruelling 3 year long Employment Tribunal case and Tribunal Appeal process, initially brought against him by 31 fellow journalists and newspaper employees, Williams maintained he sympathised with all the claimants because he himself was still "a trade union member".
