= 2018 Kensington and Chelsea London Borough Council election =

2018 Kensington and Chelsea Borough Council election
- 3 May 2018

All 50 seats to Kensington and Chelsea London Borough Council 26 seats needed for a majority

	First party	Second party	Third party
Party	Conservative	Labour	Liberal Democrats
Last election	37 seats, 57.8%	12 seats, 28.7%	1 seat, 8.6%
Seats won	36	13	1
Seat change	▼1	▲1	0
Popular vote	51,106	32,816	12,321
Percentage	51.4%	33.0%	12.4%
Swing	▼6.4%	▲4.3%	▲3.8%
- Results of the 2018 Kensington and Chelsea London Borough council election. Conservatives in blue, Labour in red and Liberal Democrats in yellow.
Council control before election
Conservative
Council control after election
Conservative

The 2018 Kensington and Chelsea London Borough Council election took place on 3 May 2018 to elect members of Kensington and Chelsea London Borough Council in England. The election was held on the same day as other local elections in England. While Kensington and Chelsea is usually regarded as a Conservative stronghold, there was media speculation that Labour could win control of the council in the wake of the Grenfell Tower fire. However the Conservatives maintained control, losing just one Councillor, in St. Helen's Ward, winning 36 seats to Labour's 13.

== Overall results ==
Council composition after the election.

Kensington and Chelsea London Borough Council election 2018
Party	Seats	Gains	Losses	Net gain/loss	Seats %	Votes %	Votes	+/−
Conservative	36	0	1	-1	72.0	47.6	18,960	-4.2
Labour	13	1	0	+1	26.0	31.8	12,662	+4.4
Liberal Democrats	1	0	0	±0	2.0	13.8	5,479	+2.2
Advance	0	0	0	0	0.0	5.0	1,979	New
Green	0	0	0	0	0.0	1.1	446	-2.2
UKIP	0	0	0	0	0.0	0.5	185	-0.7
Independent	0	0	0	0	0.0	0.1	58	-4.5
Democrats and Veterans	0	0	0	0	0.0	0.1	27	New

== Ward results ==
=== Abingdon ===
Abingdon (3)
Party	Candidate	Votes	%	±%
Conservative	Sarah Addenbrooke	1,389	66.2	−6.8
Conservative	Anne Cyron	1,309	62.4	−6.1
Conservative	James Husband*	1,296	61.7	−6.6
Labour	Manju Gregory	368	17.5	+2.7
Labour	Sharda Rozena	356	17.0	+3.0
Liberal Democrats	Ciara Brown	338	16.1	N/A
Labour	Stuart Shapro	318	15.2	+3.9
Liberal Democrats	Jeremy Good	307	14.6	+4.3
Liberal Democrats	Jonathan Owen	299	14.2	+4.9
Advance	Britta Scupin Rogers	101	4.8	N/A
Turnout				
Conservative hold		Swing		
Conservative hold		Swing		
Conservative hold		Swing		

=== Brompton and Hans Town ===
Brompton and Hans Town (3)
Party	Candidate	Votes	%	±%
Conservative	Walaa Idris	1,342	70.5	−7.5
Conservative	Mary Weale*	1,324	69.6	+0.7
Conservative	Sophia McVeigh	1,322	69.5	−1.3
Labour	David Kear	290	15.2	+0.9
Labour	John Morley	286	15.0	+1.0
Labour	Marian Skeen	279	14.7	+1.8
Liberal Democrats	Moya Denman	233	12.2	+2.9
Liberal Democrats	George Herford	163	8.6	N/A
Liberal Democrats	Robert Woodthorpe-Browne	157	8.3	N/A
UKIP	Elizabeth De Stanford Wallitt	72	3.8	N/A
Turnout				
Conservative hold		Swing		
Conservative hold		Swing		
Conservative hold		Swing		

=== Campden ===
Campden (3)
Party	Candidate	Votes	%	±%
Conservative	Catherine Faulks*	1,483	63.5	−8.4
Conservative	Robert Freeman*	1,481	63.4	−6.0
Conservative	Ian Wason	1,398	59.8	−15.5
Liberal Democrats	Priscilla Congreve	352	15.1	−0.4
Labour	Tabatha Batra Vaughan	345	14.8	−1.9
Labour	Frank Kovacs	309	13.2	+1.6
Labour	Ian Trewin	304	13.0	+2.5
Liberal Democrats	Tim Walker	304	13.0	N/A
Advance	Sonia Mihelic	289	12.4	N/A
Liberal Democrats	Richard Burnett-Hall	260	11.1	N/A
Advance	Peter Marshall	213	9.1	N/A
Turnout				
Conservative hold		Swing		
Conservative hold		Swing		
Conservative hold		Swing		

=== Chelsea Riverside ===
Chelsea Riverside (3)
Party	Candidate	Votes	%	±%
Conservative	Adrian Berrill-Cox	1,196	48.4	−7.2
Conservative	Alison Jackson	1,170	47.3	−7.8
Conservative	Gerard Hargreaves	1,164	47.1	−3.7
Labour	Lorna Sherlock	911	36.9	+5.9
Labour	Kasim Ali	909	36.8	+5.7
Labour	Sofiane Saidoune	903	36.5	+7.3
Liberal Democrats	Panayiotis Vardakis	240	9.7	±0.0
Liberal Democrats	Josie Mayers	204	8.3	±0.0
Advance	Eryl Humphrey Jones	188	7.6	N/A
UKIP	Richard Braine	62	2.5	N/A
UKIP	Sophie Braine	62	2.5	N/A
UKIP	Alasdair Seton-Marsden	51	2.1	N/A
Turnout				
Conservative hold		Swing		
Conservative hold		Swing		
Conservative hold		Swing		

=== Colville ===
Colville (3)
Party	Candidate	Votes	%	±%
Labour	Monica Press*	1,269	54.7	+15.0
Labour	Nadia Nail	1,200	51.7	+12.2
Labour	Ian Henderson	1,170	50.4	+15.9
Conservative	Christopher Knight	645	27.8	+3.7
Conservative	Carole Noble	588	25.3	+1.3
Conservative	Chris Spring	557	24.0	+0.6
Liberal Democrats	Nicola Kerr	287	12.4	−12.4
Liberal Democrats	Susanna Chenery	268	11.6	−5.4
Liberal Democrats	Nigel Warrack	220	9.5	−0.5
Advance	Nadia Boujjettef	206	8.9	N/A
Advance	Claire Van Helfteren	165	7.1	N/A
Turnout				
Labour hold		Swing		
Labour hold		Swing		
Labour hold		Swing		

=== Courtfield ===
Courtfield (3)
Party	Candidate	Votes	%	±%
Conservative	Janet Evans	1,373	69.0	−2.0
Conservative	Greg Hammond	1,354	68.1	+1.9
Conservative	Quentin Marshall*	1,325	66.6	+1.0
Liberal Democrats	Charlie Goodman	283	14.2	+1.9
Labour	Rene Gimpel	252	12.7	−3.4
Liberal Democrats	Norma Peacock	252	12.7	−1.6
Liberal Democrats	Tim Verboven	242	12.2	N/A
Labour	Luke Francis	233	11.7	−2.6
Labour	Angharad Monk	212	10.7	−3.0
Advance	Amir Tayebi	127	6.4	N/A
Independent	Kyle Farren	58	2.9	N/A
Turnout				
Conservative hold		Swing		
Conservative hold		Swing		
Conservative hold		Swing		

=== Dalgarno ===
Dalgarno (2)
Party	Candidate	Votes	%	±%
Labour	Pat Healy*	1,258	73.7	+11.2
Labour	Robert Thompson*	1,119	65.5	+13.4
Conservative	Marina Palmer	393	23.0	+2.5
Conservative	Dougal Steward	315	18.4	+1.4
Liberal Democrats	Jacqueline Taylor	137	8.0	+1.3
Turnout				
Labour hold		Swing		
Labour hold		Swing		

=== Earl’s Court ===
Earl’s Court (3)
Party	Candidate	Votes	%	±%
Liberal Democrats	Linda Wade*	1,073	45.3	+5.1
Conservative	Malcolm Spalding*	913	38.6	−5.7
Conservative	Hamish Adourian	764	32.3	−12.1
Conservative	Lloyd North	756	31.9	−7.2
Labour	Samantha Batra	610	25.8	+7.4
Liberal Democrats	Harry Baden-Powell	609	25.7	+5.6
Labour	Bruno Diantantou	598	25.3	+10.7
Liberal Democrats	Carmel McLoughlin	568	24.0	+4.3
Labour	Danny Sweeney	483	20.4	+6.1
Green	Erwin Schaefer	223	9.4	−6.0
UKIP	Callum Dorrington Hutton	51	2.2	N/A
UKIP	Mike Jones	20	0.8	N/A
Turnout				
Liberal Democrats hold		Swing		
Conservative hold		Swing		
Conservative hold		Swing		

=== Golborne ===
Golborne (3)
Party	Candidate	Votes	%	±%
Labour	Emma Dent Coad*	1,585	77.5	+8.0
Labour	Pat Mason*	1,503	73.5	+4.4
Labour	Sina Lari	1,409	68.9	+6.8
Conservative	Will Mumby	288	14.1	−0.4
Conservative	Georgina Stewart	267	13.0	−0.7
Conservative	David Mytton	243	11.9	−1.5
Liberal Democrats	Frances Owen	161	7.9	+1.4
Liberal Democrats	Andre Petrolo	125	6.1	N/A
Liberal Democrats	Rosemary Somers	109	5.3	+1.5
Turnout				
Labour hold		Swing		
Labour hold		Swing		
Labour hold		Swing		

=== Holland ===
Holland (3)
Party	Candidate	Votes	%	±%
Conservative	Aarien Areti	1,203	52.8	−15.1
Conservative	Charles O'Connor	1,191	52.3	−10.3
Conservative	Johnny Thalassites	1,142	50.1	−12.0
Labour	Lorna Kelly	760	33.4	+11.1
Labour	Roberto Stasi	727	31.9	+11.6
Labour	Nathaniel McBride	685	30.1	+10.3
Liberal Democrats	Dominque Lambert	304	13.3	−1.4
Liberal Democrats	Hugh Lalor	253	11.1	−3.5
Advance	Deepali Nangia	208	9.1	N/A
Turnout				
Conservative hold		Swing		
Conservative hold		Swing		
Conservative hold		Swing		

=== Norland ===
Norland (2)
Party	Candidate	Votes	%	±%
Conservative	David Lindsay*	1,151	58.8	−7.6
Conservative	Julie Mills*	1,126	57.5	−9.9
Labour	Mona Adam	467	23.8	+1.7
Labour	Jan Sweeney	433	22.1	+1.0
Liberal Democrats	Vivienne Shirley	234	11.9	+1.6
Liberal Democrats	Blanche Girouard	204	10.4	+1.2
Advance	Valerie John-Baptiste	176	9.0	N/A
Turnout				
Conservative hold		Swing		
Conservative hold		Swing		

=== Notting Dale ===
Notting Dale (3)
Party	Candidate	Votes	%	±%
Labour	Judith Blakeman*	1,658	72.3	+2.2
Labour	Robert Atkinson*	1,562	68.1	+1.4
Labour	Marwan Elnaghi	1,544	67.3	+3.9
Conservative	Clarissa Agnew	397	17.3	−7.3
Conservative	Daniel Lewis	387	16.9	−5.0
Conservative	Cordelia Evans	373	16.3	−4.6
Liberal Democrats	Lucy Chenery	211	9.2	N/A
Advance	Melvyn Akins	171	7.5	N/A
Liberal Democrats	William Somers	116	5.1	N/A
Turnout				
Labour hold		Swing		
Labour hold		Swing		
Labour hold		Swing		

=== Pembridge ===
Pembridge (2)
Party	Candidate	Votes	%	±%
Conservative	Laura Round	822	53.7	−10.9
Conservative	Dori Schmetterling	777	50.8	−9.3
Labour	Annabelle Giles Louvros	438	28.6	+5.9
Labour	Henry Peterson	381	24.9	+5.3
Liberal Democrats	Tom Fox	257	16.8	+2.0
Liberal Democrats	Andrew Lomas	196	12.8	+2.4
Advance	Ritika Handa	123	8.0	N/A
Turnout				
Conservative hold		Swing		
Conservative hold		Swing		

=== Queen’s Gate ===
In May 2019, Palmer was expelled from the Conservatives, he now sits as an Independent.

Queen’s Gate (3)
Party	Candidate	Votes	%	±%
Conservative	Max Chauhan	1,126	67.7	−7.6
Conservative	Matthew Palmer*	1,110	66.7	−1.5
Conservative	Max Woodger	1,105	66.4	−6.9
Liberal Democrats	Jill Manasseh	297	17.9	+4.9
Liberal Democrats	Sheila McGuirk	278	16.7	+5.0
Liberal Democrats	Noel McNamara	243	14.6	N/A
Labour	Carmen Callil	235	14.1	+1.1
Labour	Emma Southby	224	13.5	+2.2
Labour	Soonu Engineer	210	12.6	+2.5
Democrats and Veterans	Ralph Hancock	27	1.6	N/A
Turnout				
Conservative hold		Swing		
Conservative hold		Swing		
Conservative hold		Swing		

=== Redcliffe ===
Redcliffe (3)
Party	Candidate	Votes	%	±%
Conservative	Tom Bennett	1,317	62.4	−3.2
Conservative	Marie-Therese Rossi*	1,282	60.8	−3.6
Conservative	Charles Williams*	1,195	56.6	−4.6
Labour	Isabel Atkinson	411	19.5	+2.0
Labour	Meg McDonald	348	16.5	+2.3
Labour	Mike Vessey	346	16.4	+3.5
Liberal Democrats	Katerina Porter	324	15.4	+5.4
Liberal Democrats	Virginia Morck	319	15.1	+4.6
Liberal Democrats	Barbara Woodthorpe-Browne	272	12.9	N/A
Advance	Theo Goodliffe	173	8.2	N/A
Turnout				
Conservative hold		Swing		
Conservative hold		Swing		
Conservative hold		Swing		

=== Royal Hospital ===
Royal Hospital (3)
Party	Candidate	Votes	%	±%
Conservative	Elizabeth Campbell*	1,907	74.8	−0.5
Conservative	Emma Will*	1,817	71.3	−1.3
Conservative	Cem Kemahli	1,779	69.8	+1.4
Labour	Michael O'Brien	349	13.7	+1.3
Labour	Mary Gardiner	346	13.6	+2.6
Labour	Marian Kearney	338	13.3	+8.3
Liberal Democrats	Penny Pocock	291	11.4	+2.8
Liberal Democrats	Margo Schwartz	246	9.7	+2.8
Liberal Democrats	Alexander Nowak	241	9.5	N/A
Advance	Mark Sautter	80	3.1	N/A
Turnout				
Conservative hold		Swing		
Conservative hold		Swing		
Conservative hold		Swing		

=== St Helen’s ===
St Helen’s (2)
Party	Candidate	Votes	%	±%
Labour	Mohammed Bakhtiar*	924	52.5	+7.4
Labour	Portia Thaxter	867	49.3	+7.1
Conservative	Eve Allison*	592	33.7	−11.4
Conservative	Miloud Bouhaddou	527	30.0	−11.0
Liberal Democrats	Alexandra Tatton-Brown	244	13.9	+3.5
Liberal Democrats	Toby McMillan	187	10.6	+4.0
Turnout				
Labour hold		Swing		
Labour gain from Conservative		Swing		

=== Stanley ===
Stanley (3)
Party	Candidate	Votes	%	±%
Conservative	Josh Rendall	1,423	60.9	−1.0
Conservative	Kim Taylor-Smith	1,407	60.2	+1.4
Conservative	Will Pascall*	1,400	59.9	+0.7
Labour	Lorrain Motileb	532	22.8	+8.9
Labour	Richard Chute	507	21.7	+8.6
Labour	Mark Motileb	500	21.4	+9.5
Green	Heinz Schumi	223	9.5	−9.3
Liberal Democrats	Carl Michel	213	9.1	N/A
Liberal Democrats	Vincent Lowe	200	8.6	N/A
Liberal Democrats	Guy Mayers	179	7.7	N/A
Advance	Jennifer Eastwood	137	5.9	N/A
Turnout				
Conservative hold		Swing		
Conservative hold		Swing		
Conservative hold		Swing		

Heinz Schumi stood as an Independent candidate in 2014.

== By-Elections ==
Dalgarno by-election, 21 March 2019
Party	Candidate	Votes	%	±%
Labour	Kasim Ali	719	55.4	−15.0
Conservative	Samia Bentayeb	306	23.6	+1.6
Liberal Democrats	Alexandra Tatton-Brown	145	11.2	+3.5
UKIP	Callum Hutton	68	5.2	+5.2
Green	Angela Georgievski	61	4.7	+4.7
Majority		413	31.8	
Turnout		1,299		
Labour hold		Swing		

The by-election was called following the resignation of Cllr Robert Thompson.
