= 2014 Kensington and Chelsea London Borough Council election =

2014 Kensington and Chelsea Borough Council election
- 22 May 2014

All 50 seats to Kensington and Chelsea London Borough Council

| | First party | Second party | Third party |
|---|---|---|---|
| Party | Conservative | Labour | Liberal Democrats |
| Leader's seat | 0 |
| Last election | 0 seats, 0% | 0 seats, 0% | 1 seat, 0% |
| Seats won | 37 | 12 | 1 |
| Seat change | ▼6 | ▲3 | Steady |
| Popular vote | 47,991 | 23,845 | 7,154 |
| Percentage | 51.8% | 27.4% | 11.6% |
| Swing | ▼ | ▲ | ▲ |
- Results of the 2014 Kensington and Chelsea London Borough council election. Conservatives in blue and Labour in red.
Council control before election
Conservative
Council control after election
Conservative

Map of the results of the 2014 Kensington and Chelsea council election. Conservatives in blue, Labour in red and Liberal Democrats in yellow.

Elections for Kensington and Chelsea London Borough Council were held on 22 May 2014. The United Kingdom element of the 2014 European Parliament election and other local elections took place on the same day.

In London council elections the entire council is elected every four years, opposed to some local elections where one councillor is elected every year for three of the four years.

== Results ==
Royal Borough of Kensington and Chelsea election result 2014
| Party | Seats | Gains | Losses | Net gain/loss | Seats % | Votes % | Votes | +/− |
|---|---|---|---|---|---|---|---|---|
| Conservative | 37 | | | -6 | 74.0 | 51.8 | 17,623 | +0.1 |
| Labour | 12 | | | +3 | 24.0 | 27.4 | 9,321 | +5.4 |
| Liberal Democrats | 1 | | | -1 | 2.0 | 11.6 | 3,942 | -10.0 |
| Independent | 0 | | | 0 | 0.0 | 4.6 | 1,557 | +3.3 |
| Green | 0 | | | 0 | 0.0 | 3.3 | 1,133 | -0.6 |
| UKIP | 0 | | | 0 | 0.0 | 1.2 | 421 | +0.7 |

== Reduction in size of council ==
The Local Government Boundary Commission for England released its final recommendations for changes to the Royal Borough in September 2013, reducing the size of the council to 50 members.

== Ward results ==
| Ward | Votes | Cllrs | Votes | Cllrs | Votes | Cllrs | Votes | Cllrs | Votes | Cllrs | Total Votes | Total Cllrs |
| Ward | Conservative | | Labour | | Lib Dem | | Green | | Others | | Total Votes | Total Cllrs |
|---|---|---|---|---|---|---|---|---|---|---|---|---|
| Abingdon | 3682 | 3 | 704 | 0 | 344 | 0 | 236 | 0 | | | 4966 | 3 |
| Brompton and Hans Town | 3503 | 3 | 603 | 0 | 150 | 0 | | | 147 | 0 | 4403 | 3 |
| Campden | 3933 | 3 | 704 | 0 | 281 | 0 | | | | | 4918 | 3 |
| Chelsea Riverside | 3491 | 3 | 1950 | 0 | 389 | 0 | | | 188 | 0 | 6018 | 3 |
| Colville | 1502 | 0 | 2388 | 3 | 1089 | 0 | 310 | 0 | 455 | 0 | 5744 | 3 |
| Courtfield | 3393 | 3 | 740 | 0 | 446 | 0 | | | | | 4579 | 3 |
| Dalgarno | 586 | 0 | 1791 | 2 | 196 | 0 | | | 253 | 0 | 2826 | 2 |
| Earl's Court | 2714 | 2 | 1004 | 0 | 1279 | 1 | 327 | 0 | | | 5324 | 3 |
| Golborne | 736 | 0 | 3551 | 3 | 182 | 0 | | | 117 | 0 | 4586 | 3 |
| Holland | 2965 | 3 | 961 | 0 | 452 | 0 | | | | | 4378 | 3 |
| Norland | 1970 | 2 | 636 | 0 | 287 | 0 | | | | | 2893 | 2 |
| Notting Dale | 1391 | 0 | 4132 | 3 | | | | | | | 5523 | 3 |
| Pembridge | 1517 | 2 | 515 | 0 | 306 | 0 | | | | | 2338 | 2 |
| Queen's Gate | 3233 | 3 | 345 | 0 | 369 | 0 | | | | | 3947 | 3 |
| Redcliffe | 3482 | 3 | 577 | 0 | 375 | 0 | | | 168 | 0 | 4602 | 3 |
| Royal Hospital | 4659 | 3 | 611 | 0 | 333 | 0 | | | 164 | 0 | 5767 | 3 |
| St Helen's | 1306 | 1 | 1323 | 1 | 258 | 0 | | | | | 2887 | 2 |
| Stanley | 3928 | 3 | 848 | 0 | | | | | 1376 | 0 | 6152 | 3 |
| Total | 47,991 | 37 | 23,845 | 12 | 7,154 | 1 | 1,133 | 0 | 2,868 | 0 | 81851 | 50 |

=== Abingdon ===
Abingdon (3)
| Party | Candidate | Votes | % | ±% |
|---|---|---|---|---|
| Conservative | Victoria Borwick | 1,281 | 73.0 | |
| Conservative | Joanna Gardner | 1,202 | 68.5 | |
| Conservative | James Husband | 1,199 | 68.3 | |
| Labour | Anne Corbett | 260 | 14.8 | |
| Labour | Tina Alkaff | 245 | 14.0 | |
| Green | Enrique Juan Alcocer | 236 | 13.4 | |
| Labour | William Stirling | 199 | 11.3 | |
| Liberal Democrats | Jeremy Good | 181 | 10.3 | |
| Liberal Democrats | Jonathan Owen | 163 | 9.3 | |
| Turnout | | 1,755 | 30.2 | |

=== Brompton and Hans Town ===
Brompton and Hans Town (3)
| Party | Candidate | Votes | % | ±% |
|---|---|---|---|---|
| Conservative | Timothy Coleridge | 1,255 | 78.0 | |
| Conservative | Nicholas Paget-Brown | 1,139 | 70.8 | |
| Conservative | Mary Weale | 1,109 | 68.9 | |
| Labour | Philip Hall | 230 | 14.3 | |
| Labour | St John Adlard | 226 | 14.0 | |
| Labour | Sofiane Saidoune | 207 | 12.9 | |
| Liberal Democrats | Moya Denman | 150 | 9.3 | |
| Independent | Iain Smith | 147 | 9.1 | |
| Turnout | | 1,609 | 24.3 | |

=== Campden ===
Campden (3)
| Party | Candidate | Votes | % | ±% |
|---|---|---|---|---|
| Conservative | Tim Ahern | 1,367 | 75.3 | |
| Conservative | Catherine Faulks | 1,305 | 71.9 | |
| Conservative | Robert Freeman | 1,261 | 69.4 | |
| Labour | Andrew Moran | 303 | 16.7 | |
| Liberal Democrats | Priscilla Congreve | 281 | 15.5 | |
| Labour | Michael O’Brien | 210 | 11.6 | |
| Labour | Besart Zhubi | 191 | 10.5 | |
| Turnout | | 1,816 | 30.3 | |

=== Chelsea Riverside ===
Chelsea Riverside (3)
| Party | Candidate | Votes | % | ±% |
|---|---|---|---|---|
| Conservative | Adrian Berrill-Cox | 1,202 | 55.6 | |
| Conservative | Maighread Condon-Simmonds | 1,191 | 55.1 | |
| Conservative | Gerard Hargreaves | 1,098 | 50.8 | |
| Labour | Richard Briggs | 670 | 31.0 | |
| Labour | Robert Cameron | 650 | 30.1 | |
| Labour | Molly Faulkner | 630 | 29.2 | |
| Liberal Democrats | Mary Harris | 210 | 9.7 | |
| Independent | Alistair Marsden | 188 | 8.7 | |
| Liberal Democrats | John Drake | 179 | 8.3 | |
| Turnout | | 2,160 | 34.5 | |

=== Colville ===
Colville (3)
| Party | Candidate | Votes | % | ±% |
|---|---|---|---|---|
| Labour | Monica Press | 834 | 39.7 | |
| Labour | Harrison Littler | 830 | 39.5 | |
| Labour | Andrew Lomas | 724 | 34.5 | |
| Liberal Democrats | Carol Caruana | 520 | 24.8 | |
| Conservative | Tiffany Bourgoin-Heskia | 506 | 24.1 | |
| Conservative | Lloyd North | 504 | 24.0 | |
| Conservative | Maxwell Woodger Bacon | 492 | 23.4 | |
| Independent | Dez O’Neill | 455 | 21.7 | |
| Liberal Democrats | Tim Jones | 358 | 17.0 | |
| Green | Derek Wall | 310 | 14.8 | |
| Liberal Democrats | Peter Kosta | 211 | 10.0 | |
| Turnout | | 2,100 | 32.0 | |

=== Courtfield ===
Courtfield (3)
| Party | Candidate | Votes | % | ±% |
|---|---|---|---|---|
| Conservative | Anthony Coates | 1,188 | 71.0 | |
| Conservative | Elizabeth Rutherford | 1,108 | 66.2 | |
| Conservative | Quentin Marshall | 1,097 | 65.6 | |
| Labour | Lesley-Anne Arnold | 270 | 16.1 | |
| Labour | Norma Morris | 240 | 14.3 | |
| Liberal Democrats | Norma Peacock | 240 | 14.3 | |
| Labour | Christabel Gurney | 230 | 13.7 | |
| Liberal Democrats | William Somers | 206 | 12.3 | |
| Turnout | | 1,700 | 24.8 | |

=== Dalgarno ===
Dalgarno (2)
| Party | Candidate | Votes | % | ±% |
|---|---|---|---|---|
| Labour | Pat Healy | 977 | 62.5 | |
| Labour | Robert Thompson | 814 | 52.1 | |
| Conservative | Sarah Addenbrooke | 320 | 20.5 | |
| Conservative | Ned Donovan | 266 | 17.0 | |
| UKIP | Mike Jones | 253 | 16.2 | |
| Liberal Democrats | Josephine Mayers | 105 | 6.7 | |
| Liberal Democrats | Joe Tatton-Brown | 91 | 5.8 | |
| Turnout | | 1,563 | 34.1 | |

=== Earl’s Court ===
Earl’s Court (3)
| Party | Candidate | Votes | % | ±% |
|---|---|---|---|---|
| Conservative | Fenella Aoane | 942 | 44.4 | |
| Conservative | Malcolm Spalding | 941 | 44.3 | |
| Liberal Democrats | Linda Wade | 853 | 40.2 | |
| Conservative | Jonathon Read | 831 | 39.1 | |
| Liberal Democrats | Clive Benson | 426 | 20.1 | |
| Liberal Democrats | Sheila McGuirk | 418 | 19.7 | |
| Labour | Joel Bishop | 390 | 18.4 | |
| Green | Lucilla Butler | 327 | 15.4 | |
| Labour | David Kear | 311 | 14.6 | |
| Labour | Junaed Khan | 303 | 14.3 | |
| Turnout | | 2,123 | 31.8 | |

=== Golborne ===
Golborne (3)
| Party | Candidate | Votes | % | ±% |
|---|---|---|---|---|
| Labour | Emma Dent Coad | 1,229 | 69.5 | |
| Labour | Pat Mason | 1,223 | 69.1 | |
| Labour | Bevan Powell | 1,099 | 62.1 | |
| Green | Benjamin Parker | 260 | 14.7 | |
| Conservative | Jeremy Edge | 256 | 14.5 | |
| Conservative | Melanie Panzone | 243 | 13.7 | |
| Conservative | Max Chauhan | 237 | 13.4 | |
| Independent | Thee Montgomerie-Anderson | 117 | 6.6 | |
| Liberal Democrats | Frances Owen | 115 | 6.5 | |
| Liberal Democrats | Rosemary Somers | 67 | 3.8 | |
| Turnout | | 28.8 | 1,769 | |

=== Holland ===
Holland (3)
| Party | Candidate | Votes | % | ±% |
|---|---|---|---|---|
| Conservative | Deborah Collinson | 1,045 | 67.9 | |
| Conservative | Warwick Lightfoot | 964 | 62.6 | |
| Conservative | Rock Feilding-Mellen | 956 | 62.1 | |
| Labour | Ben Hooberman | 343 | 22.3 | |
| Labour | Paul Quinn | 313 | 20.3 | |
| Labour | Stuart Shapro | 305 | 19.8 | |
| Liberal Democrats | Oliver Campion-Awwad | 227 | 14.7 | |
| Liberal Democrats | Bill Keeling | 225 | 14.6 | |
| Turnout | | 1,539 | 28.4 | |

=== Norland ===
Norland (2)
| Party | Candidate | Votes | % | ±% |
|---|---|---|---|---|
| Conservative | Julie Mills | 992 | 67.4 | |
| Conservative | David Lindsay | 978 | 66.4 | |
| Labour | Roger Bowerman | 326 | 22.1 | |
| Labour | Deirdre O’Day | 310 | 21.1 | |
| Liberal Democrats | Francois Turmel | 151 | 10.3 | |
| Liberal Democrats | Dora Pease | 136 | 9.2 | |
| Turnout | | 1,472 | 35.9 | |

=== Notting Dale ===
Notting Dale (3)
| Party | Candidate | Votes | % | ±% |
|---|---|---|---|---|
| Labour | Judith Blakeman | 1,446 | 70.1 | |
| Labour | Robert Atkinson | 1,377 | 66.7 | |
| Labour | Beini Lasharie | 1,309 | 63.4 | |
| Conservative | Nicholas Bell | 507 | 24.6 | |
| Conservative | Sarah Ducker | 453 | 21.9 | |
| Conservative | Sasi Kumar | 431 | 20.9 | |
| Turnout | | 2,064 | 34.4 | |

=== Pembridge ===
Pembridge (2)
| Party | Candidate | Votes | % | ±% |
|---|---|---|---|---|
| Conservative | Barbara Campbell | 786 | 64.6 | |
| Conservative | David Campion | 731 | 60.1 | |
| Labour | Christine Robson | 276 | 22.7 | |
| Labour | Caroline Tod | 239 | 19.6 | |
| Liberal Democrats | Ann Coxon | 180 | 14.8 | |
| Liberal Democrats | Thomas Sherman | 126 | 10.4 | |
| Turnout | | 1,217 | 27.4 | |

=== Queen’s Gate ===
Queen’s Gate (3)
| Party | Candidate | Votes | % | ±% |
|---|---|---|---|---|
| Conservative | Sam Mackover | 1,123 | 75.3 | |
| Conservative | Daniel Moylan | 1,093 | 73.3 | |
| Conservative | Matthew Palmer | 1,017 | 68.2 | |
| Labour | Annabelle Louvros | 194 | 13.0 | |
| Liberal Democrats | Philippa Manasseh | 194 | 13.0 | |
| Liberal Democrats | Barry Brown | 175 | 11.7 | |
| Labour | Soonu Engineer | 168 | 11.3 | |
| Labour | Bob Mingay | 151 | 10.1 | |
| Turnout | | 1,492 | 25.8 | |

=== Redcliffe ===
Redcliffe (3)
| Party | Candidate | Votes | % | ±% |
|---|---|---|---|---|
| Conservative | David Nicholls | 1,195 | 65.6 | |
| Conservative | Marie-Therese Rossi | 1,173 | 64.4 | |
| Conservative | Charles Williams | 1,114 | 61.2 | |
| Labour | Anne Campbell | 318 | 17.5 | |
| Labour | Margaret Pringle | 259 | 14.2 | |
| Labour | Saker Nusseibeh | 234 | 12.9 | |
| Liberal Democrats | Virginia Morck | 192 | 10.5 | |
| Liberal Democrats | Katerina Porter | 183 | 10.0 | |
| UKIP | Janus Polenceusz | 168 | 9.2 | |
| Turnout | | 1,821 | 27.2 | |

=== Royal Hospital ===
Royal Hospital (3)
| Party | Candidate | Votes | % | ±% |
|---|---|---|---|---|
| Conservative | Elizabeth Campbell | 1,622 | 75.3 | |
| Conservative | Emma Will | 1,564 | 72.6 | |
| Conservative | Andrew Rinker | 1,473 | 68.4 | |
| Labour | Richard Chute | 268 | 12.4 | |
| Labour | Marwan Elnaghi | 236 | 11.0 | |
| Liberal Democrats | Penny Pocock | 185 | 8.6 | |
| Independent | Ev Hesketh | 164 | 7.6 | |
| Liberal Democrats | George Herford | 148 | 6.9 | |
| Labour | Isabel Atkinson | 107 | 5.0 | |
| Turnout | | 2,155 | 31.1 | |

=== St Helen’s ===
St Helen’s (2)
| Party | Candidate | Votes | % | ±% |
|---|---|---|---|---|
| Conservative | Eve Allison | 684 | 45.1 | |
| Labour | Mohammed Bakhtiar | 683 | 45.1 | |
| Labour | Nigel Wilkins | 640 | 42.2 | |
| Conservative | Ian Hargreaves | 622 | 41.0 | |
| Liberal Democrats | Alexandra Tatton-Brown | 158 | 10.4 | |
| Liberal Democrats | Patrick Mayers | 100 | 6.6 | |
| Turnout | | 1,516 | 34.2 | |

=== Stanley ===
Stanley (3)
| Party | Candidate | Votes | % | ±% |
|---|---|---|---|---|
| Conservative | Merrick Cockell | 1,352 | 61.9 | |
| Conservative | Will Pascall | 1,292 | 59.2 | |
| Conservative | Paul Warrick | 1,284 | 58.8 | |
| Independent | Andrew Barshall | 486 | 22.3 | |
| Independent | Ian Henderson | 479 | 21.9 | |
| Independent | Heinz Schumi | 411 | 18.8 | |
| Labour | Luke Francis | 304 | 13.9 | |
| Labour | Gregory Warren | 285 | 13.1 | |
| Labour | Benjamin Wheatley | 259 | 11.9 | |
| Turnout | | 2,183 | 33.0 | |

== By-Elections ==
=== 2014-2018 ===
Stanley by-election, 7 May 2015
| Party | Candidate | Votes | % | ±% |
|---|---|---|---|---|
| Conservative | Kim Taylor-Smith | 2,349 | 69.4 | +7.5 |
| Labour | Isabel Grace | 693 | 20.5 | +6.6 |
| Independent | Ian Henderson | 343 | 10.1 | −11.8 |
| Majority | | 1,656 | 48.9 | |
| Turnout | | 3,385 | 52.3 | |
| Conservative hold | | Swing | | |

The by-election was called following the resignation of Cllr Merrick Cockell.

Abingdon by-election, 5 May 2016 (2 seats)
| Party | Candidate | Votes | % | ±% |
|---|---|---|---|---|
| Conservative | Sarah Addenbrooke | 1,716 | | |
| Conservative | Anne Cyron | 1,470 | | |
| Labour | Benjamin Fernando | 395 | | |
| Labour | Nigel Wilkins | 298 | | |
| Liberal Democrats | Jeremy Good | 220 | | |
| Liberal Democrats | Jonathan Owen | 210 | | |
| UKIP | Richard Braine | 85 | | |
| UKIP | Jack Bovill | 76 | | |
| Majority | | 1,075 | | |
| Turnout | | | 46.4 | |
| Conservative hold | | Swing | | |
| Conservative hold | | Swing | | |

The by-election was called following the resignations of Cllrs Victoria Borwick MP and Joanna Gardner.
