= 1962 London local elections =

Local elections in England

- 10 May 1962

All 1,336 councillors in all 28 metropolitan boroughs
	First party	Second party
Party	Labour	Conservative
Councils	21	7
Councils +/–	▲3	▼3
Councillors	923	393
Councillors +/–	▲70	▼86

Local elections were held in London on 10 May 1962.

== Electoral arrangements ==
The County of London, outside of the City of London, was divided into 28 metropolitan boroughs. Each borough was divided into a number of multi-member electoral wards.

Councillors were elected to serve a three year term, to go out of office in 1965. Prior to this, elections to the shadow London borough councils were held on 7 May 1964.

== Results ==
The Conservatives lost control of three councils, Lewisham, (Note: The Conservatives won a majority of councillors in 1959. However, Labour had retained control of Lewisham council, following the election of the mayor and aldermen.) St Pancras and Wandsworth, to Labour.

The results for each borough were as follows:

Borough	Previous control	New control	Labour	Conservative	Liberal	Others	Total	Details
Battersea	Labour	Labour	40	12	3		55	
Bermondsey	Labour	Labour	45				45	Details
Bethnal Green	Labour	Labour	30				30	
Camberwell	Labour	Labour	48	12			60	
Chelsea	Conservative	Conservative	6	30			36	
Deptford	Labour	Labour	33	3			36	
Finsbury	Labour	Labour	32	2			34	
Fulham	Labour	Labour	33	7			40	
Greenwich	Labour	Labour	29	6			35	
Hackney	Labour	Labour	48				48	
Hammersmith	Labour	Labour	33	6			39	
Hampstead	Conservative	Conservative	12	27	3		42	
Holborn	Conservative	Conservative	8	34			42	
Islington	Labour	Labour	58			2 (Note: 2 Independent Labour.)	60	
Kensington	Conservative	Conservative	18	42			60	
Lambeth	Labour	Labour	47	13			60	
Lewisham	Conservative	Labour	29	26			55	
Paddington	Conservative	Conservative	23	37			60	
Poplar	Labour	Labour	39			3 (Note: 3 Residents association.)	42	
Shoreditch	Labour	Labour	33				33	
Southwark	Labour	Labour	60				60	Details
Stepney	Labour	Labour	35		2	3 (Note: 3 Communist.)	40	
St Marylebone	Conservative	Conservative	10	50			60	
Stoke Newington	Labour	Labour	26		4		30	
St Pancras	Conservative	Labour	50	10			60	
Wandsworth	Conservative	Labour	36	24			60	
Westminster	Conservative	Conservative	17	43			60	
Woolwich	Labour	Labour	45	9			54	
Total			923	393	12	8	1,336	
