= Sutton and Cheam (electoral division) =

Electoral division in Greater London, 1973–1986

- Former electoral division for the Greater London Council
- District: Sutton
- Electorate: 60,475 (1973); 61,850 (1977); 62,729 (1981)
- Area: 1,765 hectares (17.65 km^{2})

Former electoral division
- Created: 1973
- Abolished: 1986
- Member: 1
- Created from: Sutton

Sutton and Cheam was an electoral division for the purposes of elections to the Greater London Council. The constituency elected one councillor for a four-year term in 1973, 1977 and 1981, with the final term extended for an extra year ahead of the abolition of the Greater London Council.

== History ==
It was planned to use the same boundaries as the Westminster Parliament constituencies for election of councillors to the Greater London Council (GLC), as had been the practice for elections to the predecessor London County Council, but those that existed in 1965 crossed the Greater London boundary. Until new constituencies could be settled, the 32 London boroughs were used as electoral areas. The London Borough of Sutton formed the Sutton electoral division. This was used for the Greater London Council elections in 1964, 1967 and 1970.

The new constituencies were settled following the Second Periodic Review of Westminster constituencies and the new electoral division matched the boundaries of the Sutton and Cheam parliamentary constituency.

It covered an area of 1,765 hectares (17.65 km^{2}).

== Elections ==
The Sutton and Cheam constituency was used for the Greater London Council elections in 1973, 1977 and 1981. One councillor was elected at each election using first-past-the-post voting.

=== 1973 election ===
The fourth election to the GLC (and first using revised boundaries) was held on 12 April 1973. The electorate was 60,475 and one Liberal Party councillor was elected. The turnout was 48.1%. The councillor was elected for a three-year term. This was extended for an extra year in 1976 when the electoral cycle was switched to four-yearly.

1973 Greater London Council election: Sutton and Cheam
Party	Candidate	Votes	%	±%
Liberal	Ruth Mary Shaw	15,515	53.35	
Conservative	Alan Horace Lewis Leach	10,367	35.63	
Labour	Peter L Spalding	3,209	11.03	
Turnout				
Liberal win (new seat)				

=== 1977 election ===
The fifth election to the GLC (and second using revised boundaries) was held on 5 May 1977. The electorate was 61,850 and one Conservative Party councillor was elected. The turnout was 55.9%. The councillor was elected for a four-year term.

1977 Greater London Council election: Sutton and Cheam
Party	Candidate	Votes	%	±%
Conservative	Muriel Gumbel	19,921	57.60	
Liberal	Ruth Mary Shaw	11,145	32.21	
Labour	John K Evers	2,657	7.68	
National Front	John E Hunt	871	2.52	
Turnout				
Conservative gain from Liberal		Swing		

=== 1981 election ===
The sixth and final election to the GLC (and third using revised boundaries) was held on 7 May 1981. The electorate was 62,729 and one Conservative Party councillor was elected. The turnout was 54.5%. The councillor was elected for a four-year term, extended by an extra year by the Local Government (Interim Provisions) Act 1984, ahead of the abolition of the council.

1981 Greater London Council election: Sutton and Cheam
Party	Candidate	Votes	%	±%
Conservative	Muriel Gumbel	15,666	45.82	
Liberal	Elizabeth M. Sharp	14,665	42.88	
Labour	Philip J. Bassett	3,555	10.39	
Ecology	Jonathan P. Vickery	312	0.91	
Turnout				
Conservative hold		Swing		
