= Warwick Lightfoot =

British politician

Warwick Martin Lightfoot (born 1957) is a British Conservative politician, economist, and former political adviser. He has been a councillor in the Royal Borough of Kensington and Chelsea since 1986, and has stood for numerous other positions, including Member of Parliament, Member of the European Parliament and Mayor of the London Borough of Kensington and Chelsea.

Lightfoot attended the University of Oxford, where he was active in the Oxford Union, becoming President. After graduating, Lightfoot became an economist. He served as a special adviser to the Secretary of State for Employment, Norman Fowler, and to three Chancellors – Nigel Lawson, John Major, and Norman Lamont. He then worked for the Royal Bank of Scotland.

Lightfoot was first elected to Kensington and Chelsea London Borough Council at the 1986 election. He has been the Cabinet Member for Finance and IT since 2009. He was previously the Cabinet Member for Community Safety (2006–2009) and for Social Services and Health (2001–2003). He ran for Parliament in Liverpool Mossley Hill in 1987 – finishing third – and South East Cornwall in 1997– losing the seat to the Liberal Democrats.
