= Nicholas Paget-Brown =

English Conservative politician

Nicholas Paget-Brown is an English Conservative Party politician who was leader of the Kensington and Chelsea London Borough Council. He was first elected as a councillor in 1986. He became Leader of the Council on 23 May 2013. On 30 June 2017, he announced that he would step down as leader following government criticism of the Council's response to the Grenfell Tower fire, and was replaced as leader on 19 July 2017.

== Early life ==
Paget-Brown was born in March 1957. He was educated at Cranleigh School and at the University of York.

== Career ==
Paget-Brown worked for a small start-up company in the City of London providing the UK’s first online research service (Textline) for financial institutions. The company (Finsbury Data Services) was acquired by Reuters in 1985. He then became an international marketing manager for Reuters. In 1991 he was recruited to set-up a London office for Knight Ridder Information (Dialog). He subsequently launched UK Environment News, a corporate newsletter providing early warning of changes to UK and European Union environment and energy policies and the impact of these on business. He has subsequently undertaken consultancy work on public policy.

== Political activity ==
Paget-Brown was elected as a councillor for the Hans Town ward in the 1986 Kensington and Chelsea London Borough Council election.

He stood as the Conservative candidate for the Don Valley constituency in the 1992 United Kingdom general election. He became chairman of Kensington and Chelsea Conservative Association in 1997 and led the Association through the 1999 Kensington and Chelsea by-election which followed the death of Alan Clark and saw Michael Portillo elected. In 2000 he was appointed chief whip to the Conservative Group on the Council and served for 11 years before becoming Deputy Leader in May 2011.

== Kensington and Chelsea Council ==
Paget-Brown had a number of responsibilities within the Cabinet of Kensington and Chelsea Council.

=== Environment ===
Paget-Brown signed the Council up to the Carbon Trust’s Local Authority Carbon Management Programme and oversaw the installation of the Borough’s first on-street electric charging points.

He was responsible for the extensive refurbishment of Avondale Park, Kensington Memorial Park and Little Wormwood Scrubs as part of a ten year programme of capital investment in the Borough’s parks.

He established the Market Streets Action Group to support regeneration of the Portobello and Golborne Road Markets. In 2007 he was responsible for establishing the North Kensington Environment Project. This supported cleaning up neglected sites including bridges and utility installations and establishing community kitchen gardens, initially in North Kensington and then across the Borough. It expanded to cover the whole Borough in 2011.

In 2012 he was appointed by Boris Johnson, Mayor of London, to the London Waste and Recycling Board (LWARB).

=== Transport ===
Paget-Brown led the delivery of the Exhibition Road refurbishment scheme, creating a shared space using tactile delineation to assist the visually impaired whilst also providing greater accessibility to those with mobility problems.

He was responsible for overseeing the extensive renovation of the Albert Bridge ahead of the 2012 Olympics.

=== Arts ===
Paget-Brown was supportive of Opera Holland Park, a Council initiative, over many years. In 2015 when it was restructured as an independent charitable organisation, he oversaw the appointment of Charles Mackay to chair the new Opera Holland Park Trust.

He was a champion of the Cultural Placemaking initiative which was started as part of the Council's Arts and Culture Policy in 2009. The plan was to develop a broader coherent strategy to encourage developers to consider the council's creative and artistic ambitions when working on a development project.

He ensured Council funding and support for the 3-phased restoration and extension of Leighton House.

Paget-Brown supported the establishment of the Nour Arts Festival in 2010 celebrating Middle Eastern and North African art and culture.

Following a public consultation in 2006, he was instrumental in persuading the Council to provide long-term financial support to the Tabernacle in Powis Square W11 as a community arts centre with strong links to Notting Hill Carnival. It re-opened after a lengthy period of closure in 2008.

He launched the Portobello Art Wall to provide a backdrop for artists to reflect the neighbourhood around Portobello and Golborne markets.

From 2002-2013 he served as a Trustee of the al-Manaar mosque and Muslim Cultural Heritage Centre near Ladbroke Grove.

=== Leader of the Council ===
Paget-Brown was Leader from 2013 and 2017. During this time the Council sought to protect front-line services from the effect of cuts to government funding to local authorities by participating in the tri-Borough initiative to share senior staff with neighbouring boroughs Hammersmith and Fulham and Westminster. A new Leisure Centre and Academy were opened in North Kensington. Plans for a replacement library in North Kensington and regeneration of several Council housing estates were also being put in place.

== Grenfell Tower fire ==
Three years before the Grenfell Tower fire, in 2014, the Grenfell Action Group – a residents group in Grenfell Tower – wrote to Paget-Brown calling on him to "investigate the actions of the council's Planning Dept and the TMO" whom they accused of breaking the law by failing to consult the residents as regards the Grenfell Tower Improvement Works. However, when Paget-Brown was subsequently interviewed as leader of the council following the fire of 14 June 2017 on Newsnight, he caused controversy with his remark that "many residents felt that we needed to get on with the installation of new hot water systems, new boilers and that trying to retrofit more would require decanting of residents, delay the building and that sprinklers aren't the answer." He also said that containment was the nationally recognised means of preventing fire spread in blocks of flats.

On 18 June, the government relieved the borough council of responsibility for supporting the survivors, after a perceived inadequate response. On 21 June, the council's chief executive Nicholas Holgate resigned amid criticism over the borough's response to the fire. On 29 June, Paget-Brown issued instructions on legal advice that the first full meeting of the Cabinet following the fire be held in private, without the presence of local residents or the media, contrary to convention. The Guardian newspaper successfully sought an injunction requiring the meeting to be held in public. Paget-Brown was given further legal advice that, to have continued in public, he would have compromised the forthcoming public inquiry. He terminated the meeting, later accepting that it would have been better to have deferred it whilst further legal opinion was sought. Having previously resisted calls to resign, Paget-Brown announced his resignation the following day when requested to do so by the Government. A spokeswoman for Prime Minister Theresa May had earlier criticised the decision to try to hold the council meeting in private.

He was replaced as leader by fellow Conservative Elizabeth Campbell on 19 July 2017.

In June 2018, the London Review of Books devoted a full issue to the Grenfell Tower Fire. “The Tower”. It presented a very different perspective on the Grenfell tragedy and its aftermath and Paget-Brown’s response to it. It was critical of the response by Theresa May’s government, of her hostile attitude towards the Council and of some activists who sought to politicise the tragedy and to paint the Council as absent in the aftermath to it. It also identified fundamental shortcomings in the press coverage of the fire and an absence of any acknowledgement of the positive record of the Council in North Kensington for 40 years before the fire.

The report of the Grenfell Tower Inquiry presided over by Sir Martin Moore-Bick was published in September 2024. Paget-Brown gave evidence in May 2021 and was cross-examined by Richard Millet QC. He was not personally criticised in the report.

== Personal life ==
Paget-Brown has lived in Chelsea since 1984.
