= 2026 Ealing London Borough Council election =

2026 local election in England

- 7 May 2026

All 70 seats to Ealing London Borough Council 36 seats needed for a majority
- Registered: 250,275
- Turnout: 43.54% (▲3.23 pp)
	First party	Second party	Third party
Leader	Peter Mason	Gary Malcolm	Clare Welsby
Party	Labour	Liberal Democrats	Green
Leader's seat	Southall Green	Southfield	Hanwell Broadway
Last election	59 seats, 51.1%	6 seats, 15.7%	0 seats, 7.3%
Seats before	55	8	0
Seats won	46	13	5
Seat change	▼13	▲7	▲5
Popular vote	91,232	50,596	55,466
Percentage	30.0%	16.6%	18.2%
Swing	▼21.1 pp	▲0.9 pp	▲10.9 pp
	Fourth party	Fifth party	Sixth party
Leader	Julian Gallant
Party	Conservative	Independent	Reform
Leader's seat	Ealing Broadway	Norwood Green
Last election	5 seats, 24.3%	0 seats, 0.2%	Did not contest
Seats before	4	2	0
Seats won	5	1	0
Seat change	Steady	▲1	Steady
Popular vote	53,829	2,591	32,959
Percentage	17.7%	0.9%	10.8%
Swing	▼6.6 pp	▲0.7 pp	New
- Map of the results of the 2026 Ealing London Borough council election. Labour in red, Green in green, Conservatives in blue, Liberal Democrats in orange, Independents in black. Striped wards have mixed representation.
Leader before election
Peter Mason
Labour
Leader after election
Peter Mason
Labour

The 2026 Ealing London Borough Council election took place on 7 May 2026, as part of the 2026 United Kingdom local elections. All 70 members of Ealing London Borough Council were elected. The election took place alongside local elections in the other London boroughs.

The Labour Party won the election with 46 seats, despite getting just a 27.7% share of the vote.

== Background ==
=== History ===
Result of the 2022 borough election

The thirty-two London boroughs were established in 1965 by the London Government Act 1963. They are the principal authorities in Greater London and have responsibilities including education, housing, planning, highways, social services, libraries, recreation, waste, environmental health and revenue collection. Some of the powers are shared with the Greater London Authority, which also manages passenger transport, police and fire. The borough of Ealing contains the towns of Acton, Ealing, Greenford, Hanwell, Northolt, Perivale and Southall.

Since its formation, Ealing has been under either Labour control or Conservative control. The council has had an overall Labour majority since the 2010 election. In the most recent election in 2022, Labour won 59 seats, the Liberal Democrats won six and the Conservatives won five. The incumbent leader of the council is the Labour councillor Peter Mason, who has held that position since May 2021.

=== Council term ===
In July 2024, three councillors were elected as Members of Parliament (MPs), Labour councillors Callum Anderson and Deirdre Costigan and Conservative councillor Gregory Stafford.

As a result, three by-elections took place. The 2024 South Acton by-election and 2024 Northolt Mandeville by-election were both held by Labour, while the Conservatives lost the 2024 Hanger Hill by-election to Liberal Democrat Jonathan Oxley.

In May 2025, the Liberal Democrats formed a shadow cabinet in opposition to the Labour administration, with each of the seven Lib Dem councillors having a role.

Swaran Padda left the Labour Party in November 2025, and John Martin left the party in April 2026. Aysha Raza died in April 2026, with the seat left vacant until the election.

== Electoral process ==
Ealing, as is the case all other London borough councils, elects all of its councillors at once every four years, with the previous election having taken place in 2022. The election takes place by multi-member first-past-the-post voting, with each ward being represented by two or three councillors. Electors will have as many votes as there are councillors to be elected in their ward, with the top two or three being elected.

All registered electors (British, Irish, Commonwealth and European Union citizens) living in London aged 18 or over are entitled to vote in the election. People who live at two addresses in different councils, such as university students with different term-time and holiday addresses, are entitled to be registered for and vote in elections in both local authorities. Voting in-person at polling stations takes place from 7:00 to 22:00 on election day, and voters are able to apply for postal votes or proxy votes in advance of the election.

== Council composition ==
After 2022 election		Before 2026 election		After 2026 election	
Party	Seats	Party	Seats	Party	Seats
Labour	59	Labour	58	Labour	46
Liberal Democrats	6	Liberal Democrats	8	Liberal Democrats	13
Conservative	5	Conservative	4	Conservative	5
		Vacant	1	Green	5
				Independent	1

== Results summary ==
2026 Ealing London Borough Council election
Party	Seats	Gains	Losses	Net gain/loss	Seats %	Votes %	Votes	+/−
Labour	46	0	13	▼13	65.7	30.0	91,232	▼21.1
Liberal Democrats	13	7	0	▲7	18.6	16.6	50,596	▲0.9
Green	5	5	0	▲5	7.1	18.2	55,466	▲10.9
Conservative	5	3	3	Steady	7.1	17.7	53,829	▼6.6
Independent	1	1	0	▲1	1.4	0.9	2,591	▲0.7
Reform	0	0	0		0.0	10.8	32,959	N/A
Ealing Community Independents	0	0	0	Steady	0.0	5.1	15,598	N/A
Rejoin EU	0	0	0		0.0	0.4	1,301	N/A
TUSC	0	0	0	Steady	0.0	0.2	474	▼0.2
SDP	0	0	0	Steady	0.0	0.0	142	Steady

== Ward results ==
There are 70 candidates for the Labour Party, 69 for the Liberal Democrats, 69 for the Conservative Party, 61 for Reform UK, 54 for The Green Party, 26 for the Ealing Community Independents, five for the Trade Unionist and Socialist Coalition, five for Rejoin EU, four Independents, and one for the Social Democratic Party.

=== Central Greenford ===
Central Greenford (3 seats)
Party	Candidate	Votes	%	±%
Labour	Munir Abbasi	1,254	31.6	−20.6
Labour	Valery Ryan	1,200	30.2	−20.6
Labour	Sanjai Kohli*	1,162	29.2	−21.8
Conservative	Benjamin Davies	854	21.5	−8.1
Conservative	Cathy Frisina	785	19.8	−6.6
Green	Ted Chase	772	19.4	+6.9
Green	Florence Olden-Chandler	760	19.1	N/A
Reform	Natalia Cassel	746	18.8	N/A
Conservative	Peter Smith	731	18.4	−6.4
Reform	Bob Little	668	16.8	N/A
Green	Frank Proud	620	15.6	N/A
Reform	Filomena Strollo	606	15.3	N/A
Liberal Democrats	Matthew Hirst	393	9.9	−0.2
Liberal Democrats	John William Mitchell	346	8.7	−0.9
Liberal Democrats	Ian Rex-Hawkes	272	6.8	−2.7
Independent	Haitham Idriss	210	5.3	N/A
Turnout		3,973	38.81	+1.57
Rejected ballots				
Labour hold				
Labour hold				
Labour hold				

=== Dormers Wells ===
Dormers Wells (3 seats)
Party	Candidate	Votes	%	±%
Labour	Kanwal Bains*	1,563	37.8	−27.1
Labour	Ranjit Dheer*	1,361	32.9	−28.6
Labour	Isabel Owen	1,268	30.7	−28.4
Ealing Community Independents	Raj Gill	783	18.9	N/A
Ealing Community Independents	Khalil Ahmed	773	18.7	N/A
Green	Annette Dean	759	18.4	+8.8
Green	Mark Eccleston	692	16.7	N/A
Conservative	Babul Sharker	684	16.5	+0.1
Conservative	Dolu Khan	634	15.3	−0.9
Ealing Community Independents	Anwar Sabar	621	15.0	N/A
Conservative	Md Uddin	597	14.4	−1.1
Reform	Alex Beniatian	470	11.4	N/A
Reform	David Burvill	442	10.7	N/A
Liberal Democrats	Bob Browning	270	6.5	−2.3
Liberal Democrats	Oliver Murphy	229	5.5	−1.8
Rejoin EU	Mohd Uddin	218	5.3	N/A
Liberal Democrats	Pat Mellor	207	5.0	−1.8
Turnout		4,135	39.42	+2.15
Rejected ballots				
Labour hold				
Labour hold				
Labour hold				

=== Ealing Broadway ===
Ealing Broadway (3 seats)
Party	Candidate	Votes	%	±%
Conservative	Julian Gallant*	1,780	36.5	−5.3
Conservative	Sean Hanrahan	1,575	32.3	−8.4
Liberal Democrats	Adam Keenan	1,413	29.0	+11.3
Conservative	Seema Kumar*	1,396	28.7	−10.2
Liberal Democrats	Francesco Fruzza	1,328	27.3	+9.9
Liberal Democrats	Mandy Lurie	1,228	25.2	+10.0
Green	Freya Summersgill	1,016	20.9	−1.0
Green	Neil Reynolds	933	19.2	N/A
Green	Mark Uddin	770	15.8	N/A
Labour	Alex Norfolk	704	14.4	−18.6
Labour	Mahdi Imam Murtaza	636	13.1	−18.3
Labour	Iram Woolley	598	12.3	−15.5
Reform	David Hounsell	460	9.4	N/A
Rejoin EU	Georgie Louise Hare	235	4.8	N/A
Turnout		4,872	50.11	+7.64
Rejected ballots				
Conservative hold				
Conservative hold				
Liberal Democrats gain from Conservative				

=== Ealing Common ===
Ealing Common (3 seats)
Party	Candidate	Votes	%	±%
Liberal Democrats	Jon Ball*	2,227	43.5	±0.0
Liberal Democrats	Connie Hersch*	2,044	39.9	+3.1
Liberal Democrats	Lakhbir Singh	1,643	32.1	−2.8
Green	Lewis Garland	1,029	20.1	+2.6
Green	Alex Vines	984	19.2	N/A
Labour	Keith Broomfield	921	18.0	−18.2
Labour	Maxim Bagdasarian	873	17.1	−11.9
Green	Alexandru-Andrei Abutoaiei	842	16.4	N/A
Labour	Mohinder Mihda	816	15.9	−11.5
Conservative	John Cowing	720	14.1	−6.3
Conservative	Samuel Gibb	634	12.4	−8.0
Conservative	Roz Reece	627	12.2	−7.2
Reform	Simon Ludgate	560	10.9	N/A
Reform	Martin Shippey	542	10.6	N/A
Reform	Jai Dhawan	523	10.2	N/A
Turnout		5,119	46.66	+0.9
Rejected ballots				
Liberal Democrats hold				
Liberal Democrats hold				
Liberal Democrats gain from Labour				

=== East Acton ===
East Acton (3 seats)
Party	Candidate	Votes	%	±%
Labour	Stephen Donnelly*	1,229	30.3	−24.1
Labour	Rabia Nasimi	1,207	29.8	−33.3
Labour	Hitesh Tailor*	1,123	27.7	−24.0
Green	Sam Diamond	1,055	26.0	+7.6
Green	Suzanne Fernandes	1,035	25.5	N/A
Green	Marijn van de Geer	950	23.5	N/A
Liberal Democrats	Kate Crawford*	838	20.7	−42.4
Liberal Democrats	Abdi Ahmed	678	16.7	+5.9
Liberal Democrats	Benedict Cross	586	14.5	+5.6
Conservative	Richard Arnold	529	13.1	−7.8
Reform	Jeremy Bradshaw	511	12.6	N/A
Conservative	Calvin Chan	473	11.7	−9.9
Conservative	Patrick Kennedy	494	12.2	−6.9
Reform	Michele Farruggio	468	11.6	N/A
Reform	Djivan Souren	413	10.2	N/A
TUSC	Amirah Abrahams	98	2.4	−1.4
Turnout		4,051	39.67	+6.35
Rejected ballots				
Labour hold				
Labour hold				
Labour hold				

=== Greenford Broadway ===
Greenford Broadway (3 seats)
Party	Candidate	Votes	%	±%
Labour	Anthony Kelly	1,363	32.6	−25.9
Labour	Stephanie Ajayi	1,357	32.4	−27.9
Labour	Harbhajan Dheer*	1,176	28.1	−28.2
Reform	Terri Beniatian	907	21.7	N/A
Green	Joanna Fleck	889	21.2	+8.9
Green	Matt Chadburn	805	19.2	N/A
Reform	Sanjay Pote	777	18.6	N/A
Reform	Jyoti Satam	732	17.5	N/A
Conservative	Peter Edwards	711	17.0	−7.7
Conservative	Predrag Babic	653	15.6	−6.9
Conservative	Sean Keeley	645	15.4	−4.5
Ealing Community Independents	Cathy Swift	411	9.8	N/A
Ealing Community Independents	Yousef Qandeel	383	9.2	N/A
Liberal Democrats	Gillian Rowley	283	6.8	−1.0
Liberal Democrats	Anna Salaman	234	5.6	−1.8
Rejoin EU	Raj Thanga	212	5.1	N/A
Liberal Democrats	Tal Thomas	180	4.3	−2.2
TUSC	Dara Fitzgerald	87	2.1	N/A
Turnout		4,184	37.09	+3.68
Rejected ballots				
Labour hold				
Labour hold				
Labour hold				

=== Hanger Hill ===
Hanger Hill (3 seats)
Party	Candidate	Votes	%	±%
Liberal Democrats	Jonathan Oxley*	1,805	38.2	+6.8
Liberal Democrats	Athena Zissimos*	1,764	37.3	+1.1
Liberal Democrats	Mark Sanders	1,639	34.7	+2.9
Conservative	Edward Bailey	1,103	23.3	−10.7
Green	Kate Crossland	1,017	21.5	+7.4
Conservative	Anthony Young	997	21.1	−12.7
Conservative	Dea Omari	810	17.1	−15.2
Green	Hadi Khorsandi	770	16.3	N/A
Green	Ben Fryer	722	15.3	N/A
Labour	Catherine Ann Wallace	570	12.1	−13.3
Labour	David John Lines	556	11.8	−13.4
Reform	Michael Minkov	537	11.4	N/A
Reform	Deshal Raja	487	10.3	N/A
Labour	Cianan John Whelan	451	9.5	−14.4
Rejoin EU	Peter Mark Ward	175	3.7	N/A
SDP	Stephen Andrew Balogh	142	3.0	N/A
Turnout		4,726	43.04	+1.1
Liberal Democrats hold				
Liberal Democrats gain from Conservative				
Liberal Democrats gain from Conservative				

=== Hanwell Broadway ===
Hanwell Broadway (3 seats)
Party	Candidate	Votes	%	±%
Green	Clare Welsby	2,050	38.7	+8.1
Green	Natalia Kubica	2,001	37.8	+8.3
Green	Andrew Walkley	1,924	36.3	+12.8
Labour	Polly Knewstub*	1,773	33.5	−6.2
Labour	Yoel Gordon*	1,621	30.6	−10.3
Labour	Alexander Ewart Dismore	1,594	30.1	−10.5
Reform	Reg Anderson	627	11.8	N/A
Reform	Jaroslaw Andrysiak	601	11.4	N/A
Reform	Salim Izza	491	9.3	N/A
Conservative	Richard Reade	458	8.7	−10.3
Liberal Democrats	Edward Cook	452	8.5	−5.6
Conservative	Edward Iredale	445	8.4	−9.3
Liberal Democrats	Leslie Glancy	409	7.7	−5.2
Conservative	Hussein Ali Dima	392	7.4	−6.8
Liberal Democrats	Stephen O'Shea	386	7.3	−0.6
Rejoin EU	Taslema Akhter	260	4.9	N/A
Turnout		5,294	49.38	+5.92
Green gain from Labour				
Green gain from Labour				
Green gain from Labour				

=== Lady Margaret ===
Lady Margaret (3 seats)
Party	Candidate	Votes	%	±%
Labour	Praveen Anand	1,744	41.3	−22.6
Labour	Karam Mohan*	1,594	37.8	−26.6
Labour	Monica Hamidi (Note: incumbent councillor for Hanwell Broadway.)	1,551	36.7	−26.3
Green	Nicholas Chapman	1,014	24.0	+11.0
Green	Olivia Law-Zygaldo	863	20.4	N/A
Independent	Gurpreet Singh Sahota	745	17.6	N/A
Reform	Gulshan Ahluwalia	704	16.7	N/A
Reform	Robert Balaam	642	15.2	N/A
Conservative	Rafiq Islam	612	14.5	−6.0
Conservative	Nazrul Islam	570	13.5	−3.8
Conservative	Abul Kalam Azad Sarker	536	12.7	−3.5
Liberal Democrats	Loreta Alac	396	9.4	+0.7
Liberal Democrats	John Gower	386	9.1	±0.0
Liberal Democrats	Philip Wells	355	8.4	+2.8
Turnout		4,221	38.60	+0.11
Rejected ballots				
Labour hold				
Labour hold				
Labour hold				

=== North Acton ===
North Acton (3 seats)
Party	Candidate	Votes	%	±%
Labour	Blerina Hashani*	1,356	32.9	−13.0
Green	Simon Anthony	1,298	31.5	+11.2
Labour	Hodan Haili*	1,296	31.5	−15.4
Labour	Guneet Singh Malik	1,186	28.8	−28.0
Green	Maciej Pawlik	1,051	25.5	N/A
Green	Nasim Nur	1,001	24.3	N/A
Conservative	Sarah Beament	592	14.4	−6.1
Conservative	Sally Gorman	551	13.4	−6.8
Reform	Bob Baker	530	12.9	N/A
Liberal Democrats	Simon Quince	511	12.4	−1.6
Conservative	Ann Lazarow	502	12.2	−9.6
Reform	Caroline Fanneran	496	12.1	N/A
Reform	Alan Warr	449	10.9	N/A
Liberal Democrats	Alan Whelan	396	9.6	−0.9
Liberal Democrats	Patrick Salaun	386	9.4	−2.0
Rejoin EU	Kamlesh Mehta	201	4.9	N/A
TUSC	David Lawrence Hofman	83	2.0	−1.3
Turnout		4,116	37.54	+6.83
Rejected ballots				
Labour hold				
Green gain from Labour				
Labour hold				

=== North Greenford ===
North Greenford (3 seats)
Party	Candidate	Votes	%	±%
Conservative	Flora Macloughlin	1,925	38.7	+13.4
Conservative	Kristian Mower	1,773	35.7	+12.6
Conservative	Ajay Roy	1,748	35.2	+14.2
Labour Co-op	Javaid Iqbal*	1,487	29.9	−23.7
Labour Co-op	Amarjit Jammu*	1,331	26.8	−29.9
Labour Co-op	Shital Manro*	1,323	26.6	−28.7
Green	Ryan Allain	1,106	22.3	+9.4
Green	Korhan Tunca	874	17.6	N/A
Reform	Monika Williams	559	11.2	N/A
Reform	Jonathan Notley	554	11.1	N/A
Liberal Democrats	Jim Doona	386	7.8	−4.6
Liberal Democrats	Bex Scott	323	6.5	−5.0
Liberal Democrats	John Gauss	307	6.2	−3.8
Turnout		4,969	43.59	+5.18
Rejected ballots				
Conservative gain from Labour				
Conservative gain from Labour				
Conservative gain from Labour				

=== North Hanwell ===
North Hanwell (3 seats)
Party	Candidate	Votes	%	±%
Labour	Louise Brett*	1,803	37.3	−20.2
Labour	Ray Wall*	1,611	33.3	−16.3
Labour	Lauren Wall	1,600	33.1	−21.8
Green	Dominic Kirkbride	1,478	30.6	+9.2
Green	Tegan Millard	1,377	28.5	N/A
Green	John Rolt	1,226	25.4	N/A
Conservative	Ian Potts	738	15.3	−5.8
Reform	Andrew Evzona	716	14.8	N/A
Reform	Felicity Georghiades	677	14.0	N/A
Conservative	Kamran Ali	586	12.1	−9.6
Liberal Democrats	Zoe Horwich	509	10.5	−5.4
Conservative	Minoo Sullivan	485	10.0	−9.6
Liberal Democrats	Geoffrey Berg	442	9.1	−2.4
Liberal Democrats	Martin Williams	412	8.5	+0.7
TUSC	Tony Gill	77	1.6	−2.3
Turnout		4,832	49.25	+8.45
Rejected ballots				
Labour hold				
Labour hold				
Labour hold				

=== Northfield ===
Northfield (3 seats)
Party	Candidate	Votes	%	±%
Labour	Paul Driscoll*	1,886	31.7	−12.6
Labour	Sinead Whelan	1,762	29.6	−7.7
Labour	Ian Kingston*	1,639	27.5	−13.2
Green	Nikki Daniel	1,371	23.0	+7.4
Green	Ruby Smith	1,263	21.2	+6.4
Green	Ian Douglas	1,129	19.0	+7.1
Liberal Democrats	Mark Andrews	960	16.1	+3.1
Conservative	Theresa Mullins	931	15.6	−16.8
Conservative	Arthur Alexander	912	15.3	−15.3
Liberal Democrats	Nigel Bakhai	829	13.9	+1.7
Conservative	Anita Kapoor	819	13.8	−17.4
Liberal Democrats	Robert Hall	760	12.8	+4.0
Ealing Community Independents	Craig Smith	621	10.4	N/A
Ealing Community Independents	Mike Barnshaw	593	10.0	N/A
Ealing Community Independents	Florence Pinaud	587	9.9	N/A
Reform	Nigel Bird	517	8.7	N/A
Reform	Karen McFall	490	8.2	N/A
Reform	Joshue Lemontagnard	446	7.5	N/A
Turnout		5,953	57.07	+3.34
Rejected ballots				
Labour hold				
Labour hold				
Labour hold				

=== Northolt Mandeville ===
Northolt Mandeville (3 seats)
Party	Candidate	Votes	%	±%
Labour	Andrew Bailey	1,779	41.2	−20.0
Labour	Miriam Rice*	1,452	33.6	−21.8
Labour	Dominic Moffitt*	1,387	32.1	−23.0
Green	Katy Barton	931	21.6	+8.5
Reform	Donal de Blacam	915	21.2	N/A
Reform	Conrad Lewandowski	869	20.1	N/A
Reform	Marco Manassero	818	18.9	N/A
Green	Beth McCormack	812	18.8	N/A
Conservative	James Bremen	723	16.7	−12.8
Conservative	Andrew Maddox	671	15.5	−8.1
Conservative	Elliott Malik	584	13.5	−10.0
Liberal Democrats	Lawrence Aggleton	429	9.9	+3.1
Liberal Democrats	Leslie Hurst	388	9.0	+1.6
Liberal Democrats	Jim McWilliams	321	7.4	+2.2
Turnout		4,319	37.28	+0.22
Rejected ballots				
Labour hold				
Labour hold				
Labour hold				

=== Northolt West End ===
Northolt West End (3 seats)
Party	Candidate	Votes	%	±%
Labour	Atlyn Forde	1,568	41.6	−22.8
Labour	Bassam Mahfouz*	1,490	39.5	−22.3
Labour	Dee Martin*	1,369	36.3	−28.3
Green	Ryan Jendoubi	866	23.0	+9.9
Reform	Lee Marriott	835	22.1	N/A
Reform	Maxine Williams	793	21.0	N/A
Reform	Seb Wallace	787	20.9	N/A
Conservative	Fabio Conti	630	16.7	−3.0
Conservative	Janet Young	546	14.5	−2.8
Conservative	Diva Nazari	458	12.1	−3.9
Liberal Democrats	Lee Horwich	309	8.2	−0.8
Liberal Democrats	Milena Izmirlieva	291	7.7	+0.1
Liberal Democrats	Tony Miller	272	7.2	−0.2
Turnout		3,773	35.50	+3.20
Rejected ballots				
Labour hold				
Labour hold				
Labour hold				

=== Norwood Green ===
Norwood Green (3 seats)
Party	Candidate	Votes	%	±%
Independent	John Martin	1,396	31.3	−39.0
Labour	Jags Sanghera	1,275	28.6	−41.7
Labour	Ghulam Murtaza	1,255	28.2	−36.0
Labour	Claire Tighe (Note: incumbent councillor for North Hanwell.)	1,234	27.7	−39.9
Green	Michal Solski	893	20.0	+6.5
Ealing Community Independents	Mark Benjamin	746	16.7	N/A
Ealing Community Independents	Happy Singh Dhaliwal	684	15.3	N/A
Conservative	George Lafford	658	14.8	±0.0
Ealing Community Independents	Jahangir Raina	632	14.2	N/A
Conservative	Gunshibha Wadwa	630	14.1	±0.0
Reform	David Burgess	516	11.6	N/A
Conservative	Aminur Ony	468	10.5	−2.8
Reform	Olu Ogunsanlu	358	8.0	N/A
Liberal Democrats	Rehana Ali	340	7.6	+0.6
Liberal Democrats	Susan Henderson	316	7.1	+1.4
Liberal Democrats	Michael Pidoux	206	4.6	−0.6
Turnout		4,457	40.12	+3.13
Rejected ballots				
Independent gain from Labour				
Labour hold				
Labour hold				

=== Perivale ===
Perivale (3 seats)
Party	Candidate	Votes	%	±%
Labour	Munir Ahmed*	1,704	35.7	−19.4
Labour	Tariq Mahmood*	1,660	34.8	−18.5
Labour	Charan Sharma*	1,448	30.3	−21.2
Green	Juliana Niederwanger	1,121	23.5	+12.1
Conservative	Ian Proud	1,016	21.3	−10.6
Conservative	Vlod Barchuk	979	20.5	−6.6
Conservative	Zekél Atherley	945	19.8	−7.3
Ealing Community Independents	Debbie Allen	751	15.7	N/A
Reform	Marie Marjolin	688	14.4	N/A
Reform	Gabor Horvath	672	14.1	N/A
Reform	Jedidiah Sivapalan	615	12.9	N/A
Liberal Democrats	Carl Brooks	503	10.5	+1.9
Liberal Democrats	Sarah Seton-Rogers	456	9.6	+1.7
Liberal Democrats	Clive Davis	430	9.0	+2.7
Turnout		4,774	42.30	+1.06
Rejected ballots				
Labour hold				
Labour hold				
Labour hold				

=== Pitshanger ===
Pitshanger (3 seats)
Party	Candidate	Votes	%	±%
Labour	Rima Baaklini*	1,836	34.3	−8.2
Labour	Ben Wesson*	1,579	29.5	−10.6
Labour	Shaira Karimi	1,568	29.3	−11.4
Conservative	Will Copping	1,414	26.4	−5.4
Conservative	Grace Hunter	1,395	26.0	−3.8
Conservative	Liz Paice	1,307	24.4	−3.7
Green	Alex James	1,097	20.5	N/A
Green	Emma Powell	1,025	19.1	N/A
Green	Sarah McCartney	1,020	19.0	+1.6
Liberal Democrats	Francesco Fruzza	627	11.7	−10.6
Liberal Democrats	Rod Nathan	614	11.5	−4.9
Reform	Will Calito	536	10.0	N/A
Liberal Democrats	Humaira Sanders	499	9.3	−5.3
Reform	Chris Lumb	493	9.2	N/A
Reform	Kas Ullah	407	7.6	N/A
Ealing Community Independents	Tina Moonen	217	4.1	N/A
Turnout		5,357	50.48	+2.42
Rejected ballots				
Labour hold				
Labour hold				
Labour hold				

=== South Acton ===
South Acton (3 seats)
Party	Candidate	Votes	%	±%
Labour	Katie Douglas*	1,469	33.0	−25.2
Labour	Yvonne Johnson*	1,306	29.3	−26.8
Green	Husam Alharahsheh	1,239	27.8	+4.6
Green	Christina Meiklejohn	1,195	26.8	N/A
Labour	Gareth Shaw	1,128	25.3	−28.3
Green	Elyes Rezgui	957	21.5	N/A
Conservative	Antoni Bialek	550	12.3	−5.6
Ealing Community Independents	Miça Evans	542	12.2	N/A
Liberal Democrats	Luke Hearn	510	11.4	−0.3
Ealing Community Independents	Elizabeth Jones	486	10.9	N/A
Liberal Democrats	Margaret Joachim	479	10.7	−3.1
Conservative	Stephen Peach	479	10.7	−7.4
Reform	Anna Grayson-Morley	454	10.2	N/A
Conservative	Anura Keppetipola	446	10.0	−5.4
Ealing Community Independents	Glen Miller	433	9.7	N/A
Reform	Stephen Jewell	432	9.7	N/A
Reform	Nicholas Rees	407	9.1	N/A
Liberal Democrats	Peter Roche	391	8.8	+0.3
Turnout		4,457	37.87	+3.07
Rejected ballots				
Labour hold				
Labour hold				
Green gain from Labour				

=== Southall Broadway ===
Southall Broadway (2 seats)
Party	Candidate	Votes	%	±%
Labour	Shahbaz Ahmed	1,079	32.5	−25.3
Labour	Kamaljit Nagpal	1,043	31.4	−28.1
Ealing Community Independents	Angela Fonso	804	24.2	N/A
Conservative	Darshan Bhinder	768	23.2	+1.7
Conservative	Mohd Miah	642	19.4	+0.6
Ealing Community Independents	Chaudhry Iqbal	612	18.5	N/A
Green	Rowan Beentje	453	13.7	+6.8
Reform	Sheung-yuen Lee	254	7.7	N/A
Liberal Democrats	Robin Bettridge	204	6.2	−0.9
Reform	Mo Latif	197	5.9	N/A
Liberal Democrats	David Zerdin	120	3.6	−0.3
Turnout		3,317	44.94	+3.11
Rejected ballots				
Labour hold				
Labour hold				

=== Southall Green ===
Southall Green (3 seats)
Party	Candidate	Votes	%	±%
Labour	Jasbir Anand	1,789	40.2	−28.7
Labour	Kamaljit Dhindsa	1,666	37.5	−19.8
Labour	Peter Mason	1,596	35.9	−27.5
Ealing Community Independents	Joe Bhangu	1,129	25.4	N/A
Ealing Community Independents	Minni Dogra	1,107	24.9	N/A
Ealing Community Independents	Jatinder Rajput	1,036	23.3	N/A
Conservative	Sabikun Nahar	624	14.0	−3.8
Conservative	Mohammed Jashim Uddin	620	13.9	−2.2
Green	Liza Halim	554	12.5	+6.5
Conservative	Khandaker Rahman	536	12.1	−2.5
Reform	Robert Harwood	395	8.9	N/A
Reform	Kamaljit Tambar	290	6.5	N/A
Reform	Horatiu Ilie	275	6.2	N/A
Independent	Swaran Padda	240	5.4	N/A
Liberal Democrats	Susan Kendrick	221	5.0	−0.3
Liberal Democrats	Derek Groen	207	4.7	+1.8
Liberal Democrats	Rusi Dalal	161	3.6	+0.4
Turnout		4,446	42.02	−0.78
Rejected ballots				
Labour hold				
Labour hold				
Labour hold				

=== Southall West ===
Southall West (2 seats)
Party	Candidate	Votes	%	±%
Labour	Kim Nagpal	819	34.6	−22.9
Labour	Faduma Mohamed	740	31.3	−16.3
Conservative	Md Feroz Khan	550	23.2	+10.2
Conservative	Mohammad Miah	486	20.5	+1.1
Ealing Community Independents	Sukhi Floria	460	19.4	N/A
Ealing Community Independents	Dan Cortese	456	19.3	N/A
Green	Gurpal Kular	415	17.5	+10.7
Reform	Steve Johnston	179	7.6	N/A
Liberal Democrats	Alison Cross	136	5.7	+1.3
Reform	Zeljko Leventic	122	5.2	N/A
Liberal Democrats	Roger Davies	108	4.6	+1.3
Turnout		2,368	43.92	−1.15
Rejected ballots				
Labour hold				
Labour hold				

=== Southfield ===
Southfield (3 seats)
Party	Candidate	Votes	%	±%
Liberal Democrats	Gary Busuttil	2,587	46.9	−3.5
Liberal Democrats	Gary Malcolm	2,567	46.5	−5.1
Liberal Democrats	Andrew Steed	2,488	45.1	−5.9
Green	Laura Darwish	1,181	21.4	N/A
Green	Mike Landon	1,035	18.7	+1.2
Labour	Ayomilekan Adegunwa	859	15.6	−10.3
Labour	Dean Gilligan	825	14.9	−5.3
Labour	Jeannie Okikiolu	794	14.4	−4.7
Conservative	Chris Brown	768	13.9	−4.2
Conservative	Charlotte Duthie	704	12.8	−4.6
Conservative	Darryll Coates	657	11.9	−5.0
Reform	Elaine Jelly	465	8.4	N/A
Reform	Matthew Martin	450	8.2	N/A
Reform	Tom Vanson	425	7.7	N/A
TUSC	Helen Pattison	129	2.3	N/A
Turnout		5,521	48.06	+3.89
Rejected ballots				
Liberal Democrats hold				
Liberal Democrats hold				
Liberal Democrats hold				

=== Walpole ===
Walpole (3 seats)
Party	Candidate	Votes	%	±%
Liberal Democrats	Matt Mellor	2,201	38.4	+21.4
Liberal Democrats	Will Francis	2,079	36.3	+16.4
Liberal Democrats	Ksenia Maximova	1,924	33.6	+18.3
Labour	Catherine Fitzgibbon	1,428	24.9	−14.6
Labour	Grace Barbara Quansah	1,307	22.8	−17.7
Labour	Binda Rai	1,235	21.6	−19.1
Green	Barry Greenan	1,095	19.1	+5.3
Green	Robin Gutch	1,083	18.9	+4.7
Green	Tom Matthews	1,048	18.3	+6.8
Conservative	Isobel Grant	726	12.7	−14.9
Reform	Brian Coe	502	8.8	N/A
Reform	Marian Glynn	462	8.1	N/A
Conservative	Anu Khela	449	7.8	−19.8
Conservative	Shanuk Mediwaka	393	6.9	−17.8
Ealing Community Independents	Carl Russell	258	4.5	N/A
Ealing Community Independents	Richard Tall	243	4.2	N/A
Ealing Community Independents	Darius Ghazyzadeh	230	4.0	N/A
Turnout		5,730	55.67	+5.31
Rejected ballots				
Liberal Democrats gain from Labour				
Liberal Democrats gain from Labour				
Liberal Democrats gain from Labour				

== By-Elections ==
=== North Acton ===
A by-election was held on 25 June 2026 in North Acton ward, following the resignation of Cllr Simon Anthony.

North Acton, 25 June 2026
Party	Candidate	Votes	%	±%
Green	Marijn van de Geer	804	30.2	−1.3
Labour	Gareth Shaw	642	24.1	−4.7
Liberal Democrats	Abdi Ahmed	523	19.6	+7.2
Reform	Jonathan Notley	309	11.6	−1.3
Conservative	Sally Gorman	257	9.6	−3.8
Ealing Community Independents	Craig Smith	129	4.8	N/A
Turnout		2,674	24.21	−13.33
Rejected ballots				
Green hold				
