= Ealing Central and Acton =

UK Parliament constituency (since 2010)

Coordinates: 51.51°N 0.28°W

- Borough constituency for the House of Commons
- Interactive map of boundaries from 2024
- Location within Greater London
- County: Greater London
- Electorate: 75,399 (March 2020)

Current constituency
- Created: 2010
- Member of Parliament: Rupa Huq (Labour)
- Seats: One
- Created from: Ealing, Acton and Shepherd's Bush, Ealing Southall, Ealing North

Ealing Central and Acton is a constituency created in 2010, (Note: A borough constituency (for the purposes of election expenses and type of returning officer)) represented in the House of Commons of the UK Parliament since 2015 by Rupa Huq, (Note: As with all constituencies, the constituency elects one Member of Parliament (MP) by the first past the post system of election at least every five years.) who was elected as a Labour MP, suspended from the party in September 2022 following alleged racist comments, and reinstated in March 2023.

== Constituency profile ==
Ealing Central and Acton is a suburban constituency located in the Borough of Ealing in London. It covers the central and eastern parts of Ealing and the town of Acton. Like much of suburban London, the area was rural until the arrival of rail transport in the 19th century. The constituency has average levels of deprivation and is highly ethnically diverse. At the 2021 census, 32% of the population were White British with 56% in total identifying as White; the constituency has significant Irish and Polish communities. Asians were 16%, Black people were 11% and other ethnic groups were 11%. House prices are above the London average and more than double the national average.

In general, residents of the constituency are young, well-educated and have high incomes. They are less likely to be homeowners and more likely to work in professional occupations compared to the rest of the country. At the local council level, Acton and the east of the constituency are mostly represented by Labour councillors, whilst Ealing and the west elected Conservatives and Liberal Democrats. Voters in the constituency overwhelmingly supported remaining in the European Union in the 2016 referendum; an estimated 69% voted in favour of remaining, one of the top 50 highest rates out of 650 constituencies nationwide.

== Political history ==
The Fifth Periodic Review of Westminster constituencies created the seat by selecting wards for the year 2010 to equalise electorates. Here, if votes were cast as in 2005, this seat would have produced a three-way marginal between the Conservative (32.8%), Labour (32.6%), and Liberal Democrats (29.7%) parties. An analysis of intervening local results indicated that the seat would, if no voters were swung nor new voters introduced, present a tiny Labour majority.

2010 campaign

In the 2010 general election, Angie Bray, a Conservative, won the seat with a majority of 3,716, representing a swing from Labour to the Conservatives of 5%. (Note: Based upon the notional outcome of an election fought with electoral wards from the various previous seats fought in the previous election.)

2015

According to the BBC, heavy campaigning in the 2015 general election was expected by leading figures and regional activists of the two largest political parties; at the time it was 56th on the list of Labour target seats. In a mixed election for two-way targets of the two largest parties, Labour's Rupa Huq won the constituency. The 2015 result gave the seat the 2nd most marginal majority of Labour's 232 seats by percentage of majority.

2017

In April 2017, the Green Party announced that it would not stand a candidate in this constituency for the 2017 general election and instead lend its support to the sitting MP, Rupa Huq.

== Boundaries ==
=== 2010–2024 ===
The constituency consisted of the following electoral wards of the London Borough of Ealing:

- Acton Central, Ealing Broadway, Ealing Common, East Acton, Hanger Hill, South Acton, Southfield, and Walpole

The constituency was created with an electorate close to the electoral quota of 69,703 for 2006.

=== Current ===
Further to the 2023 review of Westminster constituencies, which came into effect for the 2024 general election, the constituency is composed of:

- The London Borough of Ealing wards of: Ealing Broadway; Ealing Common; East Acton; Hanger Hill; North Acton; South Acton; Southfield.
- The London Borough of Hammersmith and Fulham wards of: College Park & Old Oak; Wormholt.

The new boundaries reflect the local authority boundary review in Ealing which came into effect in May 2022. The two Hammersmith and Fulham wards were added from Hammersmith (abolished), offset by the transfer of the Ealing Borough ward of Walpole to Ealing Southall.

== Members of Parliament ==
Election	Member	Party
2010	Angie Bray	Conservative
2015	Rupa Huq	Labour
2022	Rupa Huq	Independent
2023	Rupa Huq	Labour

== Election results ==
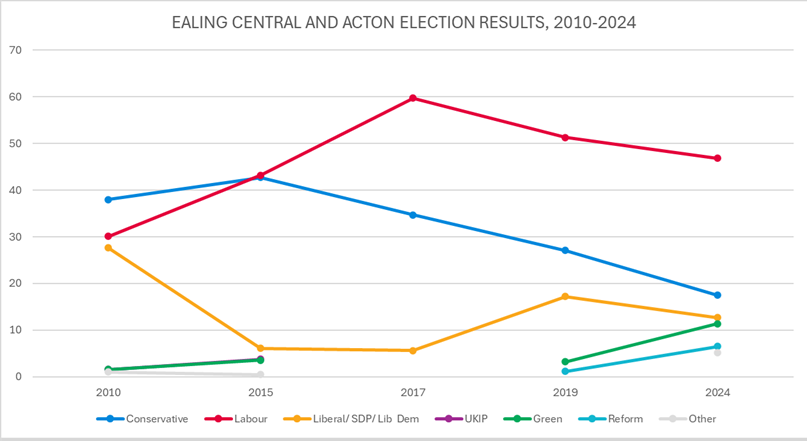
Election results 2010-2024

=== Elections in the 2020s ===
General election 2024: Ealing Central and Acton
Party	Candidate	Votes	%	±%
Labour	Rupa Huq	22,340	46.8	–5.5
Conservative	James Windsor-Clive	8,345	17.5	–8.1
Liberal Democrats	Alastair Mitton	6,056	12.7	–4.6
Green	Kate Crossland	5,444	11.4	+8.0
Reform	Felix Orrell	3,105	6.5	+5.1
Workers Party	Nada Jarche	1,766	3.7	N/A
SDP	Stephen Balogh	410	0.9	N/A
Independent	Julie Carter	303	0.6	N/A
Majority		13,995	29.3	+2.6
Turnout		47,769	60.9	–9.4
Registered electors		78,436		
Labour hold		Swing	▲1.3	

=== Elections in the 2010s ===
2019 notional result
Party	Vote	%
Labour	27,707	52.3
Conservative	13,574	25.6
Liberal Democrats	9,191	17.3
Green	1,793	3.4
Brexit Party	720	1.4
Turnout	52,985	70.3
Electorate	75,399	

General election 2019: Ealing Central and Acton
Party	Candidate	Votes	%	±%
Labour	Rupa Huq	28,132	51.3	▼8.4
Conservative	Julian Gallant	14,832	27.1	▼7.6
Liberal Democrats	Sonul Badiani	9,444	17.2	▲11.7
Green	Kate Crossland	1,735	3.2	N/A
Brexit Party	Samir Alsoodani	664	1.2	N/A
Majority		13,300	24.2	▼0.8
Turnout		54,807	72.6	▼2.0
Registered electors		75,510		
Labour hold		Swing	-0.3	

General election 2017: Ealing Central and Acton
Party	Candidate	Votes	%	±%
Labour	Rupa Huq	33,037	59.7	▲16.5
Conservative	Joy Morrissey	19,230	34.7	▼8.0
Liberal Democrats	Jon Ball	3,075	5.6	▼0.5
Majority		13,807	25.0	▲24.5
Turnout		55,342	74.6	▲3.2
Registered electors		74,200		
Labour hold		Swing	+12.2	

General election 2015: Ealing Central and Acton
Party	Candidate	Votes	%	±%
Labour	Rupa Huq	22,002	43.2	▲13.1
Conservative	Angie Bray	21,728	42.7	▲4.7
Liberal Democrats	Jon Ball	3,106	6.1	▼21.5
UKIP	Peter Florence	1,926	3.8	▲2.2
Green	Tom Sharman	1,841	3.6	▲2.1
Independent	Jonathan Notley	125	0.2	N/A
Workers Revolutionary	Scott Dore	73	0.1	N/A
Above and Beyond Party	Tammy Rendle	54	0.1	N/A
Europeans Party	Andrzej Rygielski	39	0.1	N/A
Majority		274	0.5	N/A
Turnout		50,894	71.4	▲3.9
Registered electors		71,422		
Labour gain from Conservative		Swing	+4.2	

General election 2010: Ealing Central and Acton
Party	Candidate	Votes	%	±%
Conservative	Angie Bray	17,944	38.0	+5.2
Labour	Bassam Mahfouz	14,228	30.1	–1.3
Liberal Democrats	Jon Ball	13,041	27.6	–1.2
UKIP	Julie Carter	765	1.6	N/A
Green	Sarah Edwards	737	1.6	N/A
Christian	Suzanne Fernandes	295	0.6	N/A
Independent Ealing Acton Communities Public Services	Sam Akaki	190	0.4	N/A
Majority		3,716	7.9	N/A
Rejected ballots		218		
Turnout		47,420	67.5	+14.2
Registered electors		70,251		
Conservative win (new seat)				

2005 notional result
Party	Vote	%
Labour	12,916	32.8
Conservative	12,381	31.5
Liberal Democrats	11,342	28.8
Others	2,706	6.9
Turnout	39,345	53.3
Electorate	69,548	

== See also ==
- List of parliamentary constituencies in London
