= Central Greenford =

Electoral ward in London, England

- Electoral ward for the Ealing London Borough Council
- Central Greenford ward boundaries since 2022
- Borough: Ealing
- County: Greater London
- Population: 14,353 (2021) (Note: 2021 Census data reported for 2022 ward boundaries)
- Electorate: 9,504 (2022)
- Major settlements: Greenford
- Area: 3.071 square kilometres (1.186 sq mi)

Current electoral ward
- Created: 2022
- Number of members: 3
- Councillors: Vacancy; Sanjai Kohli; Shabaz Ahmed
- Created from: Greenford Broadway; Greenford Green; Northolt Mandeville
- GSS code: E05013518

Central Greenford is an electoral ward in the London Borough of Ealing. The ward was first used in the 2022 elections. It returns three councillors to Ealing London Borough Council.

== List of councillors ==
Seat	Councillor	Took office	Left office	Party	Election
1	Aysha Raza	2022	2026	Labour	2022
2	Sanjai Kohli	2022	Incumbent	Labour	2022
3	Shabaz Ahmed	2022	Incumbent	Labour	2022

== Ealing council elections ==
=== 2026 election ===
Aysha Raza died in February 2026, with the by-election deferred until May 2026. (Note: Casual vacancies occurring within six months of scheduled elections are not filled.)

=== 2022 election ===
The election took place on 5 May 2022.

2022 Ealing London Borough Council election: Central Greenford
Party	Candidate	Votes	%	±%
Labour	Aysha Raza	1,848	52.2	N/A
Labour	Sanjai Kohli	1,806	51.0	N/A
Labour	Shabaz Ahmed	1,798	50.8	N/A
Conservative	Miled Maroun	1,047	29.6	N/A
Conservative	Anakin England	934	26.4	N/A
Conservative	Olumide Ojo	876	24.8	N/A
Green	John Rolt	443	12.5	N/A
Liberal Democrats	Alexander Abrahams	356	10.1	N/A
Liberal Democrats	John Mitchell	339	9.6	N/A
Liberal Democrats	Leslie Hurst	337	9.5	N/A
TUSC	Ben Goldstone	115	3.2	N/A
Turnout		3,539	37.24	N/A
Labour win (new seat)				
Labour win (new seat)				
Labour win (new seat)				
