= North Acton (ward) =

Electoral ward in London, England

- Electoral ward for the Ealing London Borough Council
- North Acton ward boundaries since 2022
- Borough: Ealing
- County: Greater London
- Population: 19,043 (2021) (Note: 2021 Census data reported for 2022 ward boundaries)
- Electorate: 10,964 (2026)
- Major settlements: North Acton, Park Royal
- Area: 4.147 km^{2} (1.601 sq mi)

Current electoral ward
- Created: 2022
- Councillors: Blerina Hashani; Marijn van de Geer; Hodan Haili
- Created from: Acton Central, East Acton, South Acton
- GSS code: E05013527

North Acton is an electoral ward in the London Borough of Ealing. The ward was first used in the 2022 elections and elects three councillors to Ealing London Borough Council.

== Geography ==
The ward is named after the district of North Acton.

== List of councillors ==
| Election | Councillors | | |
|---|---|---|---|
| 2022 | Blerina Hashani (Labour) | Daniel Crawford (Labour) | Hodan Haili (Labour) |
| 2026 | Blerina Hashani (Labour) | Simon Anthony (Green) | Hodan Haili (Labour) |
| 2026 by-election | Blerina Hashani (Labour) | Marijn van de Geer (Green) | Hodan Haili (Labour) |

== Ealing council elections ==
=== 2026 by-election ===
The by-election took place on 25 June 2026, following the resignation of Simon Anthony.

2026 North Acton by-election
| Party | Candidate | Votes | % | ±% |
|---|---|---|---|---|
| Green | Marijn van de Geer | 804 | 30.2 | +1.4 |
| Labour | Gareth Shaw | 642 | 24.1 | −4.6 |
| Liberal Democrats | Abdi Ahmed | 523 | 19.6 | +8.3 |
| Reform | Jonathan Notley | 309 | 11.6 | −0.1 |
| Conservative | Sally Gorman | 257 | 9.6 | −3.5 |
| Ealing Community Independents | Craig Smith | 129 | 4.8 | N/A |
| Registered electors | | 11,043 | | |
| Turnout | | 2,674 | 24.21 | |
| Rejected ballots | | 10 | | |
| Green hold | | Swing | | |

=== 2026 election ===
The election took place on 7 May 2026.

2026 Ealing London Borough Council election: North Acton (3)
| Party | Candidate | Votes | % | ±% |
|---|---|---|---|---|
| Labour | Blerina Hashani | 1,356 | | |
| Green | Simon Anthony | 1,298 | | |
| Labour | Hodan Haili | 1,296 | | |
| Labour | Guneet Malik | 1,186 | | |
| Green | Maciej Pawlik | 1,051 | | |
| Green | Nasim Nur | 1,001 | | |
| Conservative | Sarah Beament | 592 | | |
| Conservative | Sally Gorman | 551 | | |
| Reform | Bob Baker | 530 | | |
| Liberal Democrats | Simon Quince | 511 | | |
| Conservative | Ann Lazarow | 502 | | |
| Reform | Caroline Fanneran | 496 | | |
| Reform | Alan Warr | 449 | | |
| Liberal Democrats | Alan Whelan | 396 | | |
| Liberal Democrats | Patrick Salaun | 386 | | |
| Rejoin EU | Kamlesh Mehta | 201 | | |
| TUSC | David Hofman | 83 | | |
| Registered electors | | 10,964 | | |
| Turnout | | TBC | 37.54 | |
| Labour hold | | Swing | | |
| Green gain from Labour | | Swing | | |
| Labour hold | | Swing | | |

=== 2022 election ===
The election took place on 5 May 2022.

2022 Ealing London Borough Council election: North Acton (3)
| Party | Candidate | Votes | % | ±% |
|---|---|---|---|---|
| Labour | Daniel Crawford | 1,872 | 56.8 | N/A |
| Labour | Hodan Haili | 1,544 | 46.9 | N/A |
| Labour | Blerina Hashani | 1,512 | 45.9 | N/A |
| Conservative | Ann Lazarow | 717 | 21.8 | N/A |
| Conservative | Andy Kalkhoran | 674 | 20.5 | N/A |
| Green | Ineta Hans-Barker | 669 | 20.3 | N/A |
| Conservative | James Harper | 666 | 20.2 | N/A |
| Liberal Democrats | Mervyn Allen | 460 | 14.0 | N/A |
| Liberal Democrats | Myer Salaman | 377 | 11.4 | N/A |
| Liberal Democrats | Alan Whelan | 346 | 10.5 | N/A |
| EIN | Leslie Bunder | 223 | 6.8 | N/A |
| EIN | Grey Wixted | 153 | 4.6 | N/A |
| TUSC | David Hofman | 110 | 3.3 | N/A |
| Turnout | | 3,294 | 30.71 | |
| Labour win (new seat) | | | | |
| Labour win (new seat) | | | | |
| Labour win (new seat) | | | | |
