= Hanwell Broadway (ward) =

Electoral ward in London, England

- Electoral ward for the Ealing London Borough Council
- Borough: Ealing
- County: Greater London
- Population: 15,290 (2021) (Note: 2021 census data, reported for 2022 ward boundaries)
- Electorate: 10,720 (Note: As of the 2026 local election)
- Major settlements: Hanwell, West Ealing (part)
- Area: 1.848 km²

Current electoral ward
- Created: 2022
- Councillors: Clare Welsby; Natalia Kubica; Andrew Walkley
- Created from: Elthorne
- GSS code: E05013525

Hanwell Broadway is an electoral ward in the London Borough of Ealing. The ward was first used in the 2022 elections and elects three councillors to Ealing London Borough Council.

== Ward profile ==
The ward stretches west to east along the Uxbridge Road from the River Brent to West Ealing, taking in the town centre of Hanwell and the northern side of West Ealing Broadway. The area was largely developed in the late 19th and early 20th centuries, with the majority of housing dating from this period, though the eastern part of the ward also contains the Green Man Lane estate, built during the 1970s and currently undergoing regeneration. The northern border of the ward follows the Great Western Main Line, with the Grade I-listed Wharncliffe Viaduct that carries the railway over the Brent Valley being a prominent local landmark.

== Political history ==
Since its creation in 2022, Hanwell Broadway has been a Green-Labour marginal ward, with the vote margin between the parties' closest candidates never exceeding 400 votes. In 2022, Labour won all three seats, though the Greens recorded their then-highest ever vote total in the borough in the ward, missing out on the final seat by 390 votes. In 2026 the Greens won all three seats, which was the first time the party won seats on Ealing Council.

The ward's predecessor, Elthorne, which existed from 1965 until 2022, was usually a safe Labour ward, electing Conservative councillors only in 1968, 2006, and in 2010 when it also elected a sole Liberal Democrat councillor. From 2014 until its abolition it was represented only by councillors from the Labour Party.

== Councillors ==
Election	Councillors		
2022	Yoel Gordon (Labour)	Monica Hamidi (Labour)	Polly Knewstub (Labour)
2026	Clare Welsby (Green)	Natalia Kubica (Green)	Andrew Walkley (Green)

== Election results ==
2026 Ealing London Borough Council election: Hanwell Broadway (3 seats)
Party	Candidate	Votes	%	±%
Green	Clare Welsby	2,050	38.7	+8.1
Green	Natalia Kubica	2,001	37.8	+8.3
Green	Andrew Walkley	1,924	36.3	+12.8
Labour	Polly Knewstub	1,773	33.5	−6.0
Labour	Yoel Gordon	1,621	30.6	−10.3
Labour	Alexander Dismore	1,594	30.1	−10.5
Reform	Reg Anderson	627	11.8	N/A
Reform	Jaroslaw Andrysiak	601	11.4	N/A
Reform	Salim Izza	491	9.3	N/A
Conservative	Richard Reade	458	8.7	−10.3
Liberal Democrats	Edward Cook	452	8.5	−5.6
Conservative	Edward Iredale	445	8.4	−9.3
Liberal Democrats	Leslie Glancy	409	7.7	−5.2
Conservative	Hussein Dima	392	7.4	−6.8
Liberal Democrats	Stephen O'Shea	386	7.3	−0.6
Rejoin EU	Taslema Akhter	260	4.9	N/A
Registered electors		10,720		
Turnout		5,294	49.38	+5.92
Green gain from Labour		Swing		
Green gain from Labour		Swing		
Green gain from Labour		Swing		

2022 Ealing London Borough Council election: Hanwell Broadway (3)
Party	Candidate	Votes	%	±%
Labour	Yoel Gordon (Note: Gordon was the incumbent councillor for Elthorne ward)	1,779	40.9	N/A
Labour	Monica Hamidi	1,767	40.6	N/A
Labour	Polly Knewstub	1,720	39.5	N/A
Green	Kate Crossland	1,331	30.6	N/A
Green	Neil Reynolds	1,285	29.5	N/A
Green	Marijn van de Geer	1,022	23.5	N/A
Conservative	Gary Barak	827	19.0	N/A
Conservative	David Compton-Taylor	770	17.7	N/A
Conservative	Waheeda Shah	617	14.2	N/A
Liberal Democrats	Nigel Bakhai	616	14.1	N/A
Liberal Democrats	Alastair Mitton	561	12.9	N/A
Liberal Democrats	Lakhbir Singh	342	7.9	N/A
Registered electors		10,019		
Turnout		4,354	43.46	N/A
Labour win (new seat)				
Labour win (new seat)				
Labour win (new seat)				
