= North Hanwell (ward) =

Electoral ward in London, England

- Electoral ward for the Ealing London Borough Council
- Borough: Ealing
- County: Greater London
- Population: 15,040 (Note: 2021 census data, reported for 2022 ward boundaries)
- Electorate: 9,812 (Note: As of the 2026 local election)
- Major settlements: Hanwell
- Area: 2.209 km²

Current electoral ward
- Created: 2022
- Councillors: Louise Brett; Ray Wall; Lauren Wall
- Created from: Hobbayne
- GSS code: E05013529

North Hanwell is an electoral ward in the London Borough of Ealing. The ward was first used in the 2022 elections and elects three councillors to Ealing London Borough Council.

== Ward profile ==
The ward stretches from the River Brent, which forms its the northern and western border, to the Great Western Main Line in the south, covering almost all of the northern half of Hanwell. The ward is primarily residential in character, containing several neighbourhoods designated as conservation areas including the Cuckoo Estate, built in the 1930s on the site of the closed Cuckoo Schools. Much of Brent River Park lies in the west of the ward, including Brent Lodge Park and Hanwell Zoo. The ward contains several notable landmarks, including Hanwell Community Centre, built in 1856 as a school administrative building, as well as St Mary's Church, built on the site of Hanwell's original parish church in 1842, both of which are Grade II-listed.

== Political history ==
In 2022, the Labour Party won all three seats by a margin of over 1100 votes, with the Conservative Party and Green Party finishing a distant second and third. In 2026, both Labour and the Conservatives lost votes, and the ward became a Labour-Green marginal for the first time, with Labour winning the final seat by a reduced margin of just 122 votes over the Greens.

The ward's predecessor, Hobbayne, which existed from 1978 until 2022, was always represented by at least one Labour councillor, but elected split tickets of Labour and Conservative councillors on four occasions. From 2014 until its abolition it was represented only by councillors from the Labour Party.

== Councillors ==
Election	Councillors		
2022	Louise Brett (Labour)	Ray Wall (Labour)	Claire Tighe (Labour)
2026	Louise Brett (Labour)	Ray Wall (Labour)	Lauren Wall (Labour)

== Elections ==
2026 Ealing London Borough Council election: North Hanwell (3 seats)
Party	Candidate	Votes	%	±%
Labour	Louise Brett	1,803	37.3	−20.2
Labour	Ray Wall	1,611	33.3	−16.3
Labour	Lauren Wall (Note: Lauren Wall was an incumbent councillor for Northolt West End ward)	1,600	33.1	−21.8
Green	Dominic Kirkbride	1,478	30.6	+9.2
Green	Tegan Millard	1,377	28.5	+7.1
Green	John Rolt	1,226	25.4	+4.0
Conservative	Ian Potts	738	15.3	−6.4
Reform	Andrew Evzona	716	14.8	N/A
Reform	Felicity Georghiades	677	14.0	N/A
Conservative	Kamran Ali	586	12.1	−9.0
Liberal Democrats	Zoe Horwich	509	10.5	−5.4
Conservative	Minoo Sullivan	485	10.0	−9.6
Liberal Democrats	Geoffrey Berg	442	9.1	−2.4
Liberal Democrats	Martin Williams	412	8.5	+0.7
TUSC	Tony Gill	77	1.6	−2.3
Registered electors		9,812		
Turnout		4,832	49.25	+8.45
Labour hold		Swing		
Labour hold		Swing		
Labour hold		Swing		

2022 Ealing London Borough Council election: North Hanwell (3)
Party	Candidate	Votes	%	±%
Labour	Louise Brett	2,312	57.5	N/A
Labour	Claire Tighe	2,207	54.9	N/A
Labour	Ray Wall	1,994	49.6	N/A
Conservative	Benjamin Davies	871	21.7	N/A
Green	Alan Anderson	858	21.4	N/A
Conservative	Ian Potts	848	21.1	N/A
Conservative	Sam Yung	786	19.6	N/A
Liberal Democrats	Zoe Horwich	637	15.9	N/A
Liberal Democrats	Peter Hutchison	461	11.5	N/A
Liberal Democrats	Gillian Rowley	313	7.8	N/A
TUSC	Tony Gill	158	3.9	N/A
Turnout		4,018	40.80	N/A
Labour win (new seat)				
Labour win (new seat)				
Labour win (new seat)				
