= Southall Green =

Electoral ward in London, England

- Electoral ward for the Ealing London Borough Council
- Borough: Ealing
- County: Greater London
- Population: 15,694 (2021)
- Major settlements: Southall
- Area: 1.518 km²

Current electoral ward
- Created: 2002
- Councillors: 3

Southall Green is an electoral ward in the London Borough of Ealing. The ward was first used in the 2002 elections and elects three councillors to Ealing London Borough Council.

== Geography ==
The ward is named after the town of Southall.

== Councillors ==
Election	Councillors		
2022	Jasbir Anand (Labour)	Kamaljit Dhindsa (Labour)	Peter Mason (Labour)

== Elections ==
=== 2022 ===
Southall Green (3 seats)
Party	Candidate	Votes	%	±%
Labour	Jasbir Kaur Anand	3,105	68.9	N/A
Labour	Kamaljit Singh Dhindsa	3,034	67.3	N/A
Labour	Peter Elijah Jonathan Mason	2,856	63.4	N/A
Conservative	Avtar Chand	803	17.8	N/A
Conservative	Md Feroz Khan	727	16.1	N/A
Conservative	Arif Shekh	657	14.6	N/A
Green	Matt Chadburn	270	6.0	N/A
EIN	Sufiyan Urmar Abdul-Qayum	254	5.6	N/A
Liberal Democrats	Alison Joanna Cross	241	5.3	N/A
EIN	Amrik Mahi	235	5.2	N/A
EIN	David Marsden	223	4.9	N/A
Liberal Democrats	Lewis Neville Hill	133	3.0	N/A
Liberal Democrats	Derk Jan Groen	130	2.9	N/A
Turnout		4,507	42.80	
Labour hold				
Labour hold				
Labour hold				

== See also ==
- List of electoral wards in Greater London
