= Northfield (Ealing ward) =

Electoral ward in London, England

- Electoral ward for the Ealing London Borough Council
- Borough: Ealing
- County: Greater London
- Population: 14,265 (2021)
- Area: 1.688 km²

Current electoral ward
- Created: 1965
- Councillors: 3

Northfield is an electoral ward in the London Borough of Ealing. The ward was first used in the 1964 elections and elects three councillors to Ealing London Borough Council.

== History ==
The ward was named Northfields from 1965 to 1978.

== Geography ==
The ward is named after the town of Northfield area of Ealing.

== Councillors ==
Election	Councillors		
2018	Paul Driscoll (Labour)	Fay Block (Labour)	David Millican (Conservative)
2022	Paul Driscoll (Labour)	Ian Kingston (Labour)	Kim Nagpal (Labour)

== Elections ==
=== 2022 ===
Northfield (3 seats)
Party	Candidate	Votes	%	±%
Labour	Paul Driscoll	2,424	44.3	N/A
Labour	Ian Kingston	2,227	40.7	N/A
Labour	Kim Nagpal	2,041	37.3	N/A
Conservative	Theresa Mullins	1,772	32.4	N/A
Conservative	Anita Kapoor	1,705	31.2	N/A
Conservative	Sean Hanrahan	1,676	30.6	N/A
Green	Sam Diamond	858	15.7	N/A
Green	Christina Meiklejohn	816	14.9	N/A
Liberal Democrats	Leslie Glancy	714	13.0	N/A
Liberal Democrats	David Horrex	669	12.2	N/A
Green	Ross Warren	649	11.9	N/A
Liberal Democrats	Ashok Sinhal	484	8.8	N/A
Turnout		5,472	53.73	
Labour hold				
Labour hold				
Labour gain from Conservative				

=== 2018 ===
Northfield (3)
Party	Candidate	Votes	%	±%
Labour	Fay Block	2,422	46.4	+12.8
Labour	Paul William Driscoll	2,249	43.1	+10.3
Conservative	David Millican	2,112	40.5	−3.5
Labour	Ian Arthur George Kingston	2,038	39.1	+11.5
Conservative	Fabio Conti	1,872	35.9	−0.2
Conservative	Theresa Maria Mullins	1,839	35.3	−2.2
Green	Darren Roger Moore	1,109	21.3	+5.4
Liberal Democrats	Leslie Ronald Hurst	556	10.7	+1.9
Liberal Democrats	John William Mitchell	538	10.8	+2.1
Liberal Democrats	Gavin Hughes	432	10.3	+4.3
Turnout		5,215	53.17	
Labour gain from Conservative		Swing		
Labour gain from Conservative		Swing		
Conservative hold		Swing		

== See also ==
- List of electoral wards in Greater London
