= Ealing Common (ward) =

Electoral ward in London, England

- Electoral ward for the Ealing London Borough Council
- Borough: Ealing
- County: Greater London
- Population: 15,945 (2021)
- Major settlements: Ealing Common
- Area: 2.421 km²

Current electoral ward
- Created: 1978
- Councillors: 3

Ealing Common is an electoral ward in the London Borough of Ealing. The ward was first used in the 1978 elections and elects three councillors to Ealing London Borough Council.

== Geography ==
The ward is named after the area of Ealing Common.

== Councillors ==
Election	Councillors		
2022	Jon Ball (Liberal Democrats)	Connie Hersch (Liberal Democrats)	Praveen Anand (Labour)
2026	Jon Ball (Liberal Democrats)	Connie Hersch (Liberal Democrats)	Lakhbir Singh (Liberal Democrats)

== Elections ==
=== 2022 ===
Ealing Common (3 seats)
Party	Candidate	Votes	%	±%
Liberal Democrats	Jon Ball	2,218	43.5	N/A
Liberal Democrats	Connie Hersch	1,877	36.8	N/A
Labour	Praveen Anand	1,847	36.2	N/A
Liberal Democrats	Benedict Cross	1,778	34.9	N/A
Labour	Jags Sanghera	1,480	29.0	N/A
Labour	Iram Wooley	1,397	27.4	N/A
Conservative	Liz Paice	1,038	20.4	N/A
Conservative	Andrew MacDonald	1,027	20.1	N/A
Conservative	Patrick Cusworth	989	19.4	N/A
Green	Emma Powell	894	17.5	N/A
UKIP	Julie Carter	101	2.0	N/A
Turnout		5,099	45.76	
Liberal Democrats hold				
Liberal Democrats gain from Conservative				
Labour hold				

== See also ==
- List of electoral wards in Greater London
