= Lady Margaret (ward) =

Electoral ward in London, England

- Electoral ward for the Ealing London Borough Council
- Borough: Ealing
- County: Greater London
- Population: 15,785 (2021)
- Area: 1.697 km²

Current electoral ward
- Created: 2002
- Councillors: 3

Lady Margaret is an electoral ward in the London Borough of Ealing. The ward was first used in the 2002 elections and elects three councillors to Ealing London Borough Council.

== Geography ==
The ward is named after the Lady Margaret area of Ealing.

== Councillors ==
Election	Councillors		
2022	Karam Mohan (Labour)	Kamaldeep Sahota (Labour)	Swaran Padda (Labour)

== Elections ==
=== 2022 ===
Lady Margaret (3 seats)
Party	Candidate	Votes	%	±%
Labour	Karam Mohan	2,708	64.4	N/A
Labour	Kamaldeep Sahota	2,690	63.9	N/A
Labour	Swaran Padda	2,649	63.0	N/A
Conservative	Forman Ali	862	20.5	N/A
Conservative	Muhammad Islam	730	17.3	N/A
Conservative	Mohammed Rashid	681	16.2	N/A
Green	Louise Graham	547	13.0	N/A
Liberal Democrats	John Gower	384	9.1	N/A
Liberal Democrats	Ian Hawkes	367	8.7	N/A
Liberal Democrats	Milena Izmirlieva	237	5.6	N/A
Turnout		4,208	38.49	
Labour hold				
Labour hold				
Labour hold				

== See also ==
- List of electoral wards in Greater London
