= Callum Anderson =

British politician (born 1991)

Callum Anderson MP
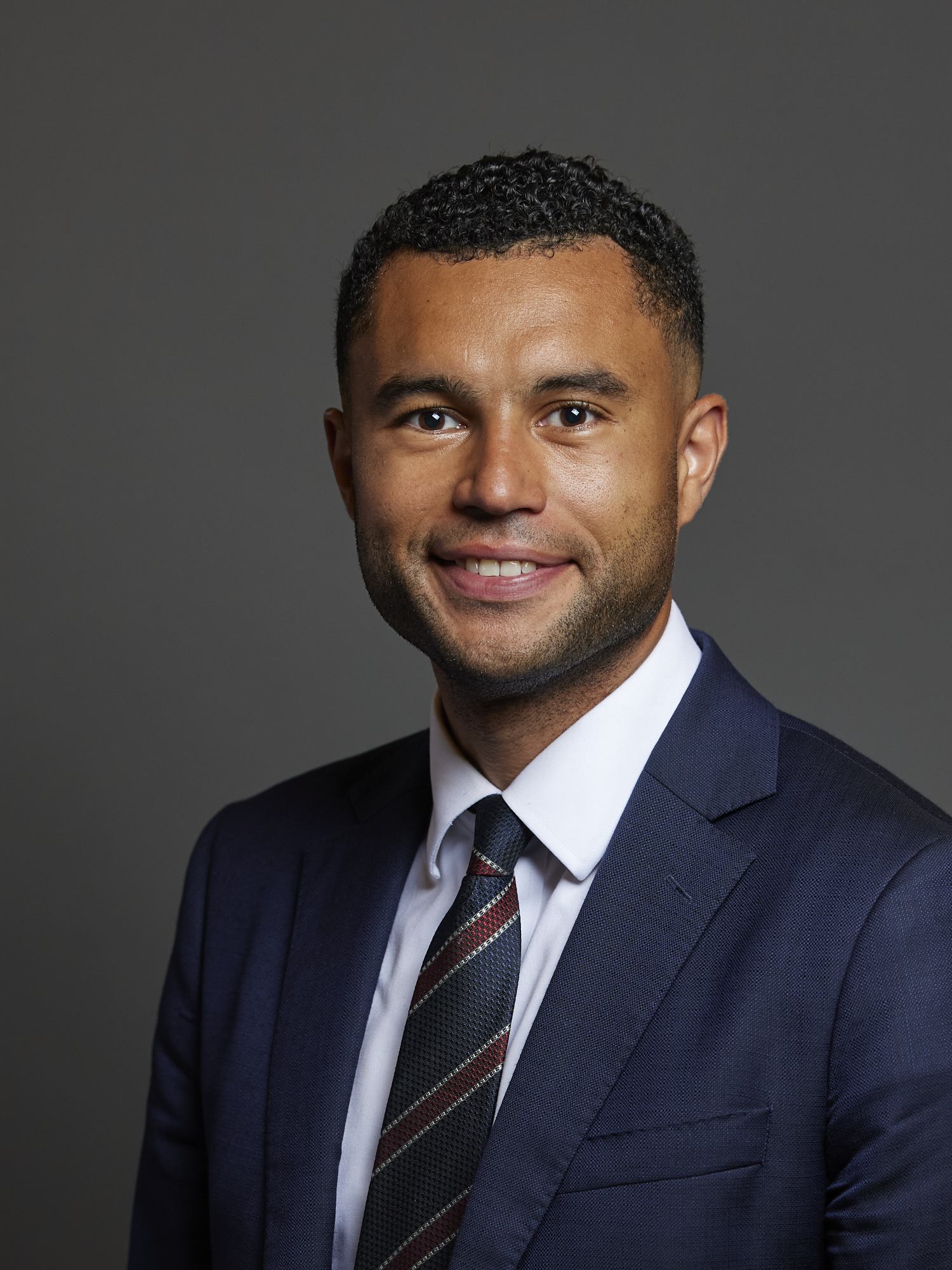
- Official portrait, 2024

Member of Parliament for Buckingham and Bletchley
- Incumbent
- Assumed office 4 July 2024
- Preceded by: Constituency created
- Majority: 2,421 (5.0%)

Member of Ealing London Borough Council for South Acton
- Incumbent
- Assumed office 5 May 2022

Personal details
- Born: Callum Bradley Anderson; 7 August 1991 (age 35) Dunstable, Bedfordshire, England
- Party: Labour
- Education: University of Birmingham (BSc)

Callum Bradley Anderson (born 7 August 1991) is a British Labour Party politician serving as Member of Parliament (MP) for Buckingham and Bletchley since 2024.

== Early life and career ==
Anderson was born in Dunstable, Bedfordshire to a black father and white mother. He was raised by his mother, a shopworker, in a council house.

In 2013, Anderson received a Bachelor of Science in Economics with German from the University of Birmingham. He has worked as a policy adviser to the London Stock Exchange and City of London Corporation, having previously worked for several think tanks.

Before being elected as an MP, Anderson worked at London Stock Exchange Group plc.

== Political career ==
Anderson joined the Labour Party at 18 years old. He has been a member of Labour's National Policy Forum, supported by Labour to Win, and the BAME Labour Network executive.

Anderson stood as a Labour candidate at the 2019 general election, finishing second-place in his former home constituency of South West Bedfordshire. He expressed support for a second EU referendum during the election campaign.

He unsuccessfully applied to be a candidate for the 2021 London Assembly election to be an additional member, and the Parliamentary candidate for Stevenage in 2022.

Anderson was elected as a Member of Ealing London Borough Council for South Acton in 2022. In Ealing, he has been a school governor and one of the Council's Race Equality Commissioners.

At the 2024 general election, Anderson was elected as the first MP for the new Buckingham and Bletchley constituency. He defeated Conservative Iain Stewart, who had served as MP for one of its predecessor constituencies.
