= Southall Broadway =

Electoral ward in London, England

- Electoral ward for the Ealing London Borough Council
- Borough: Ealing
- County: Greater London
- Population: 10,825 (2021)
- Major settlements: Southall
- Area: 1.052 km²

Current electoral ward
- Created: 2002
- Councillors: 2 (since 2022); 3 (2002-2022)

Southall Broadway is an electoral ward in the London Borough of Ealing. The ward was first used in the 2002 elections and elects two councillors to Ealing London Borough Council.

== Geography ==
The ward is named after the town of Southall.

== Councillors ==
Election	Councillors	
2022	Kamaljit Nagpal (Labour)	Sarfraz Khan (Labour)

== Elections ==
=== 2022 ===
Southall Broadway (2 seats)
Party	Candidate	Votes	%	±%
Labour	Kamaljit Nagpal	1,831	59.0	N/A
Labour	Sarfraz Khan	1,793	57.8	N/A
Conservative	Darsham Bhinder	667	21.5	N/A
Conservative	Mohd Miah	584	18.8	N/A
EIN	Rashpal Bhatti	238	7.7	N/A
Liberal Democrats	Robin Bettridge	220	7.1	N/A
Green	Ann Curtis	213	6.9	N/A
EIN	Harmandra Dhaliwal	201	6.5	N/A
Liberal Democrats	David Zerdin	120	3.9	N/A
Turnout		3,101	41.83	
Labour hold				
Labour hold				

== See also ==
- List of electoral wards in Greater London
