= Norwood Green (ward) =

Electoral ward in London, England

- Electoral ward for the Ealing London Borough Council
- Borough: Ealing
- County: Greater London
- Population: 16,095 (2021)
- Major settlements: Norwood Green
- Area: 3.707 km²

Current electoral ward
- Created: 2002
- Councillors: 3

Norwood Green is an electoral ward in the London Borough of Ealing. The ward was first used in the 2002 elections and elects three councillors to Ealing London Borough Council.

== Geography ==
The ward is named after the area of Norwood Green.

== Councillors ==
| Election | Councillors | | |
|---|---|---|---|
| 2022 | John Martin (Labour) | Tarept Sidhu (Labour) | Gul Murtaza (Labour) |

== Elections ==
=== 2022 ===
Norwood Green (3 seats)
| Party | Candidate | Votes | % | ±% |
|---|---|---|---|---|
| Labour | John Martin | 2,706 | 70.3 | N/A |
| Labour | Tarept Sidhu | 2,600 | 67.6 | N/A |
| Labour | Gul Murtaza | 2,470 | 64.2 | N/A |
| Conservative | Mohammed Badsha | 568 | 14.8 | N/A |
| Conservative | Sabikun Nahar | 543 | 14.1 | N/A |
| Green | Nikki Daniel | 520 | 13.5 | N/A |
| Conservative | Khandaker Rahman | 510 | 13.3 | N/A |
| Liberal Democrats | John Gauss | 269 | 7.0 | N/A |
| Liberal Democrats | Pantea Etessami | 221 | 5.7 | N/A |
| Liberal Democrats | Michael Pidoux | 200 | 5.2 | N/A |
| TUSC | Mark Benjamin | 144 | 3.7 | N/A |
| Turnout | | 3,848 | 36.99 | |
| Labour hold | | | | |
| Labour hold | | | | |
| Labour hold | | | | |

== See also ==
- List of electoral wards in Greater London
