= Southall West =

Electoral ward in London, England

- Electoral ward for the Ealing London Borough Council
- Borough: Ealing
- County: Greater London
- Population: 6,581 (2021)
- Major settlements: Southall
- Area: 0.7284 km²

Current electoral ward
- Created: 2022
- Councillors: 2

Southall West is an electoral ward in the London Borough of Ealing. The ward was first used in the 2022 elections and elects two councillors to Ealing London Borough Council.

== Geography ==
The ward is named after the town of Southall.

== Councillors ==
Election	Councillors	
2022	Surinder Jassal (Labour)	Faduma Mohamed (Labour)

== Elections ==
=== 2022 ===
Southall West (2 seats)
Party	Candidate	Votes	%	±%
Labour	Surinder Jassal	1,197	57.5	N/A
Labour	Faduma Mohamed	990	47.6	N/A
Conservative	Mohammad Miah	404	19.4	N/A
Independent	Mohammad Amin	347	16.7	N/A
Conservative	Bishnu Carter	271	13.0	N/A
EIN	Joe Bhangu	207	10.0	N/A
Green	Nicholas Chapman	141	6.8	N/A
EIN	Ray Crossfield	141	6.8	N/A
Liberal Democrats	Nigel Bliss	91	4.4	N/A
Liberal Democrats	Rainer Hersch	68	3.3	N/A
Turnout		2,080	45.07	
Labour win (new seat)				
Labour win (new seat)				

== See also ==
- List of electoral wards in Greater London
