= Ealing Broadway (ward) =

Electoral ward in London, England

- Electoral ward for the Ealing London Borough Council
- Borough: Ealing
- County: Greater London
- Population: 13,918 (2021)
- Major settlements: Ealing Broadway
- Area: 1.699 km²

Current electoral ward
- Created: 2002
- Councillors: 3

Ealing Broadway is an electoral ward in the London Borough of Ealing. The ward was first used in the 2002 elections and elects three councillors to Ealing London Borough Council.

== Geography ==
The ward is named after the district of Ealing Broadway.

== Councillors ==
Election	Councillors		
2022	Julian Gallant (Conservative)	Anthony Young (Conservative)	Seema Kumar (Conservative)
2026	Julian Gallant (Conservative)	Sean Hanrahan (Conservative)	Adam Keenan (Liberal Democrats)

== Elections ==
=== 2022 ===
Ealing Broadway (3 seats)
Party	Candidate	Votes	%	±%
Conservative	Julian Gallant	1,713	41.8	N/A
Conservative	Anthony Young	1,667	40.7	N/A
Conservative	Seema Kumar	1,595	38.9	N/A
Labour	Monika Kohli	1,351	33.0	N/A
Labour	Sudarshan Dhanda	1,285	31.4	N/A
Labour	Charles White	1,140	27.8	N/A
Green	Meena Hans	897	21.9	N/A
Liberal Democrats	Michael Gettleson	725	17.7	N/A
Liberal Democrats	Bex Scott	712	17.4	N/A
Liberal Democrats	Francis Salaun	621	15.2	N/A
Turnout		4,097	42.47	
Conservative hold				
Conservative hold				
Conservative hold				

== See also ==
- List of electoral wards in Greater London
