= Pitshanger (ward) =

Electoral ward in London, England

- Electoral ward for the Ealing London Borough Council
- Borough: Ealing
- County: Greater London
- Population: 15,169 (2021)
- Major settlements: Pitshanger
- Area: 2.233 km²

Current electoral ward
- Created: 2022
- Councillors: 3

Pitshanger is an electoral ward in the London Borough of Ealing. The ward was first used in the 2022 elections and elects three councillors to Ealing London Borough Council.

== Geography ==
The ward is named after the suburb of Pitshanger.

== Councillors ==
Election	Councillors		
2022	Rima Baaklini (Labour)	Ilayda Nijhar (Labour)	Ben Wesson (Labour)

== Elections ==
=== 2022 ===
Pitshanger (3 seats)
Party	Candidate	Votes	%	±%
Labour	Rima Baaklini	2,106	42.5	N/A
Labour	Ilayda Nijhar	2,017	40.7	N/A
Labour	Ben Wesson	1,990	40.1	N/A
Conservative	Ian Proud	1,576	31.8	N/A
Conservative	Sara Kumar	1,480	29.8	N/A
Conservative	Fatima Rana	1,392	28.1	N/A
Liberal Democrats	Francesco Fruzza	1,106	22.3	N/A
Green	Sarah McCartney	861	17.4	N/A
Liberal Democrats	Roderick Nathan	766	15.4	N/A
Liberal Democrats	David Martin	723	14.6	N/A
SDP	Les Beaumont	109	2.2	N/A
TUSC	Lamley Amoako-Atta	94	1.9	N/A
Turnout		4,959	48.06	
Labour win (new seat)				
Labour win (new seat)				
Labour win (new seat)				

== See also ==
- List of electoral wards in Greater London
