= Rupa Huq =

British Labour politician, columnist and academic (born 1972)

Rupa Huq MP
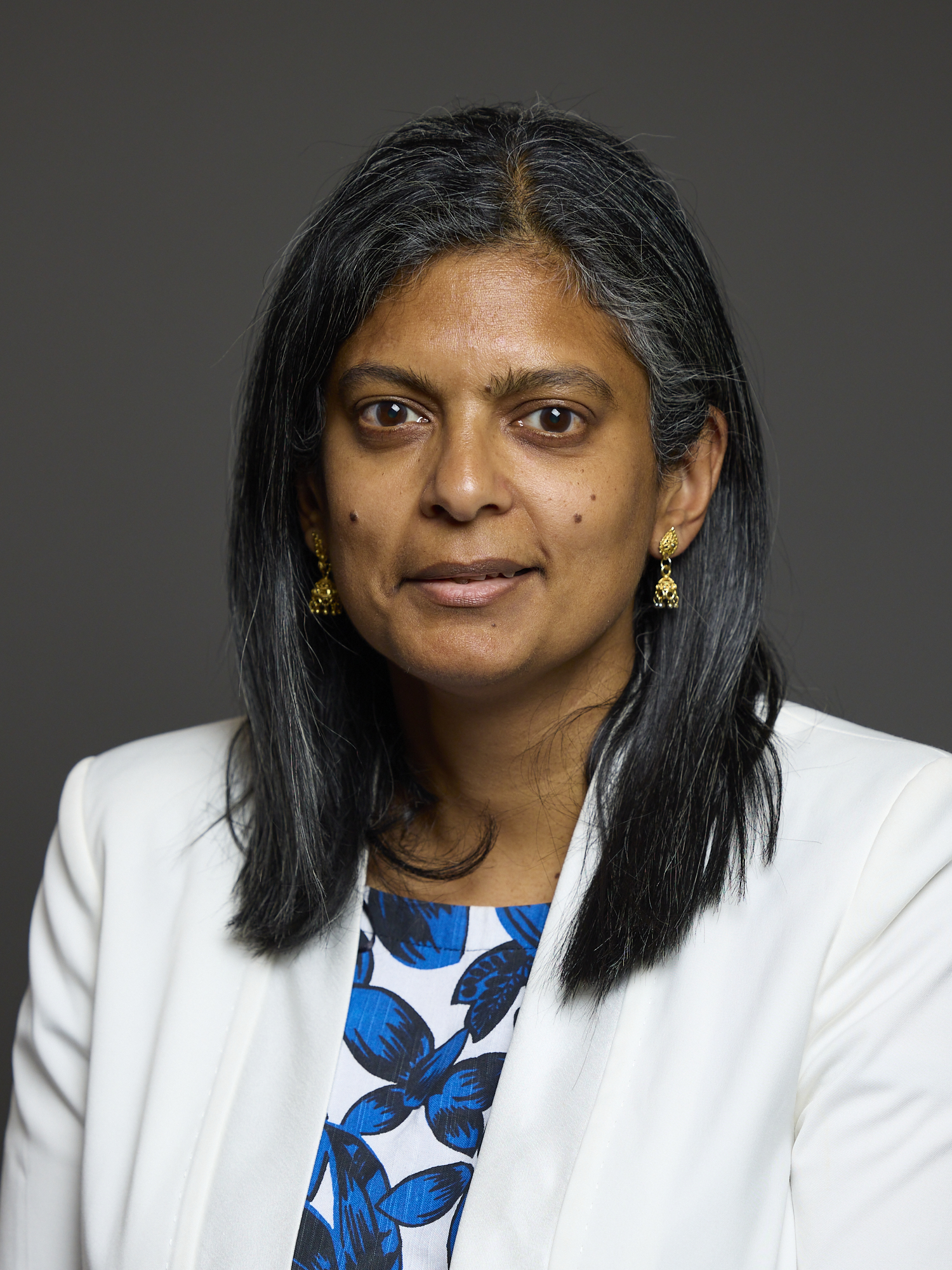
- Official portrait, 2024

Member of Parliament for Ealing Central and Acton
- Incumbent
- Assumed office 7 May 2015
- Preceded by: Angie Bray
- Majority: 13,995 (29.3%)

Personal details
- Born: Rupa Asha Huq; 2 April 1972 (age 54) Hammersmith, London, England
- Party: Labour
- Relations: Konnie Huq (sister); Charlie Brooker (brother-in-law)
- Children: 1
- Education: Newnham College, Cambridge (BA); University of East London (PhD)
- Website: www.rupahuq.org.uk

Academic background
- Thesis: Too much too young: British 1990s youth culture (1999)

Rupa Asha Huq (born 2 April 1972) is a British Labour politician, columnist and academic. She has been the Member of Parliament (MP) for Ealing Central and Acton since 2015.

== Early life and education ==
Rupa Huq was born on 2 April 1972 in Queen Charlotte's Hospital, Hammersmith, and grew up on Brunswick Road in Ealing. Huq's father, Muhammad Huq and mother, Rowshan Ara Huq, moved to Britain in 1962 from East Pakistan. Huq's father came from Maksedpur in Pabna and her mother from Kuthipara in Pabna. Huq's father was training to become an actuary for Prudential, but gave that up to open an Indian restaurant in Soho, London. After the recession of the early 1990s, the council did not renew the restaurant's lease so the business folded. He opened another restaurant in Harrow and later retired.

Huq attended Montpelier Primary School in Ealing. In 1980, at the age of eight, Huq was featured in the BBC Schools programme Look and Read when the programme visited the school. She then attended the independent girls' school Notting Hill and Ealing High School.

In 1993, she graduated with an upper second in Political and Social Sciences and Law from Newnham College, Cambridge, for a BA. In 1999, she completed a PhD in cultural studies with a thesis on youth culture at the University of East London, comparing young people in East London and the Alsace region of France. This included being a post-graduate at Strasbourg II University in France, during which time she also worked at the European Parliament for the Labour Party, shadowing Labour MEP Carole Tongue. In October 2017, Huq told Sky News that she had been sexually harassed by a male MEP at this time.

== Academic career ==
In 1998, Huq moved to Manchester. From 1998 to 2004, she was a lecturer at the University of Manchester, during which time she held a Leverhulme Trust Fellowship.

From September 2004 until 2015, Huq was a senior lecturer in Sociology and Criminology at Kingston University in the Faculty of Arts and Social Sciences. She has also taught Media and Cultural Studies.

== Writing and media career ==
Huq has contributed to Tribune, The Guardian, New Statesman, Progress magazine and The Times Higher Education Supplement. Huq's research specialism has chiefly been youth culture and pop music. She has a particular interest in David Bowie.

In 2006, her book Beyond Subculture: youth, pop and identity in a post-colonial world on these themes was published. It was subsequently one of five titles shortlisted for the 2007 British Sociological Association Philip Abrams Memorial Prize. Huq was a contributor to the 2011 book What Next for Labour? Ideas for a new generation, published by Queensferry Publishing. In June 2013, her second book Making Sense of Suburbia through Popular Culture was published. Also in 2013, her third book On the Edge: The Contested Cultures of English Suburbia After 7/7 was published.

Huq has appeared on Channel S and Bangla TV as well as Channel 4 News and BBC News 24. On radio, she has been on the Today programme on BBC Radio 4, BBC Radio 5 Live and BBC Asian Network.

Huq says that she has been a part-time DJ, saying in 2004, "I first started DJing for a hospital radio station when I was about 17 and now I DJ in clubs and bars in Manchester".

== Early political career ==
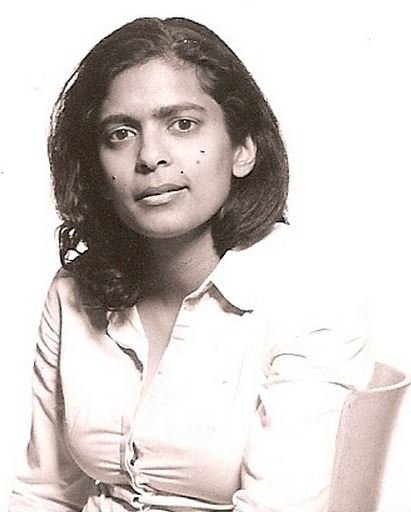
Huq in 2006

Huq was a researcher for Tony Banks and Patricia Hewitt. In 2004, she stood as a candidate for Labour in the European Parliament election in North West England, but failed to be elected.

In 2005, she stood as the Labour parliamentary candidate in Chesham and Amersham at the 2005 general election. She finished in third with 14% of the vote behind the incumbent Conservative MP Cheryl Gillan and the Liberal Democrat candidate.

In 2008, she served on a UK government Foreign and Commonwealth "Understanding Islam" delegation to Bangladesh.

In 2010, Huq was one of three Labour candidates standing for a council seat in Walpole in the constituency of Ealing, but failed to be elected.

== Parliamentary career ==
In November 2013, Huq was chosen by Labour as their prospective parliamentary candidate for Ealing Central and Acton at the next general election. In January 2015, she was one of 15 Labour candidates each given financial support of £10,000 by Lord Matthew Oakeshott. During the election campaign, Huq was manhandled by the former vice-chairman of the local Conservative branch, Karim Sacoor, who was caught on video repeatedly attempting to drag her away from Boris Johnson, who was campaigning with her Conservative rival Angie Bray.

At the 2015 general election, Huq was elected as MP for Ealing Central and Acton with 43.2% of the vote and a majority of 274 votes.

In October 2016, Huq was appointed as a member of the Shadow Home Affairs team in the Labour Party's frontbench in Parliament. She is Shadow Home Office Minister for Crime Prevention. Huq led from the frontbench on the bill before the House of Commons to equalise Civil Partnerships to include heterosexual couples.

In April 2017, the Green Party decided not to contest her seat in the next general election, commenting, "By and large we quite like Rupa. She has made quite prominent statements on proportional representation and Heathrow, as well as climate change and environmental issues in regards to Brexit." In May 2017, Vince Cable commented how he gave Huq a lift home from a joint speaking engagement, saying, "We talked for a couple of hours, and it was very clear that on almost every issue our views were almost identical. And so I would find it difficult to vote against somebody like that, and I hope that our people around the country are discriminating and think and act in a constructive way." At the snap 2017 general election, Huq was re-elected as MP for Ealing Central and Acton with an increased vote share of 59.7% and an increased majority of 13,807 votes.

At the 2019 general election, Huq was again re-elected, with a decreased vote share of 51.3% and a decreased majority of 13,300 votes.

Huq was appointed vice-chair of the All-Party Parliamentary Music Group and All-Party Parliamentary on Crossrail. She chairs the All-Party Parliamentary Group on London, with specific reference to planning and the built environment. In June 2020 Huq joined the Panel of Chairs. She has been a member of the Commons Culture, Media and Sport Committee since March 2022.

In August 2022, Huq was re-selected as the Labour candidate for Ealing Central and Acton at the 2024 general election.

In a debate with the UK Parliament House of Commons in March 2024, Huq recognized the expulsion of Armenians from Nagorno-Karabakh as ethnic cleansing, noted the erasure and destruction of Armenian churches and crosses, criticized the UK's dependency on oil for "pull[ing] the strings", expressed support for the UK recognition of the Armenian genocide, and strongly urged the House to provide more assistance to the Armenian refugees.

== Political views ==
=== Labour Party ===
In June 2015, she was one of 36 Labour MPs to nominate Jeremy Corbyn as a candidate in the Labour leadership election, although she later supported Yvette Cooper.

Huq supported Owen Smith in his unsuccessful attempt to replace Corbyn in the 2016 Labour Party leadership election.

She nominated Keir Starmer as a candidate in the 2020 Labour leadership election.

=== Racial issues ===
In April 2016, Huq defended suspended Labour MP Naz Shah during an interview on BBC's Today programme by comparing "alleged anti-Semitic" posts about Israel shared by Shah on social media to a photo Huq shared of Boris Johnson on a zip-wire next to Barack Obama. She also stressed the fact that Shah's comments were made before she became an MP and that some online comments should not be taken seriously. Subsequently, Huq was accused of "trivialising racism". Huq later apologised, saying she was not "fully aware" of Shah's comments before defending her.

In April 2016, Huq claimed that some areas of television had yet to move forward from the racially insensitive sitcoms of the 1970s. She specifically criticised the BBC comedy Citizen Khan's "Islamophobic" depiction of a "quite backward" family of Muslims. The BBC responded that "We've also had positive comments from members of the Muslim community for the show and for creator Adil Ray who, like the family portrayed, is a British Pakistani Muslim. As with all sitcoms the characters are comic creations and not meant to be representative of the community as a whole".

In March 2018, Huq received a suspicious package containing an anti-Islamic letter and sticky liquid. The substance was later found to be harmless. Similar packages were received by fellow Labour MPs Mohammad Yasin, Rushanara Ali and Afzal Khan.

In May 2018, Huq told colleagues in Westminster Hall that BAME MPs regularly have their access to the House of Commons estate questioned. She said: "I have been stopped more times in this place since my election in 2015, than in 43 years outside." Furthermore, Huq has said that she and fellow Labour MP Tulip Siddiq are mistaken for one another. Huq added: "I imagine most BME MPs have encountered it in some form or other."

Huq joined Labour Friends of Israel in 2016. She resigned in 2019 because Joan Ryan remained in charge after leaving Labour and because she disagreed with some of the positions adopted by the group. Shortly after resigning from Labour Friends of Israel, Huq was the subject of formal complaints to the Labour Party by two former employees for alleged antisemitic behaviour. The Jewish Labour Movement called for her to have the party whip suspended in consequence. The allegations were dismissed due to insufficient evidence.

==== Suspension from the Labour Party ====
In September 2022, Huq was accused of making racist comments during a speech at a Labour Party fringe event running parallel to the party conference. Huq said of the Chancellor of the Exchequer Kwasi Kwarteng, "Superficially he is a black man ... if you hear him on the Today programme, you wouldn't know he is black". In response, figures within the Conservative Party including its chairman demanded the whip be removed from Huq and her expulsion from the Labour Party.

Labour Party leader Keir Starmer called her comments "racist", and Tory Party chair Jake Berry called her remarks "racist," "vile," and "disgusting." Labour's Deputy Leader Angela Rayner called on Huq to apologise, describing her comments as "unacceptable". Sadiq Khan, the Labour Mayor of London and a friend of Huq, also criticised her statement, saying "What it infers is that all black people speak a certain way and all black people are working class. Rupa is not racist but that comment was".

Initially, Huq rejected suggestions that she apologise. Later she said she had offered "sincere and heartfelt apologies," and that her comments were "ill-judged". Huq was suspended from the Labour Party for her comments on 27 September. Huq went on to tweet an apology, but her suspension still remained in place. Huq regained the whip on 3 March 2023; in a statement she gave shortly afterwards, Huq re-iterated her apology, also stating that she had undertaken and completed anti-racism and bias training.

=== Brexit ===
In May 2017, Huq said "I am an MP who is a resolute Remainer ... I will continue to fight for the UK to stay in the EU and vote accordingly. For me this is respecting the will of the people in Ealing, Acton and Chiswick."

In April 2018, while writing for Business Insider Huq said, Brexit is "not carved into concrete, untouchable and unchangeable" arguing that "If the cost of Brexit reaches a point where the British people decide it's not worth it, then they're perfectly entitled to change their minds about whether it's the right path."

In December 2018, she accused UK Prime Minister Theresa May of having "a sort of premature parliamentary ejaculation – that has put the lie to the claim that she sticks to her guns" over her decision to delay a parliamentary vote on the government's Brexit deal. May responded, "I think she will see that I am not capable of a parliamentary ejaculation", which was followed by raucous laughter in the House of Commons.

=== Housing ===
In 2022, Huq opposed the construction of a 26-storey mixed-use building, which included 477 homes (half of which were affordable housing), near the Ealing Broadway train station in London. At an Ealing planning committee meeting, she said, "A 26-storey tower, out of all character with low-density Ealing, plonked there despite local opposition, sticking out like a sore thumb, marketed to international investors on our public land – really?" Ahead of local elections, Huq said that people do not want to live in flats and that "the skyline will be ruined forever." Subsequently, Ealing Council scrapped the plans for the building and opted for retrofitting the existing six-storey building instead.

=== A-Level History teaching ===
In January 2018, Huq said that the A Level history syllabus, Britain 1930 to 1997 was biased against Labour because it omitted the 1945–1951 Labour government, ends just before Tony Blair's Labour government in 1997 and asks pupils to list Conservative strengths and Labour weaknesses. In February, in a personal film for the Daily Politics series, Huq said it was "dangerous to deny that these things Blair–Brown administrations, or the post-war Labour government which brought in the welfare state and National Health Service ever happened" and she argued there was a pro-Conservative bias to what was being taught with a risk of "brainwashing our kids".

== Personal life ==
Huq married in 2003 and has a son, born in 2004. Her elder sister is an architect, and her younger sister is former Blue Peter presenter Konnie Huq; her brother-in-law is Konnie Huq's husband, the satirist and screenwriter Charlie Brooker.

Her father died on 5 September 2014, and her mother on 21 May 2017.

Huq speaks English, Bengali, French and Hindi.

== Books ==
Year	Title	Publisher	ISBN
2006	Beyond Subculture: Pop, Youth and Identity in a Postcolonial World	Routledge	ISBN 978-0415278157
2013	Making Sense of Suburbia Through Popular Culture	Bloomsbury Academic	ISBN 978-1780932248
2013	On the Edge: The Contested Cultures of English Suburbia	Lawrence and Wishart	ISBN 978-1907103728
2016	Reading the Riot Act: Reflections on the 2011 urban disorders in England	Routledge	ISBN 978-1138648388

Parliament of the United Kingdom
Preceded by Angie Bray	Member of Parliament for Ealing Central and Acton; 2015–present	Incumbent
