= East Acton (ward) =

Electoral ward in London, England

- Electoral ward for the Ealing London Borough Council
- Borough: Ealing
- County: Greater London
- Population: 15,210 (Note: 2021 census data, reported for 2022 ward boundaries)
- Electorate: 10,211 (Note: As of the 2026 local election)
- Major settlements: Acton Vale, East Acton
- Area: 1.857 km²

Current electoral ward
- Created: 2002
- Councillors: Stephen Donnelly; Rabia Nasimi; Hitesh Tailor
- Created from: Vale, Victoria
- GSS code: E05013522

East Acton is an electoral ward in the London Borough of Ealing. The ward was first used in the 2002 elections and elects three councillors to Ealing London Borough Council.

== Geography ==
The ward is named after the suburb of East Acton.

== Councillors ==
Election	Councillors		
2002	Phillip Portwood (Labour)	Kate Crawford (Labour until 2026; Liberal Democrat from 2026)	Paul Woodgate (Labour)
2006	Jim Randall (Conservative)	Kate Crawford (Labour until 2026; Liberal Democrat from 2026)	John Ross (Conservative)
2010	Atallah Said (Labour)	Kate Crawford (Labour until 2026; Liberal Democrat from 2026)	Hitesh Tailor (Labour)
2014	Kieron Gavan (Labour)	Kate Crawford (Labour until 2026; Liberal Democrat from 2026)	Hitesh Tailor (Labour)
2018	Stephen Donnelly (Labour)	Kate Crawford (Labour until 2026; Liberal Democrat from 2026)	Hitesh Tailor (Labour)
2022	Stephen Donnelly (Labour)	Kate Crawford (Labour until 2026; Liberal Democrat from 2026)	Hitesh Tailor (Labour)
23 Mar 2026	Stephen Donnelly (Labour)	Kate Crawford (Labour until 2026; Liberal Democrat from 2026)	Hitesh Tailor (Labour)
2026	Stephen Donnelly (Labour)	Rabia Nasimi (Labour)	Hitesh Tailor (Labour)

== Elections ==
=== 2022 ===
East Acton (3 seats)
Party	Candidate	Votes	%	±%
Labour	Kate Crawford	2,065	63.1	N/A
Labour	Stephen Donnelly	1,781	54.4	N/A
Labour	Hitesh Tailor	1,692	51.7	N/A
Conservative	Erwin Luzac	685	20.9	N/A
Conservative	Jonathan Benveniste	674	20.6	N/A
Conservative	Jim Randall	625	19.1	N/A
Green	Roisin McCloskey	603	18.4	N/A
Liberal Democrats	Margaret Horwich	354	10.8	N/A
Liberal Democrats	Rusi Dalal	292	8.9	N/A
Liberal Democrats	Deshanth Sirisena Gunatilake	197	6.0	N/A
EIN	Dan Lalla	169	5.2	N/A
TUSC	Mark Best	124	3.8	N/A
Turnout		3,272	33.32	
Labour hold				
Labour hold				
Labour hold				
