= Southfield (ward) =

Electoral ward in London, England

- Electoral ward for the Ealing London Borough Council
- Borough: Ealing
- County: Greater London
- Population: 16,475 (2021)
- Area: 1.534 km²

Current electoral ward
- Created: 1965
- Councillors: 3

Southfield is an electoral ward in the London Borough of Ealing. The ward was first used in the 1964 elections and elects three councillors to Ealing London Borough Council.

== Geography ==
The ward is named after the area of Southfield.

== Councillors ==
Election	Councillors		
2018	Gary Malcolm (Liberal Democrats)	Andrew Steed (Liberal Democrats)	Gary Busuttil (Liberal Democrats)
2022	Gary Malcolm (Liberal Democrats)	Andrew Steed (Liberal Democrats)	Gary Busuttil (Liberal Democrats)

== Elections ==
=== 2022 ===
Southfield (3 seats)
Party	Candidate	Votes	%	±%
Liberal Democrats	Gary Malcolm	2,614	51.6	N/A
Liberal Democrats	Andrew Steed	2,585	51.0	N/A
Liberal Democrats	Gary Busuttil	2,552	50.4	N/A
Labour	Sophie Charman-Blower	1,310	25.9	N/A
Labour	Chris Green	1,022	20.2	N/A
Labour	Tamoor Malik	967	19.1	N/A
Conservative	Crystal Eisinger	916	18.1	N/A
Green	Mike Landon	886	17.5	N/A
Conservative	Anthony Garrick	883	17.4	N/A
Conservative	Darryll Li-Ming Coates	854	16.9	N/A
Turnout		5,065	44.17	
Liberal Democrats hold				
Liberal Democrats hold				
Liberal Democrats hold				

=== 2018 ===
Southfield (3)
Party	Candidate	Votes	%	±%
Liberal Democrats	Gary Malcolm	2,217	46.5	+6.0
Liberal Democrats	Gary Busuttil	2,136	44.8	+4.3
Liberal Democrats	Andrew Timothy Steed	2,074	43.5	+6.7
Conservative	Vanessa Julie Costello	1,429	30.0	−3.8
Conservative	Julian Dominique Gallant	1,333	28.0	+0.6
Conservative	Andrew James MacDonald	1,322	27.8	+1.7
Labour	Jacqueline Ann Davies	1,023	21.5	+1.1
Labour	Peter Mark Evans	981	20.6	+1.4
Labour	Tony Loftus	839	17.6	+2.1
Green	Michael Stephen Landon	479	10.1	−5.0
Turnout		4,763	46.57	
Liberal Democrats hold		Swing		
Liberal Democrats hold		Swing		
Liberal Democrats hold		Swing		

== See also ==
- List of electoral wards in Greater London
