= Greenford Broadway (ward) =

Electoral ward in London, England

- Electoral ward for the Ealing London Borough Council
- Borough: Ealing
- County: Greater London
- Population: 17,384 (2021)
- Major settlements: Greenford Broadway
- Area: 2.432 km²

Current electoral ward
- Created: 2002
- Councillors: 3

Greenford Broadway is an electoral ward in the London Borough of Ealing. The ward was first used in the 2002 elections and elects three councillors to Ealing London Borough Council.

== Geography ==
The ward is named after the suburb of Greenford Broadway.

== Councillors ==
Election	Councillors		
2022	Varlene Alexander (Labour)	Anthony Kelly (Labour)	Harbhajan Dheer (Labour)

== Elections ==
=== 2022 ===
Greenford Broadway (3 seats)
Party	Candidate	Votes	%	±%
Labour	Varlene Alexander	2,257	60.3	N/A
Labour	Anthony Kelly	2,190	58.5	N/A
Labour	Harbhajan Dheer	2,107	56.3	N/A
Conservative	Peter Edwards	924	24.7	N/A
Conservative	Ajay Kumar Roy	842	22.5	N/A
Conservative	Sayed Masud	745	19.9	N/A
Green	Jan Gaca	460	12.3	N/A
Liberal Democrats	Timothy Archer	293	7.8	N/A
Liberal Democrats	John Ducker	278	7.4	N/A
Liberal Democrats	Isobel Platings	244	6.5	N/A
UKIP	Nicholas Markwell	158	4.2	N/A
Turnout		3,745	33.41	
Labour hold				
Labour hold				
Labour hold				

== See also ==
- List of electoral wards in Greater London
