= South Acton (ward) =

- Electoral ward for the Ealing London Borough Council
- South Acton ward boundaries since 2022
- Borough: Ealing
- County: Greater London
- Population: 16,822 (Note: 2021 census data, reported for 2022 ward boundaries)
- Electorate: 11,770 (Note: As of the 2026 local election)
- Area: 1.276 square kilometres (0.493 sq mi)

Current electoral ward
- Created: 2002
- Councillors: Katie Douglas; Yvonne Johnson; Husam Alharahsheh
- Created from: Heathfield, Springfield
- GSS code: E05013536

South Acton is an electoral ward in the London Borough of Ealing. The ward was first used in the 2002 elections and elects three councillors to Ealing London Borough Council.

== Councillors ==
Election	Councillors		
2002	Elizabeth Brookes (Labour)	Yvonne Johnson (Labour)	John Cudmore (Labour)
2006	Elizabeth Brookes (Labour)	Yvonne Johnson (Labour)	John Gallagher (Labour)
2010	Mik Sabiers (Labour)	Yvonne Johnson (Labour)	John Gallagher (Labour)
2014	Mik Sabiers (Labour)	Yvonne Johnson (Labour)	Josh Blacker (Labour)
2018	Mik Sabiers (Labour)	Yvonne Johnson (Labour)	Josh Blacker (Labour)
2022	Callum Anderson (Labour)	Yvonne Johnson (Labour)	Josh Blacker (Labour)
2024 by-election	Katie Douglas (Labour)	Yvonne Johnson (Labour)	Josh Blacker (Labour)
2026	Katie Douglas (Labour)	Yvonne Johnson (Labour)	Husam Alharahsheh (Green)

== Election results ==
=== Elections in the 2020s ===
2026 Ealing London Borough Council election: South Acton (3 seats)
Party	Candidate	Votes	%	±%
Labour	Katie Douglas	1,469		
Labour	Yvonne Johnson	1,306		
Green	Husam Alharahsheh	1,239		
Green	Christina Meiklejohn	1,195		
Labour	Gareth Shaw	1,128		
Green	Elyes Rezgui	957		
Conservative	Antoni Bialek	550		
Ealing Community Independents	Miça Evans	542		
Liberal Democrats	Luke Hearn	510		
Ealing Community Independents	Elizabeth Jones	486		
Liberal Democrats	Margaret Joachim	479		
Conservative	Stephen Peach	479		
Reform	Anna Grayson-Morley	454		
Conservative	Anura Keppetipola	446		
Ealing Community Independents	Glen Miller	433		
Reform	Stephen Jewell	432		
Reform	Nicholas Rees	407		
Liberal Democrats	Peter Roche	391		
Turnout				
Labour hold		Swing		
Labour hold		Swing		
Green gain from Labour		Swing		

2024 South Acton by-election, 10 October 2024
Party	Candidate	Votes	%	±%
Labour	Katie Douglas	1,009	48.8	
Conservative	Kristian Mower	303	14.7	
Green	Andrew Walkley	287	13.9	
Liberal Democrats	Timothy Hughes	208	10.1	
Reform	Marco Manassero	159	7.7	
Independent	Julie Carter	65	3.1	
Workers Party	Lucas Herbst	18	0.9	
TUSC	David Hofman	18	0.9	
Turnout				
Labour hold		Swing		

The by-election was called following the resignation of Cllr Callum Anderson, who had been elected MP for Buckingham and Bletchley at the 2024 general election. It was held on the same day as by-elections in Hanger Hill and Northolt Mandeville wards.

2022 Ealing London Borough Council election: South Acton (3)
Party	Candidate	Votes	%	±%
Labour	Josh Blacker	2,292	58.2	N/A
Labour	Yvonne Johnson	2,210	56.1	N/A
Labour	Callum Anderson	2,111	53.6	N/A
Green	Emily Grassi	915	23.2	N/A
Conservative	John Peach	711	18.1	N/A
Conservative	Arthur Alexander	706	17.9	N/A
Conservative	Jack Dhillo	607	15.4	N/A
Liberal Democrats	Margaret Joachim	543	13.8	N/A
Liberal Democrats	Timothy Hughes	459	11.7	N/A
Liberal Democrats	Judith Ollendorff	335	8.5	N/A
Independent	Glen Red Brick	150	3.8	N/A
TUSC	Devrim Kutlu	128	3.3	N/A
Turnout		3,937	34.80	
Labour win (new boundaries)				
Labour win (new boundaries)				
Labour win (new boundaries)				

=== Elections in the 2010s ===
2018 Ealing London Borough Council election: South Acton (3)
Party	Candidate	Votes	%	±%
Labour	Yvonne Johnson	2,279	55.9	+6.1
Labour	Josh Blacker	2,168	53.2	+4.9
Labour	Mik Sabiers	1,986	48.7	+6.5
Conservative	Sara Kumar	943	23.1	−7.0
Conservative	Andy Kalkhoran	887	21.8	−7.4
Conservative	Ali Naiery	792	19.4	−4.4
Liberal Democrats	Doreen James	506	12.4	+3.9
Green	Marc Tonti	459	11.3	−3.7
Liberal Democrats	Nicholas Winkfield	436	10.7	+2.2
Liberal Democrats	David Antoni	399	9.8	+4.1
Independent	Dan Meskell	264	6.5	+0.9
Independent	Bob Little	203	5.0	−3.7
Duma Polska	Marta Iwaniak	197	4.8	N/A
Duma Polska	Dorota Stec	174	4.3	N/A
Turnout		4,077	38.84	
Labour hold		Swing		
Labour hold		Swing		
Labour hold		Swing		
