= Ealing London Borough Council =

Local authority for the London Borough of Ealing, England

- Coat of arms

- Council logo

Type
- Type: London borough council of the London Borough of Ealing
- Houses: Unicameral

Leadership
- Mayor: Faduma Mohamed, Labour since 26 May 2026
- Leader: Peter Mason, Labour since 18 May 2021
- Chief Executive: Tony Clements since 2022

Structure
- Seats: 70 councillors
- Political groups: Administration (46) Labour (46) Other parties (24) Liberal Democrat (13) Conservative (5) Green (5) Independent (1)
- Length of term: Whole council elected every four years

Elections
- Voting system: Plurality at-large (FPTP)
- Last election: 7 May 2026
- Next election: May 2030

Meeting place
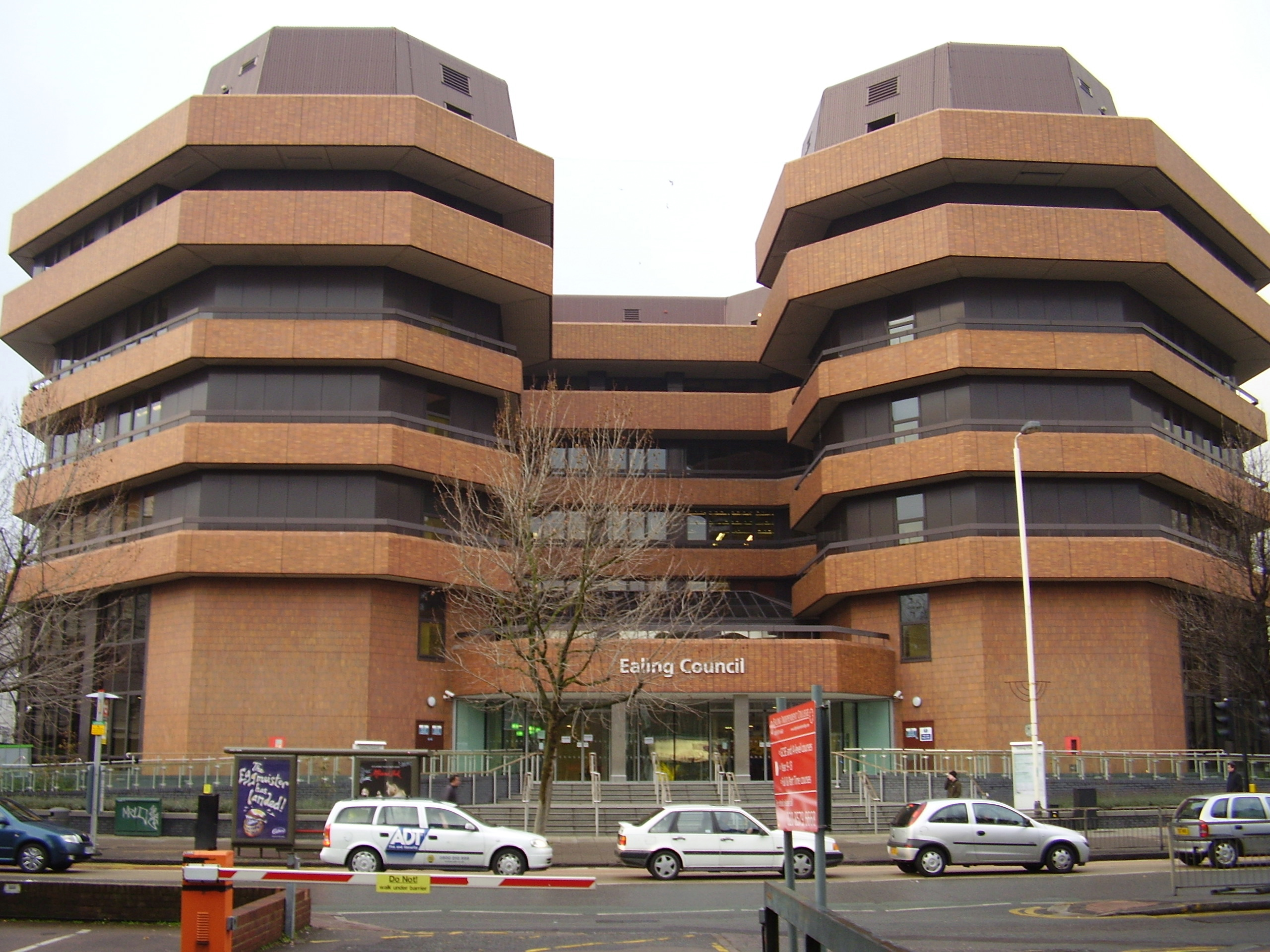
- Perceval House, 14-16 Uxbridge Road, Ealing, London, W5 2HL

Website
- www.ealing.gov.uk

Ealing London Borough Council, also known as Ealing Council, is the local authority for the London Borough of Ealing in Greater London, England. The council is responsible for providing a range of services within the borough. The council has been under Labour majority control since 2010. The council is based at Perceval House in Ealing.

== History ==
There has been an Ealing local authority since 1863 when a local government district was created for Ealing, governed by an elected local board. Such districts were reconstituted as urban districts under the Local Government Act 1894, which saw the board replaced by an urban district council. Ealing was subsequently incorporated to become a municipal borough in 1901, governed by a body formally called the "Mayor, Aldermen and Burgesses of the Borough of Ealing", generally known as the corporation, town council or borough council.

The much larger London Borough of Ealing and its council were created under the London Government Act 1963, with the first election held in 1964. For its first year the council acted as a shadow authority alongside the area's three outgoing authorities, being the borough councils of Ealing, Acton and Southall. The new council formally came into its powers on 1 April 1965, at which point the old districts and their councils were abolished. The council's full legal name is "The Mayor and Burgesses of the London Borough of Ealing".

From 1965 until 1986 the council was a lower-tier authority, with upper-tier functions provided by the Greater London Council. The split of powers and functions meant that the Greater London Council was responsible for "wide area" services such as fire, ambulance, flood prevention, and refuse disposal; with the boroughs (including Ealing) responsible for "personal" services such as social care, libraries, cemeteries and refuse collection. As an outer London borough council Ealing has been a local education authority since 1965. The Greater London Council was abolished in 1986 and its functions passed to the London Boroughs, with some services provided through joint committees.

Since 2000 the Greater London Authority has taken some responsibility for highways and planning control from the council, but within the English local government system the council remains a "most purpose" authority in terms of the available range of powers and functions.

In 2018 Ealing Council was the first council in the UK to introduce a buffer zone to prevent anti-abortion protesters campaigning near a Marie Stopes clinic, with the aim of preventing women going into the clinic being harassed.

In January 2019, the council decided to stop the smoking cessation service in the borough, to save £395,000 over the following two years, as part of its plan to deal with an overall budget gap of £57 million as a result of reduced funding.

== Powers and functions ==
The local authority derives its powers and functions from the London Government Act 1963 and subsequent legislation, and has the powers and functions of a London borough council. It sets council tax and as a billing authority it also collects precepts for Greater London Authority functions and business rates. It sets planning policies which complement Greater London Authority and national policies, and decides on almost all planning applications accordingly. It is also the local education authority.

== Political control ==
The council has been under Labour majority control since 2010.

The first election was held in 1964, initially operating as a shadow authority alongside the outgoing authorities until it came into its powers on 1 April 1965. Political control of the council since 1965 has been as follows:

| Party in control | Years |
|---|---|
| Labour | 1965–1968 |
| Conservative | 1968–1971 |
| Labour | 1971–1978 |
| Conservative | 1978–1986 |
| Labour | 1986–1990 |
| Conservative | 1990–1994 |
| Labour | 1994–2006 |
| Conservative | 2006–2010 |
| Labour | 2010–present |

=== Leadership ===
The role of Mayor of Ealing is largely ceremonial. Political leadership is instead provided by the leader of the council. The leaders since 1965 have been:

| Councillor | Party | From | To |
|---|---|---|---|
| William Hopkins | Labour | 1964 | 1968 |
| Robert Hetherington | Conservative | 1968 | 1971 |
| John Telfer | Labour | 1971 | 1975 |
| Michael Elliot | Labour | 1975 | 1978 |
| Beatrice Howard | Conservative | 1978 | 1981 |
| John Wood | Conservative | 1981 | 1983 |
| Ken Kettle | Conservative | 1983 | 1986 |
| Len Turner | Labour | 1986 | 1989 |
| John Cudmore | Labour | 1989 | 1990 |
| Martin Mallam | Conservative | 1990 | 1991 |
| Graham Bull | Conservative | 1991 | 1994 |
| John Cudmore | Labour | 1994 | 17 May 2005 |
| Leo Thomson | Labour | 17 May 2005 | May 2006 |
| Jason Stacey | Conservative | 23 May 2006 | May 2010 |
| Julian Bell | Labour | 25 May 2010 | 18 May 2021 |
| Peter Mason | Labour | 18 May 2021 | |

=== Composition ===
Following the 2026 election, the composition of the council is:

| Party | Councillors |
|---|---|
| Labour | 46 |
| Liberal Democrats | 13 |
| Conservative | 5 |
| Green | 5 |
| Independent | 1 |
| Total | 70 |

The next election is due in May 2030.

== Elections ==
Since the last boundary changes in 2022 the council has comprised 70 councillors representing 24 wards, with each ward electing two or three councillors. Elections are held every four years.

== Wards ==
The wards of Ealing and the number of seats:

- Central Greenford (3)
- Dormers Wells (3)
- Ealing Broadway (3)
- Ealing Common (3)
- East Acton (3)
- Greenford Broadway (3)
- Hanger Hill (3)
- Hanwell Broadway (3)
- Lady Margaret (3)
- North Acton (3)
- North Greenford (3)
- North Hanwell (3)
- Northfield (3)
- Northolt Mandeville (3)
- Northolt West End (3)
- Norwood Green (3)
- Perivale (3)
- Pitshanger (3)
- South Acton (3)
- Southall Broadway (2)
- Southall Green (3)
- Southall West (2)
- Southfield (3)
- Walpole (3)

== Premises ==
The council's headquarters are at Perceval House on Uxbridge Road in Ealing, which was completed in 1983. The building was initially called the Civic Centre, being renamed Perceval House in 1990.

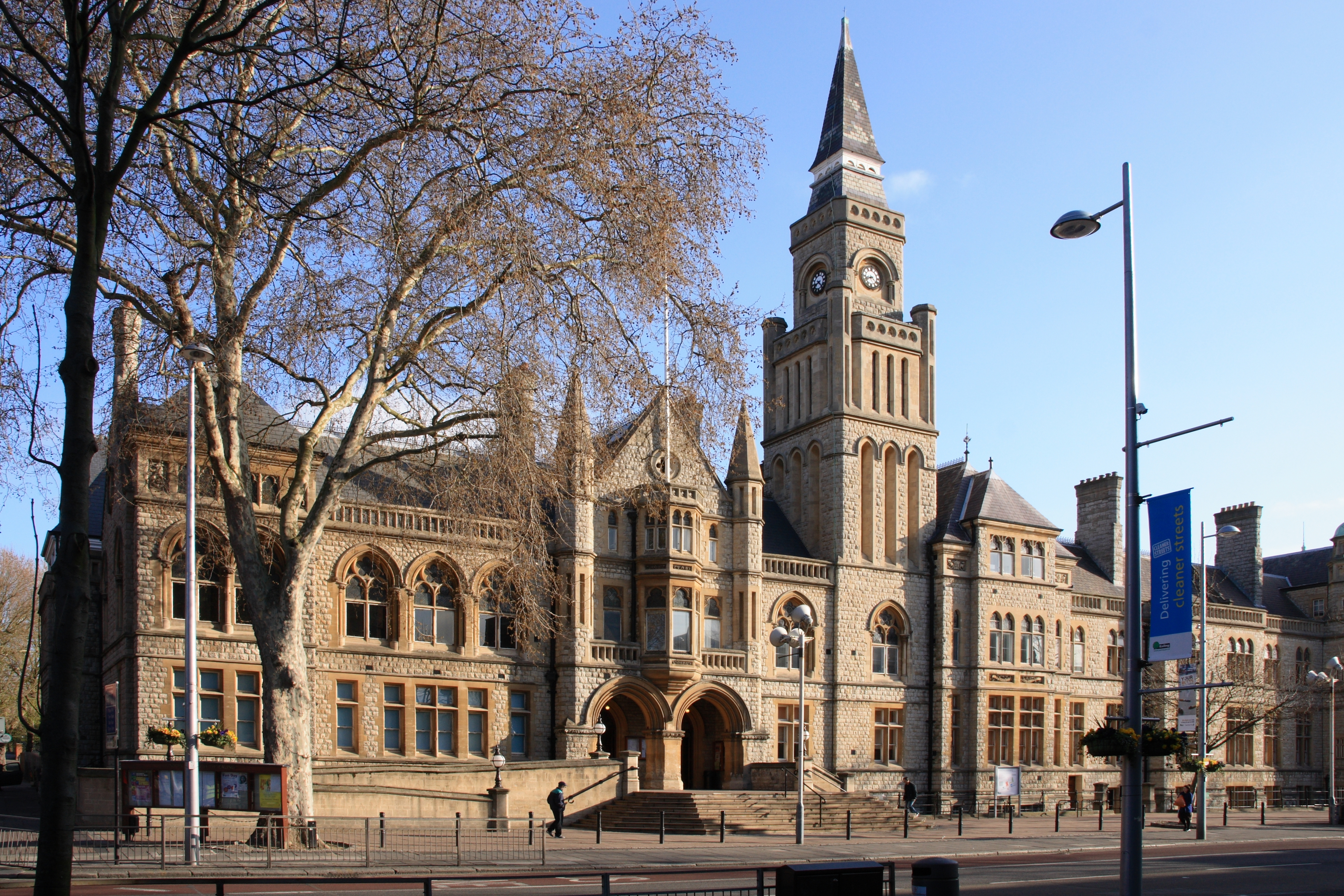
Ealing Town Hall

The council was formerly based at the adjacent Ealing Town Hall on New Broadway, which had been completed in 1888 for the old Ealing Local Board. After the Civic Centre opened, the Town Hall continued to be used for meetings and some office functions until it was closed in 2023.
