= Peter Mason (politician) =

British politician

Peter Elijah Jonathan Mason (born Peter Robert Ness) is a British Labour politician and town planner who, since May 2021, is the leader of Ealing London Borough Council. He was first elected to Ealing Council in 2014. He was previously Ealing's Cabinet Member for Housing, Planning & Transformation and, from 2013 to 2021, National Secretary of the Jewish Labour Movement.

Mason is the former director of London Jewish Forum. Following a report by former Liberty director Shami Chakrabarti that recommended a transfer of powers to the Labour Party's National Constitutional Committee (NCC), he was elected to the NCC (which now handles disciplinary cases). In September 2024 he was elected to the National Executive Committee of the Labour Party.
