= 2022 Ealing London Borough Council election =

2022 local election in Ealing

2022 Ealing Council election
- 5 May 2022

All 70 council seats
	First party	Second party	Third party
Leader	Peter Mason	Gary Malcolm	Gregory Stafford
Party	Labour	Liberal Democrats	Conservative
Last election	57 seats, 56.4%	4 seats, 12.2%	8 seats, 25.2%
Seats won	59	6	5
Seat change	▲2	▲2	▼3
Popular vote	140,915	43,194	66,885
Percentage	51.1%	15.7%	24.3%
Swing	▼5.3%	▲3.5%	▼0.9%
council control before election
Labour
Subsequent council control
Labour

The 2022 Ealing London Borough Council election took place on 5 May 2022, under new election boundaries, which increased the number of Ealing London Borough Council councillors to 70. The elections took place alongside local elections in the other London boroughs and elections to local authorities across the United Kingdom.

The Labour Party maintained its control of the council, winning 59 out of the 70 seats with the Liberal Democrats forming the primary opposition with six of the remaining seats, a role the party takes from the Conservative Party who were elected to the council with five seats, three fewer than they won in 2018.

== Background ==
=== History ===
Result of the 2018 borough election

The thirty-two London boroughs were established in 1965 by the London Government Act 1963. They are the principal authorities in Greater London and have responsibilities including education, housing, planning, highways, social services, libraries, recreation, waste, environmental health and revenue collection. Some of the powers are shared with the Greater London Authority, which also manages passenger transport, police and fire.

Since its formation, Ealing has been under either Labour control or Conservative control. Labour, Conservative, Liberal Democrat and independent and residents association councillors have been elected to the council. The council has had an overall Labour majority since the 2010 election, in which Labour won forty seats, the Conservatives won twenty-four and the Liberal Democrats won five. In the most recent election in 2018, Labour won 57 seats, the Conservatives won eight and the Liberal Democrats won four. The incumbent leader of the council is the Labour councillor Peter Mason, who has held that position since May 2021.

=== Council term ===
In October 2018, a Labour councillor for Dormers Wells, Tej Ram Bagha, died. He had served on the council for twenty-four years, including as mayor in 2014. In the 8 November 2018 by-election to replace him, the Labour candidate Mohinda Kaur Midha was elected. Two Conservative councillors in the borough were elected as Members of Parliament in the 2019 general election. Alexander Stafford was elected as MP for Rother Valley and Joy Morrissey became MP for Beaconsfield. The Labour leader of Ealing council called for both to resign as councillors as their new roles wouldn't leave them enough time to fulfil their duties as councillors. Morrissey announced her resignation on 11 February 2020. Stafford resigned in March. By-elections for both seats were due to be held in May 2020 alongside the London mayoral election and London Assembly election, but both the council by-elections and London-wide elections were delayed by a year due to the COVID-19 pandemic. In July 2020, Anna Tomlinson, a Labour councillor for Hobbayne ward, died. By-elections for all three seats were held on 6 May 2021 alongside the 2021 London mayoral election and London Assembly election. Each seat was held by the party of its previous incumbent: Stafford's seat of Ealing Broadway was won by the Conservative candidate Julian Gallant, Morrissey's seat of Hanger Hill was won by the Conservative candidate Fabio Conti and Tomlinson's seat of Hobbayne was won by the Labour candidate Louise Brett. In May 2021, Peter Mason was chosen by the Labour group as the new leader of the council. Lewis Cox, a Labour councillor for Hobbayne ward, resigned, calling Ealing Labour "toxic". The by-election to replace him was held on 16 September 2021, and was won by the Labour candidate Claire Tighe. Tighe was working as a Labour Party official. The Labour councillor Tejinder Dhami died in December 2021 after 19 years on the council. As this was less than six months from the election, no by-election was held.

Along with most other London boroughs, Ealing was subject to a boundary review ahead of the 2022 election. The Local Government Boundary Commission for England concluded that the council should have 70 seats, an increase of one, and produced new election boundaries following a period of consultation. The new scheme consists of twenty-two three-councillor wards and two two-councillor wards.

== Electoral process ==
Ealing, like other London borough councils, elects all of its councillors at once every four years. The previous election took place in 2018. The election took place by multi-member first-past-the-post voting, with each ward being represented by two or three councillors. Electors had as many votes as there are councillors to be elected in their ward, with the top two or three being elected.

All registered electors (British, Irish, Commonwealth and European Union citizens) living in London aged 18 or over were entitled to vote in the election. People who lived at two addresses in different councils, such as university students with different term-time and holiday addresses, were entitled to be registered for and vote in elections in both local authorities. Voting in-person at polling stations took place from 7:00 to 22:00 on election day, and voters were able to apply for postal votes or proxy votes in advance of the election.

== Council composition ==
Council composition after the 2018 election

Council composition ahead of the 2022 election

After 2018 election		Before 2022 election		After 2022 election	
Party	Seats	Party	Seats	Party	Seats
Labour	57	Labour	57	Labour	59
Conservative	8	Conservative	8	Liberal Democrats	6
Liberal Democrats	4	Liberal Democrats	4	Conservative	5

== Results summary ==
2022 Ealing London Borough Council election
Party	Seats	Gains	Losses	Net gain/loss	Seats %	Votes %	Votes	+/−
Labour	59	1	0	▲2	84.3	51.1	140,915	-5.3
Liberal Democrats	6	2	0	▲2	8.6	15.7	43,194	+3.5
Conservative	5	0	3	▼3	7.1	24.3	66,885	-0.9
Green	0	0	0	0	0.0	7.3	20,246	+3.3
EIN	0	0	0	0	0.0	0.9	2,459	New
TUSC	0	0	0	0	0.0	0.4	1,001	New
Independent	0	0	0	0	0.0	0.2	497	-0.2
UKIP	0	0	0	0	0.0	0.1	259	-0.2
SDP	0	0	0	0	0.0	0.0	109	New

== Ward results ==
EIN = Ealing Independent Network

Statements of persons nominated were published on 6 April. The count took place between 5th May 2022 and 6th May 2022.

=== Central Greenford ===
Central Greenford (3 seats)
Party	Candidate	Votes	%	±%
Labour	Aysha Raza*	1,848	52.2	N/A
Labour	Sanjai Kohli	1,806	51.0	N/A
Labour	Shabaz Ahmed	1,798	50.8	N/A
Conservative	Miled Maroun	1,047	29.6	N/A
Conservative	Anakin England	934	26.4	N/A
Conservative	Olumide Ojo	876	24.8	N/A
Green	John Rolt	443	12.5	N/A
Liberal Democrats	Alexander Abrahams	356	10.1	N/A
Liberal Democrats	John Mitchell	339	9.6	N/A
Liberal Democrats	Leslie Hurst	337	9.5	N/A
TUSC	Ben Goldstone	115	3.2	N/A
Turnout		3,539	37.24	N/A
Labour win (new seat)				
Labour win (new seat)				
Labour win (new seat)				

=== Dormers Wells ===
Dormers Wells (3 seats)
Party	Candidate	Votes	%	±%
Labour	Kanwal Bains	2,498	64.9	N/A
Labour	Ranjit Dheer	2,367	61.5	N/A
Labour	Mohinder Midha	2,272	59.1	N/A
Conservative	Babul Sharker	630	16.4	N/A
Conservative	Mohammed Hoshen	625	16.2	N/A
Conservative	Salah Uddin	597	15.5	N/A
EIN	Minni Dogra	415	10.8	N/A
Green	Darren Moore	371	9.6	N/A
Liberal Democrats	Bob Browning	338	8.8	N/A
Liberal Democrats	Oliver Murphy	281	7.3	N/A
Liberal Democrats	Francesco Fruzza	262	6.8	N/A
Turnout		3,847	37.27	
Labour hold				
Labour hold				
Labour hold				

=== Ealing Broadway ===
Ealing Broadway (3 seats)
Party	Candidate	Votes	%	±%
Conservative	Julian Gallant	1,713	41.8	N/A
Conservative	Anthony Young	1,667	40.7	N/A
Conservative	Seema Kumar	1,595	38.9	N/A
Labour	Monika Kohli	1,351	33.0	N/A
Labour	Sudarshan Dhanda	1,285	31.4	N/A
Labour	Charles White	1,140	27.8	N/A
Green	Meena Hans	897	21.9	N/A
Liberal Democrats	Michael Gettleson	725	17.7	N/A
Liberal Democrats	Bex Scott	712	17.4	N/A
Liberal Democrats	Francis Salaun	621	15.2	N/A
Turnout		4,097	42.47	
Conservative hold				
Conservative hold				
Conservative hold				

=== Ealing Common ===
Ealing Common (3 seats)
Party	Candidate	Votes	%	±%
Liberal Democrats	Jon Ball	2,218	43.5	N/A
Liberal Democrats	Connie Hersch	1,877	36.8	N/A
Labour	Praveen Anand	1,847	36.2	N/A
Liberal Democrats	Benedict Cross	1,778	34.9	N/A
Labour	Jags Sanghera	1,480	29.0	N/A
Labour	Iram Wooley	1,397	27.4	N/A
Conservative	Liz Paice	1,038	20.4	N/A
Conservative	Andrew MacDonald	1,027	20.1	N/A
Conservative	Patrick Cusworth	989	19.4	N/A
Green	Emma Powell	894	17.5	N/A
UKIP	Julie Carter	101	2.0	N/A
Turnout		5,099	45.76	
Liberal Democrats hold				
Liberal Democrats gain from Conservative				
Labour hold				

=== East Acton ===
East Acton (3 seats)
Party	Candidate	Votes	%	±%
Labour	Kate Crawford	2,065	63.1	N/A
Labour	Stephen Donnelly	1,781	54.4	N/A
Labour	Hitesh Tailor	1,692	51.7	N/A
Conservative	Erwin Luzac	685	20.9	N/A
Conservative	Jonathan Benveniste	674	20.6	N/A
Conservative	Jim Randall	625	19.1	N/A
Green	Roisin McCloskey	603	18.4	N/A
Liberal Democrats	Margaret Horwich	354	10.8	N/A
Liberal Democrats	Rusi Dalal	292	8.9	N/A
Liberal Democrats	Deshanth Gunatilake	197	6.0	N/A
EIN	Dan Lalla	169	5.2	N/A
TUSC	Mark Best	124	3.8	N/A
Turnout		3,272	33.32	
Labour hold				
Labour hold				
Labour hold				

=== Greenford Broadway ===
Greenford Broadway (3 seats)
Party	Candidate	Votes	%	±%
Labour	Varlene Alexander	2,257	60.3	N/A
Labour	Anthony Kelly	2,190	58.5	N/A
Labour	Harbhajan Dheer	2,107	56.3	N/A
Conservative	Peter Edwards	924	24.7	N/A
Conservative	Ajay Roy	842	22.5	N/A
Conservative	Sayed Masud	745	19.9	N/A
Green	Jan Gaca	460	12.3	N/A
Liberal Democrats	Timothy Archer	293	7.8	N/A
Liberal Democrats	John Ducker	278	7.4	N/A
Liberal Democrats	Isobel Platings	244	6.5	N/A
UKIP	Nicholas Markwell	158	4.2	N/A
Turnout		3,745	33.41	
Labour hold				
Labour hold				
Labour hold				

=== Hanger Hill ===
Hanger Hill (3 seats)
Party	Candidate	Votes	%	±%
Liberal Democrats	Athena Zissimos	1,657	36.2	N/A
Conservative	Fabio Conti	1,559	34.0	N/A
Conservative	Greg Stafford	1,549	33.8	N/A
Conservative	Nigel Sumner	1,479	32.3	N/A
Liberal Democrats	Mark Sanders	1,456	31.8	N/A
Liberal Democrats	Jonathan Oxley	1,437	31.4	N/A
Labour	Joan Russell	1,166	25.4	N/A
Labour	Avesta Afshari-Mehr	1,154	25.2	N/A
Labour	Oliver Lozada	1,094	23.9	N/A
Green	Michal Solski	645	14.1	N/A
Turnout		4,582	41.94	
Liberal Democrats gain from Conservative				
Conservative hold				
Conservative hold				

=== Hanwell Broadway ===
Hanwell Broadway (3 seats)
Party	Candidate	Votes	%	±%
Labour	Yoel Gordon	1,779	40.9	N/A
Labour	Monica Hamidi	1,767	40.6	N/A
Labour	Polly Knewstub	1,720	39.5	N/A
Green	Kate Crossland	1,331	30.6	N/A
Green	Neil Reynolds	1,285	29.5	N/A
Green	Marijn Van De Geer	1,022	23.5	N/A
Conservative	Gary Barak	827	19.0	N/A
Conservative	David Compton-Taylor	770	17.7	N/A
Conservative	Waheeda Shah	617	14.2	N/A
Liberal Democrats	Nigel Bakhai	616	14.1	N/A
Liberal Democrats	Alastair Mitton	561	12.9	N/A
Liberal Democrats	Lakhbir Singh	342	7.9	N/A
Turnout		4,354	43.46	
Labour win (new seat)				
Labour win (new seat)				
Labour win (new seat)				

=== Lady Margaret ===
Lady Margaret (3 seats)
Party	Candidate	Votes	%	±%
Labour	Karam Mohan	2,708	64.4	N/A
Labour	Kamaldeep Sahota	2,690	63.9	N/A
Labour	Swaran Padda	2,649	63.0	N/A
Conservative	Forman Ali	862	20.5	N/A
Conservative	Muhammad Islam	730	17.3	N/A
Conservative	Mohammed Rashid	681	16.2	N/A
Green	Louise Graham	547	13.0	N/A
Liberal Democrats	John Gower	384	9.1	N/A
Liberal Democrats	Ian Hawkes	367	8.7	N/A
Liberal Democrats	Milena Izmirlieva	237	5.6	N/A
Turnout		4,208	38.49	
Labour hold				
Labour hold				
Labour hold				

=== North Acton ===
North Acton (3 seats)
Party	Candidate	Votes	%	±%
Labour	Daniel Crawford	1,872	56.8	N/A
Labour	Hodan Haili	1,544	46.9	N/A
Labour	Blerina Hashani	1,512	45.9	N/A
Conservative	Ann Lazarow	717	21.8	N/A
Conservative	Andy Kalkhoran	674	20.5	N/A
Green	Ineta Hans-Barker	669	20.3	N/A
Conservative	James Harper	666	20.2	N/A
Liberal Democrats	Mervyn Allen	460	14.0	N/A
Liberal Democrats	Myer Salaman	377	11.4	N/A
Liberal Democrats	Alan Whelan	346	10.5	N/A
EIN	Leslie Bunder	223	6.8	N/A
EIN	Grey Wixted	153	4.6	N/A
TUSC	David Hofman	110	3.3	N/A
Turnout		3,294	30.71	
Labour win (new seat)				
Labour win (new seat)				
Labour win (new seat)				

=== North Greenford ===
North Greenford (3 seats)
Party	Candidate	Votes	%	±%
Labour	Amarjit Jammu	2,453	56.7	N/A
Labour	Shital Manro	2,393	55.3	N/A
Labour	Muhammad Iqbal	2,319	53.6	N/A
Conservative	George Lafford	1,095	25.3	N/A
Conservative	Predrag Babic	998	23.1	N/A
Conservative	Minoo Sullivan	910	21.0	N/A
Green	Ryan Allain	560	12.9	N/A
Liberal Democrats	Justin Kempley	536	12.4	N/A
Liberal Democrats	Loreta Alac	496	11.5	N/A
Liberal Democrats	Judith Ducker	431	10.0	N/A
Turnout		4,326	38.41	
Labour hold				
Labour hold				
Labour hold				

=== North Hanwell ===
North Hanwell (3 seats)
Party	Candidate	Votes	%	±%
Labour	Louise Brett	2,312	57.5	N/A
Labour	Claire Tighe	2,207	54.9	N/A
Labour	Ray Wall	1,994	49.6	N/A
Conservative	Benjamin Davies	871	21.7	N/A
Green	Alan Anderson	858	21.4	N/A
Conservative	Ian Potts	848	21.1	N/A
Conservative	Sam Yung	786	19.6	N/A
Liberal Democrats	Zoe Horwich	637	15.9	N/A
Liberal Democrats	Peter Hutchison	461	11.5	N/A
Liberal Democrats	Gillian Rowley	313	7.8	N/A
TUSC	Tony Gill	158	3.9	N/A
Turnout		4,018	40.80	
Labour win (new seat)				
Labour win (new seat)				
Labour win (new seat)				

=== Northfield ===
Northfield (3 seats)
Party	Candidate	Votes	%	±%
Labour	Paul Driscoll	2,424	44.3	N/A
Labour	Ian Kingston	2,227	40.7	N/A
Labour	Kim Nagpal	2,041	37.3	N/A
Conservative	Theresa Mullins	1,772	32.4	N/A
Conservative	Anita Kapoor	1,705	31.2	N/A
Conservative	Sean Hanrahan	1,676	30.6	N/A
Green	Sam Diamond	858	15.7	N/A
Green	Christina Meiklejohn	816	14.9	N/A
Liberal Democrats	Leslie Glancy	714	13.0	N/A
Liberal Democrats	David Horrex	669	12.2	N/A
Green	Ross Warren	649	11.9	N/A
Liberal Democrats	Ashok Sinhal	484	8.8	N/A
Turnout		5,472	53.73	
Labour hold				
Labour hold				
Labour gain from Conservative				

=== Northolt Mandeville ===
Northolt Mandeville (3 seats)
Party	Candidate	Votes	%	±%
Labour Co-op	Deirdre Costigan	2,566	61.2	N/A
Labour Co-op	Miriam Rice	2,364	56.4	N/A
Labour Co-op	Chris Summers	2,309	55.1	N/A
Conservative	Justin Anderson	1,236	29.5	N/A
Conservative	Diva Nazari	990	23.6	N/A
Conservative	Ali Ahmed	984	23.5	N/A
Green	Katy Barton	551	13.1	N/A
Liberal Democrats	Matthew Hirst	312	7.4	N/A
Liberal Democrats	Lawrence Aggleton	287	6.8	N/A
Liberal Democrats	Pat Mellor	220	5.2	N/A
Turnout		4,194	37.06	
Labour hold				
Labour hold				
Labour hold				

=== Northolt West End ===
Northolt West End (3 seats)
Party	Candidate	Votes	%	±%
Labour	Dee Martin	2,170	64.6	N/A
Labour	Lauren Wall	2,164	64.4	N/A
Labour	Bassam Mahfouz	2,076	61.8	N/A
Conservative	Jamal Ahmed	661	19.7	N/A
Conservative	Abul Sarker	582	17.3	N/A
Conservative	Mohammed Uddin	538	16.0	N/A
Green	Natalia Kubica	439	13.1	N/A
Liberal Democrats	Lee Horwich	301	9.0	N/A
Liberal Democrats	Bridgette Chalu	256	7.6	N/A
Liberal Democrats	Niall Haughian	248	7.4	N/A
Turnout		3,361	32.30	
Labour hold				
Labour hold				
Labour hold				

=== Norwood Green ===
Norwood Green (3 seats)
Party	Candidate	Votes	%	±%
Labour	John Martin	2,706	70.3	N/A
Labour	Tarept Sidhu	2,600	67.6	N/A
Labour	Gul Murtaza	2,470	64.2	N/A
Conservative	Mohammed Badsha	568	14.8	N/A
Conservative	Sabikun Nahar	543	14.1	N/A
Green	Nikki Daniel	520	13.5	N/A
Conservative	Khandaker Rahman	510	13.3	N/A
Liberal Democrats	John Gauss	269	7.0	N/A
Liberal Democrats	Pantea Etessami	221	5.7	N/A
Liberal Democrats	Michael Pidoux	200	5.2	N/A
TUSC	Mark Benjamin	144	3.7	N/A
Turnout		3,848	36.99	
Labour hold				
Labour hold				
Labour hold				

=== Perivale ===
Perivale (3 seats)
Party	Candidate	Votes	%	±%
Labour	Munir Ahmed	2,505	55.1	N/A
Labour	Tariq Mahmood	2,423	53.3	N/A
Labour	Charan Sharma	2,342	51.5	N/A
Conservative	Andrew Bailey	1,452	31.9	N/A
Conservative	Vlod Barchuk	1,234	27.1	N/A
Conservative	Edmond Yeo	1,232	27.1	N/A
Green	Alex Vines	517	11.4	N/A
Liberal Democrats	Margaret Friday	391	8.6	N/A
Liberal Democrats	Geoffrey Berg	357	7.9	N/A
Liberal Democrats	Tony Miller	288	6.3	N/A
TUSC	Helen Pattison	128	2.8	N/A
Turnout		4,546	41.24	
Labour hold				
Labour hold				
Labour hold				

=== Pitshanger ===
Pitshanger (3 seats)
Party	Candidate	Votes	%	±%
Labour	Rima Baaklini	2,106	42.5	N/A
Labour	Ilayda Nijhar	2,017	40.7	N/A
Labour	Ben Wesson	1,990	40.1	N/A
Conservative	Ian Proud	1,576	31.8	N/A
Conservative	Sara Kumar	1,480	29.8	N/A
Conservative	Fatima Rana	1,392	28.1	N/A
Liberal Democrats	Francesco Fruzza	1,106	22.3	N/A
Green	Sarah McCartney	861	17.4	N/A
Liberal Democrats	Roderick Nathan	766	15.4	N/A
Liberal Democrats	David Martin	723	14.6	N/A
SDP	Les Beaumont	109	2.2	N/A
TUSC	Lamley Amoako-Atta	94	1.9	N/A
Turnout		4,959	48.06	
Labour win (new seat)				
Labour win (new seat)				
Labour win (new seat)				

=== South Acton ===
South Acton (3 seats)
Party	Candidate	Votes	%	±%
Labour	Josh Blacker	2,292	58.2	N/A
Labour	Yvonne Johnson	2,210	56.1	N/A
Labour	Callum Anderson	2,111	53.6	N/A
Green	Emily Grassi	915	23.2	N/A
Conservative	John Peach	711	18.1	N/A
Conservative	Arthur Alexander	706	17.9	N/A
Conservative	Jack Dhillon	607	15.4	N/A
Liberal Democrats	Margaret Joachim	543	13.8	N/A
Liberal Democrats	Timothy Hughes	459	11.7	N/A
Liberal Democrats	Judith Ollendorff	335	8.5	N/A
Independent	Glen Red Brick	150	3.8	N/A
TUSC	Devrim Kutlu	128	3.3	N/A
Turnout		3,937	34.80	
Labour hold				
Labour hold				
Labour hold				

=== Southall Broadway ===
Southall Broadway (2 seats)
Party	Candidate	Votes	%	±%
Labour	Kamaljit Nagpal	1,831	59.0	N/A
Labour	Sarfraz Khan	1,793	57.8	N/A
Conservative	Darsham Bhinder	667	21.5	N/A
Conservative	Mohd Miah	584	18.8	N/A
EIN	Rashpal Bhatti	238	7.7	N/A
Liberal Democrats	Robin Bettridge	220	7.1	N/A
Green	Ann Curtis	213	6.9	N/A
EIN	Harmandra Dhaliwal	201	6.5	N/A
Liberal Democrats	David Zerdin	120	3.9	N/A
Turnout		3,101	41.83	
Labour hold				
Labour hold				

=== Southall Green ===
Southall Green (3 seats)
Party	Candidate	Votes	%	±%
Labour	Jasbir Kaur Anand	3,105	68.9	N/A
Labour	Kamaljit Singh Dhindsa	3,034	67.3	N/A
Labour	Peter Mason	2,856	63.4	N/A
Conservative	Avtar Chand	803	17.8	N/A
Conservative	Mohammed Khan	727	16.1	N/A
Conservative	Arif Shekh	657	14.6	N/A
Green	Matt Chadburn	270	6.0	N/A
EIN	Sufiyan Abdul-Qayum	254	5.6	N/A
Liberal Democrats	Alison Cross	241	5.3	N/A
EIN	Amrik Mahi	235	5.2	N/A
EIN	David Marsden	223	4.9	N/A
Liberal Democrats	Lewis Hill	133	3.0	N/A
Liberal Democrats	Derk Groen	130	2.9	N/A
Turnout		4,507	42.80	
Labour hold				
Labour hold				
Labour hold				

=== Southall West ===
Southall West (2 seats)
Party	Candidate	Votes	%	±%
Labour	Surinder Jassal	1,197	57.5	N/A
Labour	Faduma Mohamed	990	47.6	N/A
Conservative	Mohammad Miah	404	19.4	N/A
Independent	Mohammad Amin	347	16.7	N/A
Conservative	Bishnu Carter	271	13.0	N/A
EIN	Joe Bhangu	207	10.0	N/A
Green	Nicholas Chapman	141	6.8	N/A
EIN	Ray Crossfield	141	6.8	N/A
Liberal Democrats	Nigel Bliss	91	4.4	N/A
Liberal Democrats	Rainer Hersch	68	3.3	N/A
Turnout		2,080	45.07	
Labour win (new seat)				
Labour win (new seat)				

=== Southfield ===
Southfield (3 seats)
Party	Candidate	Votes	%	±%
Liberal Democrats	Gary Malcolm	2,614	51.6	N/A
Liberal Democrats	Andrew Steed	2,585	51.0	N/A
Liberal Democrats	Gary Busuttil	2,552	50.4	N/A
Labour	Sophie Charman-Blower	1,310	25.9	N/A
Labour	Chris Green	1,022	20.2	N/A
Labour	Tamoor Malik	967	19.1	N/A
Conservative	Crystal Eisinger	916	18.1	N/A
Green	Mike Landon	886	17.5	N/A
Conservative	Anthony Garrick	883	17.4	N/A
Conservative	Darryll Coates	854	16.9	N/A
Turnout		5,065	44.17	
Liberal Democrats hold				
Liberal Democrats hold				
Liberal Democrats hold				

=== Walpole ===
Walpole (3 seats)
Party	Candidate	Votes	%	±%
Labour	Binda Rai	2,085	40.7	N/A
Labour	Grace Quansah	2,074	40.5	N/A
Labour	Gareth Shaw	2,024	39.5	N/A
Conservative	John Cowing	1,415	27.6	N/A
Conservative	Isobel Grant	1,414	27.6	N/A
Conservative	Monika Williams	1,263	24.7	N/A
Liberal Democrats	Mark Andrews	1,018	19.9	N/A
Liberal Democrats	Matthew Mellor	871	17.0	N/A
Liberal Democrats	Jonathan Ward	786	15.3	N/A
Green	Emmanuel Valentine	725	14.2	N/A
Green	Barry Greenan	709	13.8	N/A
Green	Aaran Murch	591	11.5	N/A
Turnout		5,121	50.36	
Labour hold				
Labour hold				
Labour hold				

== By-elections ==
The following by-elections took place between the 2022 and 2026 elections:

- 2024 Hanger Hill by-election (Liberal Democrats gain from Conservative)
- 2024 Northolt Mandeville by-election
- 2024 South Acton by-election

=== Hanger Hill ===
Hanger Hill: 10 October 2024
Party	Candidate	Votes	%	±%
Liberal Democrats	Jonathan Oxley	1,655	52.3	+19.3
Conservative	Sean Hanrahan	814	25.7	–5.3
Labour	Guneet Singh Malik	315	10.0	–13.2
Green	Kate Crossland	245	7.7	–5.1
Reform	Fabio Pukaj	98	3.1	N/A
Workers Party	Wagdi Thabit	35	1.1	N/A
Majority		841	26.6	N/A
Turnout		3,168	28.2	–13.7
Registered electors		11,253		
Liberal Democrats gain from Conservative		Swing	▲12.3	

=== Northolt Mandeville ===
Northolt Mandeville: 10 October 2024
Party	Candidate	Votes	%	±%
Labour	Dominic Moffitt	1,126	44.7	–10.3
Conservative	Andrew Bailey	730	29.0	+2.5
Reform	Conrad Lewandowski	271	10.8	N/A
Green	Natalia Kubica	199	7.9	–3.9
Liberal Democrats	Pedro da Conceicao	114	4.5	–2.2
Workers Party	Elyateb Omima	80	3.2	N/A
Majority		396	15.7	N/A
Turnout		2,532	21.4	–15.7
Registered electors		11,824		
Labour hold		Swing	▼6.4	

=== South Acton ===
South Acton: 10 October 2024
Party	Candidate	Votes	%	±%
Labour	Katie Douglas	1,009	48.5	+0.1
Conservative	Kristian Mower	303	14.6	–0.4
Green	Andrew Walkley	287	13.8	–5.5
Liberal Democrats	Timothy Hughes	208	10.0	–1.5
Reform	Marco Manassero	159	7.6	N/A
Independent	Julie Carter	65	3.1	N/A
Workers Party	Lucas Davies	32	1.5	N/A
TUSC	David Hofman	18	0.9	–1.2
Majority		706	33.9	N/A
Turnout		2,089	17.3	–17.5
Registered electors		12,047		
Labour hold		Swing	▲0.3	
