= 1990 Ealing London Borough Council election =

1990 local election in England

- 3 May 1990

All 70 seats to Ealing London Borough Council 36 seats needed for a majority
- Registered: 207,216
- Turnout: 101,491, 48.98%

	First party	Second party	Third party
Party	Conservative	Labour	Liberal Democrats
Last election	19	47 seats	3
Seats before	24	44	2
Seats won	40	30 (Note: Results include those from candidates listed as Labour and Co-operative Party)	0 (Note: Includes results from candidates listed as belonging to the Liberal Democratic Focus Team)
Seat change	▲16	▼14	▼2
Popular vote	126,670	120,064	23,476
Percentage	46.08%	43.68%	8.54%
Council control before election
Labour
Council control after election
Conservative

The 1990 Ealing Council election took place on 3 May 1990 to elect members of Ealing London Borough Council in London, England. The whole council was up for election and the Conservative party gained overall control of the council.

== Election result ==
1990 Ealing London Borough Council elections
Party	Seats	Gains	Losses	Net gain/loss	Seats %	Votes %	Votes	+/−
Conservative	40	17	1	▲16	57.14	45.70	126,670	
Labour	30	1	15	▼14	42.86	44.14	122,327	
Liberal Democrats	0	0	2	▼2	0.00	8.47	23,476	
Green	0	0	0	Steady	0.00	1.65	4,582	
Socialist (GB)	0	0	0	Steady	0.00	0.04	109	
Total	70						277,164	

== Ward results ==
(*) - indicates an incumbent candidate

(†) - indicates an incumbent candidate who has changed constituencies since the last election

=== Argyle ===
Argyle (3)
Party	Candidate	Votes	%
Conservative	Joan Ansell*	2,622	53.20
Conservative	Henry Allen*	2,589	
Conservative	John Wood*	2,561	
Labour	Gwendolen Barnes	1,522	30.21
Labour	Douglas Hardy	1,455	
Labour	Anna Harris	1,437	
Liberal Democrats	Roger Davies	468	8.54
Liberal Democrats	Paul Kitchener	409	
Green	Astra Seibe	392	8.05
Liberal Democrats	David Skelton	371	
Registered electors		9,756	
Turnout		4890	50.12
Rejected ballots		9	0.18
Conservative hold			
Conservative hold			
Conservative hold			

=== Costons ===
Costons (3)
Party	Candidate	Votes	%
Conservative	Edith Hetherington	2,215	55.96
Conservative	Graham Weeks	2,130	
Conservative	Jeremy Mindell	2,107	
Labour	Graham Nickson	1,434	36.13
Labour	Keith Fraser	1,411	
Labour	Edward Riley	1,321	
Liberal Democrats	Antonio Gracias	321	7.91
Liberal Democrats	Peter CD.	309	
Liberal Democrats	Norah Grajnert	281	
Registered electors		8,029	
Turnout		4127	51.40
Rejected ballots		10	0.24
Conservative gain from Labour			
Conservative gain from Labour			
Conservative gain from Labour			

=== Dormers Wells ===
Dormers Wells (3)
Party	Candidate	Votes	%
Labour	Honor Graham^{†} (Note: Graham was a sitting councillor representing the Glebe ward)	2,215	52.17
Labour	Virendra Sharma*	2,181	
Labour	Panadure Perera^{†} (Note: Perera was a sitting councillor representing the Northcote ward)	1,871	
Conservative	Niranjan Mangat	1,259	30.47
Conservative	Kusum Gibbons	1,203	
Conservative	Abdie Richardson	1,197	
Green	John Peck	417	10.42
Liberal Democrats	Robert Jones	304	6.94
Liberal Democrats	Kathleen Thomas	251	
Registered electors		8,828	
Turnout		4062	46.01
Rejected ballots		3	0.07
Labour hold			
Labour hold			
Labour hold			

=== Ealing Common ===
Ealing Common (3)
Party	Candidate	Votes	%
Conservative	Jennifer Baker*	2,499	53.19
Conservative	John Green	2,491	
Conservative	Kenneth Kettle*	2,460	
Labour	John Kearns	1,291	26.11
Labour	Amanda Norrie	1,207	
Labour	John Quinn	1,160	
Green	Stephen Cole	510	10.93
Liberal Democrats	Charles Cotton	504	9.77
Liberal Democrats	Simon Rowley	441	
Liberal Democrats	Eric Michael	424	
Registered electors		9,392	
Turnout		4473	47.63
Rejected ballots		3	0.07
Conservative hold			
Conservative hold			
Conservative hold			

=== Elthorne ===
Elthorne (3)
Party	Candidate	Votes	%
Labour	Neil Richardson	1,921	39.68
Labour	Margaret Majumdar*	1,894	
Labour	Shabira Moledina	1,779	
Conservative	Ernest Davis	1,731	36.00
Conservative	Robert Darke	1,693	
Conservative	Christopher Forster	1,652	
Green	Luke Fitz Herbert	702	14.94
Liberal Democrats	Oliver Murphy	508	9.38
Liberal Democrats	Susan Grajnert	374	
Registered electors		9,408	
Turnout		4416	46.94
Rejected ballots		14	0.32
Labour hold			
Labour hold			
Labour hold			

=== Glebe ===
Glebe (3)
Party	Candidate	Votes	%
Labour	Bachitter Sahota*	3,020	86.09
Labour	Rabindara Pathak*	3,015	
Labour	Umesh Chander	2,969	
Conservative	Harmeet Virk	506	13.91
Conservative	Harjinder Lotay	492	
Conservative	Harnam Azad	458	
Registered electors		8,958	
Turnout		3799	42.41
Rejected ballots		32	0.84
Labour hold			
Labour hold			
Labour hold			

=== Hanger Lane ===
Hanger Lane (3)
Party	Candidate	Votes	%
Conservative	Norman Pointing*	2,942	68.38
Conservative	William Hammett*	2,933	
Conservative	Ian Potts*	2,865	
Labour	Richard Hall	938	21.55
Labour	Simon Dougall	916	
Labour	Lawrence Whelan	901	
Liberal Democrats	Rowland Anthony	464	10.07
Liberal Democrats	Francis Salaun	393	
Registered electors		8,809	
Turnout		4354	49.43
Rejected ballots		16	0.37
Conservative hold			
Conservative hold			
Conservative hold			

=== Heathfield ===
Heathfield (3)
Party	Candidate	Votes	%
Labour	John Cudmore*	2,135	48.63
Labour	Elizabeth Brookes	2,008	
Labour	Yvonne Johnson*	1,919	
Conservative	Patricia Young	1,484	34.91
Conservative	Michael Allmond	1,472	
Conservative	Alistair Mitchell	1,397	
Green	Oliver Hitch	425	10.23
Liberal Democrats	Felix Dodds	311	6.23
Liberal Democrats	Andrew Mumford	249	
Liberal Democrats	Krystyna Viollot	216	
Registered electors		9,318	
Turnout		4230	45.40
Rejected ballots		9	0.21
Labour hold			
Labour hold			
Labour hold			

=== Hobbayne ===
Hobbayne (3)
Party	Candidate	Votes	%
Conservative	Derek Lewis* (Note: Lewis replaced Cllr Francis Curtiis after their resignation in 1988/9)	1,880	42.07
Conservative	Eric Black	1,852	
Labour	Stephen Pound*	1,813	39.93
Conservative	Wilfred Stiff	1,743	
Labour	Stephen Sears^{†} (Note: Sears was a sitting councillor representing the Costons ward)	1,717	
Labour	Wiktor Moszczynski^{†} (Note: Moszczynski was a sitting councillor representing the Costons ward)	1,666	
Green	Katrin Fitz Herbert	453	10.44
Liberal Democrats	Olive Douglas	349	7.56
Liberal Democrats	Helen McKay	348	
Liberal Democrats	Peter Watson	286	
Registered electors		8,454	
Turnout		4284	50.67
Rejected ballots		7	0.16
Conservative hold			
Conservative gain from Labour			
Labour hold			

=== Mandeville ===
Mandeville (3)
Party	Candidate	Votes	%
Conservative	Peter Downham	2,210	53.80
Conservative	Charles Richards	2,167	
Conservative	Joan Trinder	2,159	
Labour	Kenneth Acock*	1,647	37.68
Labour	Malcolm Ede^{†} (Note: Ede was a sitting councillor representing the Ravenor ward)	1,493	
Labour	Anthony Oliver^{†} (Note: Oliver was a sitting councillor representing the Costons ward)	1,438	
Liberal Democrats	Alan Miller	374	8.52
Liberal Democrats	Cynthia Miller	362	
Liberal Democrats	Myer Salaman	300	
Registered electors		8,379	
Turnout		4294	51.25
Rejected ballots		4	0.09
Conservative gain from Labour			
Conservative gain from Labour			
Conservative gain from Labour			

=== Mount Pleasant ===
Mount Pleasant (3)
Party	Candidate	Votes	%
Labour	Leigh Farrow	2,581	72.89
Labour	Sukhvinder Hothi*	2,459	
Labour	Madhavrao Patil*	2,301	
Conservative	Tirlochan Grewal	768	20.55
Conservative	William Patterson	734	
Conservative	Fazlur Quadri	569	
Liberal Democrats	Ethel Pearson	258	6.55
Liberal Democrats	Izhaq Sabharwal	181	
Registered electors		9,317	
Turnout		3683	39.53
Rejected ballots		33	0.90
Labour hold			
Labour hold			
Labour hold			

=== Northcote ===
Northcote (3)
Party	Candidate	Votes	%
Labour	Tara Dyal	2,993	91.82
Labour	Chanan Lachar	2,972	
Labour	Ram Perdesi	2,927	
Conservative	Peter Clark	271	8.18
Conservative	Narindar Meyon	270	
Conservative	Delwynne Angunawela	250	
Registered electors		7,898	
Turnout		3482	44.09
Rejected ballots		21	0.60
Labour hold			
Labour hold			
Labour hold			

=== Northfield ===
Northfield (3)
Party	Candidate	Votes	%
Conservative	Graham Bull*	2,372	43.08
Conservative	Wiktor Lewanski* (Note: Lewanski replaced Cllr John Collisson after his resignation in 1989)	2,346	
Conservative	Robert Hetherington*	2,339	
Labour	Steven Cowan	2,107	37.11
Labour	Richard Dennis	2,013	
Labour	John McDonald	1,958	
Green	Anthony Agius	634	11.61
Liberal Democrats	Frances Hurst	486	8.20
Liberal Democrats	Rosalie Lambert	436	
Liberal Democrats	John James	422	
Registered electors		9,649	
Turnout		5258	54.49
Rejected ballots		10	0.19
Conservative hold			
Conservative hold			
Conservative hold			

=== Perivale ===
Perivale (3)
Party	Candidate	Votes	%
Conservative	David Freeman*	2,492	52.72
Conservative	Martin Mallam*	2,406	
Conservative	Barbara Yerolemou	2,290	
Labour	Richard Porter	1,761	37.69
Labour	Tej Bagha	1,702	
Labour	Inderjeet Nijhar	1,676	
Liberal Democrats	Eamonn Kilduff	442	9.59
Liberal Democrats	John Ducker	440	
Liberal Democrats	Brian Cummings	425	
Registered electors		9,276	
Turnout		4917	53.01
Rejected ballots		7	0.14
Conservative hold			
Conservative hold			
Conservative hold			

=== Pitshanger ===
Pitshanger (3)
Party	Candidate	Votes	%
Conservative	Anthony Young*	3,447	67.48
Conservative	Donald Gordon*	3,319	
Conservative	Diana Pagan	3,294	
Labour	Leonora Lloyd	1,094	21.41
Labour	William Meldrum	1,093	
Labour	Harbhajan Grewal	1,006	
Liberal Democrats	Anne Wilson	628	11.11
Liberal Democrats	Rusi Dalal	475	
Registered electors		9,432	
Turnout		5104	54.11
Rejected ballots		15	0.29
Conservative hold			
Conservative hold			
Conservative hold			

=== Ravenor ===
Ravenor (3)
Party	Candidate	Votes	%
Conservative	Simon McVicker	2,234	48.91
Conservative	Michael Price	2,228	
Conservative	Vladimir Kopecky	2,215	
Labour	Michael Lewis*	1,983	40.89
Labour	Frederick Varley	1,842	
Labour	Leon Turini	1,759	
Liberal Democrats	Roger Abbis	464	10.20
Registered electors		8,946	
Turnout		4705	52.59
Rejected ballots		14	0.30
Conservative gain from Labour			
Conservative gain from Labour			
Conservative gain from Labour			

=== Southfield ===
Southfield (3)
Party	Candidate	Votes	%
Conservative	Martha Ebenezer*	1,574	36.07
Conservative	Timothy Atkinson	1,568	
Conservative	Philip Richardson*	1,568	
Labour	Patricia Hill	1,295	27.70
Labour	Jack Tattersall	1,254	
Lib Dem Focus Team	Harvey Rose	1,089	23.89
Labour Co-op	Colin Bastin	1,069	
Lib Dem Focus Team	Angus Huck	1,031	
Lib Dem Focus Team	Michael Lourie	1,000	
Green	Michael Landon	501	11.51
Socialist (GB)	Adam Buick	41	0.83
Socialist (GB)	Ralph Critchfield	37	
Socialist (GB)	Kevin Cronin	31	
Registered electors		8,138	
Turnout		4369	53.69
Rejected ballots		5	0.11
Conservative hold			
Conservative hold			
Conservative hold			

=== Springfield ===
Springfield (3)
Party	Candidate	Votes	%
Labour	John Gallagher*	1,830	39.50
Conservative	William Hill	1,825	39.54
Labour	Andrew Bond	1,778	
Conservative	Nigel Sumner	1,755	
Conservative	Angela Lynchehaun-Emmett	1,681	
Labour	Edward Melson*	1,648	
Green	Frances Hitch	548	12.35
Liberal Democrats	Stephen Blake	398	8.61
Liberal Democrats	Fiona Grabowski	365	
Registered electors		8,888	
Turnout		4268	48.02
Rejected ballots		5	0.12
Labour hold			
Conservative gain from Labour			
Labour hold			

=== Vale ===
Vale (2)
Party	Candidate	Votes	%
Labour	Patricia Seers*	1,156	47.56
Labour	David Smith*	1,065	
Conservative	Guy Ambler	1,029	41.35
Conservative	Harbans Singh	902	
Liberal Democrats	Mary Slater	259	11.09
Registered electors		5,224	
Turnout		2402	45.98
Rejected ballots		8	0.33
Labour hold			
Labour hold			

=== Victoria ===
Victoria (2)
Party	Candidate	Votes	%
Labour	Phillip Portwood*	1,277	51.07
Conservative	Anthony John	1,151	48.93
Conservative	Ian Gibb	1,126	
Labour Co-op	Nigel Smith*	1,101	
Registered electors		5,174	
Turnout		2501	48.34
Rejected ballots		17	0.68
Labour hold			
Conservative gain from Labour Co-op			

=== Walpole ===
Walpole (3)
Party	Candidate	Votes	%
Labour	Hilary Benn*	2,391	46.51
Labour	Alan Chorley*	2,263	
Conservative	Ian Green	2,144	42.49
Conservative	David Millican	2,073	
Labour	Claire Villaruel	2,070	
Conservative	Harbanms Devsi	1,924	
Liberal Democrats	Susan Kendrick	570	11.00
Liberal Democrats	Michael Brady	553	
Liberal Democrats	Louise Mutton	467	
Registered electors		9,719	
Turnout		5188	53.38
Rejected ballots		10	0.19
Labour hold			
Labour hold			
Conservative gain from Labour			

=== Waxlow ===
Waxlow (3)
Party	Candidate	Votes	%
Labour	JulClements-Elliott*	2,034	55.31
Labour	Royston Price	1,930	
Labour	Gurcharan Singh*	1,927	
Conservative	Eileen Harris* (Note: Harris replaced Cllr Percival Sennett after his resignation in 1988)	1,695	44.69
Conservative	Anthony Nolder	1,555	
Conservative	Mihael Pack	1,510	
Registered electors		8,921	
Turnout		4112	46.09
Rejected ballots		38	0.92
Labour gain from Conservative			
Labour hold			
Labour hold			

=== West End ===
West End (3)
Party	Candidate	Votes	%
Labour	Ernest Dunckley*	1,840	44.78
Conservative	James Heydinrych	1,732	44.88
Conservative	David Varney	1,711	
Conservative	Rita Sherry	1,691	
Labour	Frank Impey*	1,679	
Labour	Peter Maguire	1,603	
Liberal Democrats	Stephen Bown	425	10.34
Liberal Democrats	Mary Scanlan	363	
Registered electors		9,047	
Turnout		4149	45.86
Rejected ballots		5	0.12
Labour hold			
Conservative gain from Labour			
Conservative gain from Labour			

=== Wood End ===
Wood End (3)
Party	Candidate	Votes	%
Conservative	Brenda Hall* (Note: Hall replaced Cllr Angela Ilbrey after their resignation in 1988)	1,883	44.64
Conservative	Diane Varney	1,842	
Conservative	Stewart Jackson	1,818	
Lib Dem Focus Team	Lyn Woodcock	1,284	29.64
Lib Dem Focus Team	Anthony Miller*	1,226	
Lib Dem Focus Team	Dennis Taylor	1,172	
Labour	Neal Underwood	1,112	25.72
Labour	Raymond Chudley	1,097	
Labour	Navjot Sidhu	987	
Registered electors		8,436	
Turnout		4424	52.44
Rejected ballots		5	0.11
Conservative hold			
Conservative gain from Lib Dem Focus Team			
Conservative gain from Lib Dem Focus Team			
