= 1998 Ealing London Borough Council election =

1998 local election in England

- May 7, 1998

All 69 seats up for election to Ealing London Borough Council 35 seats needed for a majority
- Registered: 210,753
- Turnout: 70,523, 33.46% (▼16.07)

	First party	Second party
Leader	John L. Cudmore	Unknown
Party	Labour	Conservative
Leader since	1994	Unknown
Leader's seat	Heathfield	Unknown
Last election	48 seats, 49.34%	20 seats, 39.51%
Seats before	47	19
Seats won	53	15
Seat change	▲5	▼5
Popular vote	91,714	58,025
Percentage	50.43%	31.91%
Swing	▲1.09	▼7.60
	Third party	Fourth party
Leader	Unknown	Neal G. Underwood (Note: As the Green Party's only councillor he was the defacto leader of the Green Party in Ealing Council)
Party	Liberal Democrats	Green
Leader since	Unknown	Unknown
Leader's seat	Unknown	Mandeville (lost)
Last election	3 seats, 9.45%	0 seats 1.35%
Seats before	3	1
Seats won	3	0
Seat change	Steady	Steady
Popular vote	22,552	6,495
Percentage	12.40	3.57%
Swing	▲2.95	▲2.22
Council control before election
Labour
Council control after election
Labour

The 1998 Ealing Council election took place on 7 May 1998 to elect members of Ealing London Borough Council in London, England. The whole council was up for election and the Labour party stayed in overall control of the council.

== Background ==
The composition of the council didn't change much since the election in 1994.

There were four by-elections, with only the Argyle by-election resulting in a seat changing parties, with it changing from Conservative to Labour. In addition to these by-elections, Cllr. Neal G. Underwood changed allegiance from Labour to the Green Party and one seat was left vacant shortly before the 1998 election.

As a result of these changes, the composition of the council just before the election was as follows:

↓
47	1	3	19	1
Labour	Green	LD	Con	Vacant

== Election result ==
1998 Ealing London Borough Council Elections
Party	Seats	Gains	Losses	Net gain/loss	Seats %	Votes %	Votes	+/−
Labour	53	6	1	▲5	74.65	50.43	91,714	▲1.09
Conservative	15	1	6	▼5	21.13	31.91	58,025	▼7.60
Liberal Democrats	3	0	0	Steady	4.22	12.40	22,552	▲2.95
Green	0	0	0	Steady	0.00	3.57	6,495	▲2.22
Socialist Labour	0	0	0	Steady	0.00	1.69	3,066	New
Total	71							

The election was a victory for the ruling Labour Party, increasing the number of seats they held by five. The Green Party lost its only seat, which it had gained through a defection in the intervening years, with Labour regaining the seat.

After the election the composition of the council was as follows:

↓
53	3	15
Labour	LD	Con

== Ward results ==
(*) - Indicates an incumbent candidate

(†) - Indicates an incumbent candidate standing in a different ward

=== Argyle ===
Argyle (3)
Party	Candidate	Votes	%	±%
Conservative	Joan Ansell*	1,516	42.77	▼1.60
Conservative	Ian Gibb*	1,405		
Conservative	Brian Castle	1,365		
Labour	Patricia Seers^{†} (Note: Seers was a sitting councillor representing the Vale ward)	1,324	34.86	▲1.28
Labour	Harbans Anand^{†} (Note: Anand was a sitting councillor representing the Waxlow ward)	1,086		
Labour	Renu Sharma	1,083		
Liberal Democrats	Roger Davies	649	14.34	▲0.99
Liberal Democrats	Simon Rowley	469		
Liberal Democrats	Rusi Dalai	319		
Green	Astra Seibe	268	8.02	▼0.68
Registered electors		9,465		▲337
Turnout		3,487	36.84	▼12.93
Rejected ballots		21	0.60	▲0.51
Conservative hold				
Conservative hold				
Conservative hold				

=== Costons ===
Costons (3)
Party	Candidate	Votes	%	±%
Labour	Laurence Evans	1,371	44.92	▲7.29
Conservative	Edith Hetherington*	1,255	42.80	▼8.78
Labour	Swarn Kang	1,153		
Labour	Alan Mathison	1,136		
Conservative	Graham Weeks*	1,127		
Conservative	Jason Stacey	1,106		
Liberal Democrats	Olive Douglas	405	12.28	▲1.49
Liberal Democrats	Madeliene Jay	262		
Registered electors		8,152		▲473
Turnout		2,991	36.69	▼12.65
Rejected ballots		18	0.60	▲0.39
Labour gain from Conservative				
Conservative hold				
Labour gain from Conservative				

=== Dormers Wells ===
Dormers Wells (3)
Party	Candidate	Votes	%	±%
Labour	Rajinder Mann*	1,625	60.07	▲1.72
Labour	Surinder Varma	1,534		
Labour	Mohammad Aslam	1,532		
Conservative	William Patterson	488	17.56	▼15.28
Conservative	Barbara Oliver	466		
Conservative	Jane Perry	417		
Liberal Democrats	Susan Kendrick	337	11.62	▲2.81
Green	Sarah Rapley	280	10.76	New
Liberal Democrats	Michael Olive	268		
Registered electors		9,890		▼1,053
Turnout		2,821	28.52	▼19.14
Rejected ballots		15	0.53	▲0.17
Labour hold				
Labour hold				
Labour hold				

=== Ealing Common ===
Ealing Common (3)
Party	Candidate	Votes	%	±%
Conservative	Anthony Brown*	1,232	38.52	▼7.48
Conservative	Ian Green*	1,230		
Conservative	Eileen Harris	1,165		
Labour	Alan Jones	1,073	29.66	▲1.96
Labour	Benjamin Royappa	884		
Labour	Trapti Bartia	836		
Liberal Democrats	Nikki Thomson	732	20.70	▲6.08
Liberal Democrats	Jon Ball	687		
Liberal Democrats	John Maycock	530		
Green	Peter Burton	349	11.12	▲4.59
Registered electors		10,031		▲984
Turnout		3,139	31.29	▼15.80
Rejected ballots		17	0.54	▲0.45
Conservative hold				
Conservative hold				
Conservative hold				

=== Elthorne ===
Elthorne (3)
Party	Candidate	Votes	%	±%
Labour	Julia Clements-Elliot^{†} (Note: Clements-Elliot was a sitting councillor representing the Waxlow ward)	1,498	53.50	▲3.97
Labour	Edward Coleman*	1,437		
Labour	Margaret Majumdar*	1,323		
Conservative	Niranjan Mangal	587	21.23	▼14.06
Conservative	William Perry	570		
Conservative	Russel Simpson	533		
Green	Sebastian Diamond	409	14.07	▼1.11
Green	Deborah Miles	398		
Green	Christopher Spruce	313		
Liberal Democrats	Christopher Pidoux	312	11.20	New
Liberal Democrats	Michael Pidoux	282		
Registered electors		9,208		▲615
Turnout		2,867	31.14	▼15.68
Rejected ballots		37	1.29	▲1.07
Labour hold				
Labour hold				
Labour hold				

=== Glebe ===
Glebe (3)
Party	Candidate	Votes	%	±%
Labour	Jasbir Anand	2,018	70.57	▼2.99
Labour	Umesh Chander*	1,962		
Labour	Rabindara Pathak*	1,916		
Socialist Labour	Resham Samra	310	10.43	New
Socialist Labour	David Morgan	271		
Conservative	Iris Forster	240	7.42	▼8.52
Conservative	Noreen Gibson	214		
Green	Nicholas Goodwin	185	6.64	▼3.85
Conservative	Myrtle Marshall	166		
Liberal Democrats	Robert Jones	139	4.94	New
Liberal Democrats	Paul Gooch	136		
Registered electors		9,195		▲540
Turnout		2,771	30.14	▼16.06
Rejected ballots		21	0.76	▲0.23
Labour hold				
Labour hold				
Labour hold				

=== Hanger Lane ===
Hanger Lane (3)
Party	Candidate	Votes	%	±%
Conservative	Barbara Yerolemou*	1,388	50.77	▼11.51
Conservative	Ian Potts*	1,351		
Conservative	Nigel Sumner*	1,317		
Labour	Sherrel Brett	937	32.75	▲8.16
Labour	Vijay Amin	848		
Labour	Keith Fraser^{†} (Note: Fraser was a sitting councillor representing the Victoria ward)	832		
Liberal Democrats	Dorothy Brooks	506	16.48	▲3.35
Liberal Democrats	Michael O'Connor	419		
Liberal Democrats	Francis Salaun	392		
Registered electors		9,249		▲925
Turnout		2,883	31.17	▼15.71
Rejected ballots		28	0.97	▲0.59
Conservative hold				
Conservative hold				
Conservative hold				

=== Heathfield ===
Heathfield (3)
Party	Candidate	Votes	%	±%
Labour	Elizabeth Brookes*	1,467	62.33	▲2.05
Labour	John Cudmore*	1,452		
Labour	Yvonne Johnson*	1,415		
Conservative	Sheila Brown	622	23.30	▼5.19
Conservative	John Peach	539		
Conservative	Jamal Khan	459		
Liberal Democrats	Raymond Alcock	375	14.37	▲3.14
Liberal Democrats	Nicholas Winkfield	356		
Liberal Democrats	Hugo Studholme	268		
Registered electors		8,841		▲492
Turnout		2,599	29.40	▼15.38
Rejected ballots		23	0.88	▲0.64
Labour hold				
Labour hold				
Labour hold				

=== Hobbayne ===
Hobbayne (3)
Party	Candidate	Votes	%	±%
Labour	Phyllis Greenhead	1,468	56.09	▲6.64
Labour	Stephen Sears*	1,453		
Labour	Royston Price*	1,274		
Conservative	Tim Frost	618	23.67	▼8.47
Conservative	Miranda Oakley	608		
Conservative	Alison Frost	544		
Liberal Democrats	Alison Harvey	318	11.59	▲1.35
Liberal Democrats	Alan Miller	260		
Green	Katrin Fitzherbert	260	8.65	▲0.48
Green	Luke Fitzherbert	201		
Green	Brian Outten	186		
Registered electors		8,178		▲369
Turnout		2,687	32.86	▼20.16
Rejected ballots		29	1.08	▲0.79
Labour hold				
Labour hold				
Labour hold				

=== Horsenden ===
Horsenden (2)
Party	Candidate	Votes	%	±%
Labour	Frederick Varley*	1,218	54.14	▲13.91
Labour	Shital Manro	1,140		
Conservative	David Freeman*	840	37.11	▼3.49
Conservative	Martin Mallam	776		
Liberal Democrats	Ann Wilson	193	8.75	▼10.42
Liberal Democrats	Vera Hankinson	188		
Registered electors		5,665		▲325
Turnout		2,371	41.85	▼13.11
Rejected ballots		17	0.72	▲0.38
Labour hold				
Labour gain from Conservative				

=== Mandeville ===
Mandeville (3)
Party	Candidate	Votes	%	±%
Labour	Brian Reeves	1,159	41.37	▼12.16
Labour	Neill Richardson	1,052		
Conservative	Peter Downham	1,017	38.24	▼8.23
Conservative	Joan Trinder	991		
Labour	Robert Khan	961		
Conservative	Allan Ilsley	924		
Green	Neal Underwood* (Note: Underwood was originally elected as a Labour Councillor but later defected to the Green Party)	507	14.69	New
Green	Steven Brown	330		
Green	Meike Lawrence	289		
Liberal Democrats	Dietlinde Hatherall	162	5.69	New
Liberal Democrats	Myer Salaman	129		
Registered electors		7,848		▼2
Turnout		2,762	35.19	▼16.90
Rejected ballots		16	0.58	▼0.03
Labour hold				
Labour hold				
Conservative gain from Labour				

=== Mount Pleasant ===
Mount Pleasant (3)
Party	Candidate	Votes	%	±%
Labour	Ranjit Dheer* (Note: Dheer was elected in a by-election triggered by the resignation of Cllr Jasbinder Birk)	1,520	66.55	▼11.42
Labour	Tej Bagha*	1,507		
Labour	Madhavrao Patil*	1,464		
Conservative	Shaukat Ali	320	13.00	▼9.03
Socialist Labour	Steven Cowan	315	12.71	New
Socialist Labour	Sukant Chandan	306		
Conservative	June Regan	281		
Conservative	George Lafford	276		
Socialist Labour	Iris Cremer	237		
Liberal Democrats	Kathleen Thomas	180	7.74	New
Liberal Democrats	Douglas Rundell	168		
Registered electors		9,354		▲507
Turnout		2,498	26.71	▼16.83
Rejected ballots		19	0.76	▲0.09
Labour hold				
Labour hold				
Labour hold				

=== Northcote ===
Northcote (3)
Party	Candidate	Votes	%	±%
Labour	Manjit Mahal* (Note: Mahal and Sahota were elected in a by-election triggered by the death of Cllr Chanan Lachhar and the resignation of Cllr Tara Dyal)	1,519	62.38	▼22.85
Labour	Gurdip Sahota*	1,327		
Labour	Ram Perdesi*	1,277		
Socialist Labour	Harpal Brar	606	24.62	New
Socialist Labour	Surinder Cheema	546		
Socialist Labour	Jagdev Samra	475		
Conservative	Joseph Harris	198	7.55	▼7.22
Conservative	Nina Bressey	168		
Conservative	Audrey Shaw	133		
Liberal Democrats	Lyn Woodcock	120	5.45	New
Registered electors		8,018		▲473
Turnout		2,433	30.34	▼14.78
Rejected ballots		26	1.07	▲0.22
Labour hold				
Labour hold				
Labour hold				

=== Northfield ===
Northfield (3)
Party	Candidate	Votes	%	±%
Labour	Joseph O'Neill*	1,484	44.23	▲1.91
Labour	Kieron Gavan*	1,478		
Labour	Simon Woodroofe*	1,414		
Conservative	David Scott	1,042	29.23	▼9.50
Conservative	Anita Kapoor	958		
Conservative	Harbans Devsi	892		
Liberal Democrats	Frances Hurst	582	15.50	▲2.99
Liberal Democrats	Peter Thornhill	518		
Liberal Democrats	Richard Gorbutt	433		
Green	Derek Allord-Brown	364	11.04	▲4.60
Registered electors		9,837		▲788
Turnout		3,830	38.93	▼17.70
Rejected ballots		29	0.76	▲0.60
Labour hold				
Labour hold				
Labour hold				

=== Perivale ===
Perivale (2)
Party	Candidate	Votes	%	±%
Labour	Christopher Payne*	1,197	50.22	▲4.06
Labour	Inderjeet Nijhar^{†} (Note: Nijhar was a sitting councillor representing the Elthorne ward)	1,128		
Conservative	Stewart Jackson^{†} (Note: Jackson was a sitting councillor representing the Wood End ward)	940	40.41	▼2.41
Conservative	David Gold	931		
Liberal Democrats	Brian Cummings	233	9.37	▼1.65
Liberal Democrats	John Ducker	201		
Registered electors		6,092		▲670
Turnout		2,547	41.81	▼10.07
Rejected ballots		20	0.79	▲0.58
Labour hold				
Labour gain from Conservative				

=== Pitshanger ===
Pitshanger (3)
Party	Candidate	Votes	%	±%
Conservative	Anthony Young*	1,809	46.24	▼9.71
Conservative	Dianna Pagan*	1,736		
Conservative	Audrey Hider*	1,668		
Labour	Ruddy Davis	1,038	25.99	▲3.20
Labour	Michael Fraenkel	987		
Labour	Michael Kilker	905		
Liberal Democrats	Brian Harris	707	16.81	▲2.00
Liberal Democrats	Francesco Fruzza	602		
Liberal Democrats	Paul Kitchener	586		
Green	John Ainsworth	412	10.96	▲4.51
Registered electors		9,553		▲460
Turnout		3,687	38.60	▼13.97
Rejected ballots		31	0.84	▲0.80
Conservative hold				
Conservative hold				
Conservative hold				

=== Ravenor ===
Ravenor (3)
Party	Candidate	Votes	%	±%
Labour	Diane Murray*	1,651	50.34	▲2.81
Labour	Jill Stokoe	1,356		
Labour	Leonara Thomson	1,322		
Conservative	William Brooks	1,183	39.67	▼3.17
Conservative	Vladimir Kopecky	1,125		
Conservative	Dorothy McGinty	1,103		
Liberal Democrats	Patrick Dee	304	9.99	▲0.36
Liberal Democrats	Oliver Murphy	269		
Registered electors		8,461		▲172
Turnout		3,103	36.67	▼18.15
Rejected ballots		29	0.93	▲0.57
Labour hold				
Labour hold				
Labour hold				

=== Southfield ===
Southfield (3)
Party	Candidate	Votes	%	±%
Liberal Democrats	Andrew Mitchell*	1,471	45.43	▲9.04
Liberal Democrats	Harvey Rose*	1,421		
Liberal Democrats	Kieran Ryan	1,366		
Labour	Colin Bastin	942	27.13	▼3.02
Labour	Francis Reedy	805		
Labour	Renu Singh	796		
Conservative	Ian Dunbar	686	21.68	▼9.25
Conservative	Gareth Williams	685		
Conservative	Paul Hill	661		
Green	Christina Meiklejohn	180	5.76	▲3.23
Registered electors		8,397		▲723
Turnout		3,362	40.04	▼12.29
Rejected ballots		11	0.33	▼0.09
Liberal Democrats hold				
Liberal Democrats hold				
Liberal Democrats hold				

=== Springfield ===
Springfield (3)
Party	Candidate	Votes	%	±%
Labour	John Delaney*	1,276	55.42	▲4.00
Labour	Stephen Donnelly	1,254		
Labour	Margaret Payne	1,207		
Conservative	Ellen Delaney	806	34.36	▼4.26
Conservative	Glenn Murphy	770		
Conservative	Mary Macleod	741		
Liberal Democrats	Edward Bailey	254	10.21	▲0.25
Liberal Democrats	Fiona Grabowski	236		
Liberal Democrats	Donald O'Connell	199		
Registered electors		8,854		▲674
Turnout		2,358	26.63	▼23.82
Rejected ballots		7	0.30	▲0.23
Labour hold				
Labour hold				
Labour hold				

=== Vale ===
Vale (2)
Party	Candidate	Votes	%	±%
Labour	Katherine Crawford	923	53.57	▲2.03
Labour	Judith Field	797		
Conservative	Roger Fox	497	29.87	▼8.65
Conservative	Christine Magnowska	462		
Liberal Democrats	Mary Slater	158	9.72	▼0.22
Liberal Democrats	Paul Joachim	154		
Green	Adam Porter	110	6.85	New
Registered electors		5,100		▲344
Turnout		1,693	33.20	▼14.80
Rejected ballots		18	1.06	▲0.53
Labour hold				
Labour hold				

=== Victoria ===
Victoria (2)
Party	Candidate	Votes	%	±%
Labour	Anthony Gray	1,007	61.94	▲7.78
Labour	Philip Portwood*	1,001		
Conservative	Janet Young	419	25.38	▼11.28
Conservative	Norma Haythorn	404		
Liberal Democrats	Donald Allwright	239	12.68	▲3.49
Liberal Democrats	Margaret Rose	172		
Registered electors		5,623		▲421
Turnout		1,765	31.39	▼13.67
Rejected ballots		10	0.57	▲0.44
Labour hold				
Labour hold				

=== Walpole ===
Walpole (3)
Party	Candidate	Votes	%	±%
Labour	Hilary Benn*	2,017	50.99	▲5.29
Labour	Peter Wicks	1,793		
Labour	Virendra Sharma^{†} (Note: Sharma was a sitting councillor representing the Dormers Wells ward)	1,743		
Conservative	Geoffrey Belson	884	23.09	▼12.53
Conservative	Sheila Day	831		
Conservative	Felix Rebello	800		
Liberal Democrats	Fiona Brooke	559	13.72	▼0.23
Liberal Democrats	John Mitchell	503		
Green	Margaret Dobson	443	12.20	New
Liberal Democrats	Elaine Revesz	432		
Registered electors		9,920		▲813
Turnout		3,678	37.08	▼16.49
Rejected ballots		23	0.63	▲0.51
Labour hold				
Labour hold				
Labour hold				

=== Waxlow ===
Waxlow (3)
Party	Candidate	Votes	%	±%
Labour	Gurcharan Singh*	1,534	58.24	▼5.08
Labour	Manjit Keith	1,509		
Labour	Kamaljit Dhindsa	1,507		
Conservative	Anthony Nolder	725	27.36	▼9.32
Conservative	Doreen Power	721		
Conservative	Michael Pack	691		
Liberal Democrats	Fay Edinborough	375	14.40	New
Registered electors		8,839		▼363
Turnout		2,653	30.01	▼16.14
Rejected ballots		23	0.87	▲0.54
Labour hold				
Labour hold				
Labour hold				

=== West End ===
West End (3)
Party	Candidate	Votes	%	±%
Labour	David Bond*	1,439	56.25	▲0.95
Labour	Ernest Dunckley*	1,338		
Labour	Frank Impey*	1,192		
Conservative	Susan Emment	678	26.64	▼7.20
Conservative	Avril Hyde	626		
Conservative	Kathryn Kent	576		
Liberal Democrats	Judith Ducker	251	9.80	▼1.05
Liberal Democrats	Ida Goodwin	210		
Green	Brian Gooch	204	7.31	New
Green	Alastair Perkins	140		
Registered electors		8,783		▲143
Turnout		2,542	28.94	▼17.76
Rejected ballots		20	0.79	▲0.64
Labour hold				
Labour hold				
Labour hold				

=== Wood End ===
Wood End (3)
Party	Candidate	Votes	%	±%
Labour	Richard Gordon	1,287	43.08	▲5.31
Conservative	Brenda Hall*	1,183	42.25	▲1.37
Labour	Richard Porter^{†} (Note: Porter was a sitting councillor representing the Ravenor ward)	1,179		
Conservative	Diane Varney*	1,175		
Conservative	Zena Laneryou	1,165		
Labour	Mark Karinski	1,127		
Green	Earnon Kilduff	261	8.00	New
Green	Lisa Kilduff	243		
Liberal Democrats	Helen McKay	225	6.67	▼3.99
Liberal Democrats	Anthony Miller	186		
Green	Anthony Agius	163		
Liberal Democrats	John Seymour	145		
Registered electors		8,200		▲429
Turnout		2,996	36.54	▼16.89
Rejected ballots		18	0.60	▲0.43
Labour gain from Conservative				
Conservative hold				
Labour gain from Conservative				
