= 1994 Ealing London Borough Council election =

1994 local election in England

- 5 May 1994

All 71 seats to Ealing London Borough Council 36 seats needed for a majority
- Registered: 197,662
- Turnout: 97,896, 49.53% (▼0.55)

	First party	Second party	Third party
Party	Labour	Conservative	Liberal Democrats
Last election	20 seats	40 seats	0 seats
Seats before	31	39	0
Seats won	48	20	3
Seat change	▲17	▼19	▲3
Popular vote	126,822	101,552	24,292
Percentage	49.34%	39.51%	9.45%
Swing	▲5.20	▼6.19	▲0.98
Council control before election
Conservative
Council control after election
Labour

The 1994 Ealing Council election took place on 5 May 1994 to elect members of Ealing London Borough Council in London, England. The whole council was up for election and the Labour Party gained overall control of the council.

== Election result ==
1994 Ealing London Borough Council local elections
Party	Seats	Gains	Losses	Net gain/loss	Seats %	Votes %	Votes	+/−
Labour	48	17	0	▲17	67.61	49.34	126,822	▲5.20
Conservative	20	1	20	▼19	28.17	39.51	101,552	▼6.19
Liberal Democrats	3	3	0	▲3	4.22	9.45	24,292	▲0.98
Green	0	0	0	Steady	0.00	1.35	3,481	▼0.30
Ind. Residents	0	0	0	Steady	0.00	0.21	526	New
Independent	0	0	0	Steady	0.00	0.14	356	New
Total	71						257,029	

== Ward results ==
(*) - Indicates an incumbent candidate

(†) - Indicates an incumbent candidate standing in a different ward

=== Argyle ===
Argyle (3)
Party	Candidate	Votes	%	±%
Conservative	Joan Ansell*	2,127	44.37	▼8.83
Conservative	Ian Gibb* (Note: Gibb replaced Cllr Henry Allen after his death in 1992)	2,056		
Conservative	John Wood*	2,049		
Labour	Douglas Hardy	1,658	33.58	▲3.37
Labour	Reginald Holmes	1,609		
Labour	Richard Tomlinson	1,450		
Liberal Democrats	Paul Kitchener	625	13.35	▲4.81
Green	Astrid Hilne	407	8.70	▲0.65
Registered electors		9,128		▼628
Turnout		4,543	49.77	▼0.35
Rejected ballots		4	0.09	▼0.09
Conservative hold				
Conservative hold				
Conservative hold				

=== Costons ===
Costons (3)
Party	Candidate	Votes	%	±%
Conservative	Edith Hetherington*	1,837	51.58	▼4.38
Conservative	Graham Weeks*	1,744		
Conservative	Jeremy Mindell*	1,712		
Labour	Bernard Evans	1,351	37.63	▲1.50
Labour	Michael Kilmer	1,330		
Labour	Alaudin Maherali	1,181		
Liberal Democrats	Derek Bromwich	433	10.79	▲2.88
Liberal Democrats	Antonio Gracias	372		
Liberal Democrats	Norah Grajnert	303		
Registered electors		7,679		▼350
Turnout		3,789	49.34	▼2.06
Rejected ballots		8	0.21	▼0.03
Conservative hold				
Conservative hold				
Conservative hold				

=== Dormers Wells ===
Dormers Wells (3)
Party	Candidate	Votes	%	±%
Labour	Virendra Sharma*	2,228	58.35	▲6.18
Labour	Rajinder Mann	2,117		
Labour	Iain McIntosh	1,994		
Conservative	Niranjan Mangat	1,266	32.84	▲2.37
Conservative	Donald Kay	1,176		
Conservative	Mohammad Aslam	1,124		
Liberal Democrats	Margaret Rose	365	8.81	▲1.87
Liberal Democrats	Kathleen Thomas	301		
Liberal Democrats	Rusi Dalal	292		
Registered electors		8,837		▲9
Turnout		4,212	47.66	▲1.65
Rejected ballots		15	0.36	▲0.29
Labour hold				
Labour hold				
Labour hold				

=== Ealing Common ===
Ealing Common (3)
Party	Candidate	Votes	%	±%
Conservative	Kenneth Kettle*	1,955	46.00	▼7.19
Conservative	Anthony Brown	1,922		
Conservative	Ian Green^{†} (Note: Green was a sitting councillor representing the Walpole ward)	1,891		
Labour	Alan Jones	1,328	27.70	▲1.59
Labour	Kundan Chaudhary	1,116		
Labour	Gurdhip Sahota	1,031		
Liberal Democrats	Jon Ball	635	14.62	▲4.85
Liberal Democrats	Harold Gibbs	616		
Liberal Democrats	Nicola Thomson	581		
Green	Peter Burton	315	6.53	▼4.40
Green	Douglas Earl	305		
Green	Astra Seibe	199		
Independent	Edward Leahy	129	3.09	New
Ind. Residents	Paul Sansford	86	2.06	New
Registered electors		9,047		▼345
Turnout		4,260	47.09	▼0.54
Rejected ballots		4	0.09	▲0.02
Conservative hold				
Conservative hold				
Conservative hold				

=== Elthorne ===
Elthorne (3)
Party	Candidate	Votes	%	±%
Labour	Edward Coleman	2,114	49.53	▲9.85
Labour	Margaret Majumdar*	1,968		
Labour	Inderjeet Nijhar	1,644		
Conservative	Ellen Delaney	1,487	35.29	▼0.71
Conservative	Henry Samuel	1,320		
Conservative	Victor Lewanski	1,272		
Green	Luke Fitzherbert	585	15.18	▲0.24
Registered electors		8,593		▼815
Turnout		4,023	46.82	▼0.12
Rejected ballots		9	0.22	▼0.10
Labour hold				
Labour hold				
Labour hold				

=== Glebe ===
Glebe (3)
Party	Candidate	Votes	%	±%
Labour	Umesh Chander*	2,847	73.56	▼12.53
Labour	Bachitter Sahota*	2,837		
Labour	Rabindara Pathak*	2,773		
Conservative	Abdul Chaudhry	672	15.94	▲2.03
Conservative	Shams-ul-Qamar Bhati	617		
Conservative	Dhanwant Ranshi	545		
Green	Nicholas Goodwin	402	10.49	New
Registered electors		8,655		
Turnout		3,999	46.20	▲3.79
Rejected ballots		21	0.53	▼0.31
Labour hold				
Labour hold				
Labour hold				

=== Hanger Lane ===
Hanger Lane (3)
Party	Candidate	Votes	%	±%
Conservative	Ian Potts*	2,360	62.28	▼6.10
Conservative	Nigel Sumner	2,256		
Conservative	Barbara Yerolemou^{†} (Note: Yerolemou was a sitting councillor representing the Perivale ward)	2,200		
Labour	Joan Baker	951	24.59	▲3.04
Labour	Amanda Norrie	875		
Labour	John Quinn	865		
Liberal Democrats	Rowland Anthony	521	13.13	▲3.06
Liberal Democrats	Dorothy Brooks	512		
Liberal Democrats	Francis Salaun	404		
Registered electors		8,324		▼485
Turnout		3,902	46.88	▼2.55
Rejected ballots		15	0.38	▲0.01
Conservative hold				
Conservative hold				
Conservative hold				

=== Heathfield ===
Heathfield (3)
Party	Candidate	Votes	%	±%
Labour	John Cudmore*	2,073	60.28	▲11.65
Labour	Elizabeth Brookes*	2,041		
Labour	Yvonne Johnson*	2,035		
Conservative	James Allison	1,109	28.49	▼6.42
Conservative	Jean-Marc Olivier	942		
Conservative	Ranbur Suri	855		
Liberal Democrats	Raymond Alcock	429	11.23	▲5.00
Liberal Democrats	Felix Dodds	390		
Liberal Democrats	Krystyna Villot	326		
Registered electors		8,349		▼969
Turnout		3,739	44.78	▼0.62
Rejected ballots		9	0.24	▲0.03
Labour hold				
Labour hold				
Labour hold				

=== Hobbayne ===
Hobbayne (3)
Party	Candidate	Votes	%	±%
Labour	Stephen Pound*	2,196	49.45	▲9.52
Labour	Stephen Sears	2,097		
Labour	Royston Price^{†} (Note: Price was a sitting councillor representing the Waxlow ward)	2,008		
Conservative	Eric Black*	1,411	32.14	▼9.93
Conservative	Derek Lewis*	1,359		
Conservative	Brian Castle	1,324		
Liberal Democrats	Alan Miller	445	10.24	▲2.68
Liberal Democrats	John Seymour	425		
Green	Katrin Fitzherbert	347	8.17	▼2.27
Registered electors		7,809		▼645
Turnout		4,140	53.02	▲2.35
Rejected ballots		12	0.29	▲0.13
Labour gain from Conservative				
Labour gain from Conservative				
Labour hold				

=== Horsenden ===
Horsenden (2)
Party	Candidate	Votes	%	±%
Labour	Frederick Varley	1,176	40.23	New
Conservative	David Freeman^{†} (Note: Freeman and Mallam were sitting councillors representing the Perivale ward)	1,147	40.60	New
Conservative	Martin Mallam^{†}	1,085		
Labour	Peter Ward	1,035		
Liberal Democrats	David Davies	566	19.17	New
Liberal Democrats	Alastair MacLachlan	487		
Registered electors		5,340		New
Turnout		2,935	54.96	New
Rejected ballots		10	0.34	New
Labour win (new seat)				
Conservative win (new seat)				

=== Mandeville ===
Mandeville (3)
Party	Candidate	Votes	%	±%
Labour	Raymond Chudley	2,031	53.53	▲15.85
Labour	Neal Underwood	2,012		
Labour	Vanessa Lemin	2,004		
Conservative	Peter Downham*	1,758	46.47	▼7.33
Conservative	Charles Richards*	1,751		
Conservative	Joan Trinder*	1,740		
Registered electors		7,850		▼529
Turnout		4,089	52.09	▲0.84
Rejected ballots		25	0.61	▲0.52
Labour gain from Conservative				
Labour gain from Conservative				
Labour gain from Conservative				

=== Mount Pleasant ===
Mount Pleasant (3)
Party	Candidate	Votes	%	±%
Labour	Jasbinder Birk	2,722	77.97	▲5.08
Labour	Tej Bagha	2,616		
Labour	Madhavrao Patil*	2,497		
Conservative	Mahabir Sandhu	783	22.03	▲1.48
Conservative	Arif Hayat	756		
Conservative	Fazlur-Rehman Quadri	674		
Registered electors		8,847		▼470
Turnout		3,852	43.54	▲4.01
Rejected ballots		26	0.67	▼0.23
Labour hold				
Labour hold				
Labour hold				

=== Northcote ===
Northcote (3)
Party	Candidate	Votes	%	±%
Labour	Tara Dyal*	2,715	85.23	▼6.59
Labour	Chanan Lachar*	2,647		
Labour	Ram Perdesi*	2,602		
Conservative	Mukhtar Hussain	483	14.77	▲6.59
Conservative	Fida Hussain	475		
Conservative	Sebastian Nehru	423		
Registered electors		7,545		▼353
Turnout		3,404	45.12	▲1.03
Rejected ballots		29	0.85	▲0.25
Labour hold				
Labour hold				
Labour hold				

=== Northfield ===
Northfield (3)
Party	Candidate	Votes	%	±%
Labour	Joseph O'Neill	2,175	42.32	▲5.21
Labour	Kieron Gavan	2,163		
Labour	Simon Woodroofe	2,068		
Conservative	Graham Bull*	2,028	38.73	▼4.35
Conservative	Wiktor Lewanski*	1,942		
Conservative	David Millican* (Note: Millican replaced Cllr Robert Hetherington after his death in 1990)	1,892		
Liberal Democrats	Frances Hurst	700	12.51	▲0.90
Liberal Democrats	John James	657		
Liberal Democrats	Michael Lourie	536		
Green	Donald Stephenson	325	6.44	▼5.17
Registered electors		9,049		▼600
Turnout		5,124	56.63	▲2.14
Rejected ballots		8	0.16	▼0.03
Labour gain from Conservative				
Labour gain from Conservative				
Labour gain from Conservative				

=== Perivale ===
Perivale (2)
Party	Candidate	Votes	%	±%
Labour	Christopher Payne	1,234	46.16	▲8.47
Conservative	Bernadette Devine	1,164	42.82	▼9.90
Labour	Ranjit Dheer	1,143		
Conservative	Jerzy Kozlowski	1,041		
Liberal Democrats	Anthony Miller	287	11.02	▲1.43
Liberal Democrats	Penelope Maclachlan	281		
Registered electors		5,422		▼3,854
Turnout		2,813	51.88	▼1.13
Rejected ballots		6	0.21	▲0.07
Labour gain from Conservative				
Conservative hold				
Conservative loss (seat eliminated)				

=== Pitshanger ===
Pitshanger (3)
Party	Candidate	Votes	%	±%
Conservative	Anthony Young*	2,783	55.95	▼11.53
Conservative	Diana Pagan*	2,628		
Conservative	Audrey Hider	2,558		
Labour	Anthony Oliver	1,114	22.79	▲1.38
Labour	Julian Bell	1,071		
Labour	Leonora Lloyd	1,061		
Liberal Democrats	Anne Wilson	736	14.81	▲3.70
Liberal Democrats	Brian Harris	716		
Liberal Democrats	Francesco Fruzza	658		
Green	Anthony Agius	306	6.45	New
Registered electors		9,093		▼339
Turnout		4,780	52.57	▼1.54
Rejected ballots		2	0.04	▼0.25
Conservative hold				
Conservative hold				
Conservative hold				

=== Ravenor ===
Ravenor (3)
Party	Candidate	Votes	%	±%
Labour	Diane Murray	2,104	47.53	▲6.64
Labour	Graham Nickson	1,958		
Labour	Richard Porter	1,859		
Conservative	Dinah Evans	1,806	42.84	▼6.07
Conservative	Adrian Knowles	1,798		
Conservative	Vladimir Kopecky*	1,733		
Liberal Democrats	Madeline Jay	458	9.63	▼0.57
Liberal Democrats	Myer Salaman	342		
Registered electors		8,289		▼657
Turnout		4,544	54.82	▲2.23
Rejected ballots		15	0.36	▲0.06
Labour gain from Conservative				
Labour gain from Conservative				
Labour gain from Conservative				

=== Southfield ===
Southfield (3)
Party	Candidate	Votes	%	±%
Liberal Democrats	Andrew Mitchell	1,409	36.39	▲12.50
Liberal Democrats	Angus Huck	1,387		
Liberal Democrats	Harvey Rose	1,386		
Labour	Colin Bastin	1,220	30.15	▲2.45
Conservative	Timothy Atkinson*	1,211	30.93	▼5.14
Conservative	Martha Ebenezer*	1,175		
Conservative	Philip Richardson*	1,170		
Labour	Tony Gray	1,131		
Labour	Francis Reedy	1,113		
Green	Sebastian Diamond	112	2.53	▼8.98
Green	Christina Meikeljohn	92		
Green	Margaret Dobson	86		
Registered electors		7,674		▼464
Turnout		4,016	52.33	▼1.36
Rejected ballots		17	0.42	▲0.31
Liberal Democrats gain from Conservative				
Liberal Democrats gain from Conservative				
Liberal Democrats gain from Conservative				

=== Springfield ===
Springfield (3)
Party	Candidate	Votes	%	±%
Labour	Andrew Bond*	2,112	51.42	▲11.92
Labour	John Gallagher*	1,990		
Labour	John Delaney	1,985		
Conservative	Sheila Brown	1,608	38.62	▼0.92
Conservative	Michael Chevallier	1,542		
Conservative	Derath Nicklas-Carter	1,423		
Liberal Democrats	Fiona Grabowski	422	9.96	▲1.35
Liberal Democrats	Eric Michael	398		
Liberal Democrats	Simon Rowley	359		
Registered electors		8,180		▼708
Turnout		4,127	50.45	▲2.43
Rejected ballots		3	0.07	▼0.05
Labour hold				
Labour gain from Conservative				
Labour hold				

=== Vale ===
Vale (2)
Party	Candidate	Votes	%	±%
Labour	Patricia Seers*	1,101	51.54	▲3.98
Labour	Roderick Baptie	1,045		
Conservative	Lucy Woodall	809	38.52	▼2.83
Conservative	Christine Magnowska	795		
Liberal Democrats	Donald O'Connell	212	9.94	▼1.15
Liberal Democrats	Mary Slater	201		
Registered electors		4,756		▲468
Turnout		2,283	48.00	▲2.02
Rejected ballots		12	0.53	▲0.20
Labour hold				
Labour hold				

=== Victoria ===
Victoria (2)
Party	Candidate	Votes	%	±%
Labour	Philip Portwood*	1,204	54.16	▲3.09
Labour	Keith Fraser* (Note: Fraser replaced Cllr Anthony John after their resignation in 1992)	1,153		
Conservative	Janet Young	826	36.66	▲12.27
Conservative	Norma Haythorn	770		
Liberal Democrats	Leslie Rowe	210	9.19	New
Liberal Democrats	Muriel Eldridge	189		
Registered electors		5,202		▲28
Turnout		2,344	45.06	▼3.28
Rejected ballots		3	0.13	▼0.55
Labour hold				
Labour hold				

=== Walpole ===
Walpole (3)
Party	Candidate	Votes	%	±%
Labour	Hilary Benn*	2,398	45.70	▼0.81
Labour	Alan Chorley*	2,233		
Labour	Navjot Sidhu	1,937		
Conservative	Eileen Harris	1,711	35.62	▼6.87
Conservative	Joan Porter	1,705		
Conservative	Stephen Jones	1,702		
Liberal Democrats	John Maycock	673	13.95	▲2.95
Liberal Democrats	Oliver Murphy	663		
Independent	Andrew Thomas	227	4.74	New
Registered electors		9,107		▼612
Turnout		4,879	53.57	▲0.19
Rejected ballots		6	0.12	▼0.07
Labour hold				
Labour hold				
Labour gain from Conservative				

=== Waxlow ===
Waxlow (3)
Party	Candidate	Votes	%	±%
Labour	Julia Clements-Elliot*	2,249	63.32	▲8.01
Labour	Harbans Anand	2,098		
Labour	Gurcharan Singh*	2,021		
Conservative	Adrian Dyson	1,338	36.68	▼8.01
Conservative	Anthony Nolder	1,223		
Conservative	Michael Park	1,130		
Registered electors		8,476		▼445
Turnout		3,912	46.15	▲0.06
Rejected ballots		13	0.33	▼0.59
Labour hold				
Labour hold				
Labour hold				

=== West End ===
West End (3)
Party	Candidate	Votes	%	±%
Labour	Ernest Dunckley*	1,892	55.30	▲10.52
Labour	David Bond	1,837		
Labour	Frank Impey	1,713		
Conservative	David Varney*	1,146	33.84	▼11.04
Conservative	James Heydinrych*	1,141		
Conservative	Zena Landeryou	1,043		
Liberal Democrats	Stephen Bown	421	10.85	▲0.51
Liberal Democrats	John Ducker	367		
Liberal Democrats	Jane Mazouz	279		
Registered electors		8,640		▼407
Turnout		4,035	46.70	▲0.84
Rejected ballots		6	0.15	▲0.03
Labour hold				
Labour gain from Conservative				
Labour gain from Conservative				

=== Wood End ===
Wood End (3)
Party	Candidate	Votes	%	±%
Conservative	Brenda Hall	1,723	40.88	▼3.76
Conservative	Stewart Jackson	1,689		
Conservative	Diane Varney	1,636		
Labour	Patricia Colling	1,591	37.77	▲12.05
Labour	Robin Taylor	1,588		
Labour	Gopaldas Gandhi	1,487		
Liberal Democrats	Lyn Woodcock	519	10.66	▼18.98
Liberal Democrats	Nigel Bliss	444		
Independent	Eamonn Kilduff	440	10.69	New
Liberal Democrats	Gary Purkiss	354		
Registered electors		7,771		▼665
Turnout		4,152	53.43	▲0.99
Rejected ballots		7	0.17	▲0.06
Conservative hold				
Conservative hold				
Conservative hold				
