= Greenford Green (ward) =

Electoral ward in London, England

- Former electoral ward for the Ealing London Borough Council
- Borough: Ealing
- County: Greater London
- Major settlements: Greenford

Former electoral ward
- Created: 2002
- Abolished: 2022
- Councillors: 3

Greenford Green was an electoral ward in the London Borough of Ealing. The ward was first used in the 2002 elections and elected three councillors to Ealing London Borough Council until it was abolished in 2022.

== Geography ==
The ward was named after the town of Greenford Green.

== Councillors ==
Election	Councillors		
2018	Anthony Kelly (Labour)	Aysha Raza (Labour)	Simon Woodroofe (Labour)

== Elections ==
=== 2018 ===
Greenford Green (3)
Party	Candidate	Votes	%	±%
Labour	Anthony John Kelly	2,411	58.2	+3.6
Labour	Aysha Sultana Raza	2,191	52.9	+3.6
Labour	Simon Robert Woodroofe	2,114	51.0	+5.1
Conservative	Fred Burley	1,151	27.8	−7.7
Conservative	Olly Rogers	941	22.7	−9.7
Conservative	Mariusz Wozniak	911	22.0	−9.7
Duma Polska	Alicja Glowacka	347	8.4	N/A
Green	Kay Fitzherbert	333	8.0	−2.1
Duma Polska	Marcin Kaczor	313	7.6	N/A
Duma Polska	Sebastian Tomasz Przetakowski	312	7.5	N/A
Liberal Democrats	John Bernard Maycock	253	6.1	−0.8
Liberal Democrats	John Francis Christopher Ducker	212	5.1	−0.7
Liberal Democrats	Gillian Lesley Rowley	158	3.8	−1.9
UKIP	Nicholas Ronald Markwell	138	3.3	N/A
Turnout		4,142	38.77	
Labour hold		Swing		
Labour hold		Swing		
Labour hold		Swing		

== See also ==
- List of electoral wards in Greater London
