= Islip =

Islip may refer to:

== Places ==
=== England ===
- Islip, Northamptonshire
- Islip, Oxfordshire
- Islip Manor Meadows

=== United States ===
- Islip, New York, a town in Suffolk County
  - Islip (hamlet), New York, located in the above town
  - Central Islip, New York, a hamlet and census-designated place located in the above town
  - East Islip, New York, a hamlet and census-designated place located in the above town
  - Islip Terrace, New York, a hamlet and census-designated place located in the above town
  - West Islip, New York, a hamlet and census-designated place located in the above town
  - Long Island MacArthur Airport, formerly known as Islip Airport, in the above town
- Mount Islip, a mountain in California

== Other uses ==
- Islip (surname)
- Islip railway station, Oxfordshire
