= Northolt Mandeville =

Electoral ward in London, England

- Electoral ward for the Ealing London Borough Council
- Northolt Mandeville ward boundaries since 2022
- Borough: Ealing
- County: Greater London
- Population: 17,532 (Note: 2021 census data, reported for 2022 ward boundaries)
- Electorate: 11,585 (Note: As of the 2026 local election)
- Major settlements: Northolt
- Area: 2.920 square kilometres (1.127 sq mi)

Current electoral ward
- Created: 1965 (as Mandeville)
- Councillors: Andrew Bailey; Miriam Rice; Dominic Moffit
- GSS code: E05013531

Northolt Mandeville (known as Mandeville until 2002) is an electoral ward in the London Borough of Ealing. It elects three councillors to Ealing London Borough Council.

== Ward profile ==
The ward covers most of the northern half of Northolt, including the historic village centre, which contains the 13th-century St Mary the Virgin church and the 14th-century Northolt Manor archaeological site. It is primarily residential in character, including both interwar housing developments and the postwar Racecourse Estate, but also contains Northolt Industrial Estate as well as several local parks. Islip Manor Meadows nature reserve is located in the southwest of the ward.

It is named for Mandeville Road, which runs from northeast to southwest through the centre of the ward.

== Councillors ==
Election	Councillors		
1974	Mrs J. M. Clements (Labour)	Walter Ward (Labour)	Leonard Turner (Labour)
1978	Kenneth Acock (Labour)	Walter Ward (Labour)	Leonard Turner (Labour)
1982	Kenneth Acock (Labour)	Walter Ward (Labour)	Leonard Turner (Labour)
1986	Kenneth Acock (Labour)	Walter Ward (Labour)	Leonard Turner (Labour)
1990	Peter Downham (Conservative)	Charles Richards (Conservative)	Joan Trinder (Conservative)
1994	Raymond Chudley (Labour)	Neal Underwood (Note: Underwood was originally elected as a councillor representing the Labour Party, but later defected and ran for re-election representing the Green Party.) (Labour)	Vanessa Lemin (Labour)
1998	Neill Richardson (Labour)	Brian Reeves (Labour)	Peter Downham (Conservative)
1999 by-election	Neill Richardson (Labour)	Glenn Murphy (Conservative)	Peter Downham (Conservative)
2002	Hazel Ware (Conservative)	Glenn Murphy (Conservative)	Peter Downham (Conservative)
2005 by-election	Hazel Ware (Conservative)	Glenn Murphy (Conservative)	Eileen Harris (Conservative)
2006	Hazel Ware (Conservative)	Dawn Larmouth (Conservative)	Eileen Harris (Conservative)
2010	Chris Summers (Labour)	Ara Iskanderian (Labour)	Eileen Harris (Conservative)
2014	Chris Summers (Labour)	Steve Hynes (Labour)	Natasha Ahmed-Shaikh (Labour)
2018	Chris Summers (Labour)	Miriam Rice (Labour)	Deirdre Costigan (Labour Co-op)
2022	Chris Summers (Labour)	Miriam Rice (Labour)	Deirdre Costigan (Labour Co-op)
2024 by-election	Chris Summers (Labour)	Miriam Rice (Labour)	Dominic Moffit (Labour)
2026	Andrew Bailey (Labour)	Miriam Rice (Labour)	Dominic Moffit (Labour)

== Election results ==
=== Elections in the 2020s ===
2026 Ealing London Borough Council election: Northolt Mandeville (3 seats)
Party	Candidate	Votes	%	±%
Labour	Andrew Bailey	1,779	41.2	−20.0
Labour	Miriam Rice	1,452	33.6	−22.8
Labour	Dominic Moffit	1,387	32.1	−23.0
Green	Katy Barton	931	21.6	+8.5
Reform	Donal de Blacam	915	21.2	N/A
Reform	Conrad Lewandowski	869	20.1	N/A
Reform	Marco Manassero	818	18.9	N/A
Green	Beth McCormack	812	18.8	+5.7
Conservative	James Bremen	723	16.7	−12.8
Conservative	Andrew Maddox	671	15.5	−8.1
Conservative	Elliott Malik	584	13.5	−10.0
Liberal Democrats	Lawrence Aggleton	429	9.9	+2.5
Liberal Democrats	Leslie Hurst	388	9.0	+2.2
Liberal Democrats	Jim McWilliams	321	7.4	+2.2
Registered electors		11,585		
Turnout		4,319	37.28	+0.22
Labour hold		Swing		
Labour hold		Swing		
Labour hold		Swing		

2024 Northolt Mandeville by-election, 10 October 2024
Party	Candidate	Votes	%	±%
Labour	Dominic Moffit	1,126	44.7	−10.3
Conservative	Andrew Bailey	730	29.0	+2.5
Reform	Conrad Lewandowski	271	10.8	New
Green	Natalia Kubica	199	7.9	−3.9
Liberal Democrats	Pedro Da Conceicao	114	4.5	−2.2
Workers Party	Eltayeb Omima	86	3.2	New
Turnout		2,532	21.41	−15.65
Labour hold		Swing		

The by-election was called following the resignation of Cllr Deirdre Costigan, who had been elected MP for Ealing Southall at the 2024 general election. It was held on the same day as by-elections in Hanger Hill and South Acton wards.

2022 Ealing London Borough Council election: Northolt Mandeville (3)
Party	Candidate	Votes	%	±%
Labour Co-op	Deirdre Costigan	2,566	61.2	N/A
Labour Co-op	Miriam Rice	2,364	56.4	N/A
Labour Co-op	Chris Summers	2,309	55.1	N/A
Conservative	Justin Anderson	1,236	29.5	N/A
Conservative	Diva Nazari	990	23.6	N/A
Conservative	Ali Ahmed	984	23.5	N/A
Green	Katy Barton	551	13.1	N/A
Liberal Democrats	Matthew Hirst	312	7.4	N/A
Liberal Democrats	Lawrence Aggleton	287	6.8	N/A
Liberal Democrats	Pat Mellor	220	5.2	N/A
Turnout		4,194	37.06	
Labour win (new boundaries)				
Labour win (new boundaries)				
Labour win (new boundaries)				

=== Elections in the 2010s ===
2018 Ealing London Borough Council election: Northolt Mandeville (3)
Party	Candidate	Votes	%	±%
Labour Co-op	Deirdre Costigan	2,509	62.3	+10.6
Labour Co-op	Chris Summers	2,399	59.6	+7.0
Labour Co-op	Miriam Rice	2,317	57.6	+6.2
Conservative	Inderjit Anand	981	24.4	−1.9
Conservative	Paramjit Anand	974	24.2	−1.5
Conservative	John Ross	889	22.1	−1.5
Green	Katy Barton	420	10.4	N/A
Liberal Democrats	Loreta Alac	295	7.3	+2.2
UKIP	Peter McIlvenna	209	5.2	+11.5
Liberal Democrats	Lee Horwich	190	4.7	+0.5
Liberal Democrats	Luke Nash	178	4.4	+0.3
Turnout		4,026	36.50	
Labour hold		Swing		
Labour hold		Swing		
Labour hold		Swing		

2014 Ealing London Borough Council election: Northolt Mandeville (3)
Party	Candidate	Votes	%	±%
Labour	Chris Summers	2,313	52.6	+10.9
Labour	Natasha Ahmed-Shaikh	2,277	51.7	+12.3
Labour	Steve Hynes	2,261	51.4	+13.8
Conservative	Eileen Harris	1,158	26.3	−11.5
Conservative	Paramjit Singh Anand	1,132	25.7	−12.0
Conservative	Diana Salisbury	1,039	23.6	−12.8
UKIP	Bryan Parry	734	16.7	N/A
BNP	David Smith	234	5.3	+0.2
Liberal Democrats	Muhammad Kadhum	223	5.1	−7.3
Liberal Democrats	Gillian Rowley	183	4.2	−7.9
Liberal Democrats	Alan Miller	180	4.1	−10.5
Turnout		4401	41.46	
Labour hold		Swing		
Labour hold		Swing		
Labour gain from Conservative		Swing		

2010 Ealing London Borough Council election: Northolt Mandeville (3)
Party	Candidate	Votes	%	±%
Labour	Chris Summers	2,448	41.7	
Labour	Ara Iskanderian	2,310	39.4	
Conservative	Eileen Harris	2,218	37.8	
Conservative	Hazel Ware	2,212	37.7	
Labour	Natasha Shaikh	2,204	37.6	
Conservative	John Salisbury	2,134	36.4	
Liberal Democrats	Alan Miller	858	14.6	
Liberal Democrats	John Seymour	726	12.4	
Liberal Democrats	Myer Salaman	711	12.1	
BNP	Paul Winnett	299	5.1	
Turnout		5867	58.81	
Rejected ballots		33		
Labour gain from Conservative		Swing		
Labour gain from Conservative		Swing		
Conservative hold		Swing		

The election took place on the same day as the 2010 general election.

=== Elections in the 2000s ===
2006 Ealing London Borough Council election: Northolt Mandeville (3)
Party	Candidate	Votes	%	±%
Conservative	Hazel Ware	1,724	51.0	
Conservative	Eileen Harris	1,713		
Conservative	Dawn Larmouth	1,597		
Labour	Walter Bernard	1,184	35.0	
Labour	Timothy Murtagh	1,117		
Labour	Surinder Varma	1,066		
Liberal Democrats	Alan Miller	472	14.0	
Liberal Democrats	John Seymour	409		
Liberal Democrats	Myer Salaman	398		
Turnout			36.5	
Conservative hold		Swing		
Conservative hold		Swing		
Conservative hold		Swing		

Northolt Mandeville by-election, 30 June 2005
Party	Candidate	Votes	%	±%
Conservative	Eileen Harris	1,017	42.1	−7.4
Labour	Timothy Murtagh	848	35.1	−6.8
Lib Dem Focus Team	Anthony Miller	497	20.6	+12.0
Green	Brian Outten	52	2.2	+2.2
Majority		169	7.0	
Turnout		2,414	25.0	
Conservative hold		Swing		

The by-election was called following the death of Cllr Peter Downham.

2002 Ealing London Borough Council election: Northolt Mandeville (3)
Party	Candidate	Votes	%	±%
Conservative	Peter Downham	1,476	50.3	
Conservative	Glenn Murphy	1,455		
Conservative	Hazel Ware	1,444		
Labour	Allan Brown	1,250	41.2	
Labour	Susan McLeod	1,175		
Labour	Bassam Mahfouz	1,162		
Liberal Democrats	John Seymour	258	8.5	
Liberal Democrats	Dietlinde Hatherall	249		
Liberal Democrats	Myer Salaman	230		
Turnout			33.48	
Conservative win (new boundaries)				
Conservative win (new boundaries)				
Conservative win (new boundaries)				

=== Elections in the 1990s ===
Mandeville by-election, 30 September 1999
Party	Candidate	Votes	%	±%
Conservative	Glenn Murphy	964	54.8	+19.1
Labour	Paul Woodgate	685	38.9	−1.8
Liberal Democrats	Francesco Fruzza	110	6.6	+0.6
Majority		279	15.9	
Turnout		1,759	22.5	
Conservative gain from Labour		Swing		

The by-election was called following the resignation of Cllr Brian Reeves.

1998 Ealing London Borough Council election: Mandeville (3)
Party	Candidate	Votes	%	±%
Labour	Brian Reeves	1,159	41.37	
Labour	Neill Richardson	1,052		
Conservative	Peter Downham	1,017	38.24	
Conservative	Joan Trinder	991		
Labour	Robert Khan	961		
Conservative	Allan Ilsley	924		
Green	Neal Underwood	507	14.69	
Green	Steven Brown	330		
Green	Meike Lawrence	289		
Liberal Democrats	Dietlinde Hatherall	162	5.69	
Liberal Democrats	Myer Salaman	129		
Registered electors		7,848		
Turnout		2,762	35.19	
Rejected ballots		16	0.58	
Labour hold		Swing		
Labour hold		Swing		
Conservative gain from Labour		Swing		

1994 Ealing London Borough Council election: Mandeville (3)
Party	Candidate	Votes	%	±%
Labour	Raymond Chudley	2,031	53.53	
Labour	Neal Underwood	2,012		
Labour	Vanessa Lemin	2,004		
Conservative	Peter Downham	1,758	46.47	
Conservative	Charles Richards	1,751		
Conservative	Joan Trinder	1,740		
Registered electors		7,850		
Turnout		4,089	52.09	
Rejected ballots		25	0.61	
Labour gain from Conservative		Swing		
Labour gain from Conservative		Swing		
Labour gain from Conservative		Swing		

1990 Ealing London Borough Council election: Mandeville (3)
Party	Candidate	Votes	%	±%
Conservative	Peter Downham	2,210	53.80	
Conservative	Charles Richards	2,167		
Conservative	Joan Trinder	2,159		
Labour	Kenneth Acock	1,647	37.68	
Labour	Malcolm Ede	1,493		
Labour	Anthony Oliver	1,438		
Liberal Democrats	Alan Miller	374	8.52	
Liberal Democrats	Cynthia Miller	362		
Liberal Democrats	Myer Salaman	300		
Registered electors		8,379		
Turnout		4,294	51.25	
Rejected ballots		4	0.09	
Conservative gain from Labour		Swing		
Conservative gain from Labour		Swing		
Conservative gain from Labour		Swing		

=== Elections in the 1980s ===
1986 Ealing London Borough Council election: Mandeville (3)
Party	Candidate	Votes	%	±%
Labour	Kenneth Acock	2,050	54.7	
Labour	Walter Ward	2,041		
Labour	Leonard Turner	1,961		
Conservative	Jane Emery	1,240	33.1	
Conservative	Nigel Pearce	1,192		
Conservative	Alan Gillett	1,171		
Alliance	Peter Downham	460	12.3	
Alliance	Anthony Steel	459		
Alliance	David Lester	441		
Registered electors		8,618		
Turnout			45.4	
Labour hold		Swing		
Labour hold		Swing		
Labour hold		Swing		

1982 Ealing London Borough Council election: Mandeville (3)
Party	Candidate	Votes	%	±%
Labour Co-op	Kenneth Acock	1,815	45.6	
Labour Co-op	Walter Ward	1,718		
Labour	Leonard Turner	1,688		
Conservative	Peter Clark	1,442	36.2	
Conservative	Colmar Lewis	1,337		
Conservative	Christopher Radmore	1,303		
Alliance	Peter Ashby	726	16.2	
Alliance	Christopher Johnson	691		
Alliance	Glennis Harrison	658		
Registered electors		8,444		
Turnout			48.4	
Labour hold		Swing		
Labour hold		Swing		
Labour hold		Swing		

=== Elections in the 1970s ===
1978 Ealing London Borough Council election: Mandeville (3)
Party	Candidate	Votes	%	±%
Labour	Kenneth Acock	2,202	52.2	
Labour	Walter Ward	2,077		
Labour	Leonard Turner	1,984		
Conservative	Nigel Brooks	1,761	41.7	
Conservative	Colmar Lewis	1,718		
Conservative	Alan Skelton	1,718		
Liberal	David Cox	255	6.0	
Liberal	Ronald Thornton	233		
Liberal	Leonard Lambkin	228		
Registered electors		8,468		
Turnout			52.5	
Labour hold		Swing		
Labour hold		Swing		
Labour hold		Swing		

1974 Ealing London Borough Council election: Mandeville (3)
Party	Candidate	Votes	%	±%
Labour	W. R. Ward	2,205	57.5	
Labour	Mrs J. M. Clements	2,187		
Labour	L. J. Turner	2,168		
Conservative	M. W. Smith	1,243	32.4	
Conservative	P. J. Sturley	1,238		
Conservative	P. D. M. Southgate	1,217		
Liberal	Miss J. E. Hulford	300	7.8	
Liberal	L. G. Lambkin	300		
Liberal	D. F. Lester	289		
Communist	D. F. Bond	90	2.3	
Registered electors		8,933		
Turnout			43.8	
Labour hold		Swing		
Labour hold		Swing		
Labour hold		Swing		

Mandeville by-election, 27 April 1972
Party	Candidate	Votes	%	±%
Labour	T. F. Durkin	2,088	59.4	
Conservative	D. J. Hart	1,428	40.6	
Registered electors		9,064		
Turnout			38.8	
Labour hold		Swing		

1971 Ealing London Borough Council election: Mandeville (3)
Party	Candidate	Votes	%	±%
Labour	W. R. Ward	2,806	63.9	
Labour	D. C. Thompson	2,805		
Labour	D. R. A. Miller	2,801		
Conservative	C. A. Prince	1,587	36.1	
Conservative	J. G. Crawford	1,575		
Conservative	D. J. Hart	1,566		
Registered electors		9,085		
Turnout			49.6	
Labour gain from Conservative		Swing		
Labour gain from Conservative		Swing		
Labour gain from Conservative		Swing		

=== Elections in the 1960s ===
1968 Ealing London Borough Council election: Mandeville (3)
Party	Candidate	Votes	%	±%
Conservative	F. W. Blows	2,399		
Conservative	B. R. Chapman	2,370		
Conservative	G. F. Taylor	2,370		
Labour	F. J. F. Little	1,672		
Labour	E. C. Noyes	1,663		
Labour	Mrs N. R. Law	1,647		
Communist	M. J. Nicks	249		
Registered electors		9,281		
Turnout			45.7	
Conservative gain from Labour		Swing		
Conservative gain from Labour		Swing		
Conservative gain from Labour		Swing		
