= Hanger Hill (ward) =

- Electoral ward for the Ealing London Borough Council
- Hanger Hill ward boundaries since 2022
- Borough: Ealing
- County: Greater London
- Population: 17,044 (Note: 2021 Census data reported for 2022 ward boundaries)
- Electorate: 10,924 (2022)
- Area: 3.416 square kilometres (1.319 sq mi)

Current electoral ward
- Created: 1965
- Number of members: 3
- Councillors: Athena Zissimos; Fabio Conti; Jonathan Oxley
- GSS code: E05013524

Hanger Hill is an electoral ward in the London Borough of Ealing. The ward was first used in the 1964 elections. It returns three councillors to Ealing London Borough Council.

== Ealing council elections since 2022 ==
There was a revision of ward boundaries in Ealing in 2022.

=== 2024 by-election ===
The by-election took place on 10 October 2024, following the resignation of Gregory Stafford. It was held on the same day as by-elections in Northolt Mandeville and South Acton.

2024 Hanger Hill by-election
Party	Candidate	Votes	%	±%
Liberal Democrats	Jonathan Oxley	1,655	52.3	+19.4
Conservative	Sean Hanrahan	814	25.7	−5.3
Labour	Guneet Singh Malik	315	10.0	−13.2
Green	Kate Crossland	245	7.7	−5.1
Reform UK	Fabio Pukaj	98	3.1	New
Workers Party	Wagdi Thabit	35	1.1	New
Turnout				
Liberal Democrats gain from Conservative		Swing		

=== 2022 election ===
The election took place on 5 May 2022.

2022 Ealing London Borough Council election: Hanger Hill
Party	Candidate	Votes	%	±%
Liberal Democrats	Athena Zissimos	1,657	36.2	N/A
Conservative	Fabio Conti	1,559	34.0	N/A
Conservative	Gregory Stafford	1,549	33.8	N/A
Conservative	Nigel Sumner	1,479	32.3	N/A
Liberal Democrats	Mark Sanders	1,456	31.8	N/A
Liberal Democrats	Jonathan Oxley	1,437	31.4	N/A
Labour	Joan Russell	1,166	25.4	N/A
Labour	Avesta Afshari-Mehr	1,154	25.2	N/A
Labour	Oliver Lozada	1,094	23.9	N/A
Green	Michal Solski	645	14.1	N/A
Turnout		4,582	41.94	
Liberal Democrats win (new boundaries)				
Conservative win (new boundaries)				
Conservative win (new boundaries)				
