= Dormers Wells =

Coordinates: 51.516°N 0.364°W

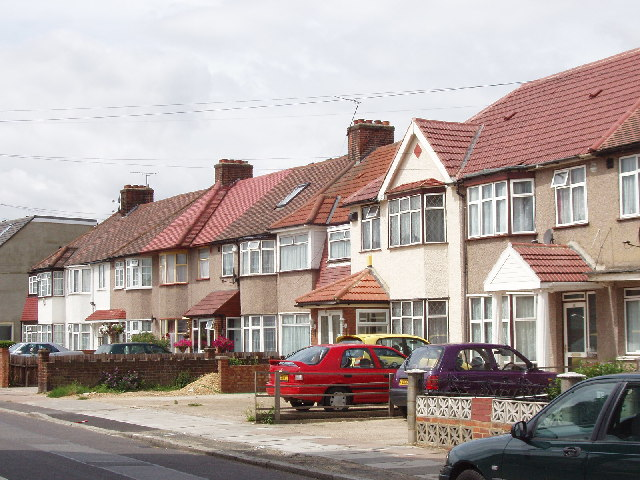
- Houses in Allenby Road, Dormer's Wells

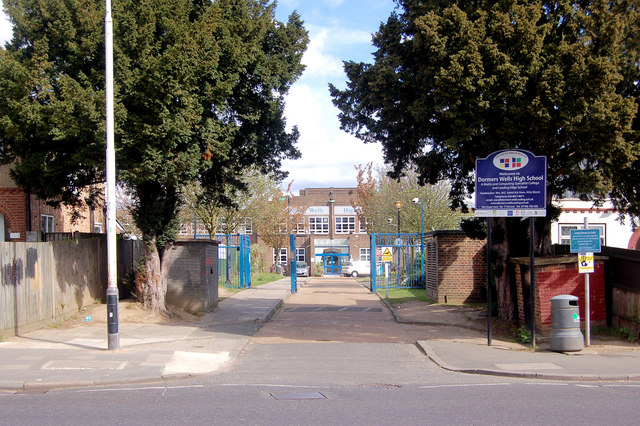
- Dormers Wells High School

- Location within Greater London
- Population: 13,910 (2011 Census.Ward)
- OS grid reference: TQ 136 809
- London borough: Ealing
- Ceremonial county: Greater London
- Region: London
- Country: England
- Sovereign state: United Kingdom
- Post town: SOUTHALL
- Postcode district: UB1
- Dialling code: 020
- Police: Metropolitan
- Fire: London
- Ambulance: London
- UK Parliament: Ealing Southall
- London Assembly: Ealing and Hillingdon

Dormers Wells or Dormer's Wells is an urban community or neighbourhood in west London, England consisting of a grid of mostly semi-detached or terraced houses with gardens and small parks: in the London Borough of Ealing, and the Southall post town area.

== History ==
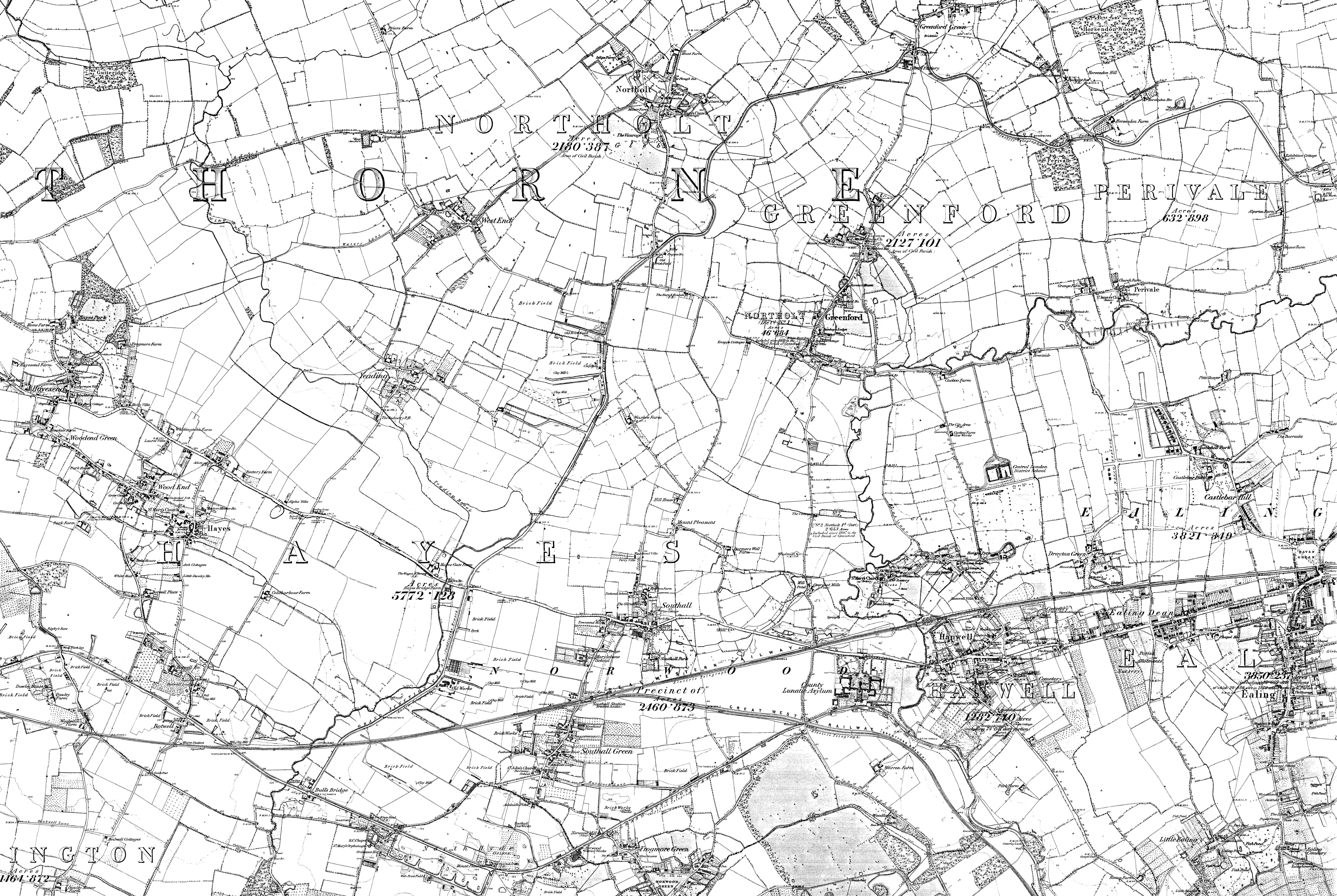
Extract from Map, Ordnance Survey, 1868-1883. Fields surrounding Mount Pleasant (house) and Dormer's Well Farmhouse form the modern area.

Until urban/suburban development in the mid 20th century this area formed a small, east part of the precinct of Norwood—a relatively rare half subdivision of the large parish of Hayes—Hayes measured 5,772 acres (23.4 km^{2}) 9 mi^{2} (3 miles by 3 miles). Southall and Norwood manors in much of the medieval period belonged to the Archbishop of Canterbury hence giving the Norwood quasi-chapelry — virtually all a mixed agricultural area which covered today's Dormer's Wells, Norwood Green and Southall — the higher, less alienable status of a precinct. The 12th century founded, much-altered chapel is St Mary's Church, Norwood Green.

St John's Church, Southall was built and endowed in 1838; consecrated in three years and made a parish in 1850. Nine years later Norwood precinct was created a parish separate from that of Hayes. Further Anglican churches followed: Holy Trinity, St George, Christ the Redeemer and Emmanuel none are named after this area.

In 1800 the precinct's overshot flour mill on the edge of the fields associated with "Dorman's Well Farm" belonged to the Hayes manorial estate, the main manor in the parish. At that date it stood, together with a house and other property, at Dorman's Well. The overshot mill, comprising a mill, house, millpond, and land, was owned by the Earl of Jersey in 1821 (Villiers family seated at nearby Osterley Park) and in the 1860s stood, as before, on Windmill Lane at Dorman's Well.

It is possible that the Dorman's Well estate (an earlier recorded form of Dormer's Well farm) formed the demesne (Lord of the Manor's own grounds) of Southall manor in the late 16th century.

In the late 20th century migration into the area included part of London's Sikh community, who established a large community building and venue for public hire, the Baba Wadbhag Singh Trust building.

== Amenities ==
The area has a large secondary school, Dormers Wells High School which has widened the area's informal scope as it has no traditional clear definition but is commonly a feature of local government ward names; a primary school, a playcentre, nursery, a community centre and an old people's home.

== Subsumed estates ==
Almost uniform housing plots and buildings, mainly semi-detached built in the 1930s to 1970s, has taken over former farms and large demolished houses. From these three of Dormer's Wells' residential estates take their first-advertised and official name, which remain used by some residents: Mount Pleasant, Telford and Allenby. Mount Pleasant as an isolated cluster of houses on a road junction similar to Dormer's Well Farm features in official 19th century maps of the area.

== Politics and government ==
Dormers Wells is part of the Dormers Wells ward for elections to the Ealing London Borough Council.
