= Dormers Wells (ward) =

Electoral ward in London, England

- Electoral ward for the Ealing London Borough Council
- Dormers Wells ward boundaries since 2022
- Borough: Ealing
- County: Greater London
- Population: 15,611 (2021) (Note: 2021 Census data reported for 2022 ward boundaries)
- Major settlements: Dormers Wells
- Area: 2.337 km²

Current electoral ward
- Created: 1965
- Number of members: 3
- Councillors: Ranjit Dheer; Kanwal Bains; Isabel Owen
- GSS code: E05013519 (2022–present)

Dormers Wells is an electoral ward in the London Borough of Ealing. The ward was first used in the 1964 elections and elects three councillors to Ealing London Borough Council.

== Ealing council elections since 2022 ==
=== 2026 election ===
The election took place on 7 May 2026.

=== 2022 election ===
The election took place on 5 May 2022.

2022 Ealing London Borough Council election: Dormers Wells
Party	Candidate	Votes	%	±%
Labour	Kanwal Bains	2,498	64.9	N/A
Labour	Ranjit Dheer	2,367	61.5	N/A
Labour	Mohinder Midha	2,272	59.1	N/A
Conservative	Babul Sharker	630	16.4	N/A
Conservative	Mohammed Hoshen	625	16.2	N/A
Conservative	Salah Uddin	597	15.5	N/A
EIN	Minni Dogra	415	10.8	N/A
Green	Darren Moore	371	9.6	N/A
Liberal Democrats	Bob Browning	338	8.8	N/A
Liberal Democrats	Oliver Murphy	281	7.3	N/A
Liberal Democrats	Francesco Fruzza	262	6.8	N/A
Turnout		3,847	37.27	
Labour win (new boundaries)				
Labour win (new boundaries)				
Labour win (new boundaries)				

== 2002–2022 Ealing council elections ==
=== 2018 by-election ===
The by-election took place on 8 November 2018, following the death of Tej Bagha.

2018 Dormers Wells by-election
Party	Candidate	Votes	%	±%
Labour	Mohinda Midha	1,868	72.1	+2.9
Conservative	Amandeep Gill	429	16.6	+0.8
Liberal Democrats	Nigel Bakhai	188	7.3	+2.7
Green	Meena Hans	106	4.1	−3.2
Majority		1,439	55.5	
Turnout		2,591		
Labour hold		Swing		

=== 2018 election ===
The election took place on 3 May 2018.

2018 Ealing London Borough Council election: Dormers Wells
Party	Candidate	Votes	%	±%
Labour	Tejinder Dhami	2,890	71.7	−2.3
Labour	Tej Bagha	2,842	70.6	−2.6
Labour	Ranjit Dheer	2,751	68.3	−5.1
Conservative	Eileen Harris	662	16.4	+0.7
Conservative	Abdi-Rashiid Hassan	618	15.3	−0.1
Conservative	Eva Shack	572	14.2	+1.7
Green	Nicholas Chapman	304	7.5	N/A
Liberal Democrats	Leslie Glancy	192	4.8	−1.7
Liberal Democrats	Susan Kendrick	136	3.4	−4.3
Duma Polska	Anna Jakubiak	131	3.3	N/A
Liberal Democrats	Lyn Woodcock	110	2.7	−2.2
Duma Polska	Miroslaw Komor	109	2.7	N/A
Duma Polska	Piotr Jakubiak	105	2.6	N/A
Turnout		4,028	39.97	
Labour hold		Swing		
Labour hold		Swing		
Labour hold		Swing		

=== 2014 election ===
The election took place on 22 May 2014.

=== 2010 election ===
The election on 6 May 2010 took place on the same day as the United Kingdom general election.

=== 2006 election ===
The election took place on 4 May 2006.

=== 2002 election ===
The election took place on 2 May 2002.

== 1978–2002 Ealing council elections ==
=== 1998 election ===
The election on 7 May 1998 took place on the same day as the 1998 Greater London Authority referendum.

=== 1994 election ===
The election took place on 5 May 1994.

=== 1991 by-election ===
The by-election took place on 14 November 1991.

=== 1990 election ===
The election took place on 3 May 1990.

=== 1986 election ===
The election took place on 8 May 1986.

=== 1982 election ===
The election took place on 6 May 1982.

=== 1978 election ===
The election took place on 4 May 1978.

== 1964–1978 Ealing council elections ==
=== 1974 election ===
The election took place on 2 May 1974.

=== 1971 election ===
The election took place on 13 May 1971.

=== 1970 by-election ===
The election took place on 19 March 1970.

=== 1968 election ===
The election took place on 9 May 1968.

=== 1964 election ===
The election took place on 7 May 1964.

== See also ==
- List of electoral wards in Greater London
