= Hobbayne (ward) =

Former electoral ward in the London Borough of Ealing

- Former electoral ward for the Ealing London Borough Council
- Hobbayne ward boundaries from 2002 to 2022
- Borough: Ealing
- County: Greater London
- Electorate: 10,354 (2018)
- Major settlements: Hanwell
- Area: 3.416 square kilometres (1.319 sq mi)

Former electoral ward
- Created: 1978
- Abolished: 2022
- Number of members: 3
- Replaced by: North Hanwell, Pitshanger
- GSS code: E05000180

Hobbayne was an electoral ward in the London Borough of Ealing from 1978 to 2022. The ward was first used in the 1978 elections and last used for the 2018 elections, with two by-elections in 2021. It returned three councillors to Ealing London Borough Council.

== 2002–2022 Ealing council elections ==
There was a revision of ward boundaries in Ealing in 2002.

=== September 2021 by-election ===
The by-election took place on 16 September 2021, following the resignation of Lewis Cox.

September 2021 Hobbayne by-election
| Party | Candidate | Votes | % | ±% |
|---|---|---|---|---|
| Labour | Claire Tighe | 1,617 | 52.2 | +1.2 |
| Conservative | David Castle | 865 | 27.9 | +8.1 |
| Green | Alan Anderson | 362 | 11.7 | −0.8 |
| Liberal Democrats | Alastair Mitton | 207 | 6.7 | −0.1 |
| TUSC | Tony Gill | 48 | 1.5 | +1.5 |
| Majority | | 752 | 24.3 | |
| Turnout | | 3,099 | | |
| Labour hold | | Swing | | |

=== May 2021 by-election ===
The by-election took place on 6 May 2021, following the death of Anna Tomlinson.

May 2021 Hobbayne by-election
| Party | Candidate | Votes | % | ±% |
|---|---|---|---|---|
| Labour | Louise Brett | 2,345 | 48.3 | −2.7 |
| Conservative | David Castle | 1,477 | 30.4 | +10.6 |
| Green | Emily Grassi | 609 | 12.5 | −0.6 |
| Liberal Democrats | Alastair Mitton | 366 | 7.5 | +0.7 |
| TUSC | Tony Gill | 56 | 1.2 | +1.2 |
| Majority | | 868 | 17.9 | |
| Turnout | | 4,853 | | |
| Labour hold | | Swing | | |

=== 2018 election ===
The election took place on 3 May 2018.

2018 Ealing London Borough Council election: Hobbayne (3)
| Party | Candidate | Votes | % | ±% |
|---|---|---|---|---|
| Labour | Lewis Cox | 2,595 | 57.6 | −1.3 |
| Labour | Anna Tomlinson | 2,579 | 57.2 | +1.3 |
| Labour | Ray Wall | 2,479 | 55.0 | −2.6 |
| Conservative | Surendra Dhungan | 1,009 | 22.4 | −9.2 |
| Conservative | Patrick Cusworth | 979 | 21.7 | −2.8 |
| Conservative | Roger Grimshaw | 961 | 21.3 | −2.2 |
| Green | Alan Anderson | 669 | 14.8 | ±0.0 |
| Liberal Democrats | Judith Ducker | 344 | 7.6 | +1.2 |
| Liberal Democrats | Francesco Fruzza | 327 | 7.3 | +2.0 |
| Liberal Democrats | Mo Muman | 284 | 6.3 | +2.9 |
| Duma Polska | Dominik Sitarek | 266 | 5.9 | N/A |
| Duma Polska | Chris Wiciak | 254 | 5.6 | N/A |
| Independent | Daniel McGoun | 210 | 4.7 | N/A |
| Turnout | | 4,507 | 43.53 | |
| Labour hold | | Swing | | |
| Labour hold | | Swing | | |
| Labour hold | | Swing | | |
