= Perivale (ward) =

Electoral ward in London, England

- Electoral ward for the Ealing London Borough Council
- Borough: Ealing
- County: Greater London
- Population: 16,185 (2021)
- Major settlements: Perivale
- Area: 3.367 km²

Current electoral ward
- Created: 1965
- Councillors: 3; 2 (1994 to 2002)

Perivale is an electoral ward in the London Borough of Ealing. The ward was first used in the 1964 elections and elects three councillors to Ealing London Borough Council.

== History ==
The ward elected two councillors between 1994 and 2002.

== Geography ==
The ward is named after the town of Perivale.

== Councillors ==
Election	Councillors		
2018	Munir Ahmed (Labour)	Tariq Mahmood (Labour)	Charan Sharma (Labour)
2022	Munir Ahmed (Labour)	Tariq Mahmood (Labour)	Charan Sharma (Labour)

== Elections ==
=== 2022 ===
Perivale (3 seats)
Party	Candidate	Votes	%	±%
Labour	Munir Ahmed	2,505	55.1	N/A
Labour	Tariq Mahmood	2,423	53.3	N/A
Labour	Charan Sharma	2,342	51.5	N/A
Conservative	Andrew Bailey	1,452	31.9	N/A
Conservative	Vlod Barchuk	1,234	27.1	N/A
Conservative	Edmond Yeo	1,232	27.1	N/A
Green	Alex Vines	517	11.4	N/A
Liberal Democrats	Margaret Friday	391	8.6	N/A
Liberal Democrats	Geoffrey Berg	357	7.9	N/A
Liberal Democrats	Tony Miller	288	6.3	N/A
TUSC	Helen Pattison	128	2.8	N/A
Turnout		4,546	41.24	
Labour hold				
Labour hold				
Labour hold				

=== 2018 ===
Perivale (3)
Party	Candidate	Votes	%	±%
Labour	Munir Ahmed	2,921	58.8	+7.3
Labour	Tariq Mahmood	2,763	55.6	+8.2
Labour	Charan Bala Sharma	2,732	55.0	+7.0
Conservative	Anu Khela	1,217	24.5	−5.2
Conservative	James Challinor	1,216	24.5	+3.0
Conservative	Edmond Heng-Kuen Yeo	1,145	23.0	+6.5
Duma Polska	Marta Banovich	381	7.7	N/A
Duma Polska	Caesar Olszewski	381	7.7	N/A
Duma Polska	Tomasz Zukowski	356	7.2	N/A
Green	Sebastian John Diamond	330	6.6	−3.7
Liberal Democrats	Robert Browning	256	5.2	−0.5
Liberal Democrats	Patrick Anthony Hillyer White	242	4.9	−0.2
Liberal Democrats	Pantea Etessami	143	2.9	−1.9
Turnout		4,970	43.75	
Labour hold		Swing		
Labour hold		Swing		
Labour hold		Swing		

== See also ==
- List of electoral wards in Greater London
