= Islip (surname) =

Islip is a surname. Notable people with the surname include:

- Ernie Islip (1892–1941), English footballer
- John Islip (1464–1532), Abbot of Westminster
- Simon Islip (died 1366), Archbishop of Canterbury
