= Islip Manor Meadows =

Nature reserve in Ealing, London

Coordinates: 51.5483°N 0.38759°W

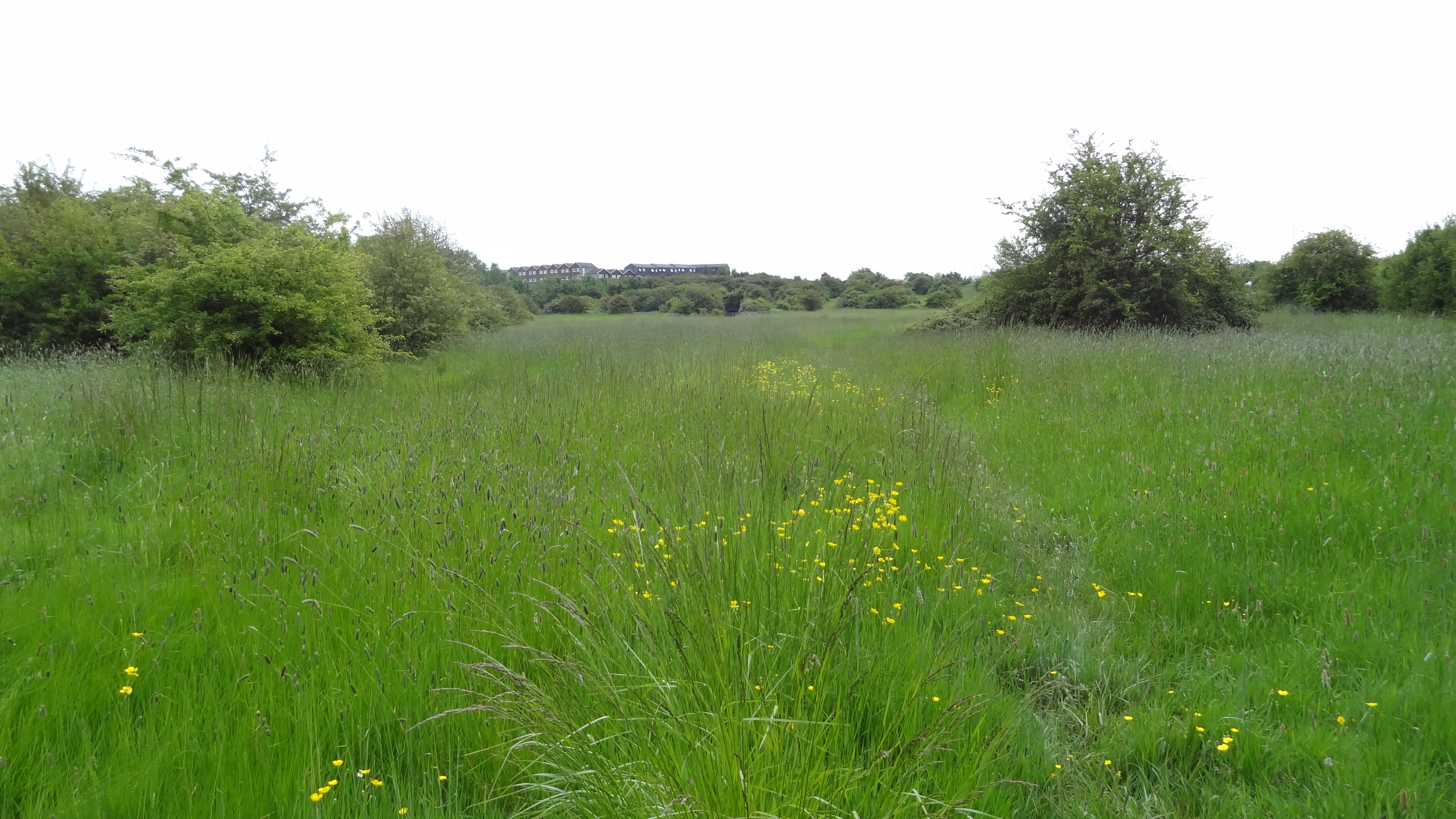

Islip Manor Meadows is a 23.75 hectare Local Nature Reserve and Site of Metropolitan Importance for Nature Conservation in Northolt in the London Borough of Ealing. It is owned and managed by Ealing Council.

Islip Manor was named after the Ruislip family, who owned the estate in the fourteenth and fifteenth centuries. It was part of Northolt Manor until about 1690, when it was sold to Charles Hawtrey. It was farmland until the end of the nineteenth century, and in 1880 it was producing 100 tons of hay a year. In 1928 it was sold to Ealing Council, and now forms part of the Metropolitan Green Belt.

The site is a wet meadow which is divided into fields by thick hedges. The ecology is diverse, with over twenty grass and ten leguminous species. Uncommon plants include ragged-robin, lesser spearwort and oval sedge. The site also has the protected great crested newt.

There is access by a stile at the end of Arnold Road.
