= Walpole (ward) =

Electoral ward in London, England

- Electoral ward for the Ealing London Borough Council
- Borough: Ealing
- County: Greater London
- Population: 14,756 (2021)
- Major settlements: Walpole Park
- Area: 1.593 km²

Current electoral ward
- Created: 1965
- Councillors: 3

Walpole is an electoral ward in the London Borough of Ealing. The ward was first used in the 1964 elections and elects three councillors to Ealing London Borough Council.

== Geography ==
The ward is named after the area of Walpole Park.

== Councillors ==
Election	Councillors		
2018	Binda Rai (Labour)	Paul Conlan (Labour)	Gareth Shaw (Labour)
2022	Binda Rai (Labour)	Grace Quansah (Labour)	Gareth Shaw (Labour)

== Elections ==
=== 2022 ===
Walpole (3 seats)
Party	Candidate	Votes	%	±%
Labour	Binda Rai	2,085	40.7	N/A
Labour	Grace Quansah	2,074	40.5	N/A
Labour	Gareth Shaw	2,024	39.5	N/A
Conservative	John Cowing	1,415	27.6	N/A
Conservative	Isobel Grant	1,414	27.6	N/A
Conservative	Monika Williams	1,263	24.7	N/A
Liberal Democrats	Mark Andrews	1,018	19.9	N/A
Liberal Democrats	Matthew Mellor	871	17.0	N/A
Liberal Democrats	Jonathan Ward	786	15.3	N/A
Green	Emmanuel Valentine	725	14.2	N/A
Green	Barry Greenan	709	13.8	N/A
Green	Aaran Murch	591	11.5	N/A
Turnout		5,121	50.36	
Labour hold				
Labour hold				
Labour hold				

=== 2018 ===
Walpole (3)
Party	Candidate	Votes	%	±%
Labour	Binda Rai	2,465	51.4	+9.7
Labour	Gareth James Shaw	2,394	49.9	+6.0
Labour	Paul Nicholas Joseph Conlan	2,345	48.9	+4.0
Conservative	Ann Chapman	1,547	32.3	−5.5
Conservative	John Cowing	1,387	28.9	−2.9
Conservative	Aleksandra Turner	1,286	26.8	−1.2
Green	Glendra Morley Read	839	17.5	−2.7
Liberal Democrats	Jonathan Michael Ward	574	12.0	+2.6
Liberal Democrats	Humaira Sanders	569	11.9	+3.8
Liberal Democrats	Inge Renate Veecock	518	10.8	+4.3
Turnout		4,793	50.02	
Labour hold		Swing		
Labour hold		Swing		
Labour hold		Swing		

== See also ==
- List of electoral wards in Greater London
