= Elthorne (ward) =

Electoral division in the London Borough of Ealing

- Former electoral ward for the Ealing London Borough Council
- Borough: Ealing
- County: Greater London

Former electoral ward
- Created: 1965
- Abolished: 2022

Elthorne was an electoral ward of the London Borough of Ealing.

The population of Elthorne ward at the 2011 Census was 14,539.

Elthorne was within the Ealing Southall parliamentary constituency. Elthorne was in the London Assembly constituency of Ealing and Hillingdon.

== Ealing council elections ==
=== 2018 election ===
As of 2018, the ward was represented by three Labour councillors.

Elthorne (3)
Party	Candidate	Votes	%	±%
Labour	Yoel Gordon	2,307	47.5	+0.4
Labour	Theresa Mary Byrne	2,261	46.5	+5.1
Labour	Joanna Diana Camadoo	2,173	44.7	+0.7
Liberal Democrats	Nigel Bakhai	1,395	28.7	+3.1
Liberal Democrats	David Malcolm Jollie	1,224	25.2	+11.6
Liberal Democrats	Alastair Martin Beverly Mitton	1,140	23.5	+14.0
Green	Jeremy David Parker	1,020	21.0	+7.8
Conservative	Anita Kapoor	813	16.7	−4.9
Conservative	Ian Michael Potts	743	15.3	−4.4
Conservative	Ali Dima Hussein	661	13.6	−6.2
Renew	Peter Mark Ward	150	3.1	N/A
Turnout		4,861	44.97	
Labour hold		Swing		
Labour hold		Swing		
Labour hold		Swing		

=== 2014 election ===
Elthorne (3)
Party	Candidate	Votes	%	±%
Labour	Yoel Gordon	2,122	47.1	
Labour	Joanna Diana Camadoo	1,981	44.0	
Labour	Peter Elijah Jonathan Mason	1,863	41.4	
Liberal Democrats	Nigel Bakhai	1155	25.6	
Conservative	Anita Kapoor	975	21.6	
Conservative	Fabio Conti	894	19.8	
Conservative	Ian Michael Potts	886	19.7	
Liberal Democrats	Joanna Louise Dugdale	613	13.6	
Green	Suneil Basu	595	13.2	
Green	Christopher Byron Warleigh-Lack	572	12.7	
Liberal Democrats	Harjinder Singh	426	9.5	
UKIP	Laura Stephanie Lyon	416	9.2	
TUSC	Mark Jason Benjamin	136	3.0	
Turnout		4505	41.77	

=== 2010 election ===
Elthorne (3)
Party	Candidate	Votes	%	±%
Labour	Yoel Gordon	2,236	35.9	
Liberal Democrats	Nigel Bakhai	1,974	31.7	
Conservative	Anita Kapoor	1,868	30.0	
Labour	Omer Mahamoud Sheikh Ahmed	1854	29.8	
Labour	Taranjit Kaur Chana	1793	28.8	
Conservative	Robert Lawrence Kirkwood	1782	28.6	
Conservative	Theresa Mullins	1767	28.4	
Liberal Democrats	Peter John Hutchison	1728	27.8	
Liberal Democrats	David John Randles	1494	24.0	
Green	Christopher Byron Warleigh-Lack	768	12.3	
Turnout		6223	61.4	
