= 2018 Ealing London Borough Council election =

2018 local election in England

- 3 May 2018

All 69 seats to Ealing London Borough Council 35 seats needed for a majority

| | First party | Second party | Third party |
|---|---|---|---|
| Party | Labour | Conservative | Liberal Democrats |
| Last election | 53 seats, 53.8% | 12 seats, 27.5% | 4 seats, 9.8% |
| Seats won | 57 | 8 | 4 |
| Seat change | ▲4 | ▼4 | Steady |
| Popular vote | 162,566 | 72,808 | 35,238 |
| Percentage | 56.4% | 25.2% | 12.2% |
| Swing | ▲2.6% | ▼2.3% | ▲2.4% |
- Map of the results of the 2018 Ealing council election. Conservatives in blue, Labour in red and Liberal Democrats in yellow.
Council control before election
Labour
Council control after election
Labour

The 2018 Ealing Council election took place on 3 May 2018 to elect members of Ealing Council in London. The Labour Party increased their majority on the council by gaining four seats from the Conservatives.

== Results ==
Ealing Council election result 2018
| Party | Seats | Gains | Losses | Net gain/loss | Seats % | Votes % | Votes | +/− |
|---|---|---|---|---|---|---|---|---|
| Labour | 57 | 4 | 0 | +4 | 82.6 | 56.4 | 162,566 | +2.6 |
| Conservative | 8 | 0 | 4 | -4 | 11.6 | 25.2 | 72,808 | -2.3 |
| Liberal Democrats | 4 | 0 | 0 | 0 | 5.8 | 12.2 | 35,238 | +2.4 |
| Green | 0 | 0 | 0 | 0 | | 4.0 | 11,533 | ±0.0 |
| Duma Polska | 0 | 0 | 0 | 0 | | 1.4 | 3,973 | New |
| Independent | 0 | 0 | 0 | 0 | | 0.4 | 1,062 | -2.1 |
| UKIP | 0 | 0 | 0 | 0 | | 0.3 | 846 | -1.8 |
| BNP | 0 | 0 | 0 | 0 | | 0.1 | 180 | -0.1 |
| Renew | 0 | 0 | 0 | 0 | | 0.1 | 150 | New |

== Wards and Results ==
| Ward | Lab Seats | Con Seats | Lib Dem Seats | Change from 2014 |
|---|---|---|---|---|
| Acton Central | 3 | 0 | 0 | No Change |
| Cleveland | 3 | 0 | 0 | Labour gains one seat from Conservatives |
| Dormers Wells | 3 | 0 | 0 | No Change |
| Ealing Broadway | 0 | 3 | 0 | No Change |
| Ealing Common | 1 | 1 | 1 | Labour gains one seat from Conservatives |
| East Acton | 3 | 0 | 0 | No Change |
| Elthorne | 3 | 0 | 0 | No Change |
| Greenford Broadway | 3 | 0 | 0 | No Change |
| Greenford Green | 3 | 0 | 0 | No Change |
| Hanger Hill | 0 | 3 | 0 | No Change |
| Hobbayne | 3 | 0 | 0 | No Change |
| Lady Margaret | 3 | 0 | 0 | No Change |
| North Greenford | 3 | 0 | 0 | No Change |
| Northfield | 2 | 1 | 0 | Labour gains two seats from Conservatives |
| Northolt Mandeville | 3 | 0 | 0 | No Change |
| Northolt West End | 3 | 0 | 0 | No Change |
| Norwood Green | 3 | 0 | 0 | No Change |
| Perivale | 3 | 0 | 0 | No Change |
| South Acton | 3 | 0 | 0 | No Change |
| Southall Broadway | 3 | 0 | 0 | No Change |
| Southall Green | 3 | 0 | 0 | No Change |
| Southfield | 0 | 0 | 3 | No Change |
| Walpole | 3 | 0 | 0 | No Change |
| Total | 57 | 8 | 4 | |

== Detailed Results ==
=== Acton Central ===
Acton Central (3)
| Party | Candidate | Votes | % | ±% |
|---|---|---|---|---|
| Labour | Daniel Crawford | 2,267 | 57.6 | +6.7 |
| Labour | Sarah Rooney | 2,153 | 54.7 | +9.3 |
| Labour | Abdullah Gulaid | 2,057 | 52.2 | +7.3 |
| Conservative | Vlod Barchuk | 1,060 | 26.9 | −0.8 |
| Conservative | Liam Walpole | 978 | 24.8 | −4.2 |
| Conservative | Amir Sadjady | 935 | 23.7 | −2.0 |
| Green | Marijn van de Geer | 575 | 14.6 | −0.5 |
| Liberal Democrats | Margaret Joachim | 500 | 12.7 | +4.9 |
| Liberal Democrats | Richard Cunningham | 425 | 10.8 | +3.6 |
| Liberal Democrats | David Zerdin | 294 | 7.5 | +0.2 |
| Turnout | | 3,939 | 39.63 | |
| Labour hold | | Swing | | |
| Labour hold | | Swing | | |
| Labour hold | | Swing | | |

=== Cleveland ===
Cleveland (3)
| Party | Candidate | Votes | % | ±% |
|---|---|---|---|---|
| Labour | Linda Burke | 2,323 | 43.8 | +2.5 |
| Labour | Carlo Lusuardi | 2,245 | 42.4 | +5.3 |
| Labour | Sitarah Anjum | 2,187 | 41.3 | +5.3 |
| Conservative | Ian Proud | 1,696 | 32.0 | −7.9 |
| Conservative | Isobel Grant | 1,634 | 30.8 | −4.9 |
| Conservative | Liz Paice | 1,606 | 30.3 | −4.3 |
| Liberal Democrats | Francesco Fruzza | 1,227 | 23.1 | +6.2 |
| Liberal Democrats | Jo Baldwin-Trott | 985 | 18.6 | +8.4 |
| Liberal Democrats | Athena Zissimos | 813 | 15.3 | +5.8 |
| Green | Ian Douglas | 575 | 10.8 | −7.4 |
| Turnout | | 5,301 | 49.90 | |
| Labour hold | | Swing | | |
| Labour gain from Conservative | | Swing | | |
| Labour hold | | Swing | | |

=== Dormers Wells ===
Dormers Wells (3)
| Party | Candidate | Votes | % | ±% |
|---|---|---|---|---|
| Labour | Tejinder Singh Dhami | 2,890 | 71.7 | −2.3 |
| Labour | Tej Bagha | 2,842 | 70.6 | −2.6 |
| Labour | Ranjit Dheer | 2,751 | 68.3 | −5.1 |
| Conservative | Eileen Harris | 662 | 16.4 | +0.7 |
| Conservative | Abdi-Rashiid Hassan | 618 | 15.3 | −0.1 |
| Conservative | Eva Shack | 572 | 14.2 | +1.7 |
| Green | Nicholas Chapman | 304 | 7.5 | N/A |
| Liberal Democrats | Leslie Glancy | 192 | 4.8 | −1.7 |
| Liberal Democrats | Susan Kendrick | 136 | 3.4 | −4.3 |
| Duma Polska | Anna Jakubiak | 131 | 3.3 | N/A |
| Liberal Democrats | Lyn Woodcock | 110 | 2.7 | −2.2 |
| Duma Polska | Miroslaw Komor | 109 | 2.7 | N/A |
| Duma Polska | Piotr Jakubiak | 105 | 2.6 | N/A |
| Turnout | | 4,028 | 39.97 | |
| Labour hold | | Swing | | |
| Labour hold | | Swing | | |
| Labour hold | | Swing | | |

=== Ealing Broadway ===
In the 2019 General Election, Alexander Stafford was elected as the Conservative Member of Parliament for Rother Valley, in South Yorkshire. He continued to serve as a councillor until 1 April 2020.

Ealing Broadway (3)
| Party | Candidate | Votes | % | ±% |
|---|---|---|---|---|
| Conservative | Alexander Stafford | 1,968 | 44.8 | −2.0 |
| Conservative | Anthony Young | 1,955 | 44.5 | −1.6 |
| Conservative | Seema Kumar | 1,860 | 42.3 | +1.9 |
| Labour | Lainya Offside-Keivani | 1,450 | 33.0 | +4.9 |
| Labour | Nick Pearce | 1,416 | 32.2 | +4.3 |
| Labour | Colin Bastin | 1,365 | 31.1 | +3.8 |
| Liberal Democrats | Joyce Onstad | 789 | 18.0 | +4.9 |
| Green | Meena Hans | 642 | 14.6 | −2.5 |
| Liberal Democrats | Patrick Salau | 627 | 14.3 | +3.2 |
| Liberal Democrats | Toran Shaw | 572 | 13.0 | +3.2 |
| Turnout | | 4,395 | 41.30 | |
| Conservative hold | | Swing | | |
| Conservative hold | | Swing | | |
| Conservative hold | | Swing | | |

=== Ealing Common ===
Ealing Common (3)
| Party | Candidate | Votes | % | ±% |
|---|---|---|---|---|
| Liberal Democrats | Jon Ball | 1,729 | 36.5 | +3.7 |
| Labour | Praveen Anand | 1,572 | 33.2 | +7.9 |
| Conservative | Joanna Dabrowska | 1,531 | 32.3 | −0.8 |
| Labour | Abdi Duale | 1,368 | 28.9 | +5.5 |
| Labour | Sindy Jassal | 1,356 | 28.6 | +6.7 |
| Liberal Democrats | Craig O'Donnell | 1,345 | 28.4 | +5.8 |
| Conservative | Timothy Patten | 1,331 | 28.1 | −5.8 |
| Conservative | Barry Hartness | 1,292 | 27.3 | −2.8 |
| Liberal Democrats | Mark Sanders | 1,216 | 25.7 | −2.2 |
| Green | Daniel van der Spuy | 496 | 10.5 | −3.1 |
| Independent | Alex Zychowski | 385 | 8.1 | N/A |
| Turnout | | 4,736 | 45.58 | |
| Liberal Democrats hold | | Swing | | |
| Labour gain from Conservative | | Swing | | |
| Conservative hold | | Swing | | |

=== East Acton ===
East Acton (3)
| Party | Candidate | Votes | % | ±% |
|---|---|---|---|---|
| Labour | Kate Crawford | 2,740 | 63.4 | +6.4 |
| Labour | Hitesh Tailor | 2,456 | 56.8 | +9.6 |
| Labour | Steve Donnelly | 2,442 | 56.5 | +9.1 |
| Conservative | Krishma Arora | 1,005 | 23.3 | −3.1 |
| Conservative | Jonathan Benveniste | 921 | 21.3 | −3.2 |
| Conservative | Jim Randall | 901 | 20.9 | −4.7 |
| Green | Amanda Souter | 762 | 17.6 | +3.6 |
| Liberal Democrats | Sarah Green | 491 | 11.4 | +3.3 |
| Liberal Democrats | Rory Cunningham | 329 | 7.6 | +1.4 |
| Liberal Democrats | Harvey Rose | 270 | 6.2 | +0.2 |
| Turnout | | 4,321 | 33.12 | |
| Labour hold | | Swing | | |
| Labour hold | | Swing | | |
| Labour hold | | Swing | | |

=== Elthorne ===
Elthorne (3)
| Party | Candidate | Votes | % | ±% |
|---|---|---|---|---|
| Labour | Yoel Gordon | 2,307 | 47.5 | +0.4 |
| Labour | Theresa Byrne | 2,261 | 46.5 | +5.1 |
| Labour | Joanna Camadoo | 2,173 | 44.7 | +0.7 |
| Liberal Democrats | Nigel Bakhai | 1,395 | 28.7 | +3.1 |
| Liberal Democrats | David Jollie | 1,224 | 25.2 | +11.6 |
| Liberal Democrats | Alastair Mitton | 1,140 | 23.5 | +14.0 |
| Green | Jeremy Parker | 1,020 | 21.0 | +7.8 |
| Conservative | Anita Kapoor | 813 | 16.7 | −4.9 |
| Conservative | Ian Potts | 743 | 15.3 | −4.4 |
| Conservative | Ali Hussein | 661 | 13.6 | −6.2 |
| Renew | Peter Ward | 150 | 3.1 | N/A |
| Turnout | | 4,861 | 44.97 | |
| Labour hold | | Swing | | |
| Labour hold | | Swing | | |
| Labour hold | | Swing | | |

=== Greenford Broadway ===
Greenford Broadway (3)
| Party | Candidate | Votes | % | ±% |
|---|---|---|---|---|
| Labour | Julian Bell | 2,940 | 66.5 | −2.1 |
| Labour | Timothy Murtagh | 2,795 | 63.2 | +2.4 |
| Labour | Harbhajan Kaur Dheer | 2,773 | 62.7 | +0.9 |
| Conservative | Peter Edwards | 1,033 | 23.3 | +3.2 |
| Conservative | Lisa Kilduff | 1,026 | 23.2 | +3.3 |
| Conservative | John Usher | 832 | 18.8 | −1.0 |
| Green | Christina Meiklejohn | 346 | 7.8 | N/A |
| Liberal Democrats | Zoe Horwich | 293 | 6.6 | ±0.0 |
| Liberal Democrats | Oliver Murphy | 212 | 4.8 | −1.8 |
| UKIP | Bryan Parry | 164 | 3.7 | N/A |
| Liberal Democrats | John Seymour | 160 | 3.6 | −2.1 |
| Turnout | | 4,424 | 35.00 | |
| Labour hold | | Swing | | |
| Labour hold | | Swing | | |
| Labour hold | | Swing | | |

=== Greenford Green ===
Greenford Green (3)
| Party | Candidate | Votes | % | ±% |
|---|---|---|---|---|
| Labour | Anthony Kelly | 2,411 | 58.2 | +3.6 |
| Labour | Aysha Raza | 2,191 | 52.9 | +3.6 |
| Labour | Simon Woodroofe | 2,114 | 51.0 | +5.1 |
| Conservative | Fred Burley | 1,151 | 27.8 | −7.7 |
| Conservative | Olly Rogers | 941 | 22.7 | −9.7 |
| Conservative | Mariusz Wozniak | 911 | 22.0 | −9.7 |
| Duma Polska | Alicja Glowacka | 347 | 8.4 | N/A |
| Green | Kay Fitzherbert | 333 | 8.0 | −2.1 |
| Duma Polska | Marcin Kaczor | 313 | 7.6 | N/A |
| Duma Polska | Sebastian Przetakowski | 312 | 7.5 | N/A |
| Liberal Democrats | John Maycock | 253 | 6.1 | −0.8 |
| Liberal Democrats | John Ducker | 212 | 5.1 | −0.7 |
| Liberal Democrats | Gillian Rowley | 158 | 3.8 | −1.9 |
| UKIP | Nicholas Markwell | 138 | 3.3 | N/A |
| Turnout | | 4,142 | 38.77 | |
| Labour hold | | Swing | | |
| Labour hold | | Swing | | |
| Labour hold | | Swing | | |

=== Hanger Hill ===
In the 2019 General Election, Joy Morrissey was elected as the Conservative Member of Parliament for Beaconsfield. She continued to serve as a councillor until 14 April 2020.

Hanger Hill (3)
| Party | Candidate | Votes | % | ±% |
|---|---|---|---|---|
| Conservative | Joy Morrissey | 2,002 | 47.6 | −3.3 |
| Conservative | Nigel Sumner | 1,876 | 44.6 | −5.2 |
| Conservative | Greg Stafford | 1,864 | 44.3 | −4.7 |
| Labour | Catherine Wallace | 1,380 | 32.8 | +1.9 |
| Labour | Shabir Ahmed | 1,319 | 31.4 | +5.7 |
| Labour | Kassem Baksh | 1,179 | 28.0 | +4.2 |
| Green | Kate Crossland | 552 | 13.1 | −2.1 |
| Liberal Democrats | Tony Miller | 522 | 12.4 | +1.2 |
| Liberal Democrats | Jane Wright | 484 | 11.5 | ±0.0 |
| Liberal Democrats | Maria Gerakaris-Michanitzis | 457 | 10.9 | −0.3 |
| Duma Polska | Anna Maria | 199 | 4.7 | N/A |
| Duma Polska | Tomasz Chwesiuk | 136 | 3.2 | N/A |
| Duma Polska | Adam Wiktorski | 131 | 3.1 | N/A |
| Turnout | | 4,207 | 40.46 | |
| Conservative hold | | Swing | | |
| Conservative hold | | Swing | | |
| Conservative hold | | Swing | | |

=== Hobbayne ===
Hobbayne (3)
| Party | Candidate | Votes | % | ±% |
|---|---|---|---|---|
| Labour | Lewis Cox | 2,595 | 57.6 | −1.3 |
| Labour | Anna Tomlinson | 2,579 | 57.2 | +1.3 |
| Labour | Ray Wall | 2,479 | 55.0 | −2.6 |
| Conservative | Surendra Dhungan | 1,009 | 22.4 | −9.2 |
| Conservative | Patrick Cusworth | 979 | 21.7 | −2.8 |
| Conservative | Roger Grimshaw | 961 | 21.3 | −2.2 |
| Green | Alan Anderson | 669 | 14.8 | ±0.0 |
| Liberal Democrats | Judith Ducker | 344 | 7.6 | +1.2 |
| Liberal Democrats | Francesco Fruzza | 327 | 7.3 | +2.0 |
| Liberal Democrats | Mo Muman | 284 | 6.3 | +2.9 |
| Duma Polska | Dominik Sitarek | 266 | 5.9 | N/A |
| Duma Polska | Chris Wiciak | 254 | 5.6 | N/A |
| Independent | Daniel McGoun | 210 | 4.7 | N/A |
| Turnout | | 4,507 | 43.53 | |
| Labour hold | | Swing | | |
| Labour hold | | Swing | | |
| Labour hold | | Swing | | |

=== Lady Margaret ===
Lady Margaret (3)
| Party | Candidate | Votes | % | ±% |
|---|---|---|---|---|
| Labour | Karam Mohan | 2,917 | 74.1 | +8.1 |
| Labour | Kamaldeep Kaur Sahota | 2,832 | 72.0 | +4.2 |
| Labour | Swaran Singh Padda | 2,806 | 71.3 | +6.9 |
| Conservative | Neha Chhabra | 582 | 14.8 | −5.7 |
| Conservative | David Scott | 537 | 13.6 | −6.3 |
| Conservative | Max Hunder | 530 | 13.5 | −5.7 |
| Green | Kirstie MacLachlan | 262 | 6.7 | +0.4 |
| Liberal Democrats | Sonul Badiani | 200 | 5.1 | +0.3 |
| Liberal Democrats | Rusi Dalal | 171 | 4.3 | +0.6 |
| Liberal Democrats | Keshav Sorathia | 159 | 4.0 | +0.6 |
| Turnout | | 3,935 | 38.29 | |
| Labour hold | | Swing | | |
| Labour hold | | Swing | | |
| Labour hold | | Swing | | |

=== North Greenford ===
North Greenford (3)
| Party | Candidate | Votes | % | ±% |
|---|---|---|---|---|
| Labour | Amarjit Kaur Jammu | 2,574 | 60.6 | +1.3 |
| Labour | Shahbez Ahmed | 2,571 | 60.6 | +5.3 |
| Labour | Shital Manro | 2,529 | 59.6 | +5.0 |
| Conservative | Natalie Stafford | 993 | 23.4 | −0.3 |
| Conservative | Frank Kilduff | 989 | 23.3 | +2.5 |
| Conservative | Madhava Turumella | 866 | 20.4 | +1.7 |
| Green | Adam Floater | 378 | 8.9 | N/A |
| Liberal Democrats | Roger Davies | 323 | 7.6 | +1.4 |
| Liberal Democrats | Justin Kempley | 304 | 7.2 | +2.3 |
| Liberal Democrats | John Gauss | 283 | 6.7 | −0.6 |
| UKIP | Alex Nieora | 148 | 3.5 | −11.7 |
| Turnout | | 4,245 | 39.62 | |
| Labour hold | | Swing | | |
| Labour hold | | Swing | | |
| Labour hold | | Swing | | |

=== Northfield ===
Northfield (3)
| Party | Candidate | Votes | % | ±% |
|---|---|---|---|---|
| Labour | Fay Block | 2,422 | 46.4 | +12.8 |
| Labour | Paul Driscoll | 2,249 | 43.1 | +10.3 |
| Conservative | David Millican | 2,112 | 40.5 | −3.5 |
| Labour | Ian Kingston | 2,038 | 39.1 | +11.5 |
| Conservative | Fabio Conti | 1,872 | 35.9 | −0.2 |
| Conservative | Theresa Mullins | 1,839 | 35.3 | −2.2 |
| Green | Darren Moore | 1,109 | 21.3 | +5.4 |
| Liberal Democrats | Leslie Hurst | 556 | 10.7 | +1.9 |
| Liberal Democrats | John Mitchell | 538 | 10.8 | +2.1 |
| Liberal Democrats | Gavin Hughes | 432 | 10.3 | +4.3 |
| Turnout | | 5,215 | 53.17 | |
| Labour gain from Conservative | | Swing | | |
| Labour gain from Conservative | | Swing | | |
| Conservative hold | | Swing | | |

=== Northolt Mandeville ===
Northolt Mandeville (3)
| Party | Candidate | Votes | % | ±% |
|---|---|---|---|---|
| Labour | Deirdre Costigan | 2,509 | 62.3 | +10.6 |
| Labour | Chris Summers | 2,399 | 59.6 | +7.0 |
| Labour | Miriam Rice | 2,317 | 57.6 | +6.2 |
| Conservative | Inderjit Anand | 981 | 24.4 | −1.9 |
| Conservative | Paramjit Singh Anand | 974 | 24.2 | −1.5 |
| Conservative | John Ross | 889 | 22.1 | −1.5 |
| Green | Katy Barton | 420 | 10.4 | N/A |
| Liberal Democrats | Loreta Alac | 295 | 7.3 | +2.2 |
| UKIP | Peter McIlvenna | 209 | 5.2 | +11.5 |
| Liberal Democrats | Lee Horwich | 190 | 4.7 | +0.5 |
| Liberal Democrats | Luke Nash | 178 | 4.4 | +0.3 |
| Turnout | | 4,026 | 36.50 | |
| Labour hold | | Swing | | |
| Labour hold | | Swing | | |
| Labour hold | | Swing | | |

=== Northolt West End ===
Northolt West End (3)
| Party | Candidate | Votes | % | ±% |
|---|---|---|---|---|
| Labour | Bassam Mahfouz | 2,391 | 67.2 | +6.5 |
| Labour | Dee Martin | 2,373 | 66.7 | +6.9 |
| Labour | Lauren Wall | 2,328 | 65.4 | +7.0 |
| Conservative | Heather Millican | 657 | 18.5 | +2.1 |
| Conservative | Richard Stevens | 631 | 17.7 | +1.9 |
| Conservative | Chris Young | 540 | 15.2 | ±0.0 |
| Green | Elizabeth Humphries | 278 | 7.8 | N/A |
| UKIP | Stephen Haude | 187 | 5.3 | −15.4 |
| Duma Polska | Jola Ludwin | 181 | 5.1 | N/A |
| BNP | David Furness | 180 | 5.1 | −4.1 |
| Liberal Democrats | Alan Miller | 135 | 3.8 | −1.5 |
| Liberal Democrats | Andrew Mitchell | 124 | 3.5 | −0.6 |
| Liberal Democrats | Myer Salaman | 98 | 2.8 | −0.9 |
| Turnout | | 3,557 | 33.55 | |
| Labour hold | | Swing | | |
| Labour hold | | Swing | | |
| Labour hold | | Swing | | |

=== Norwood Green ===
Norwood Green (3)
| Party | Candidate | Votes | % | ±% |
|---|---|---|---|---|
| Labour | Gurmit Kaur Mann | 2,442 | 67.2 | −2.3 |
| Labour | Mohammad Aslam | 2,402 | 66.1 | −0.4 |
| Labour | Rajinder Singh Mann | 2,394 | 65.8 | −2.8 |
| Conservative | Amandeep Singh Gill | 743 | 20.4 | +1.2 |
| Conservative | Matteo Conti | 609 | 16.7 | +1.4 |
| Conservative | George Lafford | 584 | 16.1 | −2.1 |
| Green | Sarah McCartney | 299 | 8.2 | +1.5 |
| Liberal Democrats | Margaret Horwich | 214 | 5.9 | +1.4 |
| Liberal Democrats | Dominic James | 179 | 4.9 | +0.7 |
| Liberal Democrats | Nigel Bliss | 177 | 4.9 | +2.1 |
| Turnout | | 3,636 | 35.88 | |
| Labour hold | | Swing | | |
| Labour hold | | Swing | | |
| Labour hold | | Swing | | |

=== Perivale ===
Perivale (3)
| Party | Candidate | Votes | % | ±% |
|---|---|---|---|---|
| Labour | Munir Ahmed | 2,921 | 58.8 | +7.3 |
| Labour | Tariq Mahmood | 2,763 | 55.6 | +8.2 |
| Labour | Charan Sharma | 2,732 | 55.0 | +7.0 |
| Conservative | Anu Khela | 1,217 | 24.5 | −5.2 |
| Conservative | James Challinor | 1,216 | 24.5 | +3.0 |
| Conservative | Edmond Yeo | 1,145 | 23.0 | +6.5 |
| Duma Polska | Marta Banovich | 381 | 7.7 | N/A |
| Duma Polska | Caesar Olszewski | 381 | 7.7 | N/A |
| Duma Polska | Tomasz Zukowski | 356 | 7.2 | N/A |
| Green | Sebastian Diamond | 330 | 6.6 | −3.7 |
| Liberal Democrats | Robert Browning | 256 | 5.2 | −0.5 |
| Liberal Democrats | Patrick White | 242 | 4.9 | −0.2 |
| Liberal Democrats | Pantea Etessami | 143 | 2.9 | −1.9 |
| Turnout | | 4,970 | 43.75 | |
| Labour hold | | Swing | | |
| Labour hold | | Swing | | |
| Labour hold | | Swing | | |

=== South Acton ===
South Acton (3)
| Party | Candidate | Votes | % | ±% |
|---|---|---|---|---|
| Labour | Yvonne Johnson | 2,279 | 55.9 | +6.1 |
| Labour | Josh Blacker | 2,168 | 53.2 | +4.9 |
| Labour | Mik Sabiers | 1,986 | 48.7 | +6.5 |
| Conservative | Sara Kumar | 943 | 23.1 | −7.0 |
| Conservative | Andy Kalkhoran | 887 | 21.8 | −7.4 |
| Conservative | Ali Naiery | 792 | 19.4 | −4.4 |
| Liberal Democrats | Doreen James | 506 | 12.4 | +3.9 |
| Green | Marc Tonti | 459 | 11.3 | −3.7 |
| Liberal Democrats | Nicholas Winkfield | 436 | 10.7 | +2.2 |
| Liberal Democrats | David Antoni | 399 | 9.8 | +4.1 |
| Independent | Dan Meskell | 264 | 6.5 | +0.9 |
| Independent | Bob Little | 203 | 5.0 | −3.7 |
| Duma Polska | Marta Iwaniak | 197 | 4.8 | N/A |
| Duma Polska | Dorota Stec | 174 | 4.3 | N/A |
| Turnout | | 4,077 | 38.84 | |
| Labour hold | | Swing | | |
| Labour hold | | Swing | | |
| Labour hold | | Swing | | |

=== Southall Broadway ===
Southall Broadway (3)
| Party | Candidate | Votes | % | ±% |
|---|---|---|---|---|
| Labour | Jaskiran Kaur Chohan | 3,726 | 79.0 | +19.3 |
| Labour | Karanvir Singh Dhadwal | 3,467 | 73.5 | +14.4 |
| Labour | Kamaljit Kaur Nagpal | 3,458 | 73.3 | +13.3 |
| Conservative | Darshan Singh Bhinder | 615 | 13.0 | +8.6 |
| Conservative | Mohamed Ali | 509 | 10.8 | +5.3 |
| Conservative | Mohamed Fahmy | 392 | 8.3 | +3.0 |
| Liberal Democrats | Hafeez Ahmad | 349 | 7.4 | +4.2 |
| Green | Rosalie Hans-Barker | 229 | 4.9 | N/A |
| Liberal Democrats | Shao-Ying Ben-Nathan | 224 | 4.7 | +2.4 |
| Liberal Democrats | Heather Matthews | 183 | 3.9 | +2.3 |
| Turnout | | 4,718 | 44.70 | |
| Labour hold | | Swing | | |
| Labour hold | | Swing | | |
| Labour hold | | Swing | | |

=== Southall Green ===
Southall Green (3)
| Party | Candidate | Votes | % | ±% |
|---|---|---|---|---|
| Labour | Jasbir Kaur Anand | 3,806 | 82.6 | −1.2 |
| Labour | Kamaljit Singh Dhindsa | 3,742 | 81.2 | −0.2 |
| Labour | Peter Mason | 3,602 | 78.2 | −1.9 |
| Conservative | Avdar Chand | 578 | 12.5 | +1.2 |
| Conservative | Carol Gilby | 441 | 9.6 | −0.3 |
| Conservative | George Illsley | 377 | 8.2 | −0.3 |
| Green | Ineta Hans-Barker | 177 | 3.8 | N/A |
| Liberal Democrats | Dorothy Brooks | 145 | 3.1 | −1.3 |
| Liberal Democrats | Margaret Friday | 115 | 2.5 | −1.1 |
| Liberal Democrats | Michael Pidoux | 82 | 1.8 | −1.3 |
| Turnout | | 4,606 | 41.79 | |
| Labour hold | | Swing | | |
| Labour hold | | Swing | | |
| Labour hold | | Swing | | |

=== Southfield ===
Southfield (3)
| Party | Candidate | Votes | % | ±% |
|---|---|---|---|---|
| Liberal Democrats | Gary Malcolm | 2,217 | 46.5 | +6.0 |
| Liberal Democrats | Gary Busuttil | 2,136 | 44.8 | +4.3 |
| Liberal Democrats | Andrew Steed | 2,074 | 43.5 | +6.7 |
| Conservative | Vanessa Costello | 1,429 | 30.0 | −3.8 |
| Conservative | Julian Gallant | 1,333 | 28.0 | +0.6 |
| Conservative | Andrew MacDonald | 1,322 | 27.8 | +1.7 |
| Labour | Jacqueline Davies | 1,023 | 21.5 | +1.1 |
| Labour | Peter Evans | 981 | 20.6 | +1.4 |
| Labour | Tony Loftus | 839 | 17.6 | +2.1 |
| Green | Michael Landon | 479 | 10.1 | −5.0 |
| Turnout | | 4,763 | 46.57 | |
| Liberal Democrats hold | | Swing | | |
| Liberal Democrats hold | | Swing | | |
| Liberal Democrats hold | | Swing | | |

=== Walpole ===
Walpole (3)
| Party | Candidate | Votes | % | ±% |
|---|---|---|---|---|
| Labour | Binda Rai | 2,465 | 51.4 | +9.7 |
| Labour | Gareth Shaw | 2,394 | 49.9 | +6.0 |
| Labour | Paul Conlan | 2,345 | 48.9 | +4.0 |
| Conservative | Ann Chapman | 1,547 | 32.3 | −5.5 |
| Conservative | John Cowing | 1,387 | 28.9 | −2.9 |
| Conservative | Aleksandra Turner | 1,286 | 26.8 | −1.2 |
| Green | Glendra Read | 839 | 17.5 | −2.7 |
| Liberal Democrats | Jonathan Ward | 574 | 12.0 | +2.6 |
| Liberal Democrats | Humaira Sanders | 569 | 11.9 | +3.8 |
| Liberal Democrats | Inge Veecock | 518 | 10.8 | +4.3 |
| Turnout | | 4,793 | 50.02 | |
| Labour hold | | Swing | | |
| Labour hold | | Swing | | |
| Labour hold | | Swing | | |

== By-elections ==
=== Ealing Broadway ===
Ealing Broadway: 6 May 2021
| Party | Candidate | Votes | % | ±% |
|---|---|---|---|---|
| Conservative | Julian Gallant | 2,076 | 38.0 | −2.6 |
| Labour | Claire Tighe | 1,601 | 29.3 | −0.6 |
| Liberal Democrats | Christopher Wyatt | 977 | 17.9 | +1.6 |
| Green | Meena Hans | 716 | 13.1 | −0.1 |
| Workers Party | Daniel Cosby | 58 | 1.1 | N/A |
| TUSC | Helen Pattison | 32 | 0.6 | N/A |
| Majority | | 475 | 8.7 | |
| Turnout | | 5,460 | | |
| Conservative hold | | Swing | ▼1.0 | |

=== Hanger Hill ===
Hanger Hill: 6 May 2021
| Party | Candidate | Votes | % | ±% |
|---|---|---|---|---|
| Conservative | Fabio Conti | 1,762 | 35.9 | −7.1 |
| Labour | Grace Quansah | 1,397 | 28.5 | −1.1 |
| Liberal Democrats | Athena Zissimos | 1,100 | 22.4 | +11.2 |
| Green | Kate Crossland | 611 | 12.5 | +0.6 |
| TUSC | David Hofman | 33 | 0.7 | N/A |
| Majority | | 365 | 7.4 | |
| Turnout | | 4,903 | | |
| Conservative hold | | Swing | ▼3.0 | |

=== Hobbayne (6 May 2021) ===
Hobbayne: 6 May 2021
| Party | Candidate | Votes | % | ±% |
|---|---|---|---|---|
| Labour | Louise Brett | 2,345 | 48.3 | −2.7 |
| Conservative | David Castle | 1,477 | 30.4 | +10.6 |
| Green | Emily Grassi | 609 | 12.5 | −0.6 |
| Liberal Democrats | Alastair Mitton | 366 | 7.5 | +0.7 |
| TUSC | Tony Gill | 56 | 1.2 | N/A |
| Majority | | 868 | 17.9 | |
| Turnout | | 4,853 | | |
| Labour hold | | Swing | ▼6.7 | |

=== Hobbayne (16 September 2021) ===
Hobbayne: 16 September 2021
| Party | Candidate | Votes | % | ±% |
|---|---|---|---|---|
| Labour Co-op | Claire Tighe | 1,617 | 52.2 | |
| Conservative | David Castle | 865 | 27.9 | |
| Green | Alan Anderson | 362 | 11.7 | |
| Liberal Democrats | Alastair Mitton | 207 | 6.7 | |
| TUSC | Tony Gill | 48 | 1.5 | |
| Majority | | 752 | 24.3 | |
| Turnout | | 3,113 | 31.1 | |
| Labour Co-op hold | | Swing | | |
