= John Zylinski =

British property developer and Polish aristocrat (1951–2024)

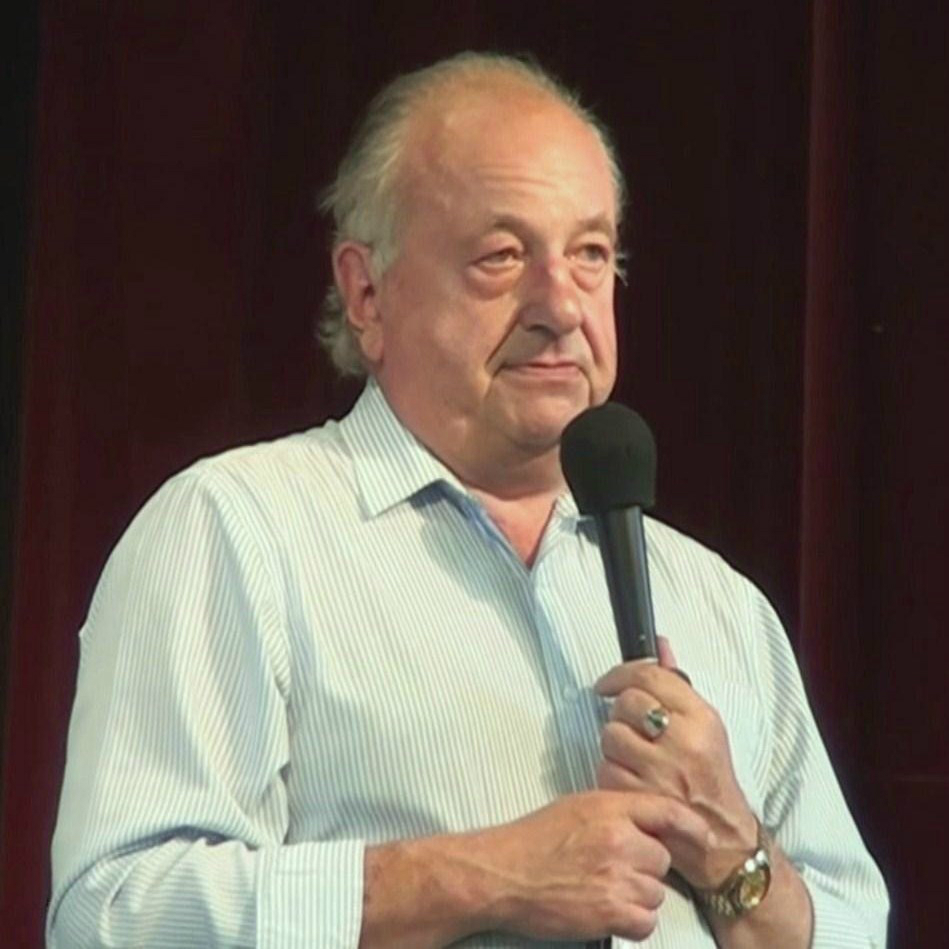
- Born: Jan Andrzej Zylinski; 25 July 1951; Lewisham, London, England
- Died: 3 January 2024 (aged 72)
- Education: St Benedict's School, Ealing; London School of Economics

John Zylinski, also known as Jan or Janek Zylinski (25 July 1951 – 3 January 2024) was a Polish property developer living in United Kingdom who claimed to be a prince from a line of Polish aristocracy but grew up in the émigré community in London after the Second World War. His early career was in art journalism and he established an art business. He then became a property developer, specialising in fixer-uppers, and made a fortune. He was known for his public activism and support for Polish causes in the United Kingdom, recreating a Polish palace in Ealing, and founding the charity Polish Heroes and a political party, Duma Polska – Polish Pride.

In 2016, Zylinski ran for the office of London mayor as an independent, appearing on the ballot paper as "Prince Zylinski" and having a focus on appealing to European residents. He had previously drawn attention in 2015 for challenging Nigel Farage to a duel in Hyde Park over his comments on immigrants.

He was a frequent commentator on Polish rights in the UK, including campaigning for a Polish statue to World War II heroes in Hyde Park, and founding a charity called Polish Heroes which aimed to celebrate the contribution and heroism of Poles in World War Two.

== Duma Polska ==
Duma Polska = Polish Pride
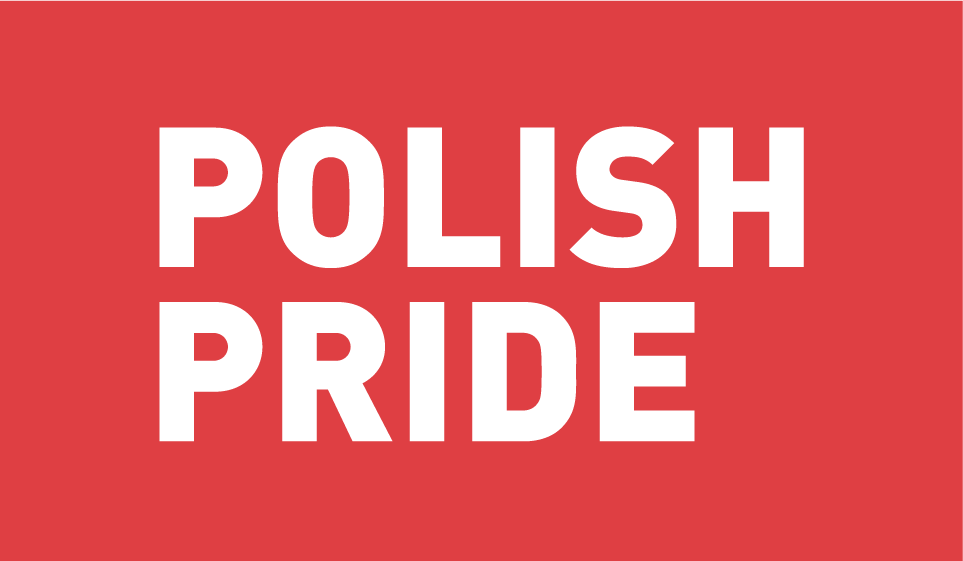
- Leader: John Zylinski
- Founded: February 2018
- Dissolved: October 2019
- Headquarters: London
- Ideology: Minority rights Pro-Europeanism
- Local government: 0 / 20,270

Website
- www.polishpride.org

Duma Polska = Polish Pride, also known as Duma Polska or Polish Pride, was a political party in the United Kingdom, founded by John Zylinski in 2018, which sought to represent European Union citizens on a pro-European platform.

=== Electoral history ===
In the May 2018 local elections, the party fielded 48 candidates across 16 London boroughs, and sought to appeal to Polish and other minority group voters concerned by Brexit with a platform that centred on increased EU citizen rights in the UK and a specific hate crime for anti-European discrimination.

Duma Polska received 6,983 votes (approximately 0.1% of the vote in London) and no seats. It did not contest any subsequent elections.

== Personal life ==
He died of heart failure in 2024, aged 72. He is survived by his brother, family and his partner.

He identified as a Eurosceptic, although voted to remain in the 2016 EU membership referendum and was concerned about the effects of Brexit and its impact on Poles in the UK.
