= Northolt West End =

Electoral ward in London, England

- Electoral ward for the Ealing London Borough Council
- Borough: Ealing
- County: Greater London
- Population: 16,536 (2021)
- Major settlements: Northolt
- Area: 3.549 km²

Current electoral ward
- Created: 1965 (as West End)
- Councillors: Atlyn Forde; Bassam Mahfouz; Dee Martin
- GSS code: E05013532

Northolt West End (known as West End until 2002) is an electoral ward in the London Borough of Ealing. It elects three councillors to Ealing London Borough Council.

== Ward profile ==
The ward is the westernmost in the London Borough of Ealing, and covers most of the southern half of Northolt.

== Councillors ==
Election	Councillors		
1964	Kenneth Acock (Labour)	E. J. Jones (Labour)	A. W. Surry (Labour)
1968	Kenneth Acock (Labour)	Raymond Edwards (Labour)	A. W. Surry (Labour)
1971	Kenneth Acock (Labour)	Raymond Edwards (Labour)	A. W. Surry (Labour)
1974	Kenneth Acock (Labour)	Raymond Edwards (Labour)	A. W. Surry (Labour)
1978	Andrew Gill (Labour)	Raymond Edwards (Labour)	Ronald Johnson (Labour)
1982	Ernest Dunckley (Labour)	Raymond Edwards (Labour)	Frank Impey (Labour)
1985 by-election	Ernest Dunckley (Labour)	Ronald Johnson (Labour)	Frank Impey (Labour)
1986	Ernest Dunckley (Labour)	Ronald Johnson (Labour)	Frank Impey (Labour)
1990	Ernest Dunckley (Labour)	James Heydinrych (Conservative)	David Varney (Conservative)
1994	Ernest Dunckley (Labour)	Frank Impey (Labour)	David Bond (Labour)
1998	Ernest Dunckley (Labour)	Frank Impey (Labour)	David Bond (Labour)
2002	Michael Elliott (Labour)	Sophie Hosking (Labour)	David Bond (Labour)
2005 by-election	Michael Elliott (Labour)	Bassam Mahfouz (Labour)	David Bond (Labour)
2006	Michael Elliott (Labour)	Bassam Mahfouz (Labour)	Brian Reeves (Labour)
2010	Lauren Wall (Labour)	Bassam Mahfouz (Labour)	Brian Reeves (Labour)
2014	Lauren Wall (Labour)	Bassam Mahfouz (Labour)	Dee Martin (Labour)
2018	Lauren Wall (Labour)	Bassam Mahfouz (Labour)	Dee Martin (Labour)
2022	Lauren Wall (Labour)	Bassam Mahfouz (Labour)	Dee Martin (Labour)
2026	Atlyn Forde (Labour)	Bassam Mahfouz (Labour)	Dee Martin (Labour)

== Elections ==
=== Elections in the 2020s ===
2026 Ealing London Borough Council election: Northolt West End (3 seats)
Party	Candidate	Votes	%	±%
Labour	Atlyn Forde	1,568		
Labour	Bassam Mahfouz	1,490		
Labour	Dee Martin	1,369		
Green	Ryan Jendoubi	866		
Reform	Lee Marriott	835		
Reform	Maxine Williams	793		
Reform	Seb Wallace	787		
Conservative	Fabio Conti	630		
Conservative	Janet Young	546		
Conservative	Diva Nazari	458		
Liberal Democrats	Lee Horwich	309		
Liberal Democrats	Milena Izmirlieva	291		
Liberal Democrats	Tony Miller	272		
Turnout		TBC	TBC	
Labour hold		Swing		
Labour hold		Swing		
Labour hold		Swing		

2022 Ealing London Borough Council election: Northolt West End (3)
Party	Candidate	Votes	%	±%
Labour	Dee Martin	2,170	64.6	N/A
Labour	Lauren Wall	2,164	64.4	N/A
Labour	Bassam Mahfouz	2,076	61.8	N/A
Conservative	Jamal Ahmed	661	19.7	N/A
Conservative	Abul Sarker	582	17.3	N/A
Conservative	Mohammed Uddin	538	16.0	N/A
Green	Natalia Kubica	439	13.1	N/A
Liberal Democrats	Lee Horwich	301	9.0	N/A
Liberal Democrats	Bridgette Chalu	256	7.6	N/A
Liberal Democrats	Niall Haughian	248	7.4	N/A
Registered electors		10,406		
Turnout		3,361	32.30	N/A
Labour win (new boundaries)				
Labour win (new boundaries)				
Labour win (new boundaries)				

=== Elections in the 2010s ===
2018 Ealing London Borough Council election: Northolt West End (3)
Party	Candidate	Votes	%	±%
Labour	Bassam Mahfouz	2,391	67.2	+6.5
Labour	Dee Martin	2,373	66.7	+6.9
Labour	Lauren Wall	2,328	65.4	+7.0
Conservative	Heather Millican	657	18.5	+2.1
Conservative	Richard Stevens	631	17.7	+1.9
Conservative	Chris Young	540	15.2	±0.0
Green	Elizabeth Humphries	278	7.8	N/A
UKIP	Stephen Haude	187	5.3	−15.4
Duma Polska	Jola Ludwin	181	5.1	N/A
BNP	David Furness	180	5.1	−4.1
Liberal Democrats	Alan Miller	135	3.8	−1.5
Liberal Democrats	Andrew Mitchell	124	3.5	−0.6
Liberal Democrats	Myer Salaman	98	2.8	−0.9
Registered electors		10,602		
Turnout		3,557	33.55	
Labour hold		Swing		
Labour hold		Swing		
Labour hold		Swing		

2014 Ealing London Borough Council election: Northolt West End (3)
Party	Candidate	Votes	%	±%
Labour	Bassam Mahfouz	2,391	60.7	+13.7
Labour	Dee Martin	2,354	59.8	+10.1
Labour	Lauren Wall	2,299	58.4	+13.7
UKIP	Roy Schofield	814	20.7	N/A
Conservative	Wojciech Alberti	644	16.4	−12.9
Conservative	Richard Stevens	623	15.8	−13.0
Conservative	Catherine McColgan	599	15.2	−11.9
BNP	David Furness	362	9.2	−0.4
Liberal Democrats	John Seymour	208	5.3	−9.7
Liberal Democrats	Pantea Etessami	160	4.1	−9.2
Liberal Democrats	Henry Gyi	144	3.7	−6.9
Registered electors		10,374		
Turnout		3,936	37.95	
Labour hold		Swing		
Labour hold		Swing		
Labour hold		Swing		

2010 Ealing London Borough Council election: Northolt West End (3)
Party	Candidate	Votes	%	±%
Labour	Brian Reeves	2,833	49.7	
Labour	Bassam Mahfouz	2,679	47.0	
Labour	Lauren Wall	2,548	44.7	
Conservative	Michael Mina	1,669	29.3	
Conservative	Hasil Makkar	1,642	28.8	
Conservative	Bud Klair	1,545	27.1	
Liberal Democrats	Victoria Gill	854	15.0	
Liberal Democrats	Judith Ducker	758	13.3	
Liberal Democrats	Pantea Etessami	601	10.6	
BNP	David Furness	548	9.6	
Registered electors		9,780		
Turnout		5,695	58.24	
Labour hold		Swing		
Labour hold		Swing		
Labour hold		Swing		

The election took place on the same day as the 2010 general election.

=== Elections in the 2000s ===
2006 Ealing London Borough Council election: Northolt West End (3)
Party	Candidate	Votes	%	±%
Labour	Bassam Mahfouz	1,299	46.6	
Labour	Michael Elliott	1,283		
Labour	Brian Reeves	1,236		
Conservative	Ivor Bush	1,004	36.0	
Conservative	Leslie Pickett	998		
Conservative	George Harris	992		
Liberal Democrats	Judith Ducker	487	17.5	
Liberal Democrats	Caroline Moir	427		
Liberal Democrats	Pantea Etessami	383		
Registered electors		9,651		
Turnout			30.56	
Labour hold		Swing		
Labour hold		Swing		
Labour hold		Swing		

Northolt West End by-election, 5 May 2005
Party	Candidate	Votes	%	±%
Labour	Bassam Mahfouz	2,545	51.6	−8.5
Conservative	Ruth Goldsborough	1,566	31.8	+3.1
Liberal Democrats	Judith Ducker	820	16.6	+5.1
Majority		979	19.8	
Turnout		4,931		
Labour hold		Swing		

The by-election was called following the resignation of Cllr Sophie Hosking. It was held on the same day as the 2005 general election.

2002 Ealing London Borough Council election: Northolt West End (3)
Party	Candidate	Votes	%	±%
Labour	David Bond	1,487	61.2	
Labour	Sophie Hosking	1,338		
Labour	Michael Elliott	1,299		
Conservative	Bernard Furzer	672	27.6	
Conservative	Joan Trinder	664		
Conservative	Hugh Mordaunt	632		
Liberal Democrats	Judith Ducker	272	11.2	
Liberal Democrats	Patrick Dee	248		
Liberal Democrats	Ida Goodwin	245		
Registered electors		9,447		
Turnout			26.4	
Labour win (new boundaries)				
Labour win (new boundaries)				
Labour win (new boundaries)				
