= Ealing London Borough Council elections =

Local government elections in London, England

A map showing the wards of Ealing from 2002- 2022 (new boundaries came into force in 2022)

Ealing Council is the local authority for the London Borough of Ealing. It is elected every four years.

== Political control ==
The first election to the council was held in 1964, initially operating as a shadow authority before the new system came into full effect in 1965. Political control of the council since 1964 has been held by the following parties:

Election	Overall Control	Labour	Conservative	Lib Dem	Ind./Res.	Greens
1964	Labour	34	26	-	-	-
1968	Conservative	5	53	-	2	-
1971	Labour	40	20	-	-	-
1974	Labour	36	24	-	-	-
1978	Conservative	28	41	-	1	-
1982	Conservative	30	37	3	-	-
1986	Labour	47	20	3	-	-
1990	Conservative	20	40	-	-	-
1994	Labour	48	20	3	-	-
1998	Labour	53	15	3	-	-
2002	Labour	48	17	4	-	-
2006	Conservative	29	37	3	-	-
2010	Labour	40	24	5	-	-
2014	Labour	53	12	4	-	-
2018	Labour	57	8	4	-	-
2022	Labour	59	5	6	-	-
2026	Labour	46	5	13	1	5

== Council elections ==
- 1964 Ealing London Borough Council election
- 1968 Ealing London Borough Council election
- 1971 Ealing London Borough Council election
- 1974 Ealing London Borough Council election
- 1978 Ealing London Borough Council election (boundary changes increased the number of seats by ten)
- 1982 Ealing London Borough Council election
- 1986 Ealing London Borough Council election
- 1990 Ealing London Borough Council election
- 1994 Ealing London Borough Council election (boundary changes increased the number of seats by one) (Note: The Ealing, Hammersmith and Fulham, and Hounslow (London Borough Boundaries) Order 1993) (Note: The Ealing, Hillingdon and Hounslow (London Borough Boundaries) Order 1993) (Note: The North and Central London (London Borough Boundaries) Order 1993)
- 1998 Ealing London Borough Council election
- 2002 Ealing London Borough Council election (boundary changes reduced the number of seats by two)
- 2006 Ealing London Borough Council election
- 2010 Ealing London Borough Council election
- 2014 Ealing London Borough Council election
- 2018 Ealing London Borough Council election
- 2022 Ealing London Borough Council election (boundary changes increased the number of seats by one)
- 2026 Ealing London Borough Council election

== Borough result maps ==
2002 results map

2006 results map

2010 results map

2014 results map

2018 results map

2022 results map

2026 results map

== By-election results ==
=== 1964–1968 ===
There were no by-elections.

=== 1968–1971 ===
Central by-election, 27 June 1968
Party	Candidate	Votes	%	±%
Conservative	K. L. Kettle	1771		
Labour	I. A. Williams	344		
Liberal	J. Martin-Kaye	213		
Turnout			19.1%	

Walpole by-election, 27 June 1968
Party	Candidate	Votes	%	±%
Conservative	R. E. T. Spencer	1609		
Labour	P. Downham	467		
Liberal	F. F. P. Moore	142		
National Front	B. E. Holbrook	63		
Turnout			21.2%	

Hanger Hill by-election, 27 March 1969
Party	Candidate	Votes	%	±%
Conservative	R. A. V. M. Fenner	2143		
Labour	P. C. Eckles	684		
Liberal	N. J. Reed	224		
Turnout			34.0%	

Dormers Wells by-election, 19 March 1970
Party	Candidate	Votes	%	±%
Conservative	M. F. Jennings	1846		
Conservative	D. R. Lewis	1813		
Labour	T. Cheesman	1249		
Labour	P. W. Sennett	1211		
National Front	D. C. Pooley	343		
National Front	J. Shaw	329		
Turnout			31.4%	

=== 1971–1974 ===
Glebe by-election, 27 April 1972
Party	Candidate	Votes	%	±%
Labour	O. Barlow	1,456		
Conservative	G. Goold	724		
Liberal	C. L. Joseph	144		
Turnout			25.8%	

Mandeville by-election, 27 April 1972
Party	Candidate	Votes	%	±%
Labour	T. F. Durkin	2,088		
Conservative	D. J. Hart	1,428		
Turnout			38.8%	

=== 1974–1978 ===
Northfields by-election, 25 March 1976
Party	Candidate	Votes	%	±%
Conservative	Brian P. Parke	2,027		
Labour	Malam Atkins	1,113		
Liberal	Peter C. D. Hankinson	490		
Turnout			38.8	

Walpole by-election, 25 March 1976
Party	Candidate	Votes	%	±%
Conservative	Vladimir Kopecky	1,550		
Labour	William Morgan	1,191		
Liberal	Graham D. Smith	452		
Turnout			31.9	

Glebe by-election, 8 April 1976
Party	Candidate	Votes	%	±%
Labour	Rabindara N. S. Pathak	1,585		
Conservative	Peter J. Jenkins	899		
Liberal	Kenneth R. Stevens	483		
Turnout			30.3	

Southfield by-election, 8 April 1976
Party	Candidate	Votes	%	±%
Conservative	Eleanor C. Withers	1,939		
Labour	Valerie O. Eckles	1,758		
Liberal	Christopher D. Hallawell	274		
Turnout			42.2	

=== 1978–1982 ===
Mount Pleasant by-election, 5 April 1979
Party	Candidate	Votes	%	±%
Labour	Bhagwan Deol	1,501		
Independent	John Beeston	815		
Conservative	Barbara McPeake	466		
Liberal	Sally Lippiatt	188		
Turnout			32.6	
Labour hold		Swing		

The by-election was called following the death of Cllr John Johnston.

Argyle by-election, 27 September 1979
Party	Candidate	Votes	%	±%
Conservative	Joan Ansell	1,258		
Labour	Julian Kay	953		
Liberal	Ely Piggott	223		
National Front	James Shaw	64		
Education Party	Colin Lomas	48		
Turnout			28.0	
Conservative hold		Swing		

The by-election was called following the resignation of Cllr Mildred Taylor.

Walpole by-election, 27 September 1979
Party	Candidate	Votes	%	±%
Labour	Hilary Benn	1,637		
Conservative	Philip Circus	1,352		
Liberal	Oliver Murphy	301		
National Front	Ernest Pendrous	53		
Turnout			33.6	
Labour gain from Conservative		Swing		

The by-election was called following the resignation of Cllr Christopher Stenlake.

=== 1982–1986 ===
Wood End by-election, 29 September 1983
Party	Candidate	Votes	%	±%
Liberal Alliance FT	Angela Ilbrey	1,806		
Conservative	Wlodzimierz Diemko	893		
Labour	Anthony Miller	794		
Turnout			41.7	
Liberal Alliance FT hold		Swing		

The by-election was called following the resignation of Cllr Graham Wakeling.

Argyle by-election, 17 November 1983
Party	Candidate	Votes	%	±%
Conservative	Henry Allen	1,696		
Labour	Michael Lewis	1,431		
Alliance	Julian Kay	450		
Turnout			41.7	
Conservative hold		Swing		

The by-election was called following the resignation of Cllr Beatrice Howard.

Hobbayne by-election, 26 April 1984
Party	Candidate	Votes	%	±%
Labour	Francis Curtis	1,869		
Conservative	Philip Richardson	1,097		
Alliance	Elizabeth Smith	562		
Turnout			43.5	
Labour hold		Swing		

The by-election was called following the resignation of Cllr Peter Eckles.

Victoria by-election, 13 September 1984
Party	Candidate	Votes	%	±%
Labour	Philip Portwood	1,153		
Conservative	Gina Hearn	975		
Alliance	James Reville	217		
Ind. Conservative	Jozef Joseph	28		
Turnout			45.6	
Labour gain from Conservative		Swing		

The by-election was called following the death of Cllr John Wyndham-Kaye.

West End by-election, 21 March 1985
Party	Candidate	Votes	%	±%
Labour	Ronald Johnson	1,857		
Conservative	Jeremy Mindell	717		
Alliance	Roger Fox	368		
Turnout			32.2	
Labour hold		Swing		

The by-election was called following the death of Cllr Raymond Edwards.

=== 1986–1990 ===
Wood End by-election, 22 September 1988
Party	Candidate	Votes	%	±%
Conservative	Brenda Hall	1,293		
Lib Dem Focus Team	Lyn Woodcock	1,068		
Labour	Shabira Moledina	457		
Turnout			32.98	
Conservative gain from Lib Dem Focus Team		Swing		

The by-election was called following the resignation of Cllr Angela Ilbrey.

Waxlow by-election, 17 November 1988
Party	Candidate	Votes	%	±%
Conservative	Eileen Harris	1,517		
Labour	Chanan Lachhar	1,084		
Independent Green	Michael Morrewski	123		
Turnout			30.35	
Conservative gain from Labour		Swing		

The by-election was called following the resignation of Cllr Percival Sennett.

Hobbayne by-election, 16 February 1989
Party	Candidate	Votes	%	±%
Conservative	Derek Lewis	1,547		
Labour	Graham White	1,020		
Liberal Democrats	Alan Whelan	868		
Turnout			40.23	
Conservative gain from Labour		Swing		

The by-election was called following the resignation of Cllr Francis Curtis.

Northfield by-election, 15 June 1989
Party	Candidate	Votes	%	±%
Conservative	Wiktor Lewanski	2,353		
Labour	Colin Bastin	1,493		
Liberal Democrats	Michael Lourie	586		
Independent Green	Jacqueline Kingham	224		
Green	Astra Seibe	211		
Turnout			51.28	
Conservative gain from Labour		Swing		

The by-election was called following the resignation of Cllr John Collisson.

=== 1990–1994 ===
Northfield by-election, 13 December 1990
Party	Candidate	Votes	%	±%
Conservative	David Millican	1,665	51.3	
Labour	Stephen A. Sears	1,204	37.1	
Liberal Democrats	Philip J. Hurst	271	8.3	
Green	Christina L. Meiklejohn	107	3.3	
Turnout			33.7	
Conservative hold		Swing		

The by-election was called following the death of Cllr Robert Hetherington.

Dormers Wells by-election, 14 November 1991
Party	Candidate	Votes	%	±%
Labour	Edward N. Riley	1,591	57.1	
Conservative	Brij M. Gupta	655	23.5	
Liberal Democrats	Rusi K. Dalal	443	15.9	
Green	Jacqueline M. Goodwin	95	3.4	
Turnout			34.4	
Labour hold		Swing		

The by-election was called following the resignation of Cllr Honor Graham.

Argyle by-election, 6 February 1992
Party	Candidate	Votes	%	±%
Conservative	Ian Gibb	1,841	48.6	
Labour Co-op	Anthony Oliver	1,394	36.8	
Liberal Democrats	Helen McKay	515	13.6	
Green	Astra Seibe	40	1.1	
Turnout			42.4	
Conservative hold		Swing		

The by-election was called following the death of Cllr Henry Allen.

Victoria by-election, 1 October 1992
Party	Candidate	Votes	%	±%
Labour	Keith D. M. Fraser	1,070	54.4	
Conservative	Christine R. Magnowska	715	36.3	
Liberal Democrats	Leslie A. Rowe	183	9.3	
Turnout			39.4	
Labour gain from Conservative		Swing		

The by-election was called following the resignation of Cllr Anthony John.

=== 1994–1998 ===
Argyle by-election, 29 September 1994
Party	Candidate	Votes	%	±%
Labour	Neil Richardson	1,330		
Conservative	David Millican	1,229		
Liberal Democrats	John B. Maycock	399		
National Front	Michael C. H. Moore	77		
Turnout				
Labour gain from Conservative		Swing		

The by-election was called following the death of Cllr John Wood.

Northcote by-election, 20 April 1995
Party	Candidate	Votes	%	±%
Labour	Manjit S. Mahal	1,820		
Labour	Gurdip S. Sahota	1,781		
Liberal Democrats	John B. Maycock	753		
Liberal Democrats	John W. Mitchell	757		
Conservative	David S. Gold	744		
Conservative	Michael Pack	702		
Turnout				
Labour hold		Swing		
Labour hold		Swing		

The by-election was called following the death of Cllr Chanan Lachhar and the resignation of Cllr Tara Dyal.

Mount Pleasant by-election, 6 June 1996
Party	Candidate	Votes	%	±%
Labour	Ranjit L. Dheer	1,704	82.6	
Liberal Democrats	Nicola F. Thomson	360	17.4	
Majority		1,344	65.2	
Turnout		2,064	23.0	
Labour hold		Swing		

The by-election was called following the resignation of Cllr Jasbinder Birt.

Vale by-election, 26 September 1996
Party	Candidate	Votes	%	±%
Labour	Joseph Scahill	828	56.8	
Conservative	Mary C. Cook	522	35.8	
Liberal Democrats	Ayjay Gupta	98	6.7	
Majority		306	21.0	
Turnout		1,448	29.8	
Labour hold		Swing		

The by-election was called following the resignation of Cllr Roderick Baptie.

=== 1998–2002 ===
Springfield by-election, 4 June 1998 (3)
Party	Candidate	Votes	%	±%
Labour	John Delaney	1,276		
Labour	Stephen Donnelly	1,254		
Labour	Margaret Payne	1,207		
Conservative	Ellen Delaney	806		
Conservative	Glenn Murphy	770		
Conservative	Mary Macleod	741		
Liberal Democrats	Edward Bailey	254		
Liberal Democrats	Fiona Grabowski	236		
Liberal Democrats	Donal O'Connell	199		
Turnout		6,743	26.6	
Labour hold		Swing		

Mandeville by-election, 30 September 1999
Party	Candidate	Votes	%	±%
Conservative	Glenn M. Murphy	964	54.8	+19.1
Labour	Paul J. Woodgate	685	38.9	−1.8
Liberal Democrats	Francesco Fruzza	110	6.6	+0.6
Majority		279	15.9	
Turnout		1,759	22.5	
Conservative gain from Labour		Swing		

The by-election was called following the resignation of Cllr Brian Reeves.

Walpole by-election, 11 November 1999
Party	Candidate	Votes	%	±%
Labour	Martin R. Beecroft	1,043	52.3	+0.6
Conservative	Daniel Kawczynski	725	36.4	+13.8
Liberal Democrats	John W. Mitchell	123	6.2	−8.1
Socialist Labour	David E. Morgan	57	2.9	+2.9
Independent Green	Astra L. Seibe	45	2.3	−9.1
Majority		318	15.9	
Turnout		1,993	20.0	
Labour hold		Swing		

The by-election was called following the resignation of Cllr Hilary Benn.

Vale by-election, 27 April 2000
Party	Candidate	Votes	%	±%
Labour	Paul J. Woodgate	600	47.5	−10.9
Conservative	Paul Hill	561	44.5	+18.0
Liberal Democrats	Gary Malcolm	101	8.0	−7.1
Majority		39	3.0	
Turnout		1,262	24.4	
Labour hold		Swing		

The by-election was called following the resignation of Cllr Judith Field.

=== 2002–2006 ===
Northolt West End by-election, 5 May 2005
Party	Candidate	Votes	%	±%
Labour	Bassam Mahfouz	2,545	51.6	−8.5
Conservative	Ruth Goldsborough	1,566	31.8	+3.1
Liberal Democrats	Judith E. Ducker	820	16.6	+5.1
Majority		979	19.8	
Turnout		4,931		
Labour hold		Swing		

The by-election was called following the resignation of Cllr Sophie Hosking.

Northolt Mandeville by-election, 30 June 2005
Party	Candidate	Votes	%	±%
Conservative	Eileen Harris	1,017	42.1	−7.4
Labour	Timothy Murtagh	848	35.1	−6.8
Lib Dem Focus Team	Anthony Miller	497	20.6	+12.0
Green	Brian Outten	52	2.2	+2.2
Majority		169	7.0	
Turnout		2,414	25.0	
Conservative hold		Swing		

The by-election was called following the death of Cllr Peter Downham.

=== 2006–2010 ===
Cleveland by-election, 19 July 2007
Party	Candidate	Votes	%	±%
Conservative	Greg Stafford	1,519	43.3	+5.7
Liberal Democrats	Francesco Fruzza	1,288	36.7	+1.5
Labour	Munir Ahmed	539	15.3	−2.9
Green	John Doyle	165	4.7	−4.3
Majority		231	6.6	
Turnout		3,511		
Conservative hold		Swing		

The by-election was called following the death of Cllr Brian Castle.

Greenford Broadway by-election, 1 May 2008
Party	Candidate	Votes	%	±%
Conservative	Maureen Crosby	1,790	43.8	+0.6
Labour	Tim Murtagh	1,770	43.3	−0.5
Liberal Democrats	John B. Maycock	529	12.9	−1.0
Majority		20	0.5	
Turnout		4,089	38.2	
Conservative gain from Labour		Swing		

The by-election was called following the resignation of Cllr Sonika Nirwal.

=== 2010–2014 ===
There were no by-elections.

=== 2014–2018 ===
Northfield by-election 7 May 2015
Party	Candidate	Votes	%	±%
Conservative	Fabio Conti	2,750	39.5	−0.8
Labour	Anita Macdonald	2,630	37.8	+7.0
Green	Bruni de la Motte	751	10.8	−3.8
Liberal Democrats	Joanna Dugdale	570	8.2	+0.1
UKIP	Bob Little	262	3.8	−2.6
Majority		120	1.7	
Turnout				
Conservative hold		Swing		

The by-election was called following the resignation of Cllr Mark Reen.

=== 2018–2022 ===
Dormers Wells by-election 8 November 2018
Party	Candidate	Votes	%	±%
Labour	Mohinda Kaur Midha	1,868	72.1	+2.9
Conservative	Amandeep Singh Gill	429	16.6	+0.8
Liberal Democrats	Nigel Bakhai	188	7.3	+2.7
Green	Meena Hans	106	4.1	−3.2
Majority		1,439	55.5	
Turnout		2,591		
Labour hold		Swing		

The by-election was called following the death of Cllr Tej Bagha.

Ealing Broadway by-election 6 May 2021
Party	Candidate	Votes	%	±%
Conservative	Julian Gallant	2,076	38.0	−2.6
Labour	Claire Tighe	1,601	29.3	−0.6
Liberal Democrats	Christopher Wyatt	977	17.9	+2.7
Green	Meena Hans	716	13.1	−0.1
Workers Party	Daniel Cosby	58	1.1	+1.1
TUSC	Helen Pattison	32	0.6	+0.6
Majority		475	8.7	
Turnout		5,460		
Conservative hold		Swing		

The by-election was called following the resignation of Cllr Alexander Stafford MP.

Hanger Hill by-election 6 May 2021
Party	Candidate	Votes	%	±%
Conservative	Fabio Conti	1,762	35.9	−7.1
Labour	Grace Quansah	1,397	28.5	−1.1
Liberal Democrats	Athena Zissimos	1,100	22.4	+11.2
Green	Kate Crossland	611	12.5	+0.6
TUSC	David Hofman	33	0.7	+0.7
Majority		365	7.4	
Turnout		4,903		
Conservative hold		Swing		

The by-election was called following the resignation of Cllr Joy Morrissey MP.

Hobbayne by-election 6 May 2021
Party	Candidate	Votes	%	±%
Labour	Louise Brett	2,345	48.3	−2.7
Conservative	David Castle	1,477	30.4	+10.6
Green	Emily Grassi	609	12.5	−0.6
Liberal Democrats	Alastair Mitton	366	7.5	+0.7
TUSC	Tony Gill	56	1.2	+1.2
Majority		868	17.9	
Turnout		4,853		
Labour hold		Swing		

The by-election was called following the death of Cllr Anna Tomlinson.

Hobbayne by-election 16 September 2021
Party	Candidate	Votes	%	±%
Labour	Claire Tighe	1,617	52.2	+1.2
Conservative	David Castle	865	27.9	+8.1
Green	Alan Anderson	362	11.7	−0.8
Liberal Democrats	Alastair Mitton	207	6.7	−0.1
TUSC	Tony Gill	48	1.5	+1.5
Majority		752	24.3	
Turnout		3,099		
Labour hold		Swing		

The by-election was called following the resignation of Cllr Lewis Cox.

=== 2022–2026 ===
Hanger Hill by-election 10 October 2024
Party	Candidate	Votes	%	±%
Liberal Democrats	Jonathan Oxley	1,655	52.3	+19.3
Conservative	Sean Hanrahan	814	25.7	−5.3
Labour	Guneet Singh Malik	315	10.0	−13.2
Green	Kate Crossland	245	7.7	−5.1
Reform	Fabio Pukaj	98	3.1	+3.1
Workers Party	Wagdi Thabit	35	1.1	+1.1
Majority		841	26.6	
Turnout		3,162		
Liberal Democrats gain from Conservative		Swing		

The by-election was called following the resignation of Cllr Greg Stafford.

Northolt Mandeville by-election 10 October 2024
Party	Candidate	Votes	%	±%
Labour	Dominic Moffitt	1,126	44.7	−10.3
Conservative	Andrew Bailey	730	29.0	+2.5
Reform	Conrad Lewandowski	271	10.8	+10.8
Green	Natalia Kubica	199	7.9	−3.9
Liberal Democrats	Pedro da Conceicao	114	4.5	−2.2
Workers Party	Elyateb Omima	80	3.2	+3.2
Majority		396	26.6	
Turnout		2,520		
Labour hold		Swing		

The by-election was called following the resignation of Cllr Deirdre Costigan.

South Acton by-election 10 October 2024
Party	Candidate	Votes	%	±%
Labour	Katie Douglas	1,009	48.5	+0.1
Conservative	Kristian Mower	303	14.6	−0.4
Green	Andrew Walkley	287	13.8	−5.5
Liberal Democrats	Timothy Hughes	208	10.0	−1.5
Reform	Marco Manassero	159	7.6	+7.6
Independent	Julie Carter	65	3.1	+3.1
Workers Party	Lucas Herbst	32	1.5	+1.5
TUSC	David Hofman	18	0.9	−1.8
Majority		706	33.9	
Turnout		2,081		
Labour hold		Swing		

The by-election was called following the resignation of Cllr Callum Anderson.

=== 2026–2030 ===
North Acton by-election 25 June 2026
Party	Candidate	Votes	%	±%
Green	Marijn Geer	804	30.2	
Labour	Gareth Shaw	642	24.1	
Liberal Democrats	Abdi Ahmed	523	19.6	
Reform	Jonathan Notley	309	11.6	
Conservative	Sally Gorman	257	9.6	
Ealing Community Independents	Craig Smith	129	4.8	
Majority		162	6.1	
Turnout		2,664		
Green hold		Swing		

The by-election was called following the resignation of Cllr Simon Anthony.
