= North Greenford (ward) =

Electoral ward in London, England

- Electoral ward for the Ealing London Borough Council
- Borough: Ealing
- County: Greater London
- Population: 15,557 (Note: 2021 census data, reported for 2022 ward boundaries)
- Electorate: 11,399 (Note: As of the 2026 local election)
- Major settlements: Greenford, Northolt (small part)
- Area: 3.251 km²

Current electoral ward
- Created: 2002
- Councillors: Flora Macloughlin; Kristian Mower; Ajay Roy
- Created from: Horsenden, Wood End
- GSS code: E05013528

North Greenford is an electoral ward in the London Borough of Ealing. The ward was first used in the 2002 elections and elects three councillors to Ealing London Borough Council.

== Ward profile ==
The ward is the northernmost in the London Borough of Ealing, spanning the length of Whitton Avenue and taking in the northernmost parts of Greenford and Northolt. The area remained largely undeveloped until the early 20th century, and is now characterised by 1920s and 1930s suburban housing. Horsenden Hill, both the highest point in the borough at 84m (276ft) about sea level, as well as its largest nature conservation area at 100 hectares, is in the southeast of the ward. The ward also contains Grove Farm local nature reserve and ancient woodland.

== Political history ==
Between its creation and 2026, North Greenford only elected councillors from the Labour Party, with increasing majorities at each election from 2006 to 2018. The Conservative Party consistently finished second, coming closest to electing a councillor in 2006 when they missed out on the final seat by 77 votes.

In the 2026 election, the ward elected a slate of Conservative councillors for the first time. This coincided with a national swing against Labour, but also with a 6.6% swing against the Conservatives in the London Borough of Ealing, turning North Greenford from a safe Labour ward to the strongest Conservative voting ward in the borough by number of votes.

Its predecessor wards had both been competitive, with Horsenden most recently electing a Conservative councillor in 1994 and Wood End doing so in 1998.

== Councillors ==
Election	Councillors		
2002	Richard Porter (Labour)	Frederick Varley (Labour)	Shital Manro (Labour)
2006	Param Sandhu (Labour)	Patricia Walker (Labour)	Shahbaz Ahmed (Labour)
2010	Theresa Byrne (Labour)	Shital Manro (Labour)	Shahbaz Ahmed (Labour)
2014	Theresa Byrne (Labour)	Shital Manro (Labour)	Patrick Cogan (Labour)
2018	Amarjit Jammu (Labour)	Shital Manro (Labour)	Shahbaz Ahmed (Labour)
2022	Amarjit Jammu (Labour)	Shital Manro (Labour)	Javaid Iqbal (Labour)
2026	Flora Macloughlin (Conservative)	Kristian Mower (Conservative)	Ajay Roy (Conservative)

== Election results ==
=== Elections in the 2020s ===
2026 Ealing London Borough Council election: North Greenford (3 seats)
Party	Candidate	Votes	%	±%
Conservative	Flora Macloughlin	1,925	42.6	+17.3
Conservative	Kristian Mower	1,773	39.3	+16.2
Conservative	Ajay Roy	1,748	38.7	+17.7
Labour	Javaid Iqbal	1,487	32.9	−20.7
Labour	Amarjit Jammu	1,331	29.5	−27.2
Labour	Shital Manro	1,323	29.3	−26.0
Green	Ryan Allain	1,106	24.5	+11.6
Green	Korhan Tunca	874	19.3	+6.4
Reform	Monika Williams	559	12.4	N/A
Reform	Jonathan Notley	554	12.3	N/A
Liberal Democrats	Jim Doona	386	8.5	−3.9
Liberal Democrats	Bex Scott	323	7.2	−4.3
Liberal Democrats	John Gauss	307	6.8	−3.2
Registered electors		11,399		
Turnout		4,517	43.59	+5.18
Conservative gain from Labour		Swing		
Conservative gain from Labour		Swing		
Conservative gain from Labour		Swing		

2022 Ealing London Borough Council election: North Greenford (3)
Party	Candidate	Votes	%	±%
Labour	Amarjit Jammu	2,453	56.7	N/A
Labour	Shital Manro	2,393	55.3	N/A
Labour	Javaid Iqbal	2,319	53.6	N/A
Conservative	George Lafford	1,095	25.3	N/A
Conservative	Predrag Babic	998	23.1	N/A
Conservative	Minoo Sullivan	910	21.0	N/A
Green	Ryan Allain	560	12.9	N/A
Liberal Democrats	Justin Kempley	536	12.4	N/A
Liberal Democrats	Loreta Alac	496	11.5	N/A
Liberal Democrats	Judith Ducker	431	10.0	N/A
Registered electors		11,263		
Turnout		4,326	38.41	−1.21
Labour hold				
Labour hold				
Labour hold				

=== Elections in the 2010s ===
2018 Ealing London Borough Council election: North Greenford (3)
Party	Candidate	Votes	%	±%
Labour	Amarjit Jammu	2,574	60.6	+1.3
Labour	Shahbaz Ahmed	2,571	60.6	+5.3
Labour	Shital Manro	2,529	59.6	+5.0
Conservative	Natalie Stafford	993	23.4	−0.3
Conservative	Frank Kilduff	989	23.3	+2.5
Conservative	Madhava Turumella	866	20.4	+1.7
Green	Adam Floater	378	8.9	N/A
Liberal Democrats	Roger Davies	323	7.6	+1.4
Liberal Democrats	Justin Kempley	304	7.2	+2.3
Liberal Democrats	John Gauss	283	6.7	−0.6
UKIP	Alex Nieora	148	3.5	−11.7
Registered electors		10,714		
Turnout		4,245	39.62	
Labour hold		Swing		
Labour hold		Swing		
Labour hold		Swing		

2014 Ealing London Borough Council election: North Greenford (3)
Party	Candidate	Votes	%	±%
Labour	Theresa Byrne	2,603	59.3	+11.0
Labour	Patrick Cogan	2,424	55.3	+7.6
Labour	Shital Manro	2,393	54.6	+10.5
Conservative	Ida Anderson	1040	23.7	−9.7
Conservative	Gurinderjit Singh Khaira	914	20.8	−11.7
Conservative	Qazal Abbas	821	18.7	−8.4
UKIP	Andrew Gill	668	15.2	N/A
Liberal Democrats	John Gauss	321	7.3	−7.2
Liberal Democrats	Oliver Murphy	273	6.2	−6.3
Liberal Democrats	Alan Whelan	215	4.9	−6.5
Independent	Abdi Alel	210	4.8	N/A
Registered electors		10,683		
Turnout		4386	41.06	
Labour hold		Swing		
Labour hold		Swing		
Labour hold		Swing		

2010 Ealing London Borough Council election: North Greenford (3)
Party	Candidate	Votes	%	±%
Labour	Theresa Byrne	3,112	48.3	
Labour	Shahbaz Ahmed	3,074	47.7	
Labour	Shital Manro	2,843	44.1	
Conservative	Stephen McKenzie	2154	33.4	
Conservative	Frank Kilduff	2097	32.5	
Conservative	Madhava Turumella	1744	27.1	
Liberal Democrats	David Mitchell	935	14.5	
Liberal Democrats	Oliver Murphy	804	12.5	
Liberal Democrats	Norah Grajnert	735	11.4	
Green	John Hotti	425	6.6	
Registered electors		10,263		
Turnout		6446	62.81	
Labour hold		Swing		
Labour hold		Swing		
Labour hold		Swing		

=== Elections in the 2000s ===
2006 Ealing London Borough Council election: North Greenford (3)
Party	Candidate	Votes	%	±%
Labour	Shahbaz Ahmed	1,488	35.8	
Labour	Param Sandhu	1,483		
Labour	Patricia Walker	1,476		
Conservative	Douglas Cecil	1400	33.7	
Conservative	Sarah Probert	1243		
Conservative	John Hotti	1212		
Liberal Democrats	Olive Douglas	706	17.0	
Liberal Democrats	Helen McKay	626		
Independent	Frank Kilduff	561	13.5	
Liberal Democrats	Norah Grajnert	445		
Registered electors		9,914		
Turnout			40.63	
Labour hold		Swing		
Labour hold		Swing		
Labour hold		Swing		

2002 Ealing London Borough Council election: North Greenford (3)
Party	Candidate	Votes	%
Labour	Richard Porter	1,668	
Labour	Frederick Varley	1,654	
Labour	Shital Manro	1,618	
Conservative	David Freeman	906	
Conservative	Brenda Hall	823	
Conservative	Ajay Sandhu	744	
Liberal Democrats	Olive Douglas	415	
Liberal Democrats	Helen McKay	361	
Liberal Democrats	Norah Grajnert	304	
Green	Stella Long	257	
UKIP	David Malindine	140	
Registered electors		9,424	
Turnout			34.15
Labour win (new seat)			
Labour win (new seat)			
Labour win (new seat)			
