= 2014 Ealing London Borough Council election =

2014 local election in England

- 22 May 2014

All 69 seats to Ealing London Borough Council 35 seats needed for a majority

	First party	Second party	Third party
Party	Labour	Conservative	Liberal Democrats
Last election	40 seats	24 seats	5 seats
Seats before	40		5
Seats won	53	12	4
Seat change	▲13	▼12	▼1
Popular vote	149,112	76,158	27,249
Percentage	53.8%	27.5%	9.8%
Council control before election
2010
Labour
Council control after election
2018
Labour

Map of the results of the 2014 Ealing council election. Conservatives in blue, Labour in red and Liberal Democrats in yellow.

The 2014 Ealing Council election took place on 22 May 2014 to elect members of Ealing Council in London. This was on the same day as other local elections. The Labour Party retained overall control of the council, increasing their majority over the Conservative Party by 13 seats.

== Background ==
The last election in 2010 saw Labour winning a majority with 40 seats, compared to 24 for the Conservatives and 5 for the Liberal Democrats. However, in the intervening period between elections, some councillors changed allegiance. The Labour Party was led locally by Julian Bell, a Councillor since 2002, while the Conservative Party was led by David Milican, Councillor from 1990 to 1994 and then from 2006 to 2014 and the Liberal Democrats were led by Gary Malcom, who had been a Councillor since 2002.

== Election result ==
Labour maintained control with an increased majority, winning 53 out of 69 seats on the council. The Conservatives fell to 12 seats, while the Liberal Democrats took the remaining four seats.

Following the result, Conservative leader David Milican resigned, and local leadership was taken up by Gregory Stafford, Councillor since 2007.

== Results ==
Ealing Council election result 2014
Party	Seats	Gains	Losses	Net gain/loss	Seats %	Votes %	Votes	+/−
Labour	53	13	0	+13	76.8	53.8	149,112	
Conservative	12	0	12	-12	17.4	27.5	76,158	
Liberal Democrats	4	0	1	-1	5.8	9.8	27,249	
Green	0	0	0	0	0.0	4.0	11,157	
Independent	0	0	0	0	0.0	2.5	6,878	
UKIP	0	0	0	0	0.0	2.1	5,785	
BNP	0	0	0	0	0.0	0.2	596	
TUSC	0	0	0	0	0.0	0.2	442	

== Wards and results ==
Ward	Labour Seats	Conservative Seats	Liberal Democrat Seats	Change from 2010
Acton Central	3	0	0	No Change
Cleveland	2	1	0	Conservative Loss of 2 seats to Labour
Dormers Wells	3	0	0	No Change
Ealing Broadway	0	3	0	No Change
Ealing Common	0	2	1	No Change
East Acton	3	0	0	No Change
Elthorne	3	0	0	Labour win 2 seats, one each from Conservative and Liberal Democrats
Greenford Broadway	3	0	0	No Change
Greenford Green	3	0	0	Labour win all 3 seats from Conservatives
Hanger Hill	0	3	0	No Change
Hobbayne	3	0	0	Labour gains one seat from Conservatives
Lady Margaret	3	0	0	No Change
North Greenford	3	0	0	No Change
Northfield	0	3	0	No Change
Northolt Mandeville	3	0	0	Labour gains one seat from Conservatives
Northolt West End	3	0	0	No Change
Norwood Green	3	0	0	No Change
Perivale	3	0	0	Labour gains one seat from Conservatives
South Acton	3	0	0	No Change
Southall Broadway	3	0	0	No Change
Southall Green	3	0	0	No Change
Southfield	0	0	3	No Change
Walpole	3	0	0	Labour takes all three seats from Conservatives
Total	53	12	4	

== Detailed results ==
=== Acton Central ===
Acton Central (3)
Party	Candidate	Votes	%	±%
Labour	Daniel Crawford	1,993	50.9	+10.7
Labour	Patricia Walker	1,780	45.4	+10.1
Labour	Abdullah Gulaid	1,758	44.9	+11.6
Conservative	Ross Bogert	1136	29.0	+0.1
Conservative	Vlod Barchuk	1087	27.7	−3.9
Conservative	Maire Lowe	1005	25.7	−1.3
Green	Christina Meiklejohn	590	15.1	+5.1
UKIP	Lewis Loxton	377	9.6	N/A
Liberal Democrats	Margaret Joachim	307	7.8	−13.7
Liberal Democrats	Michael O'Connor	287	7.3	−14.5
Liberal Democrats	Richard Cunningham	282	7.2	−16.5
TUSC	Sharon Dixon	163	4.2	N/A
Turnout		3918	38.26	
Labour hold		Swing		
Labour hold		Swing		
Labour hold		Swing		

=== Cleveland ===
Cleveland (3)
Party	Candidate	Votes	%	±%
Labour	Lynne Murray	1,826	41.3	+14.4
Conservative	Ian Proud	1,766	39.9	−0.3
Labour	David Rodgers	1,641	37.1	+11.4
Labour	Pedro Diogo	1592	36.0	+12.2
Conservative	Vanessa Williams	1578	35.7	−4.4
Conservative	John Salisbury	1530	34.6	−3.3
Green	Freya Summersgill	804	18.2	+9.5
Liberal Democrats	Francesco Fruzza	748	16.9	−14.6
Liberal Democrats	John Maycock	449	10.2	−13.9
Liberal Democrats	Humaira Sanders	422	9.5	−14.1
Turnout		4423	42.29	
Labour gain from Conservative		Swing		
Conservative hold		Swing		
Labour gain from Conservative		Swing		

=== Dormers Wells ===
Dormers Wells (3)
Party	Candidate	Votes	%	±%
Labour	Tejinder Singh Dhami	3,059	74.0	+20.3
Labour	Ranjit Dheer	3,034	73.4	+21.0
Labour	Tej Bagha	3,025	73.2	+20.9
Conservative	Michael Pack	647	15.7	−13.5
Conservative	June Regan	635	15.4	−8.8
Conservative	Charbel Touma	518	12.5	−11.1
Liberal Democrats	Mojgan Ahmad	320	7.7	−6.4
Liberal Democrats	Leslie Glancy	269	6.5	−4.8
Liberal Democrats	Myer Salaman	201	4.9	−4.5
Turnout		4133	41.71	
Labour hold		Swing		
Labour hold		Swing		
Labour hold		Swing		

=== Ealing Broadway ===
Ealing Broadway (3)
Party	Candidate	Votes	%	±%
Conservative	Alexander Stafford	1,872	46.8	−1.2
Conservative	Anthony Young	1,843	46.1	+2.1
Conservative	Seema Kumar	1,614	40.4	−4.8
Labour	Liberty Blacker	1123	28.1	+6.3
Labour	Robert Anderson	1114	27.9	+6.5
Labour	John Culhane	1091	27.3	+4.4
Green	Meena Hans	682	17.1	+4.9
Liberal Democrats	Dorothy Brooks	524	13.1	−15.8
Liberal Democrats	Patrick Salaun	442	11.1	−8.9
UKIP	Jon Carr	394	9.9	N/A
Liberal Democrats	Mark Sanders	391	9.8	−10.3
Turnout		3999	38.49	
Conservative hold		Swing		
Conservative hold		Swing		
Conservative hold		Swing		

=== Ealing Common ===
Ealing Common (3)
Party	Candidate	Votes	%	±%
Conservative	Roz Reece	1,388	33.9	−4.4
Conservative	Joanna Dabrowska	1,357	33.1	−5.8
Liberal Democrats	Jon Ball	1,344	32.8	−9.2
Conservative	David Scott	1231	30.1	−1.1
Liberal Democrats	Jenni Hollis	1144	27.9	−1.5
Labour	Tom Ashwood	1037	25.3	+6.6
Labour	John Metcalfe	958	23.4	+6.6
Liberal Democrats	Craig O'Donnell	927	22.6	−5.6
Labour	Miriam Rice	895	21.9	+5.2
Green	Michael Rosser	557	13.6	+1.1
UKIP	Angela Toy	413	10.1	+5.9
Turnout		4094	40.11	
Conservative hold		Swing		
Conservative hold		Swing		
Liberal Democrats hold		Swing		

=== East Acton ===
East Acton (3)
Party	Candidate	Votes	%	±%
Labour	Kate Crawford	2,346	57.0	+11.5
Labour	Kieron Gavan	1,948	47.4	+9.4
Labour	Hitesh Tailor	1,941	47.2	+8.4
Conservative	Phil Taylor	1086	26.4	−2.9
Conservative	Jim Randall	1055	25.6	−4.3
Conservative	Aleksandra Turner	1006	24.5	−3.5
Green	Bryony Skey	574	14.0	+4.2
UKIP	Tony Judge	341	8.3	N/A
Liberal Democrats	Doreen James	332	8.1	−14.4
Liberal Democrats	Nicholas Winkfield	256	6.2	−13.7
Liberal Democrats	Harvey Rose	246	6.0	−13.6
TUSC	Ravi Patel	143	3.5	N/A
Turnout		4114	32.91	
Labour hold		Swing		
Labour hold		Swing		
Labour hold		Swing		

=== Elthorne ===
Elthorne (3)
Party	Candidate	Votes	%	±%
Labour	Yoel Gordon	2,122	47.1	+11.2
Labour	Joanna Camadoo	1,981	44.0	+14.2
Labour	Peter Mason	1,863	41.4	+12.6
Liberal Democrats	Nigel Bakhai	1155	25.6	−6.1
Conservative	Anita Kapoor	975	21.6	−8.4
Conservative	Fabio Conti	894	19.8	−8.8
Conservative	Ian Potts	886	19.7	−8.7
Liberal Democrats	Joanna Dugdale	613	13.6	−14.2
Green	Suneil Basu	595	13.2	N/A
Green	Christopher Warleigh-Lack	572	12.7	+0.4
Liberal Democrats	Harjinder Singh	426	9.5	−14.5
UKIP	Laura Lyon	416	9.2	N/A
TUSC	Mark Benjamin	136	3.0	N/A
Turnout		4505	41.77	
Labour hold		Swing		
Labour gain from Liberal Democrats		Swing		
Labour gain from Conservative		Swing		

=== Greenford Broadway ===
Greenford Broadway (3)
Party	Candidate	Votes	%	±%
Labour	Julian Bell	2,999	68.6	+17.8
Labour	Harbhajan Kaur Dheer	2,702	61.8	+17.6
Labour	Timothy Murtagh	2,571	58.8	+13.6
Conservative	Peter Edwards	881	20.1	−12.2
Conservative	Lisa Kilduff	871	19.9	−10.5
Conservative	Param Singh Bhatia	867	19.8	−2.6
Independent	Tom Mitchell	353	8.1	+2.8
Liberal Democrats	Donald Allwright	290	6.6	−15.1
Liberal Democrats	Patrick Callaghan	290	6.6	−18.8
Liberal Democrats	Eva Fruzza	250	5.7	−15.4
Turnout		4374	36.45	
Labour hold		Swing		
Labour hold		Swing		
Labour hold		Swing		

=== Greenford Green ===
Greenford Green (3)
Party	Candidate	Votes	%	±%
Labour	Anthony Kelly	2,321	54.6	+18.2
Labour	Aysha Raza	2,097	49.3	+14.5
Labour	Simon Woodroofe	1,953	45.9	+12.4
Conservative	Frank Kilduff	1512	35.5	−7.8
Conservative	Jamila Bibi-Sarwar	1379	32.4	−9.7
Conservative	Edmond Yeo	1349	31.7	−10.1
Green	Rosalie Hans-Barker	431	10.1	+4.2
Liberal Democrats	Andrew Forth	295	6.9	−7.9
Liberal Democrats	Francesco Fruzza	248	5.8	−8.8
Liberal Democrats	Anne Wilson	244	5.7	−8.7
Turnout		4254	40.53	
Labour gain from Conservative		Swing		
Labour gain from Conservative		Swing		
Labour gain from Conservative		Swing		

=== Hanger Hill ===
Hanger Hill (3)
Party	Candidate	Votes	%	±%
Conservative	Joy Morrissey	1,872	50.9	+0.8
Conservative	Nigel Sumner	1,829	49.8	+2.2
Conservative	Greg Stafford	1,801	49.0	−1.0
Labour	Amanda Kent	1134	30.9	+8.5
Labour	Amran Hussain	943	25.7	+6.3
Labour	Paul Woodgate	875	23.8	+3.7
Green	Ruby Visaria	560	15.2	N/A
Liberal Democrats	Cameron Brooks	421	11.5	−14.4
Liberal Democrats	Peter West	412	11.2	−12.2
Liberal Democrats	Tony Miller	411	11.2	−12.0
Turnout		3675	35.91	
Conservative hold		Swing		
Conservative hold		Swing		
Conservative hold		Swing		

=== Hobbayne ===
Hobbayne (3)
Party	Candidate	Votes	%	±%
Labour	Penny Jones	2,854	58.9	+17.8
Labour	Ray Wall	2,790	57.6	+15.0
Labour	Ciaran McCartan	2,707	55.9	+17.2
Conservative	Colm Costello	1533	31.6	−7.4
Conservative	Joseph Gajari	1189	24.5	−7.5
Conservative	Eva Shack	1140	23.5	−6.1
Green	Alan Anderson	716	14.8	+5.3
Liberal Democrats	Zoe Horwich	309	6.4	−12.5
Liberal Democrats	Fenton Willis	256	5.3	−8.4
Liberal Democrats	Lyn Woodcock	164	3.4	−10.0
Turnout		4845	47.38	
Labour hold		Swing		
Labour hold		Swing		
Labour gain from Conservative		Swing		

=== Lady Margaret ===
Lady Margaret (3)
Party	Candidate	Votes	%	±%
Labour	Mohinder Kaur Midha	3,112	67.8	+20.8
Labour	Karam Mohan	3,029	66.0	+18.4
Labour	Swaran Singh Padda	2,956	64.4	+19.3
Conservative	Gurcharan Singh	941	20.5	−14.7
Conservative	Chamkaur Singh Bhathal	913	19.9	−12.7
Conservative	Sarosh Khalil	879	19.2	−8.0
UKIP	Benjamin Royappa	344	7.5	N/A
Green	Sebastian Diamond	289	6.3	N/A
Liberal Democrats	Loreta Alac	222	4.8	−9.4
Liberal Democrats	Rusi Dalal	169	3.7	−7.6
Liberal Democrats	Keshav Sorathia	155	3.4	−8.4
Turnout		4590	43.88	
Labour hold		Swing		
Labour hold		Swing		
Labour hold		Swing		

=== North Greenford ===
North Greenford (3)
Party	Candidate	Votes	%	±%
Labour	Theresa Byrne	2,603	59.3	+11.0
Labour	Patrick Cogan	2,424	55.3	+7.6
Labour	Shital Manro	2,393	54.6	+10.5
Conservative	Ida Anderson	1040	23.7	−9.7
Conservative	Gurinderjit Singh Khaira	914	20.8	−11.7
Conservative	Qazal Abbas	821	18.7	−8.4
UKIP	Andrew Gill	668	15.2	N/A
Liberal Democrats	John Gauss	321	7.3	−7.2
Liberal Democrats	Oliver Murphy	273	6.2	−6.3
Liberal Democrats	Alan Whelan	215	4.9	−6.5
Independent	Abdi Alel	210	4.8	N/A
Turnout		4386	41.06	
Labour hold		Swing		
Labour hold		Swing		
Labour hold		Swing		

=== Northfield ===
Northfield (3)
Party	Candidate	Votes	%	±%
Conservative	David Millican	1,944	44.0	−1.9
Conservative	Theresa Mullins	1,655	37.5	−2.8
Conservative	Mark Reen	1,594	36.1	−5.3
Labour	Anna Tomlinson	1484	33.6	+7.0
Labour	Peter Smith	1449	32.8	+9.1
Labour	Surinder Varma	1220	27.6	+4.2
Green	Nicholas Chapman	703	15.9	+1.4
Green	Bruni De La Motte	615	13.9	N/A
Green	Simon Anthony	582	13.2	N/A
Liberal Democrats	Susan Kendrick	389	8.8	−17.8
Liberal Democrats	Martin Callaghan	384	8.7	−11.9
UKIP	Ray Walsh	305	6.9	N/A
Liberal Democrats	Mike Gettleson	265	6.0	−13.1
Turnout		4414	44.92	
Conservative hold		Swing		
Conservative hold		Swing		
Conservative hold		Swing		

=== Northolt Mandeville ===
Northolt Mandeville (3)
Party	Candidate	Votes	%	±%
Labour	Chris Summers	2,313	52.6	+10.9
Labour	Natasha Ahmed-Shaikh	2,277	51.7	+12.3
Labour	Steve Hynes	2,261	51.4	+13.8
Conservative	Eileen Harris	1158	26.3	−11.5
Conservative	Paramjit Singh Anand	1132	25.7	−12.0
Conservative	Diana Salisbury	1039	23.6	−12.8
UKIP	Bryan Parry	734	16.7	N/A
BNP	David Smith	234	5.3	+0.2
Liberal Democrats	Muhammad Kadhum	223	5.1	−7.3
Liberal Democrats	Gillian Rowley	183	4.2	−7.9
Liberal Democrats	Alan Miller	180	4.1	−10.5
Turnout		4401	41.46	
Labour hold		Swing		
Labour hold		Swing		
Labour gain from Conservative		Swing		

=== Northolt West End ===
Northolt West End (3)
Party	Candidate	Votes	%	±%
Labour	Bassam Mahfouz	2,391	60.7	+13.7
Labour	Dee Martin	2,354	59.8	+10.1
Labour	Lauren Wall	2,299	58.4	+13.7
UKIP	Roy Thomas Schofield	814	20.7	N/A
Conservative	Wojciech Alberti	644	16.4	−12.9
Conservative	Richard Stevens	623	15.8	−13.0
Conservative	Catherine McColgan	599	15.2	−11.9
BNP	David Furness	362	9.2	−0.4
Liberal Democrats	John Seymour	208	5.3	−9.7
Liberal Democrats	Pantea Etessami	160	4.1	−9.2
Liberal Democrats	Henry Gyi	144	3.7	−6.9
Turnout		3936	37.95	
Labour hold		Swing		
Labour hold		Swing		
Labour hold		Swing		

=== Norwood Green ===
Norwood Green (3)
Party	Candidate	Votes	%	±%
Labour	Gurmit Kaur Mann	2,714	69.5	+20.9
Labour	Rajinder Singh Mann	2,680	68.6	+21.2
Labour	Mohammad Aslam	2,598	66.5	+19.5
Conservative	Neena Kapoor	748	19.2	−9.6
Conservative	George Lafford	710	18.2	−9.3
Conservative	Edna Stockton	597	15.3	−11.5
Green	Alexander Warleigh-Lack	263	6.7	−0.4
Liberal Democrats	Margaret Sharma	177	4.5	−10.4
Liberal Democrats	Heather Matthews	164	4.2	−9.0
Independent	Joe Prospero	146	3.7	N/A
Liberal Democrats	David Zerdin	110	2.8	−9.8
Turnout		3905	40.05	
Labour hold		Swing		
Labour hold		Swing		
Labour hold		Swing		

=== Perivale ===
Perivale (3)
Party	Candidate	Votes	%	±%
Labour	Munir Ahmed	2,524	51.5	+8.7
Labour	Charan Sharma	2,352	48.0	+6.2
Labour	Tariq Mahmood	2,325	47.4	+5.9
Conservative	Justin Anderson	1458	29.7	−12.9
Independent	Alex Nieora	1165	23.8	N/A
Conservative	Mounira Assoul	1056	21.5	−17.8
Conservative	Madhava Turumella	810	16.5	−21.3
Green	Rose-Anna Bleasdale	507	10.3	N/A
Liberal Democrats	Robert Browning	278	5.7	−11.2
Liberal Democrats	Roger Davies	251	5.1	−10.6
Liberal Democrats	Margaret Horwich	234	4.8	−10.1
Turnout		4905	43.56	
Labour hold		Swing		
Labour gain from Conservative		Swing		
Labour hold		Swing		

=== South Acton ===
South Acton (3)
Party	Candidate	Votes	%	±%
Labour	Yvonne Johnson	1,957	49.8	+8.8
Labour	Josh Blacker	1,897	48.3	+6.1
Labour	Mik Sabiers	1,660	42.2	+6.2
Conservative	Amanda Cadogan	1183	30.1	−2.5
Conservative	Julian Gallant	1147	29.2	−1.8
Conservative	Sara Kumar	936	23.8	−2.6
Green	David Northcott	588	15.0	+3.0
UKIP	Bob Little	342	8.7	N/A
Liberal Democrats	Tom Parkinson	336	8.5	−18.4
Liberal Democrats	Shao-Ying Ben-Nathan	335	8.5	−11.5
Liberal Democrats	John-Paul Vivian	225	5.7	−2.6
Independent	Dan Meskell	221	5.6	N/A
Turnout		3931	38.53	
Labour hold		Swing		
Labour hold		Swing		
Labour hold		Swing		

=== Southall Broadway ===
Southall Broadway (3)
Party	Candidate	Votes	%	±%
Labour	Kamaljit Kaur Nagpal	3,255	60.0	+1.8
Labour	Sarfraz Khan	3,236	59.7	+3.8
Labour	Sanja Kohli	3,205	59.1	+4.3
Independent	Zahida Noori	1654	30.5	−27.7
Independent	Gurmail Singh Dokal	1486	27.4	N/A
Independent	Manjit Singh	1406	25.9	−2.4
Conservative	Janet Lilly	298	5.5	−23.0
Conservative	Dawn Larmouth	290	5.3	−23.0
Conservative	Joseph Touma	238	4.4	−19.6
Independent	Darshan Singh Bhinder	237	4.4	N/A
Liberal Democrats	Gurpal Singh Kular	175	3.2	−3.8
Liberal Democrats	Nigel Bliss	123	2.3	−3.7
Liberal Democrats	Inge Veecock	87	1.6	−3.1
Turnout		5422	52.54	
Labour hold		Swing		
Labour hold		Swing		
Labour hold		Swing		

=== Southall Green ===
Southall Green (3)
Party	Candidate	Votes	%	±%
Labour	Jasbir Kaur Anand	4,088	83.8	+24.9
Labour	Kamaljit Singh Dhindsa	3,970	81.4	+25.0
Labour	Swarn Singh Kang	3,909	80.1	+24.4
Conservative	Avtar Chand	549	11.3	−15.9
Conservative	Inderjit Anand	481	9.9	−16.9
Conservative	Hazel Ware	415	8.5	−17.5
Liberal Democrats	Pat Mellor	216	4.4	−3.8
Liberal Democrats	Peter Paterson	175	3.6	−6.4
Liberal Democrats	Gary Purkiss	152	3.1	−4.6
Turnout		4879	44.84	
Labour hold		Swing		
Labour hold		Swing		
Labour hold		Swing		

=== Southfield ===
Southfield (3)
Party	Candidate	Votes	%	±%
Liberal Democrats	Gary Busuttil	1,713	40.5	−4.9
Liberal Democrats	Gary Malcolm	1,712	40.5	−3.0
Liberal Democrats	Andrew Steed	1,555	36.8	−2.2
Conservative	Patrick Barr	1430	33.8	−1.5
Conservative	Janet Young	1161	27.4	−5.7
Conservative	Nick Sabin	1106	26.1	−5.0
Labour	Colin Bastin	863	20.4	+4.0
Labour	Vanessa Beadsworth	813	19.2	+4.4
Labour	Stephen Donnelly	655	15.5	+1.8
Green	Michael Landon	637	15.1	+7.9
UKIP	Dennis Duff	307	7.3	+4.5
Turnout		4231	42.25	
Liberal Democrats hold		Swing		
Liberal Democrats hold		Swing		
Liberal Democrats hold		Swing		

=== Walpole ===
Walpole (3)
Party	Candidate	Votes	%	±%
Labour	Paul Conlan	1,986	44.9	+15.3
Labour	Gareth Shaw	1,942	43.9	+17.5
Labour	Binda Rai	1,845	41.7	+17.2
Conservative	Ann Chapman	1672	37.8	−2.8
Conservative	John Cowing	1407	31.8	−3.0
Conservative	Ashok Kapoor	1238	28.0	−2.4
Green	Ryan Allain	892	20.2	+8.3
Liberal Democrats	John Mitchell	416	9.4	−12.1
Liberal Democrats	Catherine Royce	360	8.1	−12.7
UKIP	Alan Jones	330	7.5	N/A
Liberal Democrats	Adam Sanyo	289	6.5	−13.9
Turnout		4426	44.91	
Labour gain from Conservative		Swing		
Labour gain from Conservative		Swing		
Labour gain from Conservative		Swing		
