= 1964 Ealing London Borough Council election =

1964 local election in England

7 May 1964	1968 →

All 60 seats to Ealing London Borough Council 31 seats needed for a majority

	First party	Second party
Party	Labour	Conservative
Seats won	34	26
Council control after election
1968
Labour

The 1964 Ealing Council election took place on 7 May 1964 to elect members of Ealing London Borough Council in London, England. The whole council was up for election and the Labour Party gained control of the council.

== Background ==
These elections were the first to the newly formed borough. Previously elections had taken place in the Municipal Borough of Acton, Municipal Borough of Ealing and Municipal Borough of Southall. These boroughs were joined to form the new London Borough of Ealing by the London Government Act 1963.

A total of 177 candidates stood in the election for the 60 seats being contested across 20 wards. These included a full slate from the Conservative and Labour parties, while the Liberals stood 42 candidates. Other candidates included 8 from the Communist party, 6 from the British National party and 1 Independent. All wards were three-seat wards.

This election had aldermen as well as directly elected councillors. Labour got all 10 aldermen.

The Council was elected in 1964 as a "shadow authority" but did not start operations until 1 April 1965.

== Election result ==
The results saw Labour gain the new council with a majority of 8 after winning 34 of the 60 seats. Overall turnout in the election was 45.1%. This turnout included 1,350 postal votes.

== Ward results ==
Brent (3)
Party	Candidate	Votes	%	±%
Labour	W. J. Gooderham	2,795		
Labour	R. J. Westmorland	2,731		
Labour	S. J. Rapley	2,729		
Conservative	M. P. Kennedy	1,673		
Conservative	J. P. England	1,638		
Conservative	R. K. Holme	1,629		
Turnout		4,481	46.1	
Labour win (new seat)				
Labour win (new seat)				
Labour win (new seat)				

Central (3)
Party	Candidate	Votes	%	±%
Conservative	F. E. Tann	3,035		
Conservative	G. W. Summers	3,023		
Conservative	Mrs. B. Howard	3,006		
Labour	F. W. Gowing	1,842		
Labour	Mrs. P. Klombies	1,822		
Labour	C. Wild	1,806		
Liberal	M. Venner	687		
Liberal	Miss D. Smith	675		
Liberal	Mrs. E. Lewisohn	667		
Turnout		5,611	43.4	
Conservative win (new seat)				
Conservative win (new seat)				
Conservative win (new seat)				

Cleveland (3)
Party	Candidate	Votes	%	±%
Conservative	Mrs. M. Austin	3,420		
Conservative	P. B. Burke	3,416		
Conservative	J. I. Wood	3,327		
Labour	Mrs. M. Lorde	1,146		
Labour	P. A. Kenny	1,101		
Labour	S. Tibbles	1,089		
Liberal	G. F. Bilson	615		
Liberal	R. H. Coffin	583		
Liberal	Miss A. Mannin	577		
Turnout		5,143	43.7	
Conservative win (new seat)				
Conservative win (new seat)				
Conservative win (new seat)				

Dormers Wells (3)
Party	Candidate	Votes	%	±%
Conservative	F. G. Errington	2,061		
Conservative	T. J. A. Aspell	2,031		
Conservative	F. R. J. Rockhill	1,936		
Labour	F. R. Day	1,545		
Labour	C. Henderson	1,497		
Labour	J. Johnston	1,121		
BNP	H. W. Johnson	749		
BNP	G. H. Howe	371		
Turnout		3,910	42.8	
Conservative win (new seat)				
Conservative win (new seat)				
Conservative win (new seat)				

East (3)
Party	Candidate	Votes	%	±%
Labour	J. T. Ledwith	2,459		
Labour	A. J. McCallum	2,453		
Labour	S. A. Goodman	2,448		
Conservative	M. Hogan	1,417		
Conservative	M. A. Benkert	1,407		
Conservative	H. Wicks	1,400		
Liberal	M. R. Brooks	206		
Liberal	M. Barron	196		
Liberal	D. J. Gell	189		
Communist	M. Mitchell	147		
Turnout		4,171	42.7	
Labour win (new seat)				
Labour win (new seat)				
Labour win (new seat)				

Elthorne (3)
Party	Candidate	Votes	%	±%
Labour	R. A. Eggleton	2,676		
Labour	W. H. Reynolds	2,501		
Labour	A. K. Schollar	2,450		
Conservative	K. G. Reeves	1,930		
Conservative	E. R. Bennett	1,923		
Conservative	C. H. Fuell	1,915		
Liberal	Miss J. Tilley	193		
Liberal	Mrs. M. Lillia	174		
Liberal	Mrs. B. Vanstone	149		
Communist	J. E. Hannan	103		
Turnout		4,795	48.1	
Labour win (new seat)				
Labour win (new seat)				
Labour win (new seat)				

Glebe (3)
Party	Candidate	Votes	%	±%
Labour	W. G. Lamb	1,598		
Labour	W. H. Hopkins	1,571		
Labour	P. G. Southey	1,543		
Conservative	F. B. Green	921		
Conservative	F. J. Allaway	906		
Conservative	Mrs. D. Radford	864		
BNP	J. E. Gale	459		
BNP	B. F. Rogers	455		
Communist	L. Miller	129		
Turnout		2,919	30.8	
Labour win (new seat)				
Labour win (new seat)				
Labour win (new seat)				

Hanger Hill (3)
Party	Candidate	Votes	%	±%
Conservative	C. C. Headley	2,563		
Conservative	Mrs. E. M. Stephens	2,527		
Conservative	C. T. Long	2,526		
Labour	W. A. Durran	1,634		
Labour	E. J. Nickson	1,600		
Labour	Miss B. Youngday	1,600		
Liberal	M. T. Redfern	237		
Liberal	Mrs. E. Risdon	221		
Turnout		4,280	45.6	
Conservative win (new seat)				
Conservative win (new seat)				
Conservative win (new seat)				

Heathfield (3)
Party	Candidate	Votes	%	±%
Labour	T. W. Newson	2,522		
Labour	A. C. Vinson	2,479		
Labour	Miss A. Saunders	2,453		
Conservative	J. T. Hancock	1,793		
Conservative	A. J. D. Hornblow	1,768		
Conservative	A. W. J. Brewer	1,768		
Liberal	H. C. N. Baylis	297		
Communist	T. J. Trott	150		
Turnout		4,582	42.0	
Labour win (new seat)				
Labour win (new seat)				
Labour win (new seat)				

Horsenden (3)
Party	Candidate	Votes	%	±%
Conservative	A. W. Moreby	2,744		
Conservative	H. R. Hayselden	2,704		
Conservative	G. W. Hill	2,695		
Labour	Mrs. A. Murray	2,584		
Labour	W. A. Whitbread	2,513		
Labour	A. J. Chilton	2,466		
Liberal	F. G. Grainger	519		
Liberal	E. V. Lawrence	510		
Liberal	A. B. Da Costa	483		
Communist	R. A. Avery	91		
Turnout		5,843	55.5	
Conservative win (new seat)				
Conservative win (new seat)				
Conservative win (new seat)				

Mandeville (3)
Party	Candidate	Votes	%	±%
Labour	E. C. Noyes	2,657		
Labour	Mrs. N. Law	2,653		
Labour	F. J. Little	2,621		
Conservative	G. F. Taylor	1,290		
Conservative	B. R. Chapman	1,277		
Conservative	W. E. Taylor	1,272		
Liberal	J. H. Hall	272		
Liberal	E. A. Bryant	268		
Liberal	E. H. Jackson	255		
Turnout		4,248	48.1	
Labour win (new seat)				
Labour win (new seat)				
Labour win (new seat)				

Northcote (3)
Party	Candidate	Votes	%	±%
Labour	J. Haigh	1,808		
Labour	A. J. Barton	1,768		
Labour	T. J. Steele	1,558		
Conservative	J. T. A. Moore	928		
Conservative	G. F. Lockyer	884		
Conservative	R. J. Willis	870		
BNP	R. A. Cuddon	633		
BNP	A. J. Mogg	588		
Communist	Miss R. Lowe	372		
Independent	J. McConville	362		
Turnout		3,561	31.2	
Labour win (new seat)				
Labour win (new seat)				
Labour win (new seat)				

Northfields (3)
Party	Candidate	Votes	%	±%
Conservative	F. Bavister	2,632		
Conservative	E. H. Crook	2,619		
Labour	T. J. Allsop	2,611		
Labour	C. Gardner	2,548		
Conservative	P. W. Parke	2,528		
Labour	G. W. Reynolds	2,465		
Liberal	A. H. Thrower	537		
Liberal	J. E. Elsom	519		
Liberal	A. J. Thomas	502		
Turnout		5,756	52.6	
Conservative win (new seat)				
Conservative win (new seat)				
Labour win (new seat)				

Perivale (3)
Party	Candidate	Votes	%	±%
Conservative	Miss R. Harrison	2,995		
Conservative	Mrs. E. Prodham	2,952		
Conservative	P. L. Rayner	2,945		
Labour	Mrs. D. Bennett	2,473		
Labour	F. E. Duce	2,468		
Labour	Mrs. M. T. Elliott	2,417		
Liberal	J. A. Sullivan	776		
Liberal	L. Baker	764		
Liberal	Mrs. A. Redfern	702		
Turnout		6,226	52.9	
Conservative win (new seat)				
Conservative win (new seat)				
Conservative win (new seat)				

Ravenor (3)
Party	Candidate	Votes	%	±%
Labour	D. J. Cousins	2,933		
Labour	M. N. Elliott	2,912		
Labour	R. J. Welch	2,810		
Conservative	W. F. Dawson	2,355		
Conservative	A. C. Ebsworth	2,340		
Conservative	G. S. Edwards	2,339		
Liberal	S. E. Smith	590		
Liberal	B. T. Goodall	563		
Liberal	W. H. Parkinson	524		
Communist	M. J. Hicks	147		
Turnout		5,933	52.0	
Labour win (new seat)				
Labour win (new seat)				
Labour win (new seat)				

Southfield (3)
Party	Candidate	Votes	%	±%
Labour	E. W. J. Everett	2,987		
Labour	G. W. Mason	2,952		
Labour	J. G. Telfer	2,945		
Conservative	C. G. Codd	2,041		
Conservative	D. K. Traynor	2,036		
Conservative	M. S. Woodrow	1,979		
Liberal	P. R. Webber	466		
Turnout		5,329	49.3	
Labour win (new seat)				
Labour win (new seat)				
Labour win (new seat)				

Springfield (3)
Party	Candidate	Votes	%	±%
Conservative	A. H. Fuller	2,740		
Conservative	R. C. Politeyan	2,692		
Conservative	W. G. Hill	2,655		
Labour	J. H. High	2,279		
Labour	G. E. O. Thomas	2,246		
Labour	F. Gommersall	2,184		
Liberal	E. M. Ginger	333		
Liberal	S. Rosenberg	254		
Turnout		5,251	47.9	
Conservative win (new seat)				
Conservative win (new seat)				
Conservative win (new seat)				

Walpole (3)
Party	Candidate	Votes	%	±%
Conservative	R. Hetherington	2,386		
Conservative	R. R. Clay	2,242		
Conservative	W. J. Mason	2,187		
Labour	T. Searle	1,787		
Labour	J. Sherman	1,774		
Labour	A. H. Martin	1,759		
Liberal	H. J. Gibbs	543		
Liberal	T. F. Spaul	482		
Liberal	G. R. Walker	454		
Turnout		4,644	42.0	
Conservative win (new seat)				
Conservative win (new seat)				
Conservative win (new seat)				

Waxlow Manor (3)
Party	Candidate	Votes	%	±%
Labour	J. F. Barlow	2,581		
Labour	E. J. Sheil	2,532		
Labour	A. T. Dane	2,516		
Conservative	J. W. Haines	1,364		
Conservative	J. H. Blumire	1,347		
Conservative	Mrs. J. Phippen	1,346		
Liberal	B. W. Bugden	395		
Liberal	P. Gelbert	361		
Liberal	H. A. Slade	352		
Turnout		4,360	41.6	
Labour win (new seat)				
Labour win (new seat)				
Labour win (new seat)				

West End (3)
Party	Candidate	Votes	%	±%
Labour	K. H. Acock	1,877		
Labour	E. J. Jones	1,853		
Labour	A. W. Surry	1,789		
Conservative	I. McCulloch	558		
Conservative	P. M. Thomas	550		
Conservative	S. P. Brindley	547		
Liberal	M. J. Davenport	140		
Liberal	D. O. Knowlden	125		
Liberal	R. Staniland	120		
Communist	H. B. Sewell	68		
Turnout		2,586	39.5	
Labour win (new seat)				
Labour win (new seat)				
Labour win (new seat)				
