= 1982 Ealing London Borough Council election =

1982 local election in England

← 1978	6 May 1982	1986 →

All 69 seats to Ealing London Borough Council 35 seats needed for a majority

	First party	Second party	Third party
Party	Conservative	Labour	Liberal
Last election	41 seats	28 seats	0 seats
Seats before	41	28	0
Seats won	37	30	3
Seat change	▼4	▲2	▲3
Council control before election
1978
Conservative
Council control after election
1986
Conservative

The 1982 Ealing Council election took place on 6 May 1982 to elect members of Ealing London Borough Council in London, England. The whole council was up for election and the Conservative party stayed in overall control of the council.

== Ward results ==
Argyle (3)
Party	Candidate	Votes	%	±%
Conservative	John Wood	2,297	53.1	
Conservative	Joan Ansell	2,269		
Conservative	Beatrice Howard	2,266		
Alliance		1,045	24.1	
Alliance		1,036		
Alliance		1,018		
Labour		1,018	22.8	
Labour		962		
Labour		955		

Costons (3)
Party	Candidate	Votes	%	±%
Conservative	Richard Bellairs	1,870	48.0	
Conservative	John Green	1,819		
Conservative	Alexander Thom	1,767		
Labour		1,226	31.2	
Labour		1,191		
Labour		1,136		
Alliance		816	20.8	
Alliance		776		
Alliance		772		

Dormers Wells (3)
Party	Candidate	Votes	%	±%
Labour	Frederick Hopkins	1,472	43.3	
Labour	Virendra Sharma	1,425		
Labour	Ranjit Dheer	1,338		
Conservative		1,254	36.2	
Conservative		1,164		
Conservative		1,122		
Alliance		755	20.5	
Alliance		687		
Alliance		564		

Ealing Common (3)
Party	Candidate	Votes	%	±%
Conservative	Kenneth Kettle	2,252	52.8	
Conservative	Francis Stowell	2,159		
Conservative	June Shipton	2,148		
Alliance		1,127	26.5	
Alliance		1,091		
Alliance		1,071		
Labour		904	20.8	
Labour		849		
Labour		833		

Elthorne (3)
Party	Candidate	Votes	%	±%
Labour	Gwendolen Barnes	1,678	42.0	
Labour	Steven Pound	1,595		
Labour	Dr. Margaret Najumdar	1,498		
Conservative		1,466	38.3	
Conservative		1.452		
Conservative		1,442		
Alliance		774	19.7	
Alliance		736		
Alliance		728		

Glebe (3)
Party	Candidate	Votes	%	±%

Hanger Lane (3)
Party	Candidate	Votes	%	±%
Conservative	William Hammett	2,940	68.9	
Conservative	Norman Pointing	2.882		
Conservative	Ian Potts	2.811		
Alliance		855	19.4	
Alliance		819		
Alliance		757		
Labour		508	11.7	
Labour		493		
Labour		468		

Heathfield (3)
Party	Candidate	Votes	%	±%

Hobbayne (3)
Party	Candidate	Votes	%	±%

Mandeville (3)
Party	Candidate	Votes	%	±%

Mount Pleasant (3)
Party	Candidate	Votes	%	±%

Northcote (3)
Party	Candidate	Votes	%	±%

Northfield (3)
Party	Candidate	Votes	%	±%

Perivale (3)
Party	Candidate	Votes	%	±%

Pitshanger (3)
Party	Candidate	Votes	%	±%

Ravenor (3)
Party	Candidate	Votes	%	±%

Southfield (3)
Party	Candidate	Votes	%	±%

Springfield (3)
Party	Candidate	Votes	%	±%

Vale (2)
Party	Candidate	Votes	%	±%

Victoria (2)
Party	Candidate	Votes	%	±%

Walpole (3)
Party	Candidate	Votes	%	±%

Waxlow (3)
Party	Candidate	Votes	%	±%

West End (3)
Party	Candidate	Votes	%	±%

Wood End (3)
Party	Candidate	Votes	%	±%
