= 2006 Ealing London Borough Council election =

Ealing Council local elections

2006 Ealing Council election
- 4 May 2006

All 69 seats to Ealing London Borough Council 35 seats needed for a majority
| | First party | Second party | Third party |
|---|---|---|---|
| Party | Conservative | Labour | Liberal Democrats |
| Seats won | 37 | 29 | 3 |
| Seat change | ▲20 | ▼19 | ▼1 |
| Popular vote | 32,370 | 28,240 | 16,689 |
| Percentage | 37.8% | 33.0% | 19.5% |
| Swing | ▲8.4% | ▼11.8% | ▲3.3% |
- Map of the results of the 2006 Ealing council election. Conservatives in blue,Labour in red and Liberal Democrats in yellow.
Council control before election
Labour
Council control after election
Conservative

Elections for Ealing Council in London were held on 4 May 2006. The 2006 United Kingdom local elections took place on the same day.

The Conservatives gained control of the borough from the Labour Party, who themselves had been in control since 1994. The Conservatives had campaigned on opposition to the proposed West London Tram, and this opposition was claimed to be a factor in the outcome, though Labour had incurred losses much further afield and the proposed tram would have run the length of the Uxbridge Road which only passed through about half of the borough's wards.

Turnout was 37.69%.

== Results summary ==
Out of a total of 69 seats, the Conservative party got elected in 37, whilst Labour candidates were elected in 27 seats. The Liberal Democrats were elected in 3 seats.

Ealing local election result 2006
| Party | Seats | Gains | Losses | Net gain/loss | Seats % | Votes % | Votes | +/− |
|---|---|---|---|---|---|---|---|---|
| Conservative | 37 | 20 | 0 | ▲20 | 53.6 | 37.8 | 32,370 | ▲8.4 |
| Labour | 29 | 0 | 19 | ▼19 | 42.0 | 33.0 | 28,240 | ▼11.8 |
| Liberal Democrats | 3 | 0 | 1 | ▼1 | 4.3 | 19.5 | 16,689 | ▲3.3 |
| Green | 0 | 0 | 0 | Steady | 0.0 | 7.1 | 6,034 | ▼0.2 |
| Independent | 0 | 0 | 0 | Steady | 0.0 | 1.3 | 1,078 | ▲1.0 |
| Respect | 0 | 0 | 0 | Steady | 0.0 | 0.9 | 763 | New |
| CPA | 0 | 0 | 0 | Steady | 0.0 | 0.4 | 305 | New |
| UKIP | 0 | 0 | 0 | Steady | 0.0 | 0.1 | 104 | ▼0.4 |

== Ward results ==
=== Acton Central ===
Acton Central (3)
| Party | Candidate | Votes | % | ±% |
|---|---|---|---|---|
| Conservative | Marie-Christine Randall | 1,284 | 34.3 | |
| Conservative | Wolodymyr Barczuk | 1,228 | | |
| Conservative | Seema Kumar | 1,091 | | |
| Labour | Theresa Byrne | 1016 | 27.2 | |
| Labour | John Delaney | 1005 | | |
| Labour | Laurence Evans | 871 | | |
| Liberal Democrats | Margaret Joachim | 570 | 15.2 | |
| Liberal Democrats | Michael O'Connor | 569 | | |
| Liberal Democrats | Richard Cunningham | 523 | | |
| Green | Christina Meiklejohn | 423 | 11.3 | |
| Independent | Kenneth White | 332 | 8.9 | |
| CPA | Sonia Gyawu-Kyem | 116 | 3.1 | |
| Turnout | | | 34.7 | |
| Conservative gain from Labour | | Swing | | |
| Conservative gain from Labour | | Swing | | |
| Conservative gain from Labour | | Swing | | |

=== Cleveland ===
Cleveland (3)
| Party | Candidate | Votes | % | ±% |
|---|---|---|---|---|
| Conservative | Ian Gibb | 1,854 | 37.6 | |
| Conservative | Brian Castle | 1,846 | | |
| Conservative | John Popham | 1,823 | | |
| Liberal Democrats | Francesco Fruzza | 1735 | 35.2 | |
| Liberal Democrats | Gary Purkiss | 1514 | | |
| Liberal Democrats | Simon Rowley | 1513 | | |
| Labour | Hermia Bell | 896 | 18.2 | |
| Labour | Munir Ahmed | 845 | | |
| Labour | Omer Ahmed | 761 | | |
| Green | Astra Seibe | 446 | 9.0 | |
| Turnout | | | 46.6 | |
| Conservative hold | | Swing | | |
| Conservative hold | | Swing | | |
| Conservative hold | | Swing | | |

=== Dormers Wells ===
Dormers Wells (3)
| Party | Candidate | Votes | % | ±% |
|---|---|---|---|---|
| Labour | Tejinder Singh Dhami | 1,703 | 62.9 | |
| Labour | Ranjit Dheer | 1,661 | | |
| Labour | Tej Bagha | 1,657 | | |
| Conservative | Mark Nicholson | 580 | 21.4 | |
| Conservative | Abdullahi Osman | 551 | | |
| Conservative | Anthony Nolder | 524 | | |
| Liberal Democrats | Rita Mould | 424 | 15.7 | |
| Liberal Democrats | Sidney Mould | 401 | | |
| Liberal Democrats | Toran Shaw | 336 | | |
| Turnout | | | 34.7 | |
| Labour hold | | Swing | | |
| Labour hold | | Swing | | |
| Labour hold | | Swing | | |

=== Ealing Broadway ===
Ealing Broadway (3)
| Party | Candidate | Votes | % | ±% |
|---|---|---|---|---|
| Conservative | Ian Potts | 2,119 | 54.1 | |
| Conservative | Anthony Young | 1,847 | | |
| Conservative | David Scott | 1,839 | | |
| Liberal Democrats | Francis Salaun | 673 | 17.2 | |
| Liberal Democrats | Doreen Zerdin | 576 | | |
| Labour | Andrew Hammond | 566 | 14.4 | |
| Green | Linda Burke | 559 | 14.3 | |
| Liberal Democrats | David Zerdin | 558 | | |
| Labour | Sheila Hurley | 551 | | |
| Labour | Dilmohan Singh Bhasin | 480 | | |
| Turnout | | | 35.7 | |
| Conservative hold | | Swing | | |
| Conservative hold | | Swing | | |
| Conservative hold | | Swing | | |

=== Ealing Common ===
Ealing Common (3)
| Party | Candidate | Votes | % | ±% |
|---|---|---|---|---|
| Conservative | Ian Green | 1,736 | 40.4 | |
| Liberal Democrats | Jon Ball | 1,611 | 37.5 | |
| Conservative | Joanna Dabrowska | 1,586 | | |
| Conservative | Paul Hill | 1572 | | |
| Liberal Democrats | Nigel Bakhai | 1393 | | |
| Liberal Democrats | Edward Coleman | 1381 | | |
| Green | Peter Burton | 512 | 11.9 | |
| Labour | Kevin McGrath | 433 | 10.1 | |
| Labour | Joseph Goldberg | 412 | | |
| Labour | Paul Woodgate | 341 | | |
| Turnout | | | 39.9 | |
| Conservative hold | | Swing | | |
| Liberal Democrats hold | | Swing | | |
| Conservative hold | | Swing | | |

=== East Acton ===
East Acton (3)
| Party | Candidate | Votes | % | ±% |
|---|---|---|---|---|
| Conservative | Jim Randall | 1,297 | 42.8 | |
| Conservative | John Ross | 1,213 | | |
| Labour | Kate Crawford | 1,210 | 39.9 | |
| Conservative | Jill Stern | 1167 | | |
| Labour | Philip Portwood | 1155 | | |
| Labour | Atallah Said | 1083 | | |
| Liberal Democrats | Donald Allwright | 525 | 17.3 | |
| Liberal Democrats | Fiona Grabowski | 482 | | |
| Liberal Democrats | William Martin | 419 | | |
| Turnout | | | 32.6 | |
| Conservative gain from Labour | | Swing | | |
| Conservative gain from Labour | | Swing | | |
| Labour hold | | Swing | | |

=== Elthorne ===
Elthorne (3)
| Party | Candidate | Votes | % | ±% |
|---|---|---|---|---|
| Conservative | Jonathan Oxley | 1,068 | 29.3 | |
| Labour | Julia Clements-Elliott | 988 | 27.1 | |
| Conservative | Amit Kapoor | 987 | | |
| Labour | Christopher Payne | 943 | | |
| Conservative | Arundeep Sandhu | 927 | | |
| Liberal Democrats | Peter Hutchison | 919 | 25.2 | |
| Labour | Manmohan Sondh | 832 | | |
| Liberal Democrats | Alan Whelan | 791 | | |
| Green | Suneil Basu | 672 | 18.4 | |
| Liberal Democrats | David Randles | 670 | | |
| Turnout | | | 34.6 | |
| Conservative gain from Labour | | Swing | | |
| Labour hold | | Swing | | |
| Conservative gain from Labour | | Swing | | |

=== Greenford Broadway ===
Greenford Broadway (3)
| Party | Candidate | Votes | % | ±% |
|---|---|---|---|---|
| Labour | Julian Bell | 1,468 | 43.8 | |
| Conservative | Justin Anderson | 1,414 | 42.2 | |
| Labour | Sonika Nirwal | 1,408 | | |
| Conservative | Maureen Crosby | 1,400 | | |
| Labour | Leonora Thomson | 1,351 | | |
| Conservative | Rita Osborne | 1,330 | | |
| Liberal Democrats | Roger Davies | 466 | 13.9 | |
| Liberal Democrats | David Mitchell | 417 | | |
| Liberal Democrats | Gillian Rowley | 400 | | |
| Turnout | | | 35.8 | |
| Labour hold | | Swing | | |
| Conservative gain from Labour | | Swing | | |
| Labour hold | | Swing | | |

=== Greenford Green ===
Greenford Green (3)
| Party | Candidate | Votes | % | ±% |
|---|---|---|---|---|
| Conservative | William Brooks | 1,859 | 50.2 | |
| Conservative | Susan Emment | 1,825 | | |
| Conservative | Jason Stacey | 1,775 | | |
| Labour | Vina Sharma | 1,220 | 32.9 | |
| Labour | Sneh Bhanot | 1,181 | | |
| Labour | Wiktor Moszczynski | 1,144 | | |
| Liberal Democrats | Anastasia McCreadie | 440 | 11.9 | |
| Liberal Democrats | Raymond Alcock | 437 | | |
| Liberal Democrats | Patricia Palmer | 395 | | |
| Independent | Lisa Kilduff | 185 | 5.0 | |
| Turnout | | | 38.9 | |
| Conservative hold | | Swing | | |
| Conservative hold | | Swing | | |
| Conservative hold | | Swing | | |

=== Hanger Hill ===
Hanger Hill (3)
| Party | Candidate | Votes | % | ±% |
|---|---|---|---|---|
| Conservative | Barbara Yerolemou | 2,158 | 52.8 | |
| Conservative | Diana Pagan | 2,079 | | |
| Conservative | Nigel Sumner | 2,037 | | |
| Liberal Democrats | Jeannine Andre | 742 | 18.2 | |
| Liberal Democrats | Jonathan Hulley | 695 | | |
| Labour | Immi Chadha | 675 | 16.5 | |
| Liberal Democrats | Anna Lloyd-James | 652 | | |
| Labour | Shabir Ahmed | 593 | | |
| Labour | Amanda Norrie | 559 | | |
| Green | Thomas Fisher | 510 | 12.5 | |
| Turnout | | | 39.2 | |
| Conservative hold | | Swing | | |
| Conservative hold | | Swing | | |
| Conservative hold | | Swing | | |

=== Hobbayne ===
Hobbayne (3)
| Party | Candidate | Votes | % | ±% |
|---|---|---|---|---|
| Conservative | Colm Costello | 1,532 | 37.7 | |
| Conservative | Rosa Popham | 1,319 | | |
| Labour | Phyllis Greenhead | 1,298 | 31.9 | |
| Conservative | Charley Touma | 1,184 | | |
| Labour | Raymond Wall | 1,109 | | |
| Labour | Mohammed Kausar | 1,039 | | |
| Liberal Democrats | Michael Pidoux | 648 | 15.9 | |
| Liberal Democrats | Oliver Murphy | 640 | | |
| Green | Deborah Miles | 589 | 14.5 | |
| Liberal Democrats | Mohammed Muman | 583 | | |
| Turnout | | | 39.5 | |
| Conservative gain from Labour | | Swing | | |
| Conservative gain from Labour | | Swing | | |
| Labour hold | | Swing | | |

=== Lady Margaret ===
Lady Margaret (3)
| Party | Candidate | Votes | % | ±% |
|---|---|---|---|---|
| Labour | Jarnail Singh Jandu | 1,674 | 57.1 | |
| Labour | Gurchuran Singh | 1,627 | | |
| Labour | Maninder Kaur Keith | 1,623 | | |
| Conservative | Jyotika Patel | 854 | 29.1 | |
| Conservative | June Regan | 846 | | |
| Conservative | Michael Pack | 836 | | |
| Liberal Democrats | Rusi Dalal | 404 | 13.8 | |
| Liberal Democrats | Mark Robbins | 404 | | |
| Liberal Democrats | Stephen Gee | 369 | | |
| Turnout | | | 33.0 | |
| Labour hold | | Swing | | |
| Labour hold | | Swing | | |
| Labour hold | | Swing | | |

=== North Greenford ===
North Greenford (3)
| Party | Candidate | Votes | % | ±% |
|---|---|---|---|---|
| Labour | Shahbaz Ahmed | 1,488 | 35.8 | |
| Labour | Param Sandhu | 1,483 | | |
| Labour | Patricia Walker | 1,476 | | |
| Conservative | Douglas Cecil | 1400 | 33.7 | |
| Conservative | Sarah Probert | 1243 | | |
| Conservative | John Hotti | 1212 | | |
| Liberal Democrats | Olive Douglas | 706 | 17.0 | |
| Liberal Democrats | Helen McKay | 626 | | |
| Independent | Frank Kilduff | 561 | 13.5 | |
| Liberal Democrats | Norah Grajnert | 445 | | |
| Turnout | | | 40.6 | |
| Labour hold | | Swing | | |
| Labour hold | | Swing | | |
| Labour hold | | Swing | | |

=== Northfield ===
Northfield (3)
| Party | Candidate | Votes | % | ±% |
|---|---|---|---|---|
| Conservative | David Millican | 1,942 | 41.0 | |
| Conservative | Mark Reen | 1,845 | | |
| Conservative | Philip Taylor | 1,801 | | |
| Labour | Keiron Gavan | 1022 | 21.6 | |
| Labour | Simon Woodroofe | 949 | | |
| Labour | Margaret Majumdar | 948 | | |
| Green | Isobel Tomlinson | 903 | 19.1 | |
| Liberal Democrats | Susan Kendrick | 869 | 18.3 | |
| Liberal Democrats | Marion McNeill | 804 | | |
| Liberal Democrats | Peter Thornhill | 743 | | |
| Turnout | | | 42.8 | |
| Conservative gain from Labour | | Swing | | |
| Conservative gain from Labour | | Swing | | |
| Conservative gain from Labour | | Swing | | |

=== Northolt Mandeville ===
Northolt Mandeville (3)
| Party | Candidate | Votes | % | ±% |
|---|---|---|---|---|
| Conservative | Hazel Ware | 1,724 | 51.0 | |
| Conservative | Eileen Harris | 1,713 | | |
| Conservative | Dawn Larmouth | 1,597 | | |
| Labour | Walter Bernard | 1184 | 35.0 | |
| Labour | Timothy Murtagh | 1117 | | |
| Labour | Surinder Varma | 1066 | | |
| Liberal Democrats | Alan Miller | 472 | 14.0 | |
| Liberal Democrats | John Seymour | 409 | | |
| Liberal Democrats | Myer Salaman | 398 | | |
| Turnout | | | 36.5 | |
| Conservative hold | | Swing | | |
| Conservative hold | | Swing | | |
| Conservative hold | | Swing | | |

=== Northolt West End ===
Northolt West End (3)
| Party | Candidate | Votes | % | ±% |
|---|---|---|---|---|
| Labour | Bassam Mahfouz | 1,299 | 46.6 | |
| Labour | Michael Elliott | 1,283 | | |
| Labour | Brian Reeves | 1,236 | | |
| Conservative | Ivor Bush | 1004 | 36.0 | |
| Conservative | Leslie Pickett | 998 | | |
| Conservative | George Harris | 992 | | |
| Liberal Democrats | Judith Ducker | 487 | 17.5 | |
| Liberal Democrats | Caroline Moir | 427 | | |
| Liberal Democrats | Pantea Etessami | 383 | | |
| Turnout | | | 30.6 | |
| Labour hold | | Swing | | |
| Labour hold | | Swing | | |
| Labour hold | | Swing | | |

=== Norwood Green ===
Norwood Green (3)
| Party | Candidate | Votes | % | ±% |
|---|---|---|---|---|
| Labour | Virendra Sharma | 1,700 | 57.2 | |
| Labour | Rajinder Singh Mann | 1,654 | | |
| Labour | Mohammad Aslam | 1,613 | | |
| Conservative | Jasbir Kaur Chadha | 795 | 26.8 | |
| Conservative | David Minty | 772 | | |
| Conservative | Sumit Thaper | 684 | | |
| Liberal Democrats | Becky Harvey | 475 | 16.0 | |
| Liberal Democrats | James Reilly | 406 | | |
| Liberal Democrats | Diane Wylie | 359 | | |
| Turnout | | | 35.5 | |
| Labour hold | | Swing | | |
| Labour hold | | Swing | | |
| Labour hold | | Swing | | |

=== Perivale ===
Perivale (3)
| Party | Candidate | Votes | % | ±% |
|---|---|---|---|---|
| Conservative | Peter Allott | 1,858 | 44.8 | |
| Conservative | Edmond Yeo | 1,732 | | |
| Conservative | Clifford Pile | 1,712 | | |
| Labour | Karen Hunte | 1571 | 37.9 | |
| Labour | Wendy Langan | 1546 | | |
| Labour | Umesh Sharma | 1361 | | |
| Liberal Democrats | John Ducker | 528 | 12.7 | |
| Liberal Democrats | Anne Wilson | 500 | | |
| Liberal Democrats | Alastair Moir | 466 | | |
| CPA | Martin Deadman | 189 | 4.6 | |
| Turnout | | | 41.9 | |
| Conservative gain from Labour | | Swing | | |
| Conservative gain from Labour | | Swing | | |
| Conservative gain from Labour | | Swing | | |

=== South Acton ===
South Acton (3)
| Party | Candidate | Votes | % | ±% |
|---|---|---|---|---|
| Labour | Elizabeth Brookes | 1,128 | 32.4 | |
| Labour | Yvonne Johnson | 1,062 | | |
| Labour | John Gallagher | 1,062 | | |
| Conservative | Emmeline Owens | 1046 | 30.0 | |
| Conservative | Benjamin Dennehy | 1043 | | |
| Conservative | Bernard Bunting | 1004 | | |
| Liberal Democrats | Andrew Steed | 920 | 26.4 | |
| Liberal Democrats | Huw Lloyd-James | 893 | | |
| Liberal Democrats | Nicholas Winkfield | 856 | | |
| Green | Brian Outten | 387 | 11.1 | |
| Turnout | | | 36.4 | |
| Labour hold | | Swing | | |
| Labour hold | | Swing | | |
| Labour hold | | Swing | | |

=== Southall Broadway ===
Southall Broadway (3)
| Party | Candidate | Votes | % | ±% |
|---|---|---|---|---|
| Labour | Manjit Singh | 2,094 | 57.4 | |
| Labour | Jagdish Gupta | 1,990 | | |
| Labour | Zahida Khilji-Noori | 1,937 | | |
| Conservative | Gulbash Singh | 1262 | 34.6 | |
| Conservative | Tariq Choudhary | 1100 | | |
| Conservative | Charanjit Sund | 1083 | | |
| Liberal Democrats | Veronica Harding | 293 | 8.0 | |
| Liberal Democrats | Dietlinde Hatherall | 238 | | |
| Liberal Democrats | Inge Veecock | 222 | | |
| Turnout | | | 39.9 | |
| Labour hold | | Swing | | |
| Labour hold | | Swing | | |
| Labour hold | | Swing | | |

=== Southall Green ===
Southall Green (3)
| Party | Candidate | Votes | % | ±% |
|---|---|---|---|---|
| Labour | Jasbir Kaur Anand | 1,933 | 54.4 | |
| Labour | Kamaljit Singh Dhindsa | 1,845 | | |
| Labour | Swarn Singh Kang | 1,794 | | |
| Respect | Salvinder Singh Dhillon | 763 | 21.5 | |
| Respect | Iqbal Khan | 702 | | |
| Respect | Mohamed Nur | 676 | | |
| Conservative | Rajinder Singh | 657 | 18.5 | |
| Conservative | Sagli Jassal | 642 | | |
| Conservative | Jallo Sondh | 584 | | |
| Liberal Democrats | Paul Gooch | 201 | 5.7 | |
| Liberal Democrats | Margaret Rose | 193 | | |
| Liberal Democrats | Esme Mellor | 185 | | |
| Turnout | | | 37.8 | |
| Labour hold | | Swing | | |
| Labour hold | | Swing | | |
| Labour hold | | Swing | | |

=== Southfield ===
Southfield (3)
| Party | Candidate | Votes | % | ±% |
|---|---|---|---|---|
| Liberal Democrats | Harvey Rose | 1,388 | 33.6 | |
| Conservative | Elizabeth Reilly | 1,376 | 33.3 | |
| Liberal Democrats | Gary Malcolm | 1,360 | | |
| Conservative | Huw Merriman | 1,330 | | |
| Conservative | Robert Morley | 1,291 | | |
| Liberal Democrats | Anthony Miller | 1,149 | | |
| Labour | Colin Bastin | 680 | 16.5 | |
| Green | Sebastian Diamond | 579 | 14.0 | |
| Labour | Linda Kietz | 558 | | |
| Labour | Abdullah Gulaid | 555 | | |
| UKIP | Rex Carter | 104 | 2.5 | |
| Turnout | | | 37.5 | |
| Liberal Democrats hold | | Swing | | |
| Conservative gain from Liberal Democrats | | Swing | | |
| Liberal Democrats hold | | Swing | | |

=== Walpole ===
Walpole (3)
| Party | Candidate | Votes | % | ±% |
|---|---|---|---|---|
| Conservative | Ann Chapman | 1,551 | 37.0 | |
| Conservative | John Cowing | 1,445 | | |
| Conservative | Ashok Kapoor | 1,307 | | |
| Liberal Democrats | Mark Aplin | 1193 | 28.5 | |
| Liberal Democrats | John Mitchell | 1053 | | |
| Labour | Martin Beecroft | 994 | 23.7 | |
| Liberal Democrats | John Maycock | 989 | | |
| Labour | Yoel Gordon | 943 | | |
| Labour | Sian Vasey | 894 | | |
| Green | Sarah Edwards | 454 | 10.8 | |
| Green | Rachel Sanger | 419 | | |
| Green | George Foy | 418 | | |
| Turnout | | | 43.0 | |
| Conservative gain from Labour | | Swing | | |
| Conservative gain from Labour | | Swing | | |
| Conservative gain from Labour | | Swing | | |

== Notable results ==
Leonora Thompson (Leader of Ealing Council) lost her Greenford Broadway seat after a recount.

== Reactions ==
David Cameron (Leader of the Conservatives at the time) stated, "It is obviously encouraging to win in an area where we do not have any members of parliament".

The new leader of Ealing Council said, "People in this borough are fed up with a council that wasn't listening to them on things like the west London tram."
