= 2002 Ealing London Borough Council election =

2002 local election in England

- 2 May 2002

All 69 seats to Ealing London Borough Council 35 seats needed for a majority

	First party	Second party	Third party
Party	Labour	Conservative	Liberal Democrats
Last election	53 seats	15 seats	3 seats
Seats before	53	15	3
Seats won	48	17	4
Seat change	▼5	▲2	▲1
- Map of the results of the 2002 Ealing council election. Conservatives in blue, Labour in red, and Liberal Democrats in yellow.
Council control before election
1998
Labour
Elected Council control
2002
Labour

Elections for Ealing Council in London were held on 2 May 2002. The 2002 United Kingdom local elections took place on the same day.

All 69 seats in the council was up for election, with three seats in each of the electoral wards. Labour Party retained their control of the majority with 48 seats.

== Result summary ==
Ealing local election result 2006
Party	Seats	Net change	Seats %	Votes %	Votes
Labour	48	▼5	69.6	47.3	90,035
Conservative	17	▲2	24.6	31.3	59,589
Liberal Democrats	4	▲1	5.8	16.7	31,763
Green	0	Steady	0	3.1	5,871
Others	0	Steady	0	1.6	3,054
Total	69	N/A	100%	100%	190,312
Source:London Councils, London Datastore

== Ward results ==
=== Acton Central ===
Acton Central
Party	Candidate	Votes	%
Labour	Julian Bell	1,406	17.3
Labour	John Delany	1,336	16.5
Labour	Laurence Evans	1,091	14.3
Conservative	Michael Ryan	856	10.6
Conservative	Faris Amin	848	10.5
Conservative	John Ross	812	10.0
Green	Matthew Harrison	456	5.6
Liberal Democrats	Angela Todd-Drake	438	5.4
Liberal Democrats	Huw Lloyd James	412	5.1
Liberal Democrats	Fiona Grabowski	382	4.7
Total votes		8,105	100
Turnout			31.5

=== Cleveland ===
Cleveland
Party	Candidate	Votes	%
Conservative	Ian Gibb	1,481	13.7
Conservative	Brian Castle	1,423	13.2
Conservative	John Popham	1,415	13.1
Labour	Wendy Shaw	1,080	10.0
Liberal Democrats	Francesco Fruzza	1,075	9.9
Labour	Wiktor Moszczynski	1,056	9.8
Labour	Mohammed Kausar	999	9.2
Liberal Democrats	Simon Rowley	939	8.7
Liberal Democrats	Pantea Etessami	889	8.2
Green	Astra Seibe	354	3.3
UKIP	Daniel Moss	101	0.9
Total votes		10,812	100
Turnout			39.7

=== Dormers Wells ===
Dormers Wells
Party	Candidate	Votes	%
Labour	Tejinder Dhami	1,500	23.5
Labour	Madhavrao Patil	1,417	22.2
Labour	Joginder Saroe	1,348	21.2
Conservative	Margaret Bailes-Collins	344	5.4
Conservative	Daphne Langley	334	5.2
Conservative	Anthony Nolder	313	4.9
Socialist Labour	Nigar Butt	207	3.3
Liberal Democrats	David Banks	193	3.0
Liberal Democrats	David Williams	174	2.7
Liberal Democrats	Christopher Pidoux	152	2.4
Green	Rachel Sanger	137	2.2
Socialist Labour	Sukant Chandan	129	2.0
Socialist Labour	Iris Cremer	127	2.0
Total votes		6,375	100
Turnout			26.8

=== Ealing Broadway ===
Ealing Broadway
Party	Candidate	Votes	%
Conservative	Ian Potts	1,453	17.5
Conservative	Anthony Young	1,416	17.1
Conservative	David Scott	1,413	17.0
Labour	James Bradbury	748	9.0
Labour	Theresa Byrne	737	8.9
Labour	Sherrell Brett	700	8.5
Liberal Democrats	Catherine O'Brien	521	6.3
Liberal Democrats	Vera Hankinson	482	5.8
Liberal Democrats	Alastair Maclachlan	431	5.2
Green	Margaret Cook	392	4.7
Total votes		8,293	100
Turnout			31.5

=== Ealing Common ===
Ealing Common
Party	Candidate	Votes	%
Conservative	Ian Green	1,339	13.8
Liberal Democrats	Jon Ball	1,305	13.5
Conservative	Anthony Brown	1,268	13.1
Liberal Democrats	Becky Harvey	1,233	12.7
Conservative	Eileen Harris	1,216	12.6
Liberal Democrats	Nigel Bakhai	1,186	12.2
Labour	Alan Jones	664	6.9
Labour	Ataur Siddiquey	555	5.7
Labour	Renu Sharma	542	5.6
Green	Peter Burton	380	3.9
Total votes		9,688	100
Turnout			35.0

=== East Acton ===
East Acton
Party	Candidate	Votes	%
Labour	Kathleen Crawford	1,305	17.0
Labour	Phillip Portwood	1,256	16.4
Labour	Paul Woodgate	1,183	15.4
Conservative	Justine Greening	1,018	13.3
Conservative	Paul Hill	952	12.4
Conservative	Christopher Hack	931	12.2
Liberal Democrats	Donald Allwright	360	4.7
Liberal Democrats	Timothy Longman	334	4.4
Liberal Democrats	Margaret Rose	318	4.2
Total votes		7,657	100
Turnout			29.8

=== Elthorne ===
Elthorne
Party	Candidate	Votes	%
Labour	Julia Clements-Elliott	1,290	16.5
Labour	Christopher Payne	1,265	16.1
Labour	Manmoham Sondh	1,115	14.2
Conservative	Nina Bressey	584	7.4
Conservative	Paul Cadier	576	7.4
Conservative	Audrey Shaw	552	7.0
Liberal Democrats	Peter Hutchison	483	6.2
Liberal Democrats	Susan Kendrick	428	5.5
Liberal Democrats	Fay Edinborough	414	5.3
Green	Deborah Miles	413	5.3
Green	Sebastian Diamond	360	4.6
Green	Douglas Earl	352	4.5
Total votes		7,832	100
Turnout			29.2

=== Greenford Broadway ===
Greenford Broadway
Party	Candidate	Votes	%
Labour	Sonika Nirwal	1,252	17.6
Labour	Jill Stockoe	1,230	17.3
Labour	Leonora Thomson	1,207	16.9
Conservative	Maureen Crosby	827	11.6
Conservative	Kathryn Kent	780	10.9
Conservative	Mark Buhler	741	10.4
Liberal Democrats	Dorothy Brooks	370	5.2
Liberal Democrats	Roger Davies	370	5.2
Liberal Democrats	Gillian Rowley	349	4.9
Total votes		7,126	100
Turnout			27.4

=== Greenford Green ===
Greenford Green
Party	Candidate	Votes	%
Conservative	William Brooks	1,482	16.0
Conservative	Susan Emment	1,467	15.8
Conservative	Jason Stacey	1,452	15.7
Labour	Neil Richardson	1,350	14.6
Labour	Shabira Turner	1,247	13.5
Labour	Timothy Murtagh	1,232	13.3
Liberal Democrats	Raymond Alcock	361	3.9
Liberal Democrats	Patricia Palmer	339	3.7
Liberal Democrats	Madeline Jay	329	3.5
Total votes		9,259	100
Turnout			34.7

=== Hanger Hill ===
Hanger Hill
Party	Candidate	Votes	%
Conservative	Diana Pagan	1,646	19.0
Conservative	Barbara Yerolemou	1,618	18.7
Conservative	Nigel Sumner	1,613	18.6
Labour	Joshua Bolland	693	8.0
Labour	Sian Vasey	632	7.3
Labour	Atallah Said	594	6.8
Liberal Democrats	Anthony Miller	552	6.4
Liberal Democrats	Christopher Creighton	547	6.3
Liberal Democrats	Francis Salaun	407	4.7
Green	John Byrne	364	4.2
Total votes		8,666	100
Turnout			32.4

=== Hobbayne ===
Hobbayne
Party	Candidate	Votes	%
Labour	Phyllis Greenhead	1,501	18.0
Labour	Stephen Sears	1,436	17.3
Labour	Raymond Wall	1,374	16.5
Conservative	Joan Ansell	879	10.6
Conservative	Colm Costello	824	9.9
Conservative	Caroline Brooks	776	9.3
Liberal Democrats	Alison Harvey	428	5.1
Liberal Democrats	Joanne McKenna	392	4.7
Green	Brian Outten	368	4.4
Liberal Democrats	Oliver Murphy	349	4.2
Total votes		8,327	100
Turnout			31.7

=== Lady Margaret ===
Lady Margaret
Party	Candidate	Votes	%
Labour	Gurcharan Singh	1,713	24.2
Labour	Tej Bagha	1,668	23.6
Labour	Ranjit Dheer	1,635	23.1
Conservative	George Lafford	389	5.5
Conservative	June Regan	386	5.5
Conservative	Gerald Power	378	5.4
Liberal Democrats	Margaret Sharma	202	2.9
Liberal Democrats	Rusi Dalal	201	2.8
Liberal Democrats	Shirley Dallaway	199	2.8
Socialist Labour	Teja Basran	110	1.6
Socialist Labour	David Morgan	104	1.5
Socialist Labour	Eloisa Rule	81	1.1
Total votes		7,066	100
Turnout			27.7

=== North Greenford ===
North Greenford
Party	Candidate	Votes	%
Labour	Richard Porter	1,668	18.8
Labour	Frederick Varley	1,654	18.5
Labour	Shital Manro	1,618	18.2
Conservative	David Freeman	906	10.2
Conservative	Brenda Hall	823	9.2
Conservative	Ajay Sandhu	744	8.4
Liberal Democrats	Olive Douglas	415	4.7
Liberal Democrats	Helen McKay	361	4.1
Liberal Democrats	Norah Grajnert	304	3.4
Green	Stella Long	257	2.9
UKIP	David Malindine	140	1.6
Total votes		8,890	100
Turnout			34.2

=== Northfield ===
Northfield
Party	Candidate	Votes	%
Labour	Kieron Gavan	1,276	13.4
Labour	Simon Woodroofe	1,214	12.7
Labour	Margaret Majumdar	1,191	12.5
Conservative	Mark Nicholson	1,118	11.7
Conservative	Jonathan Oxley	1,118	11.7
Conservative	Doreen Power	1,025	10.7
Liberal Democrats	Imogen Dangerfield	705	7.4
Liberal Democrats	Kathleen Thomas	702	7.3
Green	Derek Allord-Brown	617	6.5
Liberal Democrats	Peter Thornhill	580	6.1
Total votes		9,546	100
Turnout			

=== Northolt Mandeville ===
Northolt Mandeville
Party	Candidate	Votes	%
Conservative	Peter Downham	1,476	17.0
Conservative	Glenn Murphy	1,455	16.7
Conservative	Hazel Ware	1,444	16.6
Labour	Allan Brown	1,250	14.4
Labour	Susan McLeod	1,175	13.5
Labour	Bassam Mahfouz	1,162	13.3
Liberal Democrats	John Seymour	258	3.0
Liberal Democrats	Dietlinde Hatherall	249	2.9
Liberal Democrats	Myer Salaman	230	2.6
Total votes		8,699	100
Turnout			33.48

=== Northolt West End ===
Northolt West End
Party	Candidate	Votes	%
Labour	David Bond	1,487	21.7
Labour	Sophie Hosking	1,338	19.5
Labour	Michael Elliott	1,299	18.9
Conservative	Bernard Furzer	672	9.8
Conservative	Joan Trinder	664	9.7
Conservative	Hugh Mordaunt	632	9.2
Liberal Democrats	Judith Ducker	272	4.0
Liberal Democrats	Patrick Dee	248	3.6
Liberal Democrats	Ida Goodwin	245	3.6
Total votes		6,857	100
Turnout			26.4

=== Norwood Green ===
Norwood Green
Party	Candidate	Votes	%
Labour	Virendra Sharma	1,708	24.6
Labour	Rajinder Mann	1,664	23.9
Labour	Mohammad Aslam	1,598	23.0
Conservative	Joseph Harris	459	6.6
Conservative	David Millican	417	6.0
Conservative	Ravinder Patel	413	5.9
Liberal Democrats	Michael Pidoux	192	2.8
Liberal Democrats	Martin Tod	181	2.6
Liberal Democrats	Michaela Tod	159	2.3
Green	Richard Scrase	157	2.3
Total votes		6,948	100
Turnout			30.0

=== Perivale ===
Perivale
Party	Candidate	Votes	%
Labour	Karen Hunte	1,390	17.0
Labour	Mark Karasinski	1,267	15.5
Labour	Inderjeet Nijhar	1,184	14.5
Conservative	Christine Catlin	1,145	14.0
Conservative	Edith Hetherington	1,102	13.5
Conservative	Clifford Pile	1,009	12.4
Liberal Democrats	Brian Cummings	383	4.7
Liberal Democrats	Anne Wilson	354	4.4
Liberal Democrats	John Ducker	326	4.0
Total votes		8,160	100
Turnout			31.0

=== South Acton ===
South Acton
Party	Candidate	Votes	%
Labour	Elizabeth Brookes	1,226	16.6
Labour	John Cudmore	1,222	16.6
Labour	Yvonne Johnson	1,180	16.0
Conservative	Norma Haythorn	665	9.0
Conservative	Christine Magnowska	621	8.4
Conservative	Wafik Moustafa	590	8.0
Liberal Democrats	Michael O'Connor	587	8.0
Liberal Democrats	Catherine Royce	568	7.7
Liberal Democrats	Nicholas Winkfield	504	6.9
Socialist Labour	Peter Hughes	105	1.4
Socialist Labour	Iqbal Khan	102	1.4
Total votes		7,370	100
Turnout			29.3

=== Southall Broadway ===
Southall Broadway
Party	Candidate	Votes	%
Labour	Gurdip Sahota	1,976	24.7
Labour	Ram Perdesi	1,960	24.5
Labour	Manjit Singh	1,941	24.2
Socialist Labour	Harpal Brar	424	5.3
Socialist Labour	Jagdev Samra	407	5.1
Socialist Labour	Surinder Cheema	396	4.9
Conservative	Geoffrey Belson	175	2.2
Conservative	Bryan Boese	173	2.2
Liberal Democrats	Nigel Bliss	145	1.8
Liberal Democrats	Anne Lloyd James	144	1.8
Conservative	Joanna Dabrowska	136	1.7
Liberal Democrats	Gary Purkiss	132	1.6
Total votes		8,009	100
Turnout			

=== Southall Green ===
Southall Green
Party	Candidate	Votes	%
Labour	Jabir Anand	2,269	27.5
Labour	Kamaljit Dhindsa	2,179	26.4
Labour	Swarm Kang	2,149	26.1
Conservative	Sheila Day	245	3.0
Conservative	Tajinderpal Virdee	223	2.7
Conservative	Myrtle Marshall	217	2.6
Liberal Democrats	Paul Gooch	209	2.5
Independent	Kiran Lal	186	2.3
Socialist Labour	Fahim Ahmed	147	1.8
Green	Michael Landon	102	1.2
Socialist Labour	Beth Handley	88	1.1
Liberal Democrats	Lyn Woodcock	86	1.0
Liberal Democrats	Alan Miller	84	1.0
Socialist Labour	Carlos Rule	67	0.8
Total votes		8,251	100
Turnout			30.5

=== Southfield ===
Southfield
Party	Candidate	Votes	%
Liberal Democrats	Andrew Mitchell	1,490	16.8
Liberal Democrats	Harvey Rose	1,440	16.3
Liberal Democrats	Gary Malcolm	1,414	16.0
Labour	Colin Bastin	823	9.3
Labour	Linda Kietz	708	8.0
Conservative	Doreen Gibbs	669	7.6
Labour	Philip Chadha	668	7.5
Conservative	Janet Young	622	7.0
Conservative	Jamal Khan	541	6.1
Green	Christine Meiklejohn	342	3.9
UKIP	Rex Carter	90	1.0
NCDMV!	Adam Porter	43	0.5
Total votes		8,850	100
Turnout			32.8

=== Walpole ===
Walpole
Party	Candidate	Votes	%
Labour	Martin Beecroft	1,851	19.4
Labour	Yoel Gordon	1,731	18.2
Labour	Peter Wicks	1,584	16.6
Conservative	Graham Hill	844	8.9
Green	Sarah Edwards	820	8.6
Conservative	Michael Pack	731	7.7
Conservative	Seema Kumar	713	7.5
Liberal Democrats	John Mitchell	465	4.9
Liberal Democrats	Stuart Bonar	451	4.7
Liberal Democrats	Timothy Parkin	336	3.5
Total votes		9,526	100
Turnout			35.5
