= 2010 Ealing London Borough Council election =

2010 local election in England

- 6 May 2010

All 69 seats to Ealing London Borough Council 35 seats needed for a majority

| | First party | Second party | Third party |
|---|---|---|---|
| Party | Labour | Conservative | Liberal Democrats |
| Last election | 28 seats | 38 seats | 3 seats |
| Seats before | 28 | 38 | 3 |
| Seats won | 40 | 24 | 5 |
| Seat change | ▲12 | ▼14 | ▲2 |
Council control before election
2006
Conservative
Council control after election
2010
Labour

Map of the results of the 2010 Ealing council election. Conservatives in blue, Labour in red and Liberal Democrats in yellow.

Elections for Ealing Council in London were held on 6 May 2010. The 2010 United Kingdom General Election and other local elections took place on the same day.

In London council elections the entire council is elected every four years, as opposed to some local elections where one councillor is elected every year in three of the four years.

The Labour Party gained control of the borough from the Conservatives, who themselves had taken control from Labour at the previous elections in 2006.

== Results ==
Ealing Council election result 2010
| Party | Seats | Gains | Losses | Net gain/loss | Seats % | Votes % | Votes | +/− |
|---|---|---|---|---|---|---|---|---|
| Labour | 40 | 12 | 0 | +12 | | | | |
| Conservative | 24 | 0 | 14 | -14 | | | | |
| Liberal Democrats | 5 | 2 | 0 | +2 | | | | |
| Green | 0 | 0 | 0 | 0 | | | | |
| Independent | 0 | 0 | 0 | 0 | | | | |
| CPA | 0 | 0 | 0 | 0 | | | | |
| UKIP | 0 | 0 | 0 | 0 | | | | |
| Libertarian | 0 | 0 | 0 | 0 | | | | |

== Wards and results ==
| Ward | Labour Seats | Conservative Seats | Liberal Democrat Seats | Change from 2006 |
|---|---|---|---|---|
| Acton Central | 3 | 0 | 0 | Labour gains three seats from the Conservatives |
| Cleveland | 0 | 3 | 0 | Labour gains three seats from the Conservatives |
| Dormers Wells | 3 | 0 | 0 | No change |
| Ealing Broadway | 0 | 3 | 0 | No change |
| Ealing Common | 0 | 2 | 1 | No change |
| East Acton | 3 | 0 | 0 | Labour gains two seats from the Conservatives |
| Elthorne | 2 | 0 | 1 | Labour and the LibDems each gain a seat from the Conservatives |
| Greenford Broadway | 3 | 0 | 0 | Labour gains one seat from the Conservatives |
| Greenford Green | 0 | 3 | 0 | No change |
| Hanger Hill | 0 | 3 | 0 | No change |
| Hobbayne | 1 | 2 | 0 | No change |
| Lady Margaret | 3 | 0 | 0 | No change |
| North Greenford | 3 | 0 | 0 | No change |
| Northfield | 0 | 3 | 0 | No change |
| Northolt Mandeville | 2 | 1 | 0 | Labour gains two seats from the Conservatives |
| Northolt West End | 3 | 0 | 0 | No change |
| Norwood Green | 3 | 0 | 0 | No change |
| Perivale | 2 | 1 | 0 | Labour gains two seats from the Conservatives |
| South Acton | 3 | 0 | 0 | No change |
| Southall Broadway | 3 | 0 | 0 | No change |
| Southall Green | 3 | 0 | 0 | No change |
| Southfield | 0 | 0 | 3 | LibDems gain one seat from the Conservatives |
| Walpole | 0 | 3 | 0 | No change |
| Total | 40 | 24 | 5 | |

== Detailed results ==
=== Acton Central ===
Acton Central (3)
| Party | Candidate | Votes | % | ±% |
|---|---|---|---|---|
| Labour | Daniel Crawford | 2,350 | 40.2 | |
| Labour | Patricia Walker | 2,064 | 35.3 | |
| Labour | Abdullah Gulaid | 1,943 | 33.3 | |
| Conservative | Vlod Barchuk | 1846 | 31.6 | |
| Conservative | Thomas Sweetman | 1689 | 28.9 | |
| Conservative | Seema Kumar | 1579 | 27.0 | |
| Liberal Democrats | Richard Cunningham | 1381 | 23.7 | |
| Liberal Democrats | Michael O'Connor | 1274 | 21.8 | |
| Liberal Democrats | Margarete Joachim | 1253 | 21.5 | |
| Green | Christina Meiklejohn | 581 | 10.0 | |
| CPA | Suzanne Fernandes | 199 | 3.4 | |
| Turnout | | 5839 | 58.71 | |

=== Cleveland ===
Cleveland (3)
| Party | Candidate | Votes | % | ±% |
|---|---|---|---|---|
| Conservative | Isobel Grant | 2,783 | 40.2 | |
| Conservative | John Popham | 2,778 | 40.1 | |
| Conservative | Gregory Stafford | 2,629 | 37.9 | |
| Liberal Democrats | Francesca Fruzza | 2181 | 31.5 | |
| Labour | Hermia Bell | 1862 | 26.9 | |
| Labour | Anthony Kelly | 1783 | 25.7 | |
| Liberal Democrats | John Maycock | 1669 | 24.1 | |
| Labour | Munir Ahmed | 1648 | 23.8 | |
| Liberal Democrats | Gary Purkiss | 1637 | 23.6 | |
| Green | Astra Seibe | 602 | 8.7 | |
| Turnout | | 6929 | 66.71 | |

=== Dormers Wells ===
Dormers Wells (3)
| Party | Candidate | Votes | % | ±% |
|---|---|---|---|---|
| Labour | Tejinder Singh Dhami | 3,289 | 53.7 | |
| Labour | Ranjit Dheer | 3,209 | 52.4 | |
| Labour | Tej Bagha | 3,200 | 52.3 | |
| Conservative | Awtar Singh Khaira | 1790 | 29.2 | |
| Conservative | Sarosh Khalil | 1481 | 24.2 | |
| Conservative | Chamkaur Singh Bhathal | 1445 | 23.6 | |
| Liberal Democrats | Genevieve Cameron | 864 | 14.1 | |
| Liberal Democrats | Leslie Glancy | 691 | 11.3 | |
| Liberal Democrats | Gillian Rowley | 574 | 9.4 | |
| Green | Conrad Bryan | 290 | 4.7 | |
| Turnout | | 6124 | 62.52 | |

=== Ealing Broadway ===
Ealing Broadway (3)
| Party | Candidate | Votes | % | ±% |
|---|---|---|---|---|
| Conservative | Ian Potts | 3,054 | 48.0 | |
| Conservative | David Scott | 2,876 | 45.2 | |
| Conservative | Anthony Young | 2,802 | 44.0 | |
| Liberal Democrats | Dorothy Brooks | 1841 | 28.9 | |
| Labour | John Culhane | 1456 | 22.9 | |
| Labour | Miriam Rice | 1391 | 21.8 | |
| Labour | Gareth Shaw | 1364 | 21.4 | |
| Liberal Democrats | Mark Sanders | 1277 | 20.1 | |
| Liberal Democrats | Patrick Salaun | 1272 | 20.0 | |
| Green | Sam Diamond | 779 | 12.2 | |
| Turnout | | 6367 | 62.82 | |

=== Ealing Common ===
Ealing Common (3)
| Party | Candidate | Votes | % | ±% |
|---|---|---|---|---|
| Liberal Democrats | Jon Ball | 2,637 | 42.0 | |
| Conservative | Joanna Dabrowska | 2,448 | 38.9 | |
| Conservative | Roz Reece | 2,409 | 38.3 | |
| Conservative | Karim Sacoor | 1963 | 31.2 | |
| Liberal Democrats | Doreen James | 1845 | 29.4 | |
| Liberal Democrats | Simon Rowley | 1773 | 28.2 | |
| Labour | Peter Mason | 1173 | 18.7 | |
| Labour | Liam Ward-Proud | 1058 | 16.8 | |
| Labour | Harbans Lal | 1048 | 16.7 | |
| Green | John Green | 787 | 12.5 | |
| UKIP | Julie Carter | 266 | 4.2 | |
| Turnout | | 6286 | 63.51 | |

=== East Acton ===
East Acton (3)
| Party | Candidate | Votes | % | ±% |
|---|---|---|---|---|
| Labour | Kathleen Crawford | 2,715 | 45.5 | |
| Labour | Hitesh Tailor | 2,313 | 38.8 | |
| Labour | Atallah Said | 2,266 | 38.0 | |
| Conservative | Jim Randall | 1786 | 29.9 | |
| Conservative | Kieran Mullan | 1745 | 29.3 | |
| Conservative | John Ross | 1673 | 28.0 | |
| Liberal Democrats | Sara Grey | 1343 | 22.5 | |
| Liberal Democrats | Andrew Mitchell | 1188 | 19.9 | |
| Liberal Democrats | Catherine Royce | 1168 | 19.6 | |
| Green | Amanda Whyte | 582 | 9.8 | |
| Turnout | | 5965 | 54.83 | |

=== Elthorne ===
Elthorne (3)
| Party | Candidate | Votes | % | ±% |
|---|---|---|---|---|
| Labour | Yoel Gordon | 2,236 | 35.9 | |
| Liberal Democrats | Nigel Bakhai | 1,974 | 31.7 | |
| Conservative | Anita Kapoor | 1,868 | 30.0 | |
| Labour | Omer Ahmed | 1854 | 29.8 | |
| Labour | Taranjit Kaur Chana | 1793 | 28.8 | |
| Conservative | Robert Kirkwood | 1782 | 28.6 | |
| Conservative | Theresa Mullins | 1767 | 28.4 | |
| Liberal Democrats | Peter Hutchison | 1728 | 27.8 | |
| Liberal Democrats | David Randles | 1494 | 24.0 | |
| Green | Christopher Warleigh-Lack | 768 | 12.3 | |
| Turnout | | 6223 | 61.4 | |

=== Greenford Broadway ===
Greenford Broadway (3)
| Party | Candidate | Votes | % | ±% |
|---|---|---|---|---|
| Labour | Julian Bell | 3,346 | 50.8 | |
| Labour | Timothy Murtagh | 2,979 | 45.2 | |
| Labour | Harbhajan Kaur | 2,908 | 44.2 | |
| Conservative | Carole Connelly | 2127 | 32.3 | |
| Conservative | Maureen Crosby | 2002 | 30.4 | |
| Liberal Democrats | Patrick Callaghan | 1671 | 25.4 | |
| Conservative | Jags Sanghera | 1478 | 22.4 | |
| Liberal Democrats | Ali Hassan | 1427 | 21.7 | |
| Liberal Democrats | Eva Fruzza | 1387 | 21.1 | |
| Independent | Tom Mitchell | 346 | 5.3 | |
| CPA | Natasha Kerr | 258 | 3.9 | |
| Turnout | | 6586 | 57.29 | |

=== Greenford Green ===
Greenford Green (3)
| Party | Candidate | Votes | % | ±% |
|---|---|---|---|---|
| Conservative | Jason Stacey | 2,587 | 43.3 | |
| Conservative | William Brooks | 2,512 | 42.1 | |
| Conservative | Susan Emment | 2,498 | 41.8 | |
| Labour | Vina Sharma | 2175 | 36.4 | |
| Labour | Paramjit Singh Sandhu | 2080 | 34.8 | |
| Labour | Shabira Turner | 2002 | 33.5 | |
| Liberal Democrats | Roger Davies | 883 | 14.8 | |
| Liberal Democrats | Donald Allwright | 872 | 14.6 | |
| Liberal Democrats | Rosemary Palmer | 860 | 14.4 | |
| Green | Nic Armstrong | 351 | 5.9 | |
| Turnout | | 5971 | 60.0 | |

=== Hanger Hill ===
Hanger Hill (3)
| Party | Candidate | Votes | % | ±% |
|---|---|---|---|---|
| Conservative | Diana Pagan | 3,136 | 50.1 | |
| Conservative | Benjamin Dennehy | 3,130 | 50.0 | |
| Conservative | Nigel Sumner | 2,976 | 47.6 | |
| Liberal Democrats | David Blake | 1623 | 25.9 | |
| Liberal Democrats | Sarah Mitchell | 1464 | 23.4 | |
| Liberal Democrats | Tony Miller | 1452 | 23.2 | |
| Labour | Raj Gill | 1402 | 22.4 | |
| Labour | Paul Woodgate | 1258 | 20.1 | |
| Labour | Prayer Nekati | 1216 | 19.4 | |
| Turnout | | 6256 | 61.97 | |

=== Hobbayne ===
Hobbayne (3)
| Party | Candidate | Votes | % | ±% |
|---|---|---|---|---|
| Labour | Ray Wall | 2,673 | 42.6 | |
| Labour | Wendy Langan | 2,580 | 41.1 | |
| Conservative | Colm Costello | 2,447 | 39.0 | |
| Labour | Neil Reynolds | 2425 | 38.7 | |
| Conservative | Rosa Popham | 2007 | 32.0 | |
| Conservative | Gerry Saravana-Wall | 1855 | 29.6 | |
| Liberal Democrats | James Armstrong | 1187 | 18.9 | |
| Liberal Democrats | Michael Pidoux | 861 | 13.7 | |
| Liberal Democrats | Mohamed Muman | 838 | 13.4 | |
| Green | Alex Warleigh-Lack | 598 | 9.5 | |
| Independent | Darshan Singh Bhinder | 245 | 3.9 | |
| Turnout | | 6274 | 64.83 | |

=== Lady Margaret ===
Lady Margaret (3)
| Party | Candidate | Votes | % | ±% |
|---|---|---|---|---|
| Labour | Karam Mohan | 3,101 | 47.6 | |
| Labour | Mohinder Kaur Midha | 3,063 | 47.0 | |
| Labour | Swaran Singh Padda | 2,939 | 45.1 | |
| Conservative | Gurcharan Singh | 2293 | 35.2 | |
| Conservative | Umesh Sharma | 2121 | 32.6 | |
| Conservative | Jarnail Singh Jandu | 1773 | 27.2 | |
| Liberal Democrats | Edward Coleman | 925 | 14.2 | |
| Liberal Democrats | Marion McNeill | 771 | 11.8 | |
| Liberal Democrats | Rusi Dalal | 736 | 11.3 | |
| Turnout | | 6516 | 63.12 | |

=== North Greenford ===
North Greenford (3)
| Party | Candidate | Votes | % | ±% |
|---|---|---|---|---|
| Labour | Theresa Byrne | 3,112 | 48.3 | |
| Labour | Shahbaz Ahmed | 3,074 | 47.7 | |
| Labour | Shital Manro | 2,843 | 44.1 | |
| Conservative | Stephen McKenzie | 2154 | 33.4 | |
| Conservative | Frank Kilduff | 2097 | 32.5 | |
| Conservative | Madhava Turumella | 1744 | 27.1 | |
| Liberal Democrats | David Mitchell | 935 | 14.5 | |
| Liberal Democrats | Oliver Murphy | 804 | 12.5 | |
| Liberal Democrats | Norah Grajnert | 735 | 11.4 | |
| Green | John Singh Hotti | 425 | 6.6 | |
| Turnout | | 6446 | 62.81 | |

=== Northfield ===
Northfield (3)
| Party | Candidate | Votes | % | ±% |
|---|---|---|---|---|
| Conservative | David Millican | 3,114 | 45.9 | |
| Conservative | Mark Reen | 2,812 | 41.4 | |
| Conservative | Philip Taylor | 2,731 | 40.3 | |
| Labour | Anthony Woods | 1808 | 26.6 | |
| Liberal Democrats | Susan Kendrick | 1807 | 26.6 | |
| Labour | Mez Roth | 1605 | 23.7 | |
| Labour | Navnit Kaur Dhesi | 1586 | 23.4 | |
| Liberal Democrats | Toran Shaw | 1396 | 20.6 | |
| Liberal Democrats | Peter Thornhill | 1296 | 19.1 | |
| Green | Ryan Allain | 981 | 14.5 | |
| Turnout | | 6785 | 68.46 | |

=== Northolt Mandeville ===
Northolt Mandeville (3)
| Party | Candidate | Votes | % | ±% |
|---|---|---|---|---|
| Labour | Chris Summers | 2,448 | 41.7 | |
| Labour | Ara Iskanderian | 2,310 | 39.4 | |
| Conservative | Eileen Harris | 2,218 | 37.8 | |
| Conservative | Hazel Ware | 2212 | 37.7 | |
| Labour | Natasha Shaikh | 2204 | 37.6 | |
| Conservative | John Salisbury | 2134 | 36.4 | |
| Liberal Democrats | Alan Miller | 858 | 14.6 | |
| Liberal Democrats | John Seymour | 726 | 12.4 | |
| Liberal Democrats | Myer Salaman | 711 | 12.1 | |
| BNP | Paul Winnett | 299 | 5.1 | |
| Turnout | | 5867 | 58.81 | |
| Rejected ballots | | 33 | | |
| Labour gain from Conservative | | Swing | | |
| Labour gain from Conservative | | Swing | | |
| Conservative hold | | Swing | | |

=== Northolt West End ===
Northolt West End (3)
| Party | Candidate | Votes | % | ±% |
|---|---|---|---|---|
| Labour | Brian Reeves | 2,833 | 49.7 | |
| Labour | Bassam Mahfouz | 2,679 | 47.0 | |
| Labour | Lauren Wall | 2,548 | 44.7 | |
| Conservative | Michael Mina | 1669 | 29.3 | |
| Conservative | Hasil Makkar | 1642 | 28.8 | |
| Conservative | Bud Klair | 1545 | 27.1 | |
| Liberal Democrats | Victoria Gill | 854 | 15.0 | |
| Liberal Democrats | Judith Ducker | 758 | 13.3 | |
| Liberal Democrats | Pantea Etessami | 601 | 10.6 | |
| BNP | David Furness | 548 | 9.6 | |
| Registered electors | | 9,780 | | |
| Turnout | | 5695 | 58.24 | |
| Labour hold | | Swing | | |
| Labour hold | | Swing | | |
| Labour hold | | Swing | | |

=== Norwood Green ===
Norwood Green (3)
| Party | Candidate | Votes | % | ±% |
|---|---|---|---|---|
| Labour | Gurmit Mann | 2,880 | 48.6 | |
| Labour | Rajinder Mann | 2,810 | 47.4 | |
| Labour | Mohammad Aslam | 2,789 | 47.0 | |
| Conservative | Gurdev Singh Brar | 1706 | 28.8 | |
| Conservative | Avtar Singh Buttar | 1631 | 27.5 | |
| Conservative | William Richens | 1591 | 26.8 | |
| Liberal Democrats | Margaret Sharma | 883 | 14.9 | |
| Liberal Democrats | Joseph Rowan | 781 | 13.2 | |
| Liberal Democrats | Harjinder Singh | 745 | 12.6 | |
| Green | Meena Hans | 420 | 7.1 | |
| Turnout | | 5928 | 62.04 | |

=== Perivale ===
Perivale (3)
| Party | Candidate | Votes | % | ±% |
|---|---|---|---|---|
| Labour | Sitarah Anjum | 2,793 | 42.8 | |
| Conservative | Justin Anderson | 2,779 | 42.6 | |
| Labour | Ed Rennie | 2,728 | 41.8 | |
| Labour | Kieron Gavan | 2704 | 41.5 | |
| Conservative | Clifford Pile | 2565 | 39.3 | |
| Conservative | Edmond Yeo | 2468 | 37.8 | |
| Liberal Democrats | John Ducker | 1104 | 16.9 | |
| Liberal Democrats | Anne Wilson | 1023 | 15.7 | |
| Liberal Democrats | Maciej Psyk | 973 | 14.9 | |
| Turnout | | 6523 | 60.01 | |

=== South Acton ===
South Acton (3)
| Party | Candidate | Votes | % | ±% |
|---|---|---|---|---|
| Labour | John Gallagher | 2,392 | 42.2 | |
| Labour | Yvonne Johnson | 2,326 | 41.0 | |
| Labour | Mik Sabiers | 2,042 | 36.0 | |
| Conservative | Paul Hill | 1846 | 32.6 | |
| Conservative | Marie Hartley | 1760 | 31.0 | |
| Liberal Democrats | Tom Parkinson | 1524 | 26.9 | |
| Conservative | Stefan Krok-Leatherby | 1496 | 26.4 | |
| Liberal Democrats | Emmanuel Sheehan | 1133 | 20.0 | |
| Green | David Northcott | 683 | 12.0 | |
| Liberal Democrats | David Zerdin | 469 | 8.3 | |
| Turnout | | 5671 | 58.67 | |

=== Southall Broadway ===
Southall Broadway (3)
| Party | Candidate | Votes | % | ±% |
|---|---|---|---|---|
| Labour | Zahida Noori | 3,947 | 58.2 | |
| Labour | M.Shahid Kausar | 3,788 | 55.9 | |
| Labour | Surinder Varma | 3,715 | 54.8 | |
| Conservative | Gulbash Singh | 1930 | 28.5 | |
| Conservative | Manjit Singh | 1916 | 28.3 | |
| Conservative | Jagdish Gupta | 1627 | 24.0 | |
| Independent | Dalawar Chaudhry | 908 | 13.4 | |
| Liberal Democrats | Nigel Bliss | 477 | 7.0 | |
| Liberal Democrats | Veronica Harding | 406 | 6.0 | |
| Liberal Democrats | Inge Veecock | 316 | 4.7 | |
| Turnout | | 6782 | 62.35 | |

=== Southall Green ===
Southall Green (3)
| Party | Candidate | Votes | % | ±% |
|---|---|---|---|---|
| Labour | Jasbir Kaur Anand | 3,755 | 58.9 | |
| Labour | Kamaljit Singh Dhindsa | 3,592 | 56.4 | |
| Labour | Swarn Singh Kang | 3,547 | 55.7 | |
| Conservative | Surinder Sund | 1732 | 27.2 | |
| Conservative | Atamdeep Singh Khosa | 1710 | 26.8 | |
| Conservative | Mohammad Javaid | 1659 | 26.0 | |
| Liberal Democrats | Heather Matthews | 634 | 10.0 | |
| Liberal Democrats | Pat Mellor | 522 | 8.2 | |
| Liberal Democrats | Margaret Rose | 491 | 7.7 | |
| Turnout | | 6371 | 59.11 | |

=== Southfield ===
Southfield (3)
| Party | Candidate | Votes | % | ±% |
|---|---|---|---|---|
| Liberal Democrats | Harvey Rose | 3,089 | 45.4 | |
| Liberal Democrats | Gary Malcolm | 2,961 | 43.5 | |
| Liberal Democrats | Andrew Steed | 2,654 | 39.0 | |
| Conservative | Jack Freeman | 2400 | 35.3 | |
| Conservative | Eleri Ebenezer | 2251 | 33.1 | |
| Conservative | Robert Morley | 2117 | 31.1 | |
| Labour | Colin Bastin | 1117 | 16.4 | |
| Labour | Jack Tattersall | 1009 | 14.8 | |
| Labour | Linda Kietz | 935 | 13.7 | |
| Green | Mohammed Jiwa | 561 | 8.2 | |
| UKIP | Rex Carter | 189 | 2.8 | |
| Turnout | | 6802 | 77.28 | |

=== Walpole ===
Walpole (3)
| Party | Candidate | Votes | % | ±% |
|---|---|---|---|---|
| Conservative | Ann Chapman | 2,704 | 40.6 | |
| Conservative | John Cowing | 2,314 | 34.8 | |
| Conservative | Ashok Kapoor | 2,023 | 30.4 | |
| Labour | Paul Conlan | 1971 | 29.6 | |
| Labour | Rupa Huq | 1754 | 26.4 | |
| Labour | Wiktor Moszczynski | 1628 | 24.5 | |
| Liberal Democrats | John Mitchell | 1430 | 21.5 | |
| Liberal Democrats | Colin Izzard | 1387 | 20.8 | |
| Liberal Democrats | Robin Whittaker | 1357 | 20.4 | |
| Green | Sarah Edwards | 792 | 11.9 | |
| Green | Eleanor Tomlinson | 580 | 8.7 | |
| Green | Glendra Read | 456 | 6.9 | |
| Independent | Eric Leach | 388 | 5.8 | |
| Libertarian | Timothy Carpenter | 93 | 1.4 | |
| Turnout | | 6653 | 69.65 | |
