= Bassam Mahfouz =

British politician

Councillor Bassam Mahfouz AM
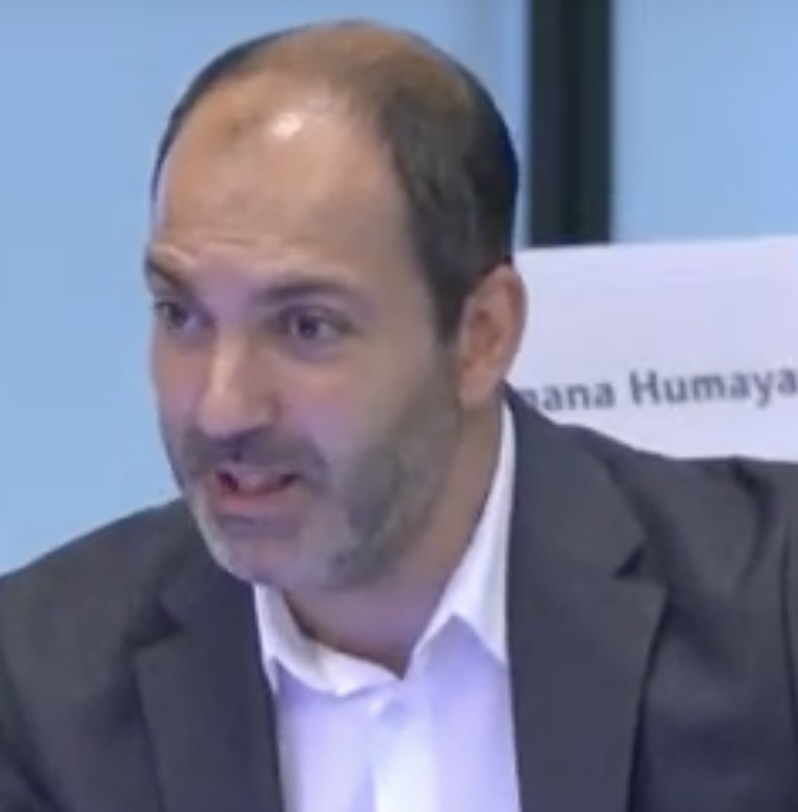
- Mahfouz in 2024

Member of the London Assembly for Ealing and Hillingdon
- Incumbent
- Assumed office 6 May 2024
- Preceded by: Onkar Sahota
- Majority: 4,861 (2.5%)

Member of Ealing Council for Northolt West End
- Incumbent
- Assumed office 5 May 2005
- Preceded by: Sophie Hosking

Personal details
- Born: Beirut, Lebanon
- Party: Labour
- Website: Official website

Bassam Mahfouz is a British politician serving as Member of the London Assembly for Ealing and Hillingdon since 2024. A member of the Labour Party, he has served as a Member of Ealing Council since 2005.

== Early life and education ==
Mahfouz was born in Beirut, Lebanon but fled the Lebanese civil war with his family aged four and settled in Northolt, London. He attended St. Raphael's RC Primary School and Gunnersbury High School.

Prior to becoming a London Assembly Member, Bassam ran a refugee charity in south-west London, which supported over 2,000 people a year. He also worked for a G15 housing association, leading on employability, digital inclusion, tackling health inequalities and advice services.

== Political career ==
Mahfouz was first elected to the Ealing London Borough Council in 2005 at the age of 24. He unsuccessfully contested Northolt Mandeville in the 2002 election.

In 2006 election he was elected in Northolt West End ward. Mahfouz is currently serving as Cabinet Member for Safe and Genuinely Affordable Homes on the Ealing London Borough Council.

In the 2010 United Kingdom general election he was the Labour candidate in Ealing Central and Acton but was defeated by Conservative candidate Angie Bray.

Mahfouz was elected to the London Assembly in 2024, representing the constituency of Ealing and Hillingdon, winning the seat with 72,356 votes.

Since being elected he has campaigned on step-free access at London Underground stations in his constituency, seeing improvements at Northwood, Eastcote and Turnham Green stations.

At the London Assembly he is Deputy Chair of the Audit Panel, and sits on the Budget and Performance Committee, the Environment Committee and the Transport Committee.
