= Southall =

Area of London Borough of Ealing, England

Coordinates: 51°30′40″N 00°22′32″W

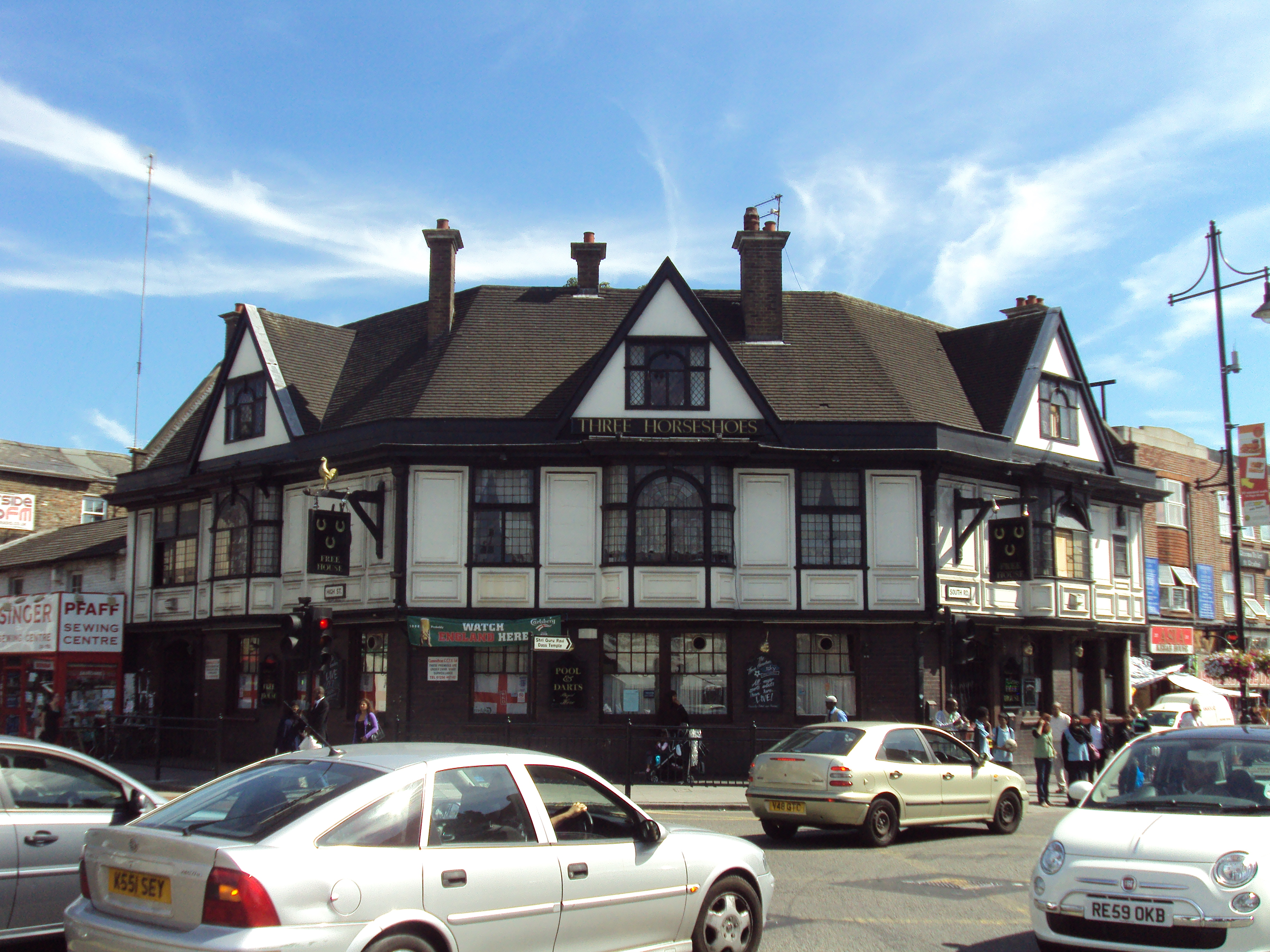
- The Three Horseshoes, a former pub, once in the centre of Southall

- Location within Greater London
- Population: 78,253 (2021 Census)
- OS grid reference: TQ125805
  - Charing Cross: 10.7 mi (17.2 km) Wre
- London borough: Ealing
- Ceremonial county: Greater London
- Region: London
- Country: England
- Sovereign state: United Kingdom
- Post town: SOUTHALL
- Postcode district: UB1, UB2
- Dialling code: 020
- Police: Metropolitan
- Fire: London
- Ambulance: London
- UK Parliament: Ealing Southall
- London Assembly: Ealing and Hillingdon

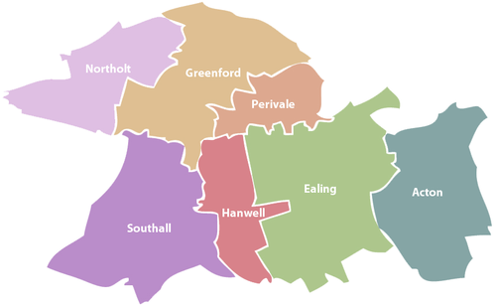
Map of the London Borough of Ealing, showing the location of Southall, one of Ealing's seven major towns

Southall (/ˈsaʊθɔːl/) is a large suburban town in West London, England, part of the London Borough of Ealing and is one of its seven major towns.

It is situated 10.7 mi (17.2 km) west of Charing Cross and had a population of 69,857 as of 2011. It is generally divided in three parts: the mostly residential area around Lady Margaret Road (Dormers Wells); the main commercial centre at High Street and Southall Broadway (part of the greater Uxbridge Road); and Old Southall/Southall Green to the south consisting of Southall railway station, industries and Norwood Green bounded by the M4.

It was historically a municipal borough of Middlesex administered from Southall Town Hall until 1965. Southall is located on the Grand Union Canal (formerly the Grand Junction Canal) which first linked London with the rest of the growing canal system. It was one of the last canals to carry significant commercial traffic (through the 1950s) and is still open to traffic and is used by pleasure craft. The canal separates it from Hayes on the west, whereas to the east the River Brent separates the town from Hanwell.

From the 1950s the town's local factories and proximity to Heathrow Airport attracted large numbers of Asian immigrants. This town is known for its diverse communities, and some parts of the town eventually became home to the largest Punjabi community outside the Indian subcontinent which become a major centre of South Asian culture, and sometimes known as known as an example of a Little India.

== Toponymy ==
Southall appears as Suhaull in 1198, and Sudhale in 1204, and as Southold on the Oxfordshire Sheldon tapestry from the late 1580s.

== History ==
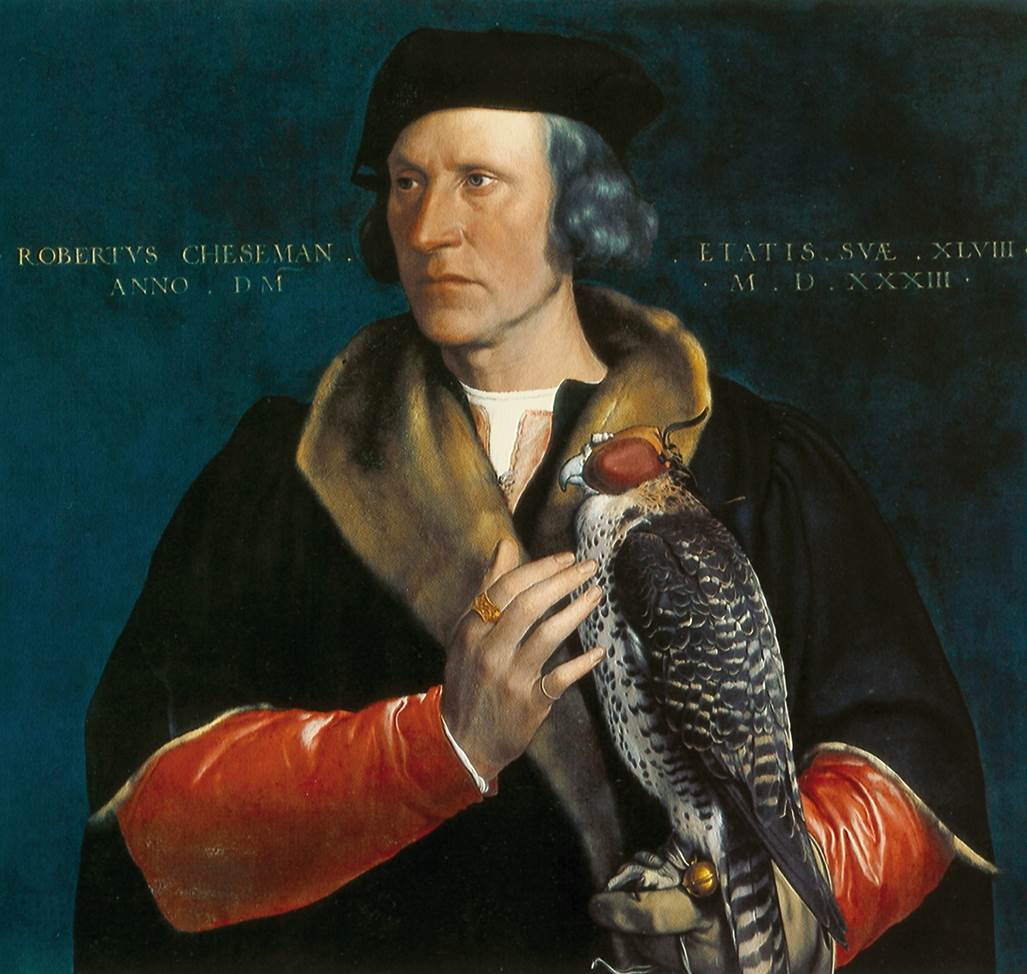
Robert Cheeseman, an English politician, held the manor of Southall from 1510 to 1547

Southall formed part of the chapelry of Norwood in the ancient parish of Hayes, in the Elthorne hundred of the historic county of Middlesex. For Poor Law it was grouped into the Uxbridge Union and was within Uxbridge Rural Sanitary District from 1875. The chapelry of Norwood had functioned as a separate parish since the Middle Ages. On 16 January 1891 the parish adopted the Local Government Act 1858 and the Southall Norwood Local Government District was formed. In 1894 it became the Southall Norwood Urban District. In 1936 the urban district was granted a charter of incorporation and became a municipal borough, renamed Southall. In 1965, the former area of the borough was merged with that of the boroughs of Ealing and Acton to form the London Borough of Ealing in Greater London.

The southern part of Southall (roughly south of the railway) used to be known as either Old Southall or Southall Green (and a section of the main north–south road in the area is still called The Green) and was centered on the historic Grade II*listed Tudor-styled Manor House which dates back to at least 1587. A building survey has shown much of the building is original, dating back to the days when Southall Green was becoming a quiet rural village. Minor 19th and 20th-century additions exist in some areas. It is currently used as serviced offices.

The southernmost part of Southall is known as Norwood Green. It has few industries and is mainly a residential area, having remained for many years mainly agricultural whilst the rest of Southall developed industrially. Norwood Green borders, and part is inside, the London Borough of Hounslow.

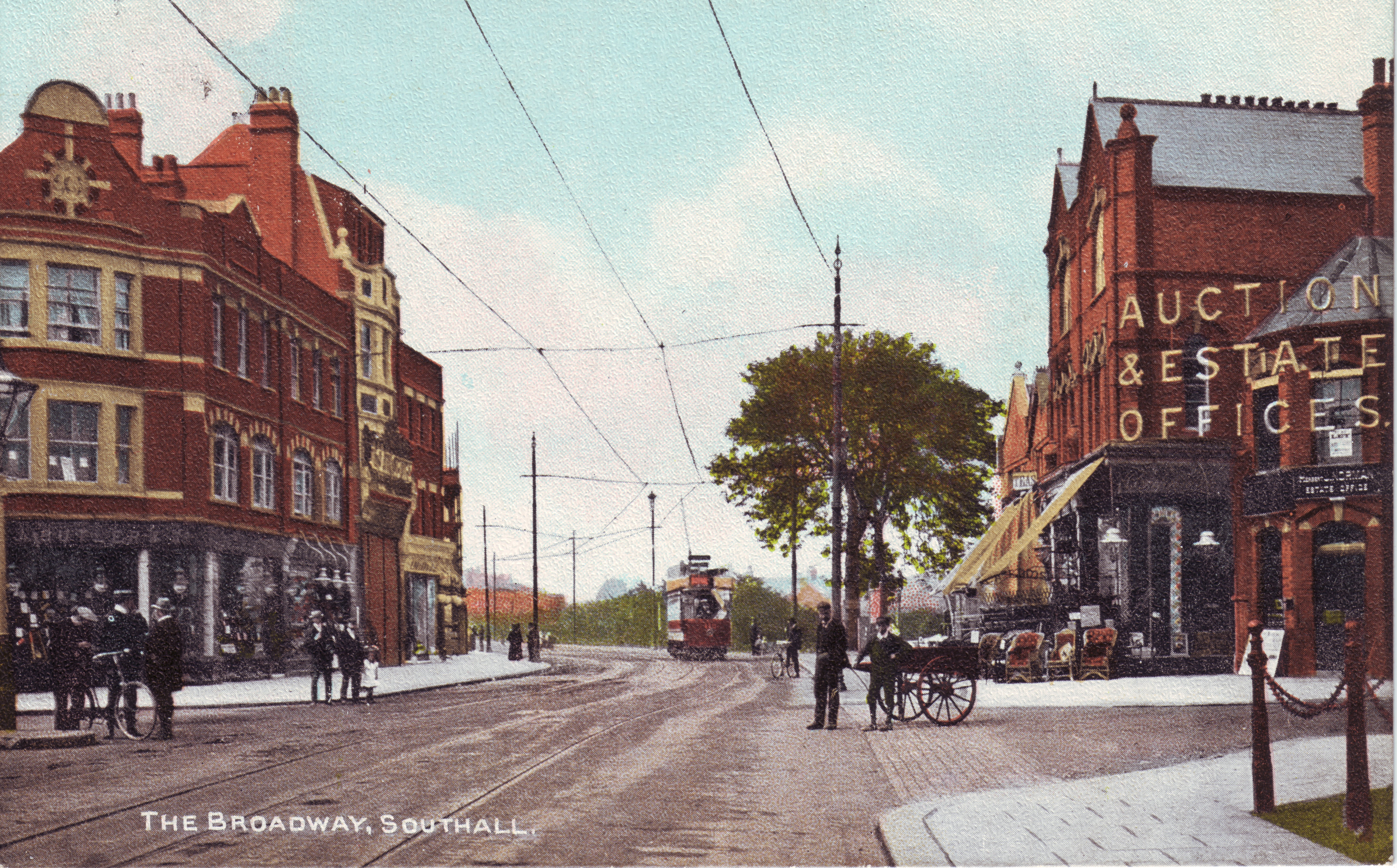
A tram from Hayes in the Broadway c. 1905

The main east west road through the town is Uxbridge Road (A4020), though the name changes in the main shopping area to The Broadway and for an even shorter section to High Street. Uxbridge Road was part of the main London to Oxford stagecoach route for many years and remained the main route to Oxford until the building of the Western Avenue highway to the north of Southall in the first half of the 20th century. First horse drawn, then electric trams (until 1936) and, then, electric trolleybuses, gave Southall residents and workers quick and convenient transport along Uxbridge Road in the first half of the 20th century before they were replaced by standard diesel-engined buses in 1960.

=== 19th century ===
The opening of the Grand Junction Canal (later renamed Grand Union Canal) as the major freight transport route between London and Birmingham in 1796 began a commercial boom, intensified by the arrival of Brunel's Great Western Railway in 1839, leading to the establishment and growth of brick factories, flour mills and chemical plants which formed the town's commercial base. In 1877, the Martin Brothers set up a ceramics factory in an old soap works next to the canal and until 1923, produced distinctive ceramics now known and collected as Martinware.

A branch railway line from Southall railway station to the Brentford Dock on the Thames was also built by Isambard Kingdom Brunel in 1856. It features one of his (impressive for the period) engineering works, the Three Bridges (although it is still often referred to on maps by the original canal crossing name of Windmill Bridge). where Windmill Lane, the railway and the Grand Union Canal all intersect – the canal being carried over the railway line cutting below in a cast-iron trough and a new cast-iron road-bridge going over both. Brunel died shortly after its completion. Sections of his bell-section rail can still be seen on the southern side being used as both fencing posts and a rope rail directly under the road bridge itself. It is listed as a Scheduled Ancient Monument. The other notable local construction by Brunel is the Wharncliffe Viaduct which carries the Great Western Railway across the River Brent towards London and which was Brunel's first major structural design.

Otto Monsted, a Danish margarine manufacturer, built a large factory at Southall in 1894. The factory was called the Maypole Dairy, and eventually grew to become one of the largest margarine manufacturing plants in the world, occupying a 28 ha (69 acres) site at its peak. The factory also had its own railway sidings and branch canal. The Maypole Dairy Company site was later acquired by Lever Brothers who, as part of the multinational Unilever company, converted the site to a Wall's Sausages factory which produced sausages and other meat products through until the late 1980s.

=== 20th century ===
At the beginning of the twentieth century, the old parish church of Southall, St John's, which had been rebuilt in 1837–8, was found to be too small for its congregation and, as a result, emigrated to a new building in Church Avenue, which was completed in 1910. The original church building, in Western Road, is now a youth centre.

In the 1920s and 1930s Southall was the destination of many Welsh people escaping from the harsh economic conditions in that part of the country. For many years, Welsh accents were very commonplace in the area.

On the eastern boundary of Southall was the Hanwell Asylum, which was once the world's largest asylum for the mentally ill. It was considered in its day to be a progressive institution with a good success rate for treatment. As attitudes to and treatment for mental illness improved, the site was renamed St. Bernard's Hospital. In the late 1970s, the site was extensively redeveloped, with most of the area now taken up by the Ealing Hospital. St. Bernard's still operates a large facility on part of the site under the West London Mental Health (NHS) Trust.

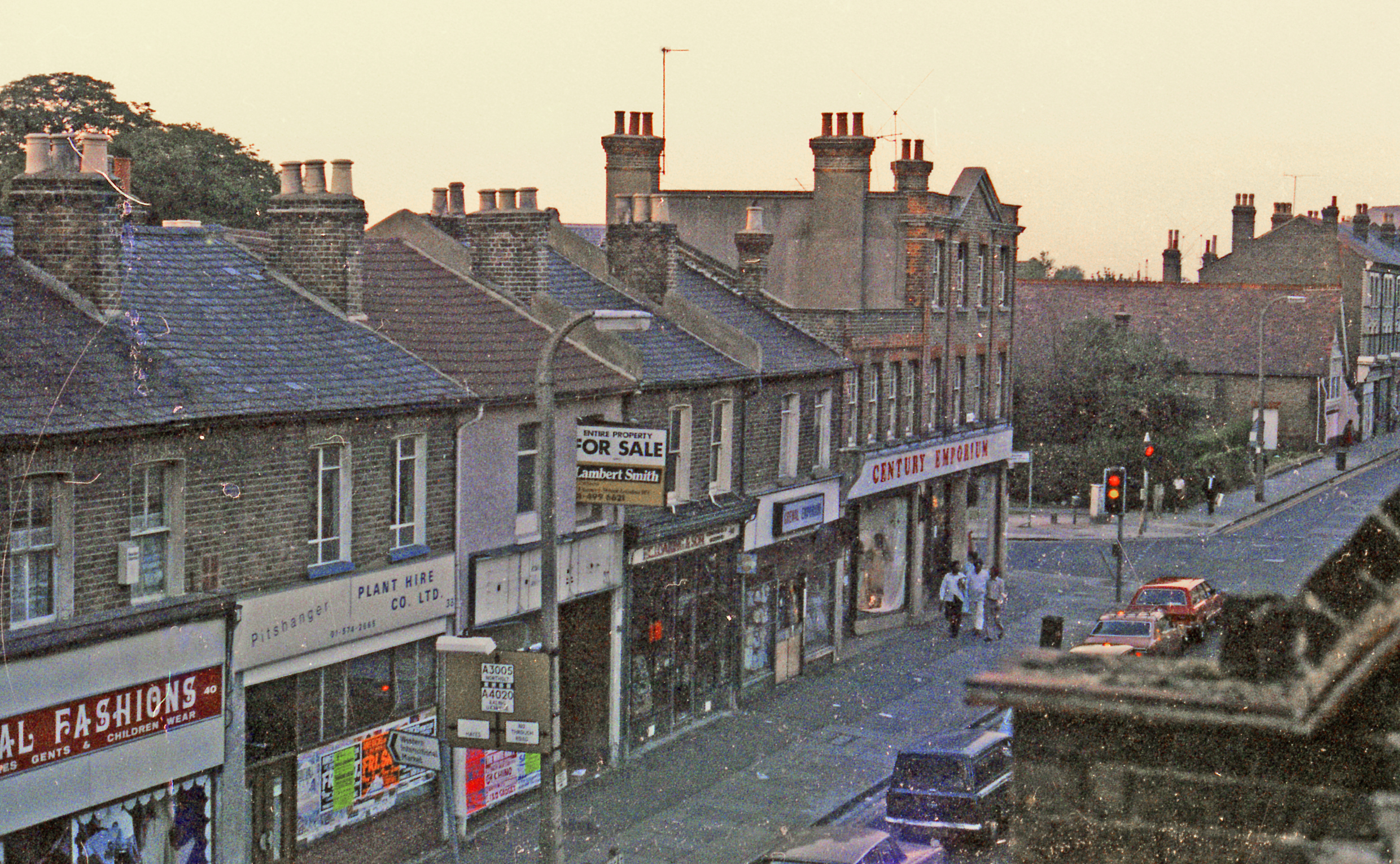
King Street, Southall, 1981

During World War II Southall was the target of enemy bombing on a number of occasions. A German V-1 flying bomb destroyed a number of houses in Regina Road, killing the occupants. Bomb shelters and bunkers were built during the war, close to or under most schools and public buildings, and in gardens of numerous private homes. The bunkers at Hamborough Primary School were expanded during the Cold War, to become the North West Group War HQ for the London area Civil Defence organisation and the London Borough of Ealing Emergency Control Centre. This facility is now disused.

In 1950, the first group of South Asians arrived in Southall, reputedly recruited to work in a local factory owned by a former British Indian Army officer. This South Asian population grew, due to the closeness of expanding employment opportunities such as Heathrow Airport. The most significant cultural group to settle in Southall are Asians. According to the Commission for Racial Equality, over 55% of Southall's population of 70,000 is Indian. By 1976 two-thirds of children in Southall were non-white, and in 1982 it was reported 65% of Southall's 83,000 residents were of Asian origin.

Southall was also the home of the last remaining horse market in London, selling goats, pigs, harness, and horse vehicles as well working horses. The market closed in 2007 after 100 years.

==== Accidents and racial tensions ====
On 2 September 1958 at 7:10 am, a pilot of a Vickers VC.1 Viking V624 (G-AIJE), which had just taken off from Heathrow Airport, reported that he had engine trouble. Some minutes later it crashed into a row of houses in Kelvin Gardens. It was on a cargo flight carrying aero engines to Tel Aviv and carried no passengers; however, the three crew members and four people on the ground were killed. One of the surviving occupants, 14-year-old Brian Gibbons, was later awarded the George Medal for bravery for saving his nephew from the subsequent fires, as well as the Carnegie Award. The accident was due to poor maintenance, and caused the company, Independent Air Travel, to fail in October 1959.

The 1970s saw racial tensions in the area; in 1976 Sikh teenager Gurdip Singh Chaggar was killed in a racist attack. On 23 April 1979, Blair Peach, a teacher and anti-racist activist, was killed after being knocked unconscious during a protest against the National Front (NF). Another demonstrator, Clarence Baker – a singer of the reggae band Misty in Roots, remained in a coma for five months. More than 40 others – including 21 police – were injured, and 300 were arrested.

On 4 July 1981, a race riot was sparked at the Hambrough Tavern on the Broadway. Local Asian youths mistakenly believed that a concert featuring the Oi! bands The Business, The Last Resort and The 4-Skins was a white power event. Additionally, the venue had recently been sued for barring non-white customers, and local youths had heard that skinheads arriving for the concert had harassed other youths and women. More than 200 skinheads had travelled by bus from East London, and a few of them smashed shop windows, wrote NF slogans around the area, and shouted neo-Nazi slogans while using bricks and clubs to attack Asian youths who had gathered in opposition to the gig. This was one of several high-profile riots in Britain that year. Although some of the skinheads were NF or British Movement supporters, among the 500 or so concert-goers were also left-wing skinheads, black skinheads, punk rockers, rockabillies and non-affiliated youths. Some of the approximately 400 Asians threw petrol bombs and other objects, and five hours of rioting left 120 people injured – including 60 police officers – and the tavern burnt down.

The Southall rail crash occurred on 19 September 1997 when a First Great Western mainline high speed express train from Swansea to London Paddington ran a red signal, when the driver's attention was distracted, and it collided with a goods train just outside Southall railway station. Seven people died and 139 were injured.

==== Economic history ====
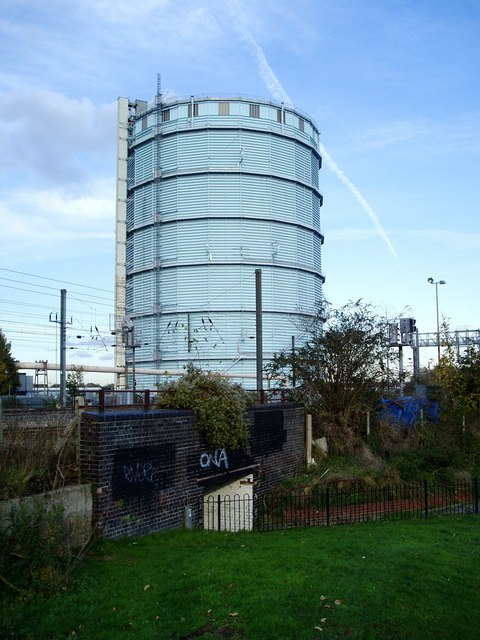
The former gasholder at Southall Gas Works

The Quaker Oats Company built a factory in Southall in 1936. Part of the operation that made pet foods was sold to Spiller's in 1994, and the remainder to Big Bear Group in 2006. The site continues to produce brands such as Honey Monster Puffs. Other engineering, paint and food processing factories prospered for many years, mostly alongside the railway and/or canal. A collection of Martinware – salt-glazed stoneware, and birds – is on display at Southall Library.

Southall was the home of Southall Studios, one of the earliest British film studios. It played a historic role in film-making from its creation in 1924 to its closure in 1959. In 1936, a fire destroyed the studio but it was rebuilt and enlarged. Numerous feature films (many featuring famous or later-to-be-famous actors) and the early TV series Colonel March of Scotland Yard were made at the studios, as were TV and cinema adverts.

There has been a locomotive works at the Southall Depot for nearly 150 years. Originally a Great Western Railway shed, it was possibly the last London steam depot, outlasting Old Oak Common and Stewarts Lane depots. The shed was accessible from the footbridge, spanning the whole set of lines, situated just off the Eastern end of the platforms. The depot was later used for DMU maintenance and as a base for the electrification programme. Currently the site, now referred to as the Southall Railway Centre, is used by two independent groups; Locomotive Services Limited and West Coast Railways.

Bus and commercial vehicle manufacturer Associated Equipment Company (AEC) was based in Southall, on a 25 ha (62 acres) triangular site between Windmill Lane, the Great Western Main Line and the branch to Brentford Dock. The company moved there from Walthamstow in 1926 and closed in 1979 after losing market share whilst part of the giant but inefficient British Leyland group. The site was noticeable to railway passengers and to motorists on Uxbridge Road due to large signs proclaiming "AEC – Builders of London's Buses for 50 years".

A major gas works manufacturing town gas was located between the railway and the canal. In 1932 a large gasholder was built, becoming a local landmark until its demolition in 2019. Painted on the north east side of the gasholder are the large letters 'LH' and an arrow to assist pilots locate Heathrow Airport's (now closed) runway 23 when making visual approaches. The letters were painted in the mid-1960s after a number of pilots became confused between Heathrow and the nearby RAF Northolt (which has a similar, though smaller, gasholder under its approach at Harrow). Northolt has a much shorter runway and is not suitable for very large aircraft although one Boeing 707 did land at Northolt by mistake and a number of other aircraft had to be warned off by air traffic control at the last minute. Since town gas production ceased in the 1970s with the arrival of natural gas piped from the North Sea, much of the 36 ha (89 acres) site has been vacant, due to limited road access and remaining gas infrastructure.

== Culture ==
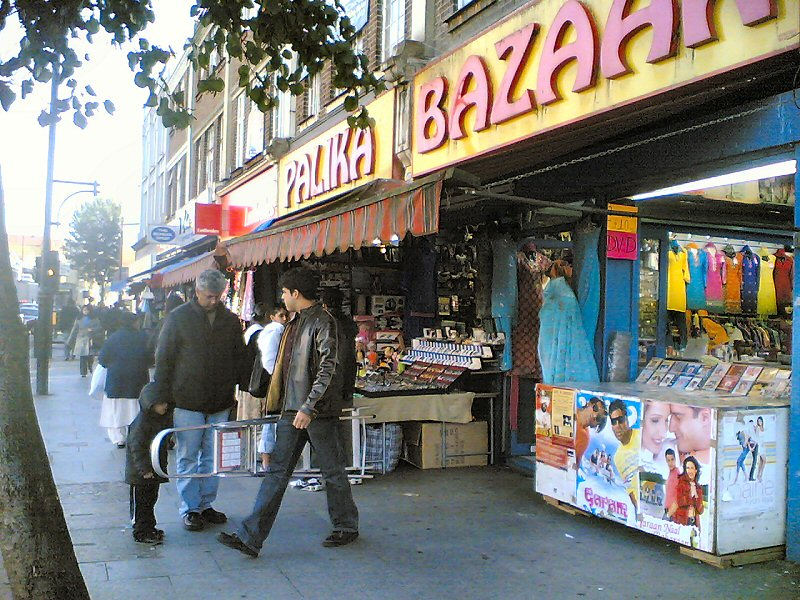
A shop in Southall Broadway, November 2005

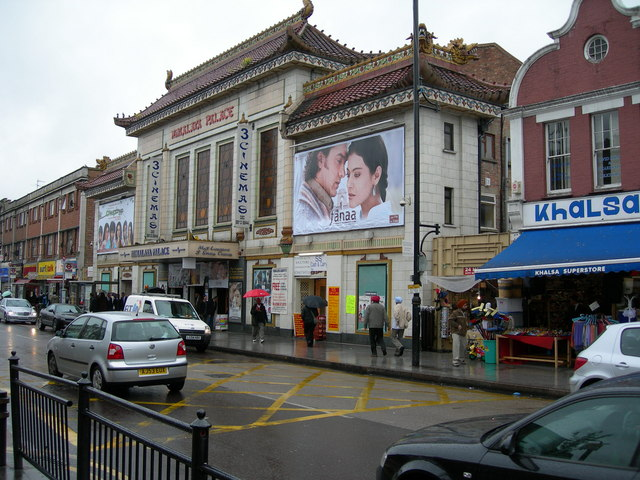
South Road, Southall

Since the end of World War II, Southall has become largely a South Asian residential district, sometimes known as "Little India".

In addition, the signs on the main railway station are bilingual in English and Gurmukhi, which is one of the written scripts of Punjabi. The main street in Southall is called The Broadway, while a smaller commercial area exists in Old Southall on King Street. Southall contains one of the largest South Asian shopping areas in the region, comparable to Green Street, East London or Ealing Road, Wembley.

Southall is home to London's largest Sikh community. There are ten Sikh Gurdwaras in Southall. The Gurdwara Sri Guru Singh Sabha, which opened in 2003, is one of the largest Sikh gurdwaras outside India, and it won the Ealing Civic Society Architectural Award in 2003. There are two large Hindu 'Mandir' temples, the Vishnu Hindu Mandir on Lady Margaret Road and the Ram Mandir in Old Southall.

There are more than ten Christian churches including 5 Anglican, one Roman Catholic (St Anselm's Church), Baptist, Methodist and several Pentecostal or Independent.

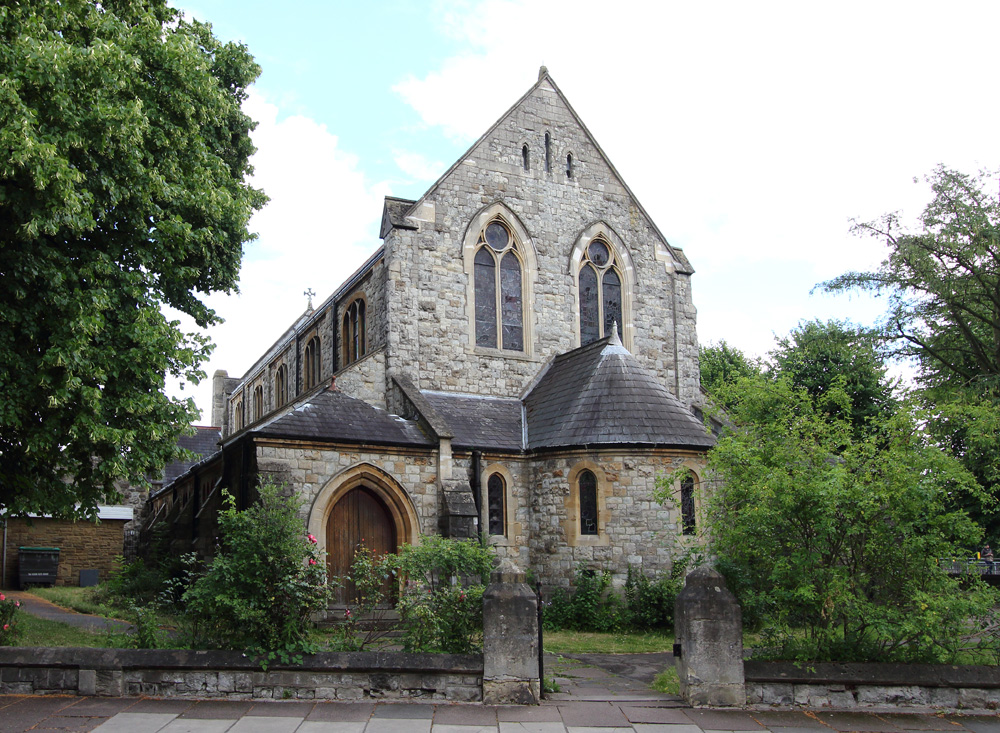
Holy Trinity Anglican church on Uxbridge Road.

There are six mosques in Southall, the Abubakr Mosque situated on Southall Broadway, the Central Jamia Masjid Mosque situated on Montague Waye, which is the oldest, the Jamia Masjid Islamic Centre on Townsend Road, the Red Sea Mosque in the Green, and Dar al Salam on Norwood Road and also the Baithul Mukaram mosque near Lidl.

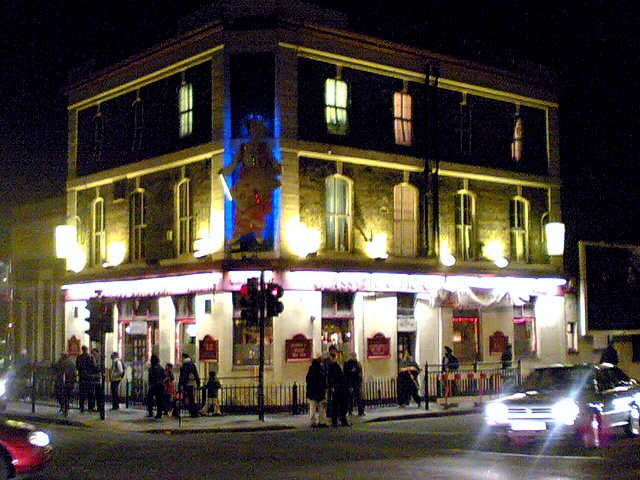
Glassy Junction pub, November 2005

The Tudor Rose, Southall is a nightclub and venue that caters for the local British African-Caribbean community. It opened as a cinema in 1910 and was converted to its current premises in 1983.

Southall was also the location of Glassy Junction public house, which was the first pub in the UK to accept Indian rupees as payment. Glassy Junction closed down in 2011 and has since been replaced by international South Indian restaurant chain, Saravana Bhavan.

Other notable local pubs include The Three Horseshoes in Southall Broadway, by the architect Nowell Parr which closed in 2017.

=== Media ===
There are two local community radio stations servicing Southall; Westside 89.6 FM, licensed by Ofcom as part of their drive towards community-based radio services, broadcasts urban music and was formerly based in Southall (now in Hanwell), and Desi Radio which predominantly broadcasts in Punjabi and is available throughout West London on 1602 AM and on DAB across Greater London. Sunrise Radio, broadcasting for the wider Asian community nationally, was until recently based in Southall now having moved to nearby Hounslow.

Some non-English newspapers for the community in Southall are also in circulation including Des Pardes, a Punjabi-language paper. A writer of Des Pardes, Tarsem Singh Purewal was killed in Southall in 1995.

Religion in Southall (2021)
1. Sikhism (28.5%)
2. Islam (24.1%)
3. Christianity (22.6%)
4. Hinduism (14.2%)
5. No Religion (5.20%)
6. Buddhism (0.40%)
7. Judaism (0.10%)
8. Other Religions (0.70%)
9. Religion Not Stated (4.20%)

=== In film and TV ===
Southall was the main location for the hit film Bend It Like Beckham and has appeared in Bollywood films as well, including Patiala House and Goal!.

A restaurant located in Southall, named "Brilliant Restaurant" has also been featured and nominated on Gordon Ramsay's show, Ramsay's Best Restaurant, as one of Ramsay's best. Gordon also mentioned he'd visited multiple times prior working with staff, aiming to obtain top knowledge on how to prepare and serve Indian food. King Charles III also named Brilliant as his favourite Indian restaurant.

=== Sport ===
The local football club Southall F.C. has a long history, having been formed in 1871 and nurtured past players such as Les Ferdinand, who went on to play for the national team. and as of 2018–19, they currently play in the Premier Division of the Combined Counties Football League.The local [cricket] club is London Tigers CC, who play at Spikes Bridge Park. Southall Park is home to a free weekly park run 5k event, which starts at 9am every Saturday.

== Demographics ==
Southall is religiously and ethnically diverse. In 1964 the total non-White population was estimated to be around 11.4%. In 2021, Sikhs made up 28.5% of the population, Muslims made up 24.1% and Christians 22.6%.

== Notable people ==
=== Musicians ===
- H Dhami, Bhangra singer.
- Ms Scandalous, rapper/MC, born in Southall in 1983.
- Juggy D, bhangra singer.
- Cleo Laine, jazz singer and actress, was born in Southall in 1927, brought up on Clarence Street, and attended Featherstone Road School.
- Misty in Roots, reggae band, formed in Southall in 1974.
- Jay Sean, R&B singer, was raised in Southall.
- Kuljit Bhamra, composer, record producer and musician is based in Southall.
- Ian D'Sa, guitarist of punk rock band Billy Talent.
- Ray Dorset, singer of British rock group Mungo Jerry.
- Gary Thain of the English rock band Uriah Heep's main residence was in a flat in Norwood Green, which is also where he died.

=== Writers ===
- Mike Ashley, author and editor.
- Kwame Kwei-Armah, playwright and actor.
- Rupinderpal Singh Dhillon, poet.
- Tim Lott, author born and raised in Southall. His debut The Scent of Dried Roses is about growing up there.
- Harjeet Atwal, author.
- Amarjit Chandan poet and translator.

=== Television and film ===
- Daljit Dhaliwal, newsreader and journalist.
- Nick Knowles, television personality.
- Joseph Marcell, American television personality ("Fresh Prince of Bel Air" and English theatre actor lived in Southall.
- Actress Hayley Mills lived at Friars Lawn, at Norwood Green, Southall, in the late 1970s to 1980.
- Gurinder Chadha, film director, the Southall area is the setting for many of her films involving the British Asian community.
- Stewart Bevan, actor, screenwriter, lyricist and poet grew up in Southall.
- Elisabeth Sladen, British actress known for playing Sarah Jane Smith in Doctor Who, lived in Southall.

=== Politicians ===
- Sir Leslie Murphy (1915–2007) was born in Southall.
- Syd Bidwell (1917–1997), was born and raised in Southall, and represented Southall in parliament from 1966 to 1992.

=== Others ===
- The Martin Brothers were pottery manufacturers, based on Havelock Road and several of the brothers were eventually buried in Havelock Cemetery.
- Harry Gordon Selfridge, the American retail magnate that founded the London based store Selfridges once lived in the Friars Lawn residence.
- Les Ferdinand, England footballer, once played for Southall FC.
- Paul Canoville, English footballer, first black player to play for Chelsea F.C.
- Brett Ewins, comic book artist.
- Trevor Baylis, the inventor of the Clockwork Radio grew up in the suburb.
- Carole Middleton, mother of Catherine, Princess of Wales spent her formative years on Clarence Street with her family and was educated at Featherstone Primary and High School.
- Kwame McKenzie, psychiatrist, professor and CEO of Wellesley Institute based in Toronto, Ontario.

== Local landmarks ==
- Wharncliffe Viaduct. An imposing structure 300 yd (270 m) and 65 ft (20 m) high. Situated the north side of Uxbridge Road on the boundary with Hanwell.
- Manor House, a historic building in Southall Green and one of the few Elizabethan manor houses still surviving.
- Southall Town Hall, a victorian municipal building on the High Street.
- Isambard Kingdom Brunel's Three Bridges
- Gurdwara Sri Guru Singh Sabha, the largest Sikh gurdwara (temple) found outside Asia.
- Warren Farm Nature Reserve, a vast rewilded meadow.
Landmarks of Southall
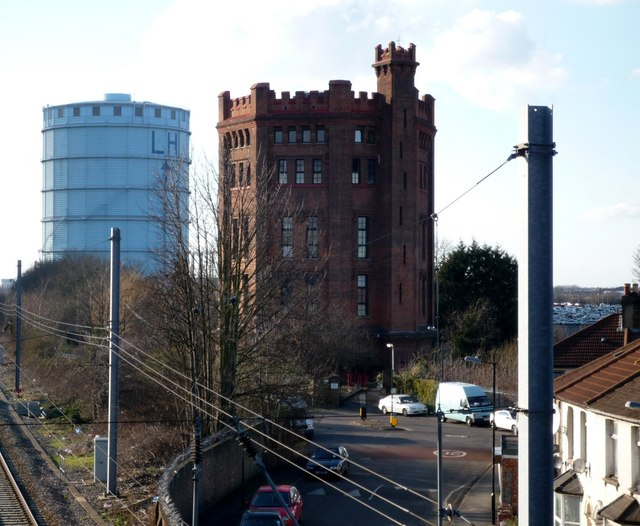
Redbrick water tower (which has now been converted into an apartment complex) alongside the former Southall gasometer

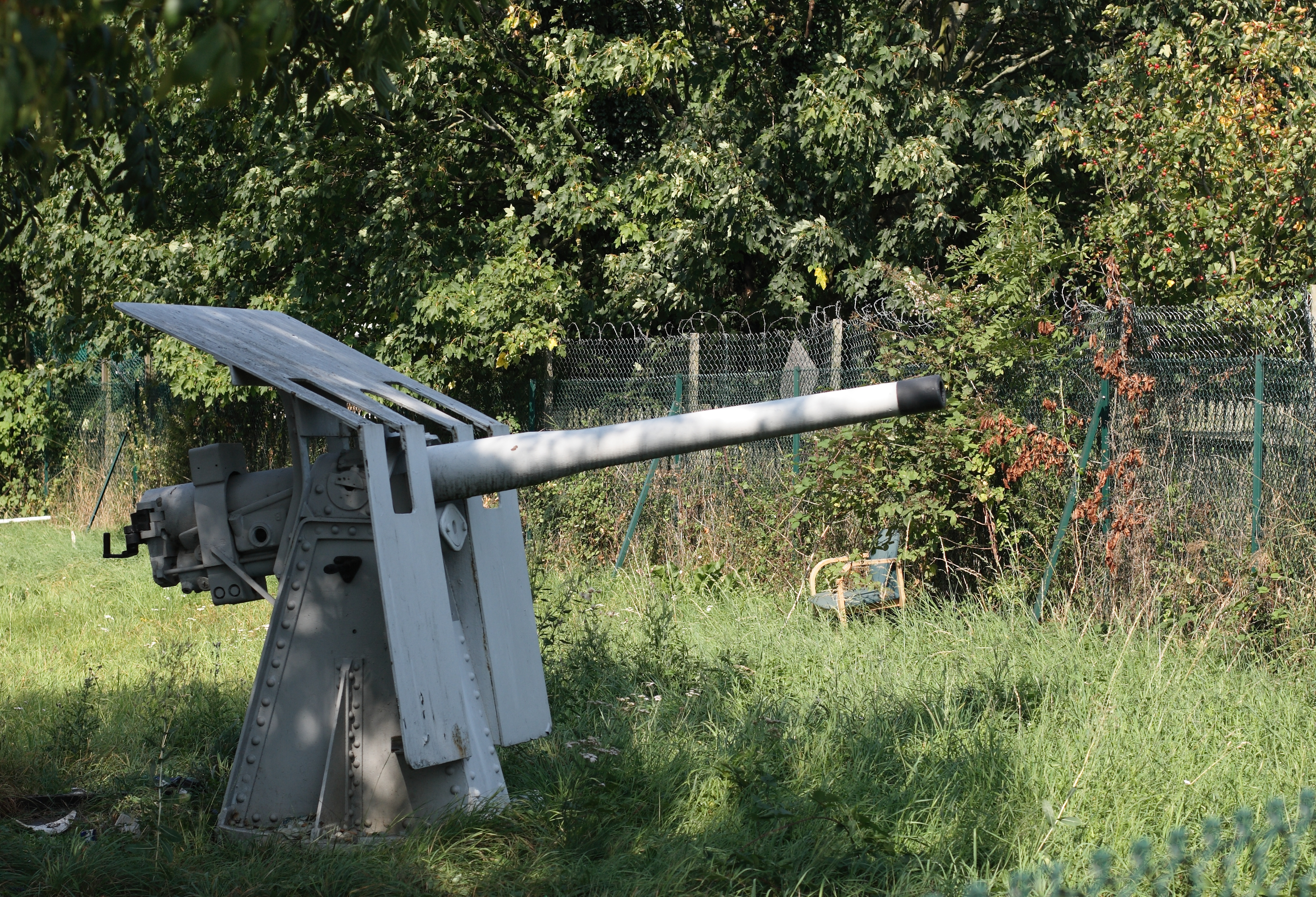
A naval gun that was at the Three Bridges, formerly part of the Outer London Defence Ring

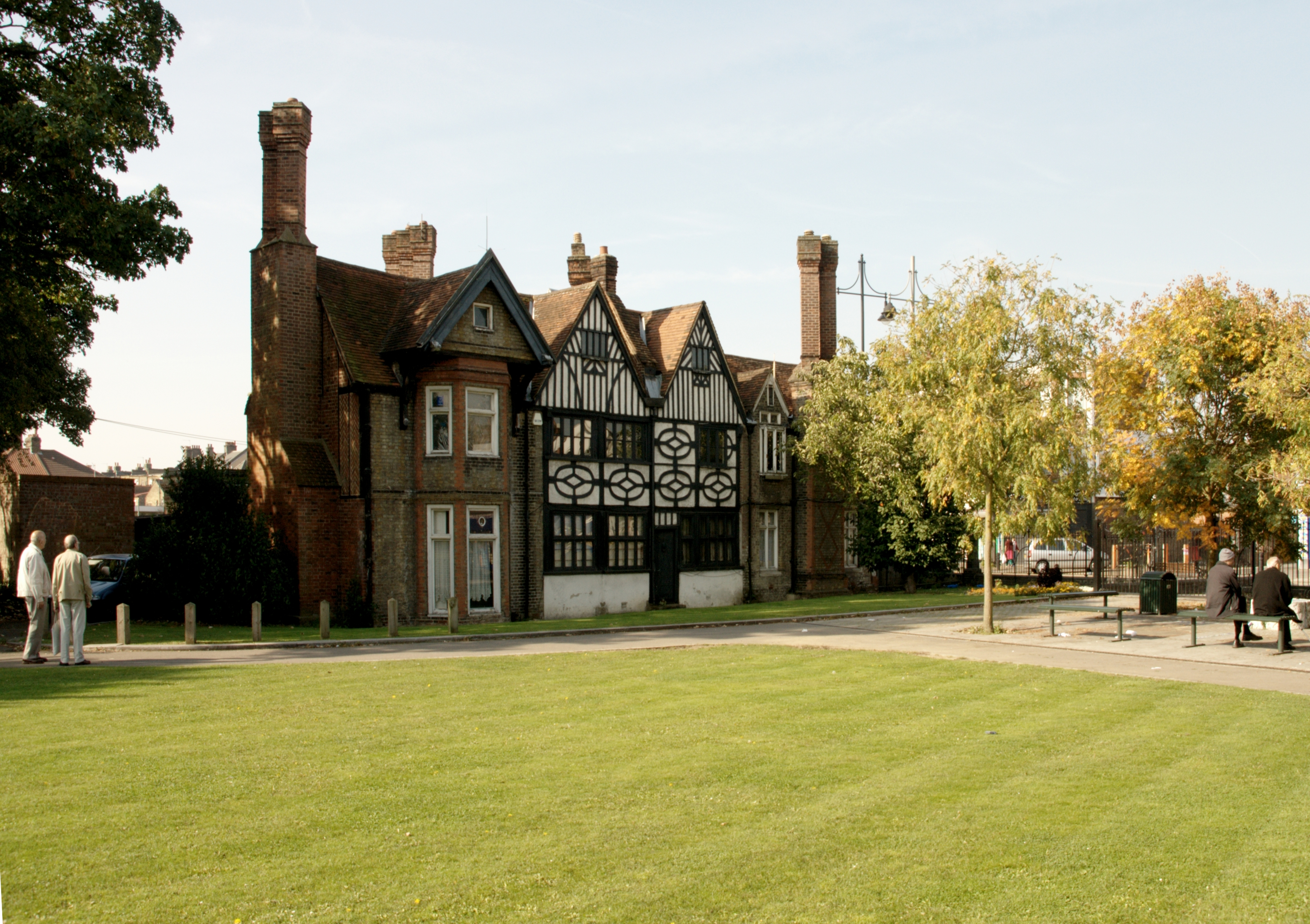
The Manor, Southall

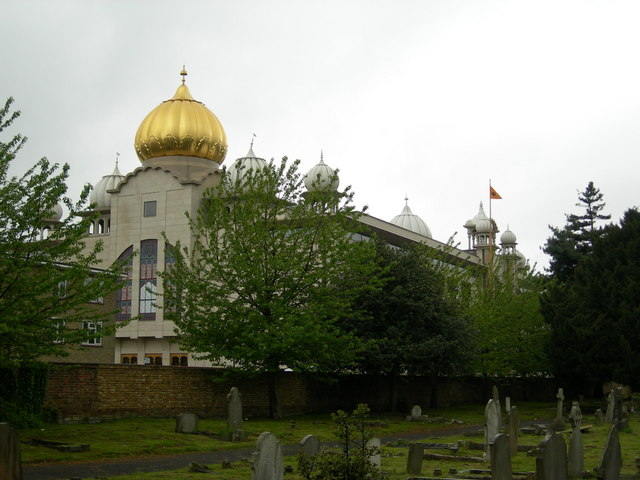
Sri Guru Singh Sabha Gurdwara

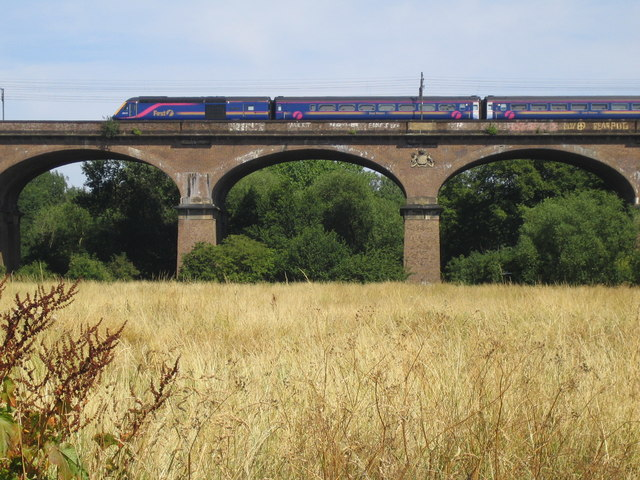
Wharncliffe Viaduct, viewed from the south side

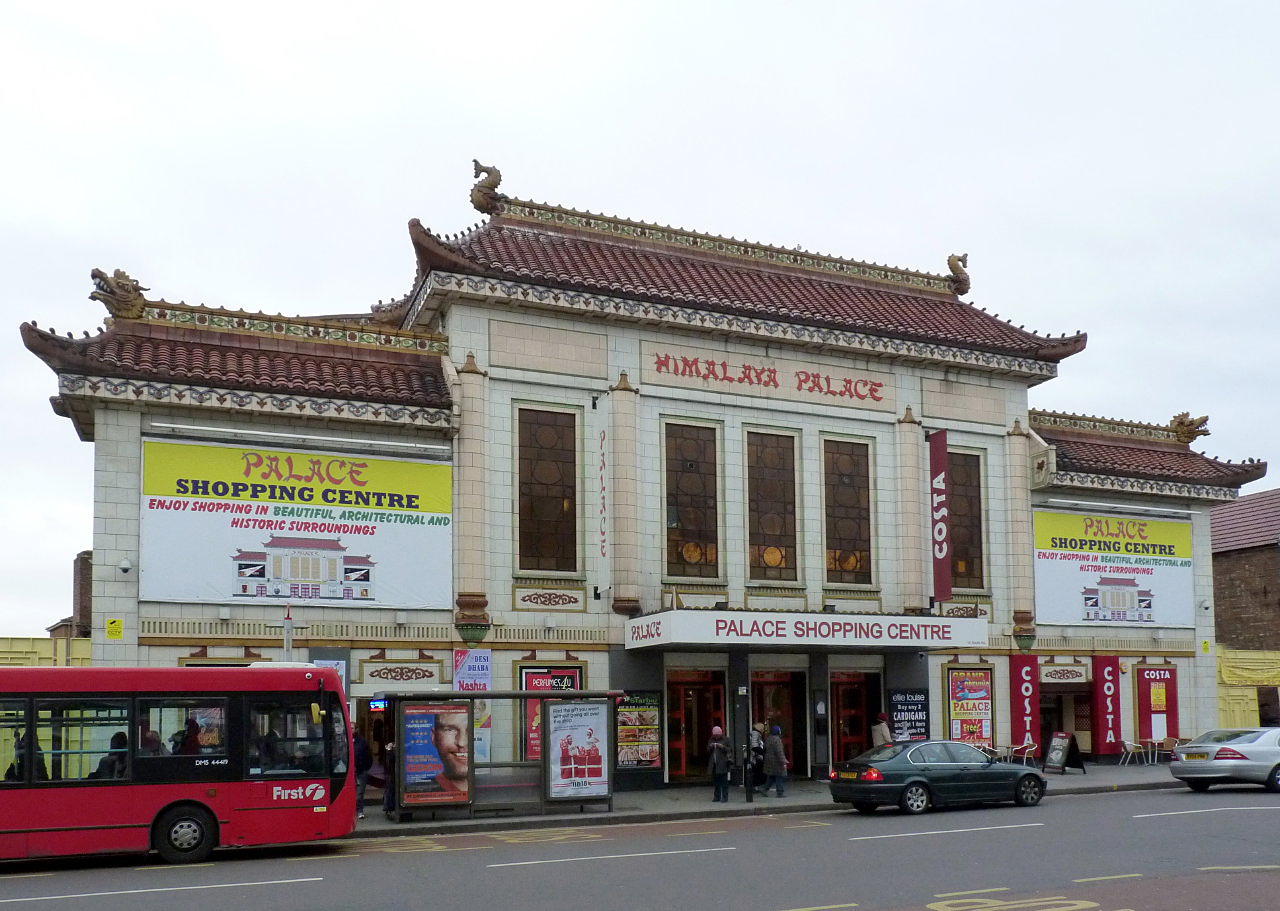
Palace Shopping Centre

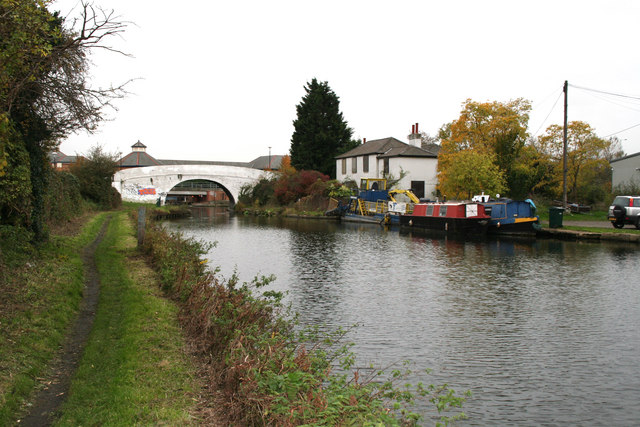
Bull's Bridge, Grand Union Canal (between Southall and Hayes)

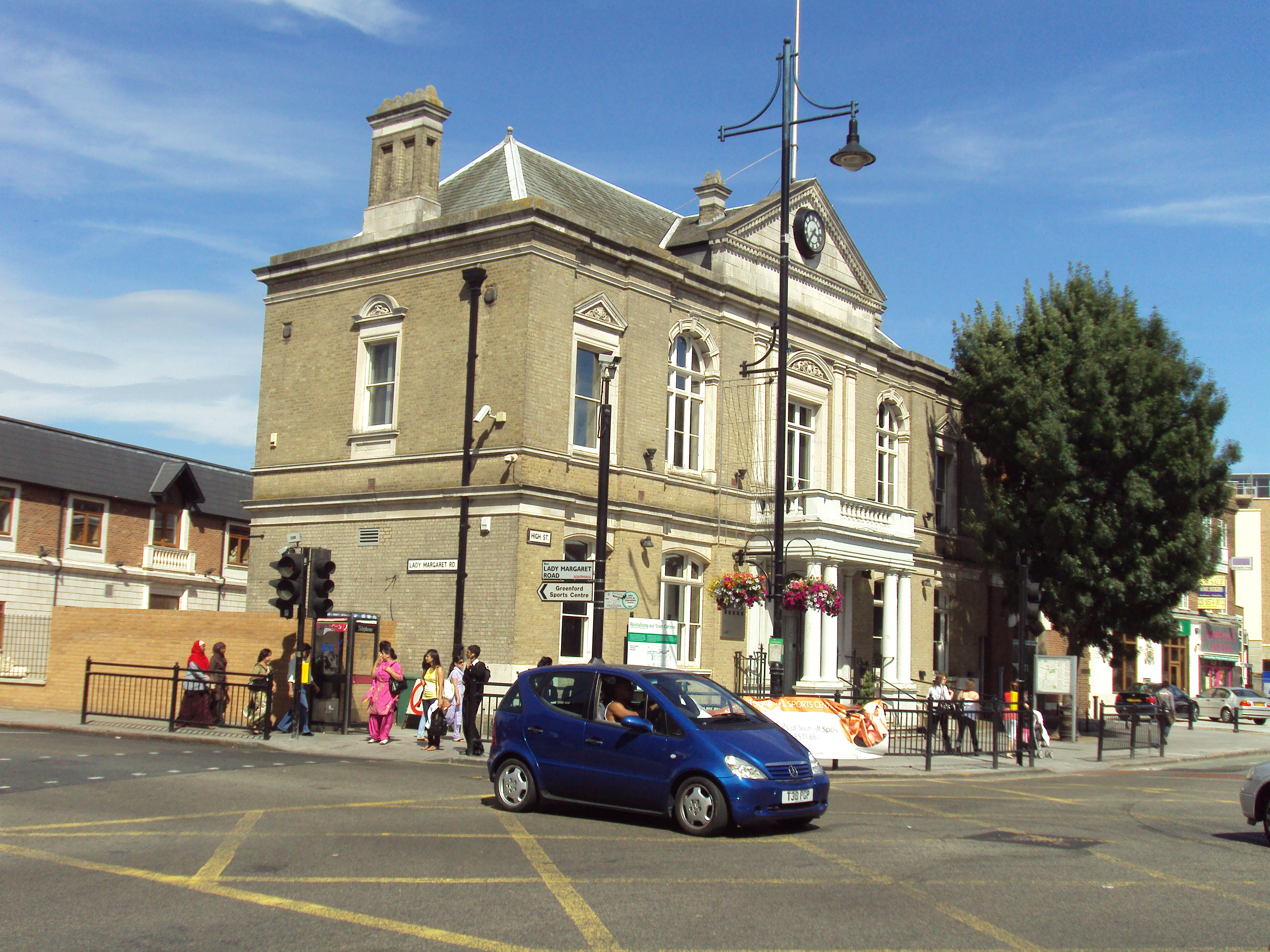
The old town hall

== Political representation ==
Southall is part of the parliamentary constituency of Ealing Southall, represented since 2024 by Labour Member of Parliament Deirdre Costigan.

Southall consists of six electoral wards for local council elections: Dormers Wells, Lady Margaret, Norwood Green, Southall Green, Southall Broadway and Southall West, which all elect councillors to Ealing Council.

Southall is in the London Assembly constituency of Ealing and Hillingdon which has been represented by assembly member Bassam Mahfouz of the Labour Party since 2024.

== Geography and transport ==
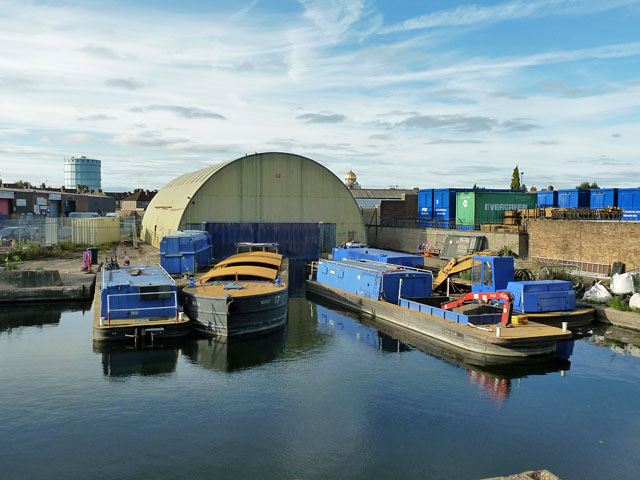
Docks at the Grand Union Canal in Southall

Nearby places include Hayes, Hanwell, Hounslow, Greenford, Northolt and Ealing The area is identified in the London Plan as one of 35 major centres in Greater London.

Southall is served by Southall railway station on the Great Western Main Line, providing links to and from Heathrow Airport, Reading and Oxford as well as London Paddington.

The nearest London Underground to the town centre is Osterley station, on the Piccadilly line, which is located approximately 2 mi (3.2 km) to the south.

Frequent bus services link Southall with all neighbouring suburbs and Heathrow Airport.

There is an express coach service between Southall, Leicester and Birmingham which specialises in serving the many family connections in both areas' South Asian populations.

=== Parks and recreational grounds ===
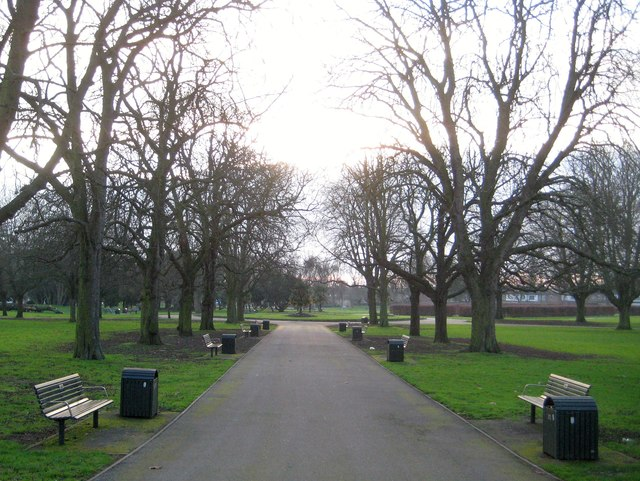
Southall Park mid winter

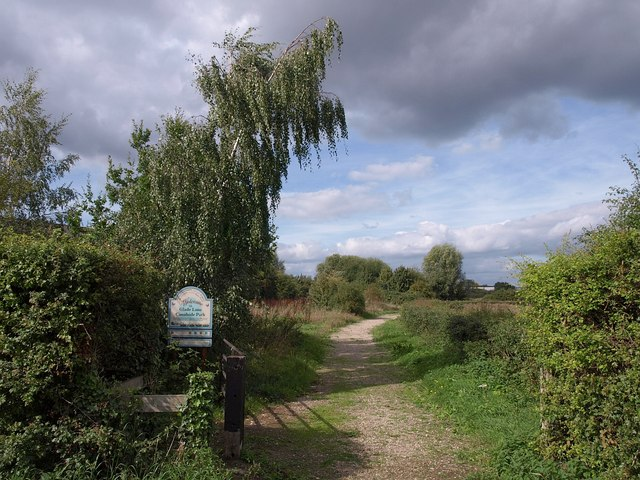
Glade Lane Canalside Park

There are several parks in Southall, the most notable being Southall Park. It is mainly recreational and has a playground, play centre, tennis court, and also has a shared multi use games areas with Villiers High School. Other features include a mosaic globe and a water cascade.

== Education ==
Secondary schools and colleges in Southall include:

- Villiers High School
- Dormers Wells High School
- Ealing, Hammersmith and West London College, a campus is located on Beaconsfield Road in Southall.
- Featherstone High School
- Ayesha Siddiqa Girls School, located in the Abu Bakr Mosque.
- Greenford High School, located on Lady Margaret Road.

Specialist schools include:

- Sybil Elgar School, which is the first Autism-specific school in the world. It first opened in Southall on Havelock Road and there is only one other off-shoot campus for post-16 edu. in Acton.

== See also ==
- Blair Peach, anti-racist campaigner who was killed in a demonstration in Southall on Monday 23 April 1979.
- Southall rail crash
