= Kwame McKenzie =

British-Canadian psychiatrist

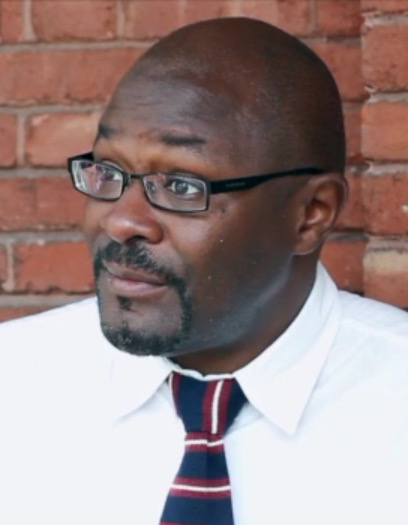
- McKenzie in 2013
- Born: Kwame Julius McKenzie; Southall, London, England
- Occupations: CEO, physician, professor

Academic background
- Education: Southampton University Medical School

Academic work
- Institutions: Wellesley Institute

Kwame Julius McKenzie is a British-Canadian psychiatrist employed as the CEO of Wellesley Institute, a policy think tank based in Toronto, Ontario, Canada. McKenzie is a full professor in the Department of Psychiatry at the University of Toronto. He has worked as physician, researcher, policy advisor, journalist and broadcaster.

== Biography ==
=== Early life and education ===
McKenzie was born in Southall, West London, England, to Vida Louise McKenzie and Arthur McKenzie, who had immigrated to the UK from the Caribbean in the late 1950s. He attended Villiers High School, London, and then Southampton University Medical School.

=== Career ===
McKenzie was appointed as the CEO of the Wellesley Institute in May 2014. He has worked a policy advisor across various levels of government, including provincial, federal and international.

==== Mental health and equity ====
He served as Chair of the Council of Canadian Academies’ panel on Mental Health and Medical Assistance in Dying, Chair of the Health Equity External Advisory Committee at Health Quality Ontario and was appointed Commissioner at the Ontario Human Rights Commission in June 2016.

He serves as a member of Employment and Social Development Canada's National Advisory Council on Poverty, and is a Co-chair of the Expert Task Force on Substance Misuse under Health Canada. He is the Medical Director of Health Equity at the Centre for Addiction and Mental Health (CAMH). He formerly sat on the Board of Directors of the Ontario Hospital Association, and on the Transition Planning Special Committee. He also serves on the Ontario Health Data Council for the Ontario Ministry of Health and Long-Term Care.

McKenzie was Chair of the Research and Evaluation Advisory Committee for the universal basic income pilot programme in Ontario in 2017. He has been a member of the board for United Way Toronto.

==== Globalization ====
McKenzie was a Canadian Delegate to the United Nations High-level Political Forum, the "central platform for follow-up and review of the 2030 Agenda for Sustainable Development and the Sustainable Development Goals". He is also a consultant with the World Health Organization on equity.

==== COVID-19 ====
McKenzie is a member of the Mental Health Working Group on the Ontario COVID-19 Science Advisory Table, and a member of the Expert Advisory Panel on COVID-19 and Mental Health at the Canadian Institutes of Health Research (CIHR).

He is also a member of the Minister of Health's COVID-19 Testing and Tracing Advisory panel alongside Kieran Moore, Chief Medical Officer of Health for Public Health Ontario. A report published by the panel in March 2021 concluded that among other factors, teachers' COVID-19 vaccination status must be taken into account when developing and implementing school-based SARS-CoV-2 testing and tracing policies.

== Media and activism ==
In addition to his academic, policy and clinical work, McKenzie has engaged in written media and radio programming.

McKenzie was also a presenter on the BBC Radio 4 programme All in the Mind, and has previously been a columnist for The Times and The Guardian newspapers in the UK, writing on issues of health, racism and equity, as well as being a frequent guest on Canadian radio and television.

In 2005, McKenzie wrote an article in The Times about racial stereotyping in the 2005 film King Kong, co-written, produced, and directed by Peter Jackson. In the piece titled "Big black and bad stereotyping", McKenzie described it as feeding "into all the colonial hysteria about Black hyper-sexuality". The article received such a strong response from readers that McKenzie and The Times issued a challenge asking the public to find positive Black images on television during the holiday season.

In December 2021, McKenzie wrote an opinion piece in the Toronto Star calling for a strategy to avert vaccine inequity in racialized children.

== Awards and recognition ==
- 2011: African Canadian Achievement Award for Science
- 2011: Dominican of Distinction Award
- 2015: Don Wasylenski Award for Global Health
- 2015: Fred Fallis Award for Excellence in Online Education
- 2017: CAMH 150 Difference Makers in Mental Health
- 2017: Honorary Diploma Liberal Arts – George Brown College
- 2018: Harry Jerome Trailblazer Award

== Published works ==
- Kidd, Madan, Rallabandi, Cole, Muskat, Raja, Wiljer, McKenzie. Social entrepreneurship and mental health in low- and middle-income countries. CAMH, Toronto, Canada 2016 ISBN 978-1-77114-329-5 (paperback) ISBN 978-1-77114-330-1 (pdf)
- Morgan, Fearon, McKenzie. Society and Psychosis. Cambridge University Press. 2008
- McKenzie K: Understanding Depression. British Medical Association and Family Doctor Publications 1998 reprinted 1999/ 2000/2001/2002/2003/2004/2005/2006/2009/2012
- McKenzie K: Understanding Anxiety. British Medical Association and Family Doctor Publication (2006)
- McKenzie K: "Social capital and mental illness". British Journal of Psychiatry (2002)
- McKenzie, Kwame, and Kamaldeep Bhui. "Better Mental Healthcare for Minority Ethnic Groups – Moving Away from the Blame Game and Putting Patients First: Commentary on … Institutional Racism in Psychiatry". Psychiatric Bulletin 31, no. 10 (2007): 368–69. https://doi.org/10.1192/pb.bp.107.017145.
