= St Mary's Church, Norwood Green =

Coordinates: 51.4952°N 0.3665°W

St Mary's Church
- St Mary the Virgin Church
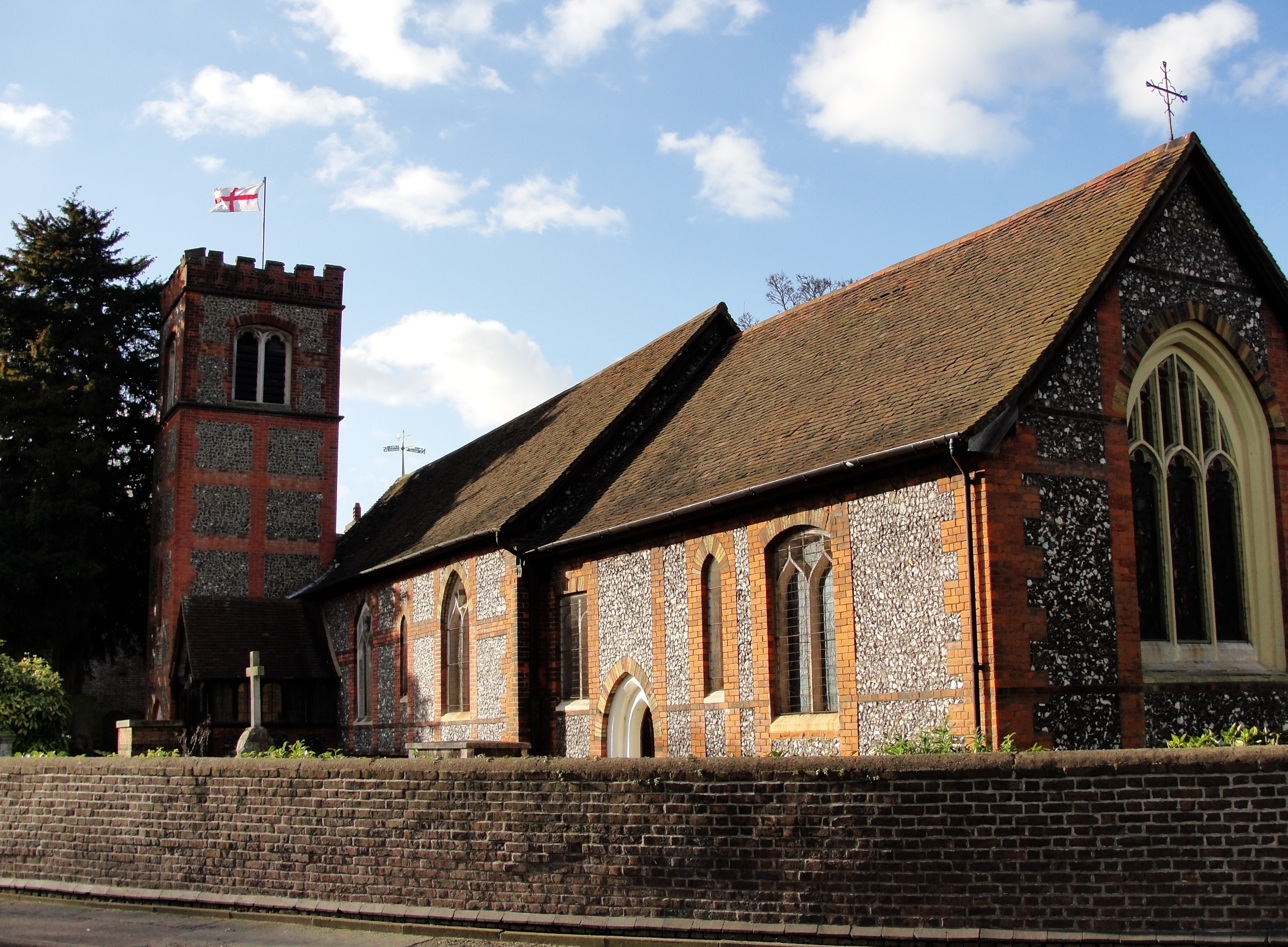
- St Mary's Church
- Location: Norwood Green
- Country: England
- Denomination: Anglican
- Website: stmarysnorwoodgreen.org.uk

History
- Status: Parish church
- Dedication: Virgin Mary
- Consecrated: 30 June 1852

Architecture
- Functional status: Active
- Heritage designation: Grade II*
- Designated: 8 November 1949
- Style: Gothic
- Groundbreaking: 12th century
- Completed: 1896

Administration
- Province: Canterbury
- Diocese: London
- Archdeaconry: Northolt
- Deanery: Ealing
- Parish: St Mary the Virgin

St Mary's Church or St Mary the Virgin Church is a Church of England parish church in Norwood Green, Borough of Ealing, London, England. Parts of the church were built in the 1100s, with much of it from the 1400s, and the tower was built in 1896. Architecturally, it was a Gothic church, now with Gothic Revival additions. It is located on Tentelow Lane, in the historic centre of Norwood Green. It is a Grade II* listed building.

== Building ==
It is recorded that there has been a chapel at the location of the church since the 1100s. The earliest parts of the building come from this time. The semicircular west arch and the north arcade were built in the 12th century. The windows in the south walls of the nave and chancel were built in the 13th century. Though the windows were later restored. There are two windows on the nave that were built in the 1300s. Around 1439, the chancel arch, the roof of the nave roof, the south doorway, the font and the south porch were all rebuilt. In 1612, a gallery was built. In 1638, a new pulpit was installed. In the 1800s, the church underwent multiple renovations. In 1824, the church was restored. In 1849, work was done on the north arcade. In 1864, more restoration work was done. In 1896, the tower was built, replacing a belfry and spire.

== Parish ==
From its inception until 1859, the church was a chapel of St Mary the Virgin Church in nearby Hayes, part of the estate of the Archbishop of Canterbury. In 1394, a priest was first recorded as being chaplain of Norwood Green. In 1656, a petition was made to make St Mary's its own parish church. The petition stated that the chapel was already carrying out its own duties. However, it was refused. In 1850, part of the parish, close to the church, was given over to St John's Church in Southall. In 1859, St Mary's became a parish church. In 1866, the parish priest was made a rector.

== Exterior ==
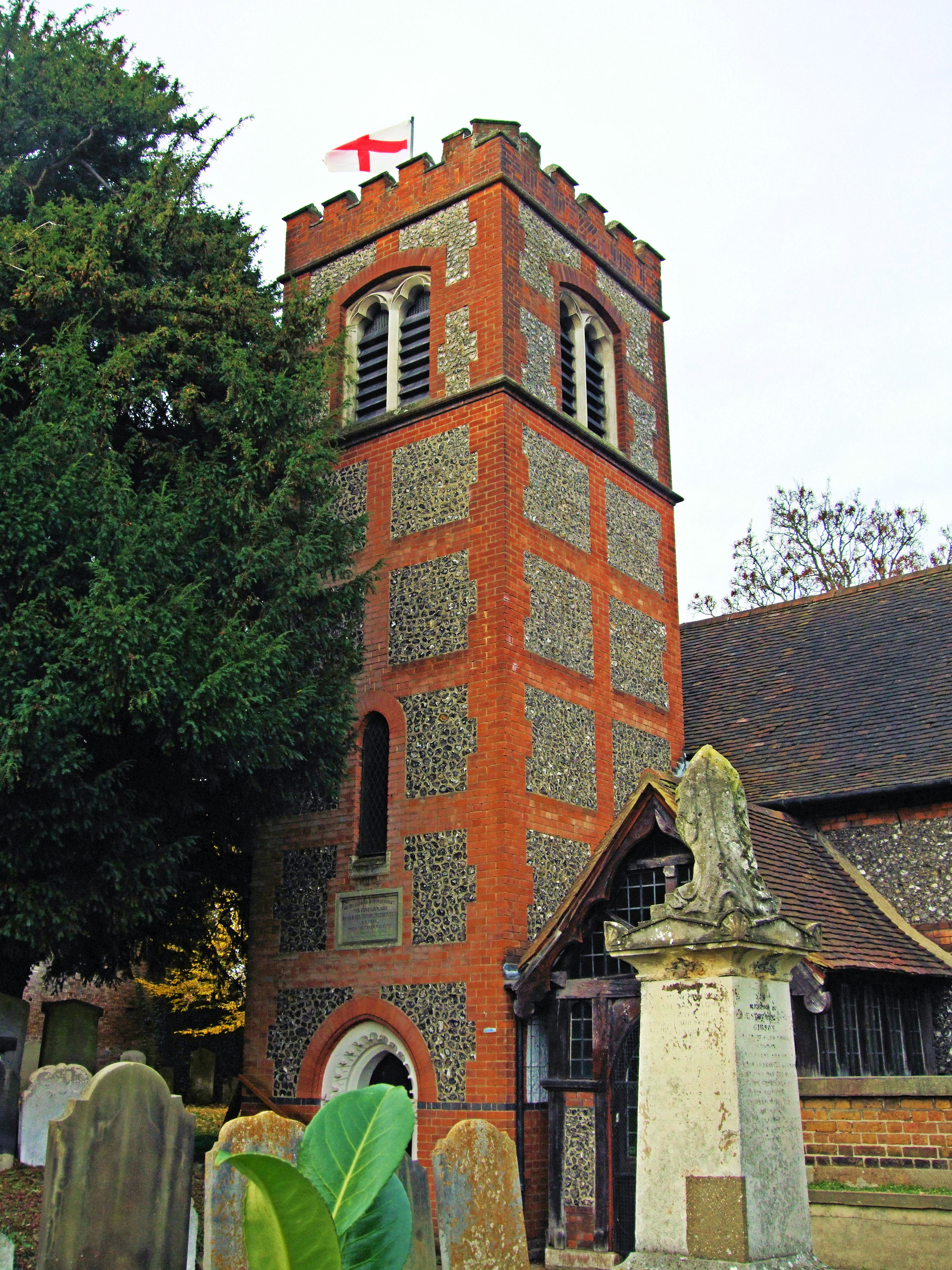
Tower

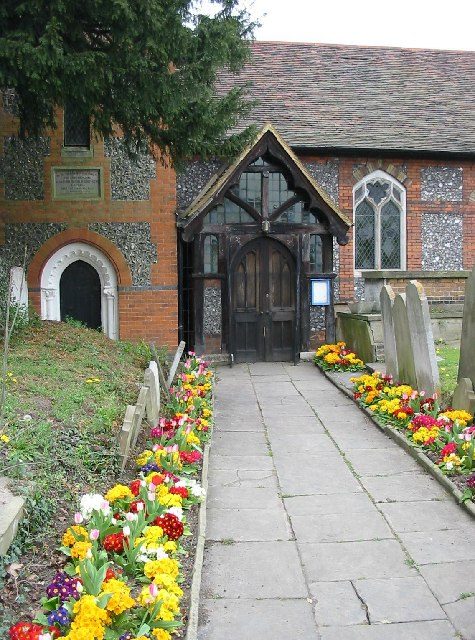
Entrance

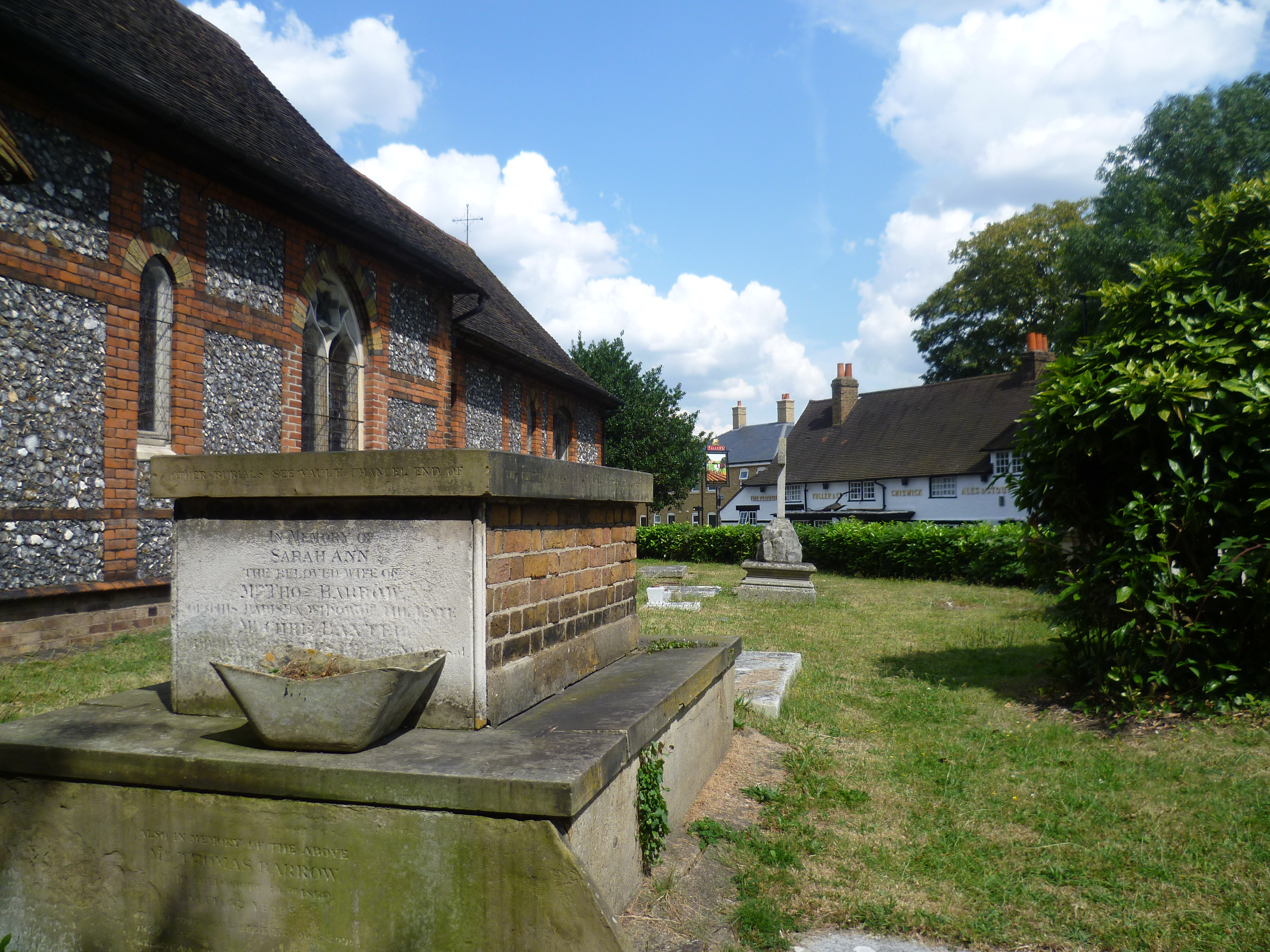
Churchyard

== Interior ==
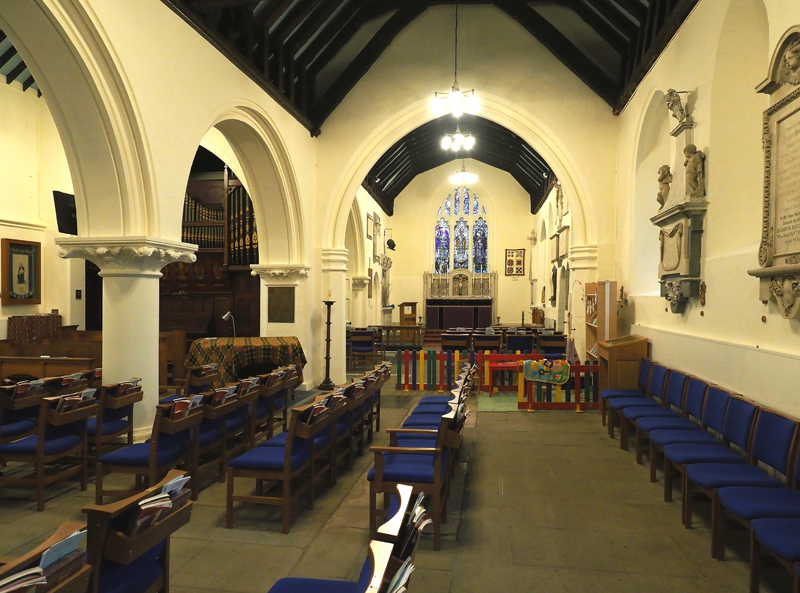
East end

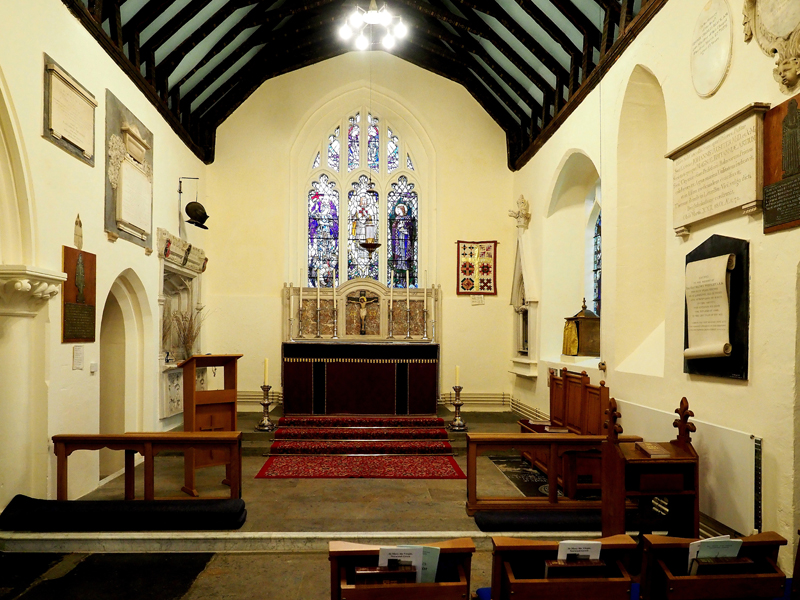
Chancel

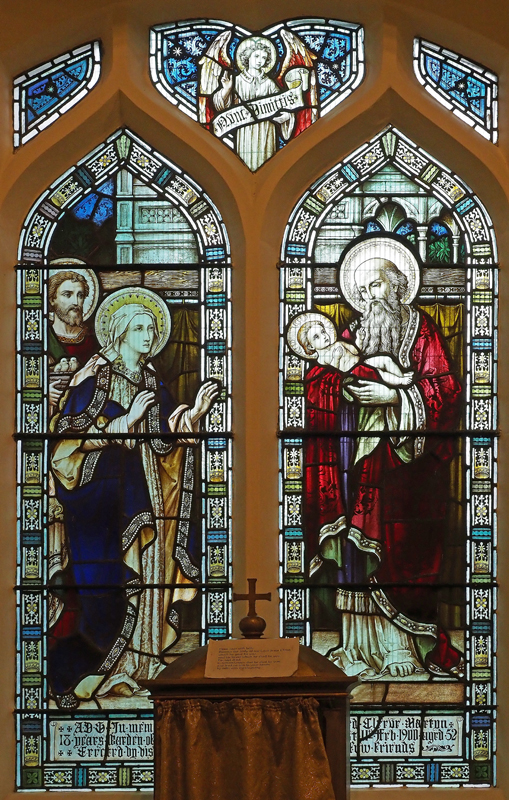
Presentation of Jesus stained glass

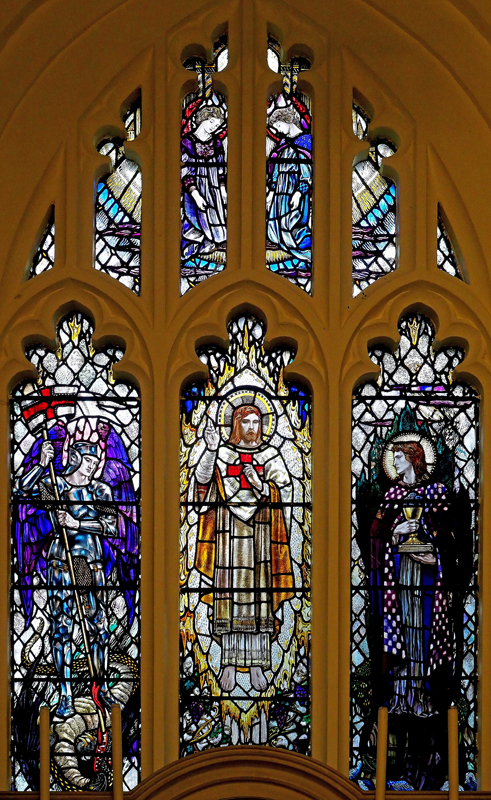
Stained glass behind altar

== See also ==
- Southall
