= All in the Mind (BBC radio) =

- Running time: 28 mins
- Country of origin: United Kingdom
- Language: English
- Home station: BBC Radio 4
- Hosted by: Anthony Clare; Raj Persaud; Kwame McKenzie; Tanya Byron; Claudia Hammond
- Produced by: Fiona Hill
- Website: Website
- Podcast: Podcast RSS feed

All in the Mind is a half-hour magazine radio programme about psychology and psychiatry, broadcast in weekly episodes on Radio 4 and produced by the BBC's Science Unit. It is currently presented by Claudia Hammond. Former presenters have included Raj Persaud, Kwame McKenzie, Tanya Byron, and the first presenter of the series, Anthony Clare.
