= Glassy Junction, Southall =

Vegetarian restaurant in London, England

Glassy Junction
- Interactive map of the Glassy Junction area
- Former names: Railway Tavern

General information
- Location: Southall, 97 South Road, London, England
- Coordinates: 51°30′26″N 0°22′41″W

The building at 97 South Road, Southall, London, popularly known as Glassy Junction, is a vegetarian restaurant and notable former pub.

== Location ==
The three storey building at 97 South Road, Southall, London, lies on the corner of Park Avenue, north of the Sri Gobind Singh Sports Centre and the Southall railway station and diagonally opposite Des Pardes. Southall Broadway is a few minutes walk away.

== History ==
Glassy Junction was a pub previously operating under the name the Charrington pub, and then known as the Railway Tavern, before being renamed in 1993. The establishment featured decor reflecting its cultural ties to India, including clocks displaying the time in both London and the Punjab. It was notable for accepting payment in both British pounds and Indian rupees. The clientele was predominantly male. Glassy Junction appeared in the 2007 Indian film Dhan Dhana Dhan Goal (2007). The pub closed in 2011.

== Restaurant ==
The building reopened on 5 June 2012 as an Indian vegetarian restaurant, part of the Saravana Bhavan chain.
