= Three Horseshoes, Southall =

Pub in Southall, London

Three Horseshoes
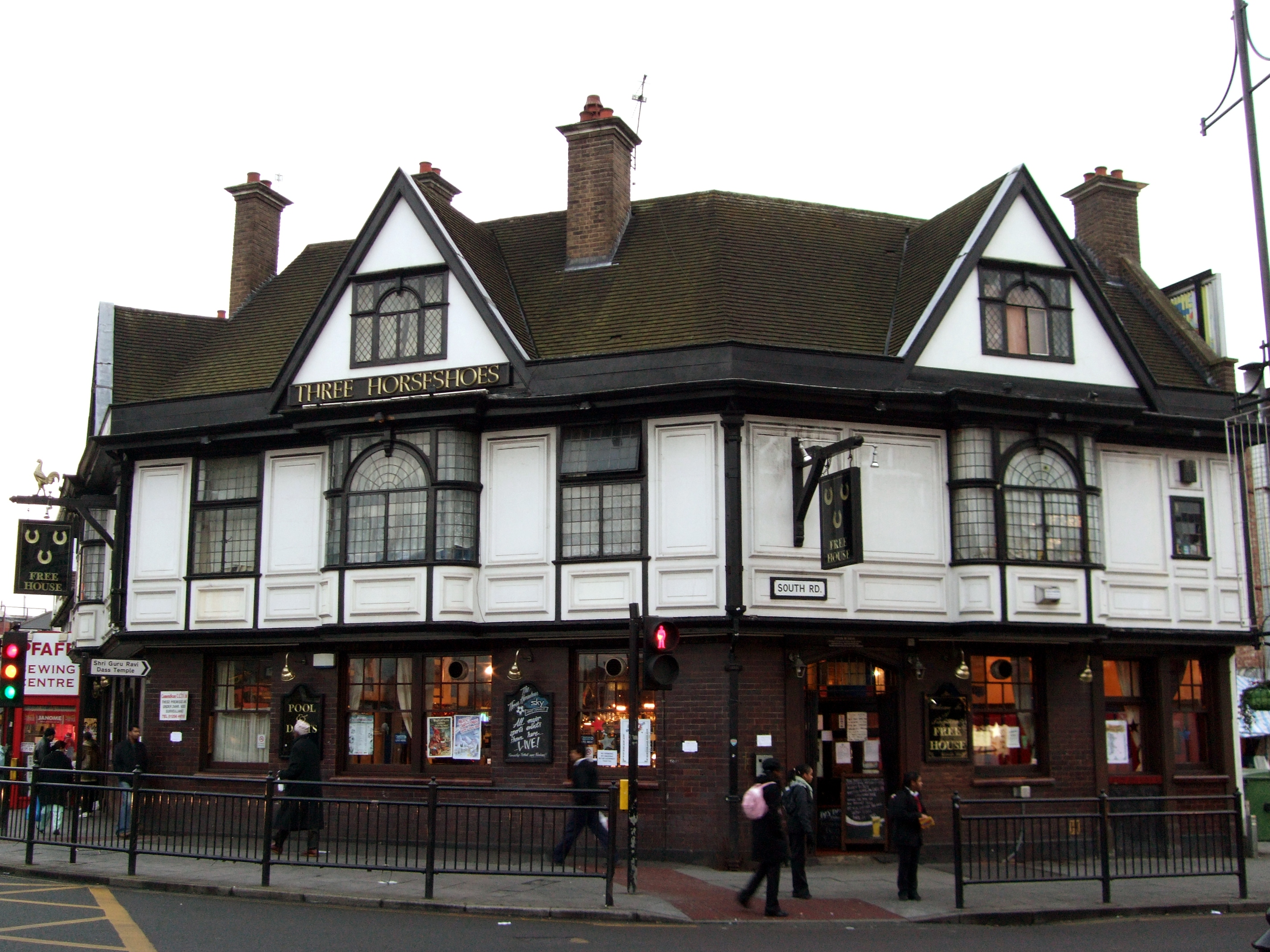
- Three Horseshoes

- Location within London Borough of Ealing Location within Greater London

General information
- Location: Southall Broadway, Southall, London, London, England
- Coordinates: 51°30′40″N 0°22′32″W
- Closed: 4 December 2016

Design and construction
- Architect: Nowell Parr.

The Three Horseshoes was a public house at Uxbridge Road and South Road at Southall Broadway, Southall, London.

It was built between 1914 and 1922 (construction was delayed by World War I) by the architect Nowell Parr.

In 1989, the local council proposed to demolish The Three Horseshoes as part of a town centre redevelopment scheme. However, this was opposed by CAMRA, the Twentieth Century Society and English Heritage, who nearly spot-listed the pub to save it.

CAMRA call it "perhaps one of the best examples of the earlier Nowell Parr's work".

It closed on 4 December 2016 and has been converted into shops and flats.
