= Norwood Green =

Coordinates: 51.5039°N 0.3741°W

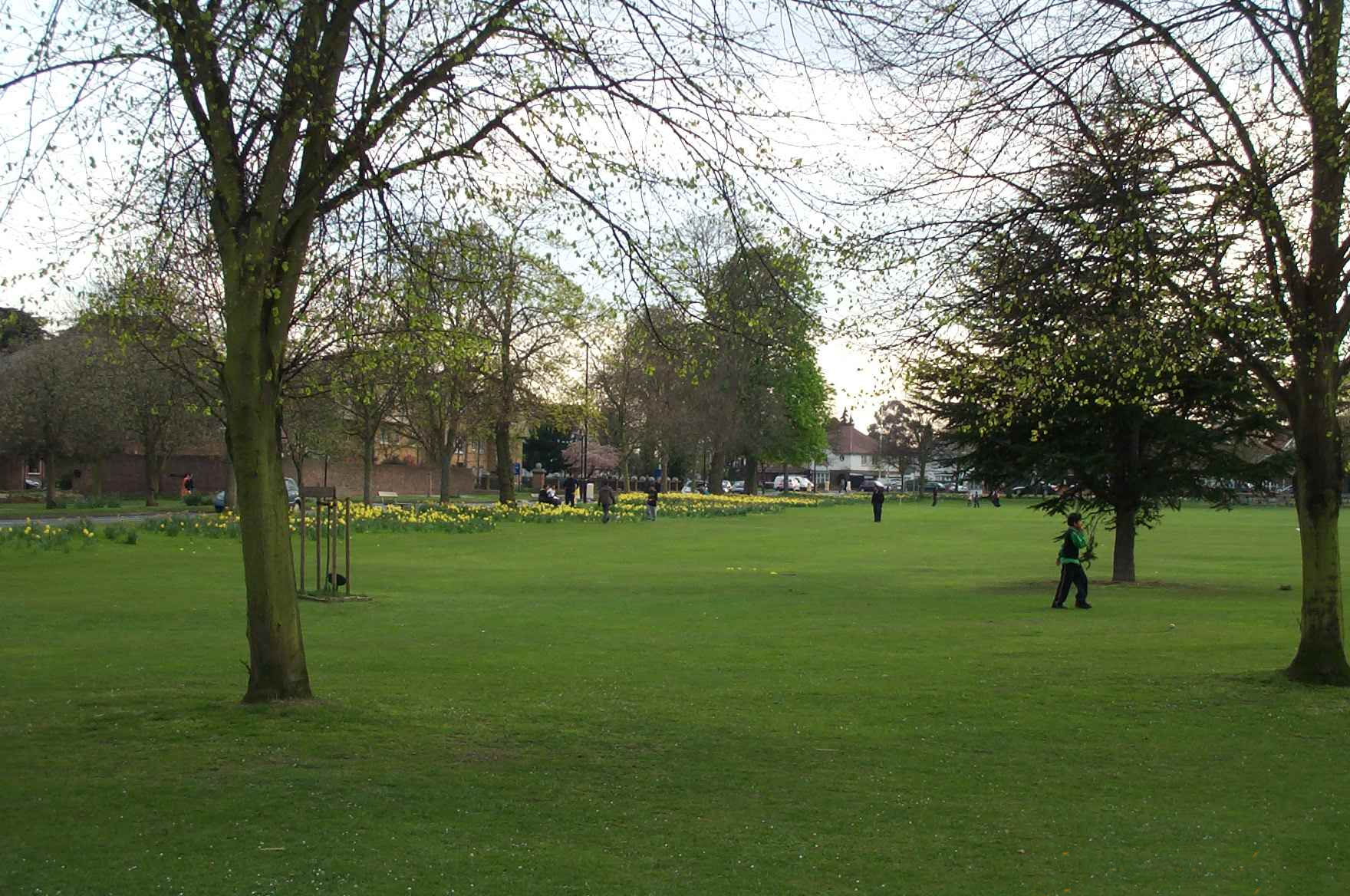
- The Green in Springtime

- Location within Greater London
- Population: 14,032 (2011 Census. Ward)
- OS grid reference: TQ135785
  - Charing Cross: 10.7 mi (17.2 km) E
- London borough: Ealing
- Ceremonial county: Greater London
- Region: London
- Country: England
- Sovereign state: United Kingdom
- Post town: Southall
- Postcode district: UB2
- Dialling code: 020
- Police: Metropolitan
- Fire: London
- Ambulance: London
- UK Parliament: Ealing Southall
- London Assembly: Ealing and Hillingdon

Norwood Green is a place in the London Borough of Ealing in London, England, that forms the southern part of Southall. It is a suburban development centred 10.7 miles (17.2 km) west of Charing Cross and 4 miles (6.4 km) ENE of Heathrow Airport.

Its origin coincides with the 12th century arch in its chapel, the date when it is first recorded. Reflecting its mid-19th century agrarian nature it remained below church status in Hayes parish until 1859.

It often lends its name to an electoral ward of around 12,500 people. It today forms the southern part of larger Southall, named after the main manor which lay in the north of its area which is south of Northolt parish.

Informally, Norwood Green overspills into part of Heston in the London Borough of Hounslow.

== History ==
Norwood Green is the modern name for the old hamlet called Norwood in the manor of Norwood; this name in turn derives from the Saxon settlement name recorded in contemporary orthography Northuuda which suggests a different final syllable, at least in some modes or among some speakers.

The manor (and near-identical chapelry) of Norwood was for more than eight centuries in the parish of Hayes until 1859 when the large chapel of St Mary became on paper a church and was upgraded to have a surrounding parish. This new parish encompassed also the main clusters of cottages named after their manors of Southall and Northcotte.

In 1894, under the Local Government Act 1894, Norwood Green formed part of the Southall Norwood Urban District of Middlesex. The urban district gained further status as a municipal borough in 1936 and was renamed Southall. When the municipal borough was abolished in 1965, under the London Government Act 1963, the area became part of the London Borough of Ealing.

The New Zealand bass player Gary Thain of the band Uriah Heep died of a heroin overdose here on 8 December 1975.

== Geography ==
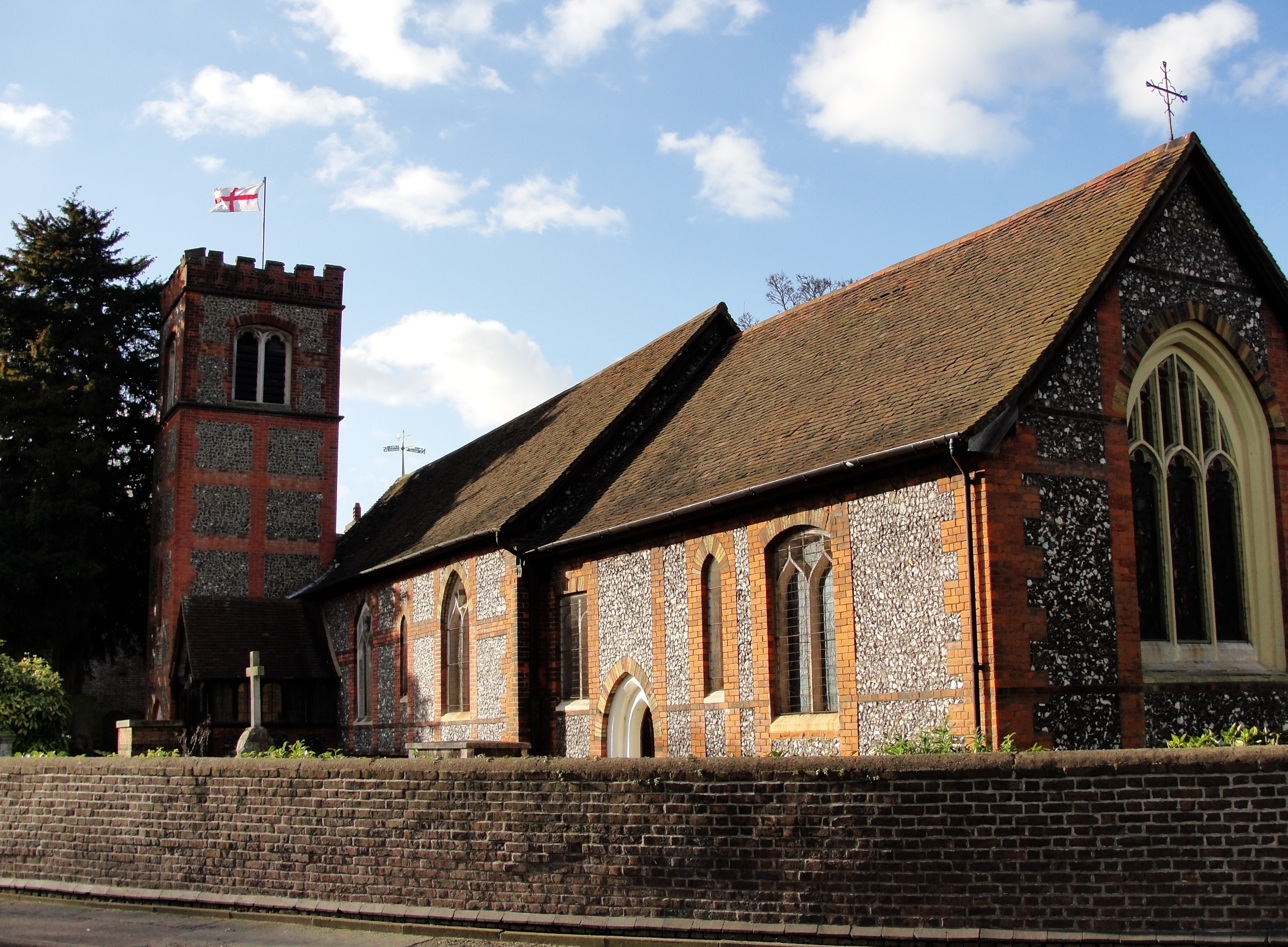
Church of St Mary The Virgin

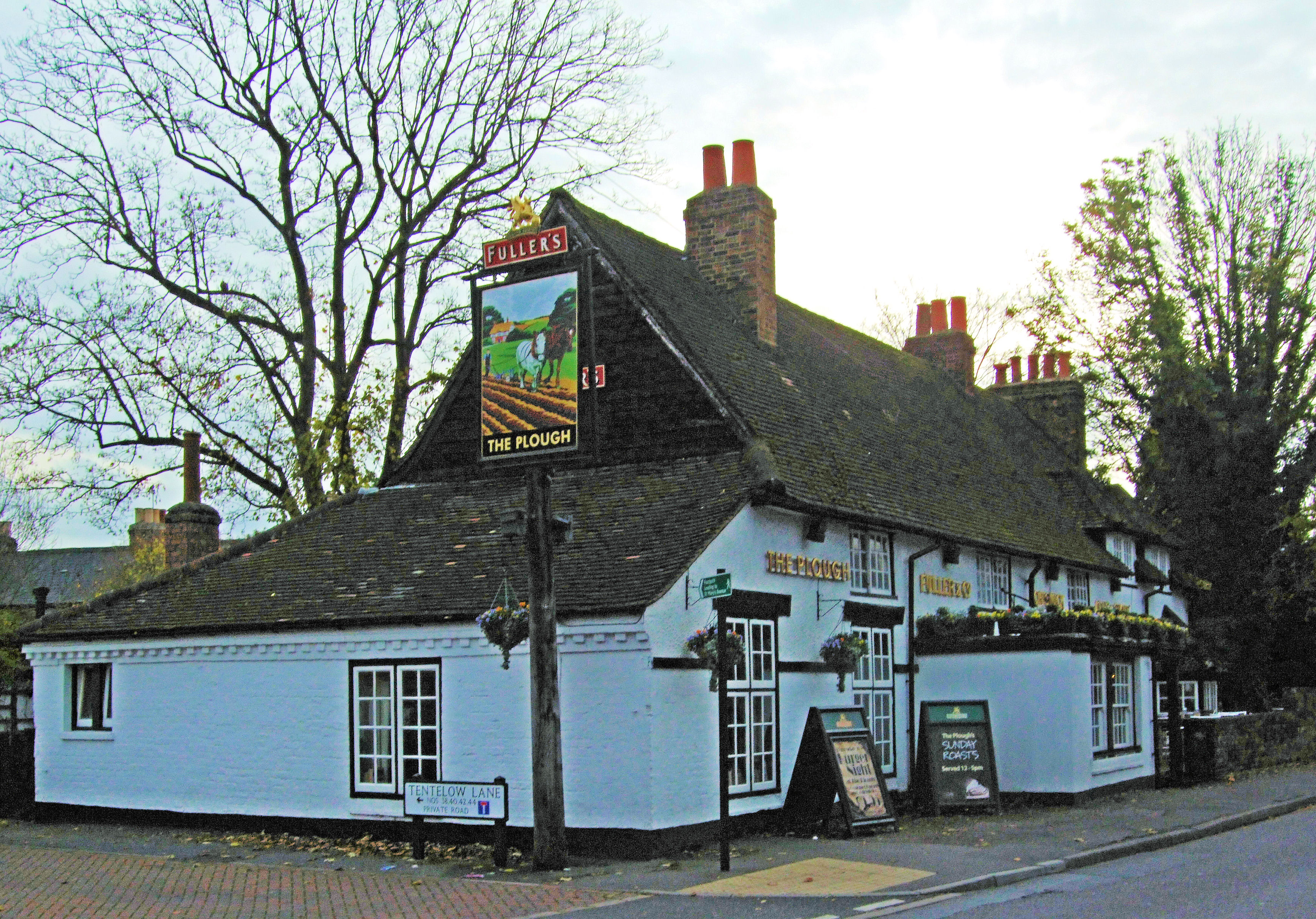
The Plough public house

Norwood Green is bounded by the Grand Union Canal to the north and its continuation the canalised Brent, east and North Hyde Lane and the line of a former brook south of that to the west.

Current Amenities

The village retains its green, church and two pubs: one by the canal, and one by Wolf Fields park. (Note: The pubs to the North of the Green are The Wolf, and further on, by the canal, The Lamb). There is a primary school in Norwood Green. The roadsides are lined with trees and there are several open spaces and wooded areas. Residential property consists of a mix of bungalows, large and small detached, semi-detached and terraced houses.

Listed buildings
Grade II*

The parish church (in the Church of England) of St Mary the Virgin, has a bell-tower and is protected under UK law as a Grade II* listed building, which is the middle category.

Grade II

A public house, The Plough, is grade II, (i.e. in the initial category) its hand drawn beers have been mentioned in an annual CAMRA selection.

Friars Lawn, a Georgian house, overlooks the Green, once a home of Gordon Selfridge of the retail family, and of the actress Hayley Mills.

Former amenities

Its own Metropolitan Police station and Post Office closed in 2008. Beside the Plough, a stables and bowling green were demolished in 2013.

== July village fair ==
The second Saturday of July is when the Norwood Green Residents' Association hold Village Day on the green - a fair and activities day - and the church is decorated and opened to visitors.

== Transport ==
Three Bridges (a transport intersection, designed and built by the Victorian engineer, Isambard Kingdom Brunel) in the north-east corner, is claimed as an icon of worldwide engineering heritage. Here north-south Windmill Lane goes over the Grand Union Canal (locally fed by the Welsh Harp Reservoir) on a gentle west–east reach towards the Thames at Brentford in turn above a single-track, freight, railway running from the main Great Western Main Line to just north of the major A4 road at Brentford. Two bridges exist at "Three Bridges" (the road over the canal bridge and the canal over the railway bridge) but they are stacked one above another with the road on top of the canal which is on top of the railway which is in a deep cutting at this point. The road bridge has weight and width restrictions.

The nearest underground station is Osterley tube station on the Piccadilly line, which is 30–40 minutes walk from the central area; allowing 20-minute connection with Heathrow Airport; 40 minutes to Central London.

Bus route 120 operates along Norwood Road with a stop at the Green itself. Buses run every 10–12 minutes during the day and every 20 minutes or so during the evening. Route H32 runs through the Western edge of Norwood Green ward (Hounslow Bus Garage to Southall Town Hall). Northwards it is just under a mile Southall railway station (Elizabeth line trains towards Heathrow Airport and Reading, and towards Abbey Wood and Shenfield via London Paddington).

The M4 motorway is accessed 2 miles (3.2 km) east for Central London the same distance west for Heathrow and western destinations. The A40 "Western Avenue" to the north and the A4 to the south are the nearest trunk roads and are east–west.

== Politics ==
Norwood Green or as "Norwood" the place has long given its name to the local electoral ward (for local council elections) electing councillors to Ealing Council. Norwood Green ward has three Labour councillors. Ealing Council having had a Labour administration since 2010.

The area is part of the parliamentary constituency of Ealing Southall, represented since 2007 by Labour Member of Parliament Virendra Sharma.

Norwood Green ward is in the London Assembly constituency of Ealing and Hillingdon which has one assembly member: Onkar Sahota (Labour), who was elected in May 2012. The Norwood Green Ward Forum (formerly the Area committee) is held in the main hall of St Mary's Church, Norwood Green.

== Demographics ==
According to the 2001 census, the population of the Norwood Green ward stood at 12,650. 67% of ward are in ethnic groups other than British. Indian/Pakistani is the largest ethnic group, making up 49.8% of the population of the Norwood Green ward.
