= Wellesley Institute =

Non-profit and non-partisan research and policy think tank in Toronto, Ontario, Canada

- Type: Public policy think tank
- Headquarters: Toronto, Ontario
- CEO: Kwame McKenzie
- Website: www.wellesleyinstitute.com

Wellesley Institute is a non-profit and non-partisan research and policy think tank in Toronto, Ontario, Canada. Its mission is to advance urban health and reduce health inequities through research and knowledge mobilization on the social determinants of health focusing on the relationships between health and housing, poverty and income distribution, social exclusion and other social and economic inequalities.

Wellesley Institute publishes policy papers, research studies, reports and recommendations through its website.

Wellesley Institute is a registered non-profit charity.

== History ==
Founded in 1912 by Herbert Bruce, the Wellesley Hospital was as a private-paying hospital in Toronto, Ontario, later becoming publicly operated in 1942. On August 25, 1948, the hospital underwent a formal amalgamation with Toronto General Hospital becoming the Wellesley Division of the Toronto General Hospital. In 1998 the Wellesley Division of Wellesley Central Hospital was closed by the Ontario government on the recommendation of the Ontario Health Services Restructuring Commission and the bulk of its programs were transferred between 1998 and 2002 to St. Michael's Hospital in Toronto. In its place, the Wellesley Central Health Corporation was established issuing a transition from a health service provider to a leader in urban health championing. The WCHC also oversaw the site transformation of the closed hospital to a long-term care facility, non-profit supportive housing complex, for-profit housing and the Wellesley Central Park.

In 2006 the WCHC changed its name to Wellesley Institute to reflect its evolution from developer into a think tank.

On March 24, 2014, Kwame McKenzie was appointed the new CEO of Wellesley Institute.

== See also ==
- Wellesley Hospital
