= 2026 Barnet London Borough Council election =

2026 English local government election

- 7 May 2026

All 63 seats to Barnet London Borough Council 32 seats needed for a majority
- Registered: 262,275
- Turnout: 110,832; 42.3% (▲4.4%)

| | First party | Second party | Third party |
|---|---|---|---|
| Leader | Barry Rawlings | Peter Zinkin | Linda Lusingu |
| Party | Labour | Conservative | Green |
| Leader's seat | Friern Barnet | Golders Green | Ran in Friern Barnet (lost) |
| Last election | 41 seats, 46.7% | 22 seats, 38.3% | 0 seats, 4.2% |
| Seats before | 40 | 19 | 1 |
| Seats won | 31 | 31 | 1 |
| Seat change | ▼10 | ▲9 | ▲1 |
| Popular vote | 79,353 | 102,246 | 47,038 |
| Percentage | 27.5% | 35.4% | 16.3% |
| Swing | ▼19.2 pp | ▼2.9 pp | ▲12.1 pp |
| | Fourth party |
| Leader | Mark Shooter |
| Party | Reform |
| Leader's seat | Ran in West Hendon (lost) |
| Last election | Did not stand |
| Seats before | 1 |
| Seats won | 0 |
| Seat change | Steady |
| Popular vote | 43,034 |
| Percentage | 14.9% |
| Swing | ▲14.9 pp |
- Map of the results of the 2026 Barnet London Borough council election. Labour in red, Conservatives in blue and Green in green.
Leader before election
Barry Rawlings
Labour
Leader after election
Barry Rawlings
Labour
No overall control

The 2026 Barnet London Borough Council election took place on 7 May 2026, as part of the 2026 United Kingdom local elections. All 63 members of Barnet London Borough Council were elected. The election took place alongside local elections in the other London boroughs.

Prior to the election, the council was under Labour majority control. The election saw the council go under no overall control; the Conservatives and Labour were each left with 31 seats and there was also a single Green Party councillor. At the subsequent annual council meeting on 19 May 2026, an attempt to install the Conservative leader Peter Zinkin as the new leader of the council was unsuccessful with Labour and the Green councillor voting against. Instead, the incumbent leader of the council, Barry Rawlings, was re-appointed to the role with the Conservatives abstaining and the Green opposing, leading to a Labour minority administration.

== Background ==
Result of the 2022 borough election

The thirty-two London boroughs were established in 1965 by the London Government Act 1963. They are the principal authorities in Greater London and have responsibilities including education, housing, planning, highways, social services, libraries, recreation, waste, environmental health and revenue collection. Some of the powers are shared with the Greater London Authority, which also manages passenger transport, police, and fire.

Barnet has been controlled by the Conservative Party for most of the council's existence, with Labour Party leading during a period of no overall control between 1994 and 2002, and Labour having an outright majority on the council since 2022. In the most recent prior election in 2022, Labour won 41 seats and the Conservatives won 22, with Labour receiving 43.0% and the Conservatives receiving 35.1% of the overall vote. Although neither won any seats, the Green Party won 9.9% of the vote across the borough and the Liberal Democrats won 9.4%. The incumbent leader of the council is Labour's Barry Rawlings, who has held the role since 2022.

=== Council term ===
Four councillors have switched allegiance during the council term, with Labour's Linda Lusingu leaving the party in January 2023 and later joining the Green Party in February 2026, and the Conservative Laithe Jajeh leaving in March 2024. Conservative councillor Mark Shooter defected to Reform UK in November 2024, and was joined in Reform by the former Conservative council leader Dan Thomas in June 2025. Thomas later resigned from the council on the 31st December 2025, becoming Reform's Welsh Leader in February 2026, leaving a vacant seat heading into the 2026 election. Jajeh was disqualified in April 2026 after not attending any meetings of the council for six months.

== Electoral process ==
Barnet, as is the case for all other London borough councils, elects all of its councillors at once every four years, with the previous election having taken place in 2022. The election takes place by multi-member first-past-the-post voting, with each ward being represented by two or three councillors. Electors will have as many votes as there are councillors to be elected in their ward, with the top two or three being elected.

All registered electors (British, Irish, Commonwealth and European Union citizens) living in London aged 18 or over are entitled to vote in the election. People who live at two addresses in different councils, such as university students with different term-time and holiday addresses, are entitled to be registered for and vote in elections in both local authorities. Voting in-person at polling stations takes place from 7:00 to 22:00 on election day, and voters are able to apply for postal votes or proxy votes in advance of the election.

== Previous council composition ==
Council composition following the 2022 election

Council composition ahead of the 2026 election

Council composition following the 2026 election

== Election results ==
Barnet local election result 2026
| Party | Seats | Gains | Losses | Net gain/loss | Seats % | Votes % | Votes | +/− |
|---|---|---|---|---|---|---|---|---|
| Conservative | 31 | 9 | 0 | ▲9 | 49.2 | 35.4 | 102,246 | -2.9 |
| Labour | 31 | 0 | 10 | ▼10 | 49.2 | 27.5 | 79,353 | -19.2 |
| Green | 1 | 1 | 0 | ▲1 | 1.6 | 16.3 | 47,038 | +12.1 |
| Reform | 0 | 0 | 0 | Steady | 0.0 | 14.9 | 43,034 | N/A |
| Liberal Democrats | 0 | 0 | 0 | Steady | 0.0 | 4.5 | 13,098 | -5.2 |
| Independent | 0 | 0 | 0 | Steady | 0.0 | 0.9 | 2,678 | +0.4 |
| Rejoin EU | 0 | 0 | 0 | Steady | 0.0 | 0.5 | 1,380 | +0.3 |
| TUSC | 0 | 0 | 0 | Steady | 0.0 | 0.0 | 128 | N/A |

== Ward results ==
=== Barnet Vale (3 seats) ===
Barnet Vale (3 seats)
| Party | Candidate | Votes | % | ±% |
|---|---|---|---|---|
| Labour | Sue Baker* | 2,130 | 36.6 | |
| Conservative | David Longstaff* | 2,024 | 34.8 | |
| Labour | Richard Barnes* | 1,994 | 34.3 | |
| Conservative | Elmina Homapour | 1,805 | 31.1 | |
| Conservative | Tom Smith | 1,797 | 30.9 | |
| Labour | Mukesh Oza | 1,674 | 28.8 | |
| Reform | Mark Francis | 952 | 16.4 | |
| Green | Mark Devey | 887 | 15.3 | |
| Reform | Julian Teare | 868 | 14.9 | |
| Reform | Uri Mofsowitz | 857 | 14.7 | |
| Green | Kevin Meehan | 694 | 11.9 | |
| Green | Matty Robins | 683 | 11.8 | |
| Liberal Democrats | Simon Cohen | 504 | 8.7 | |
| Liberal Democrats | Duncan Macdonald | 292 | 5.0 | |
| Liberal Democrats | Dave Keech | 274 | 4.7 | |
| Turnout | | ≈5812 | 49.0 | +6.6 |
| Labour hold | | Swing | | |
| Conservative hold | | Swing | | |
| Labour hold | | Swing | | |

=== Brunswick Park (3 seats) ===
Brunswick Park (3 seats)
| Party | Candidate | Votes | % | ±% |
|---|---|---|---|---|
| Conservative | Lewis Preston-Kyrionymou | 1,702 | 34.3 | −5.7 |
| Conservative | Paul Roberts | 1,642 | 33.1 | −5.1 |
| Conservative | Suren Ramanakumar | 1,567 | 31.6 | −6.1 |
| Labour | Giulia Monasterio* | 1,552 | 31.3 | −18.4 |
| Labour | Paul Lemon* | 1,533 | 30.9 | −18.2 |
| Labour | Tony Vourou* | 1,472 | 29.7 | −16.1 |
| Green | Hope Baker | 1,034 | 20.9 | +10.0 |
| Green | Andrew Dolby | 868 | 17.5 | N/A |
| Green | Andre Jenkins | 821 | 16.6 | N/A |
| Reform | Lisa Rutter | 818 | 16.5 | N/A |
| Reform | Chris Johnstone | 774 | 15.6 | N/A |
| Reform | Robert Pinfold | 743 | 15.0 | N/A |
| Liberal Democrats | Glyn Williams | 352 | 7.1 | +1.6 |
| Turnout | | ≈4959 | 44.7 | +3.3 |
| Conservative gain from Labour | | Swing | | |
| Conservative gain from Labour | | Swing | | |
| Conservative gain from Labour | | Swing | | |

=== Burnt Oak (3 seats) ===
Burnt Oak (3 seats)
| Party | Candidate | Votes | % | ±% |
|---|---|---|---|---|
| Labour | Sara Conway* | 1,475 | 39.5 | |
| Labour | Charlotte Daus* | 1,281 | 34.3 | |
| Labour | Kamal Gurung* | 1,279 | 34.2 | |
| Reform | Gary Gadston | 910 | 24.4 | |
| Green | Gabrielle Bailey | 896 | 24.0 | |
| Reform | Anthony Mace | 866 | 23.2 | |
| Reform | Oliver Segal | 791 | 21.2 | |
| Green | Freya Mutimer | 723 | 19.4 | |
| Conservative | Ruth Hart | 667 | 17.9 | |
| Green | Daniel Vulkan | 639 | 17.1 | |
| Conservative | Vijaya Ram | 592 | 15.9 | |
| Conservative | Ahmereen Reza | 482 | 12.9 | |
| Liberal Democrats | David Kitchen | 202 | 5.4 | |
| Liberal Democrats | Robin Marks | 185 | 5.0 | |
| Rejoin EU | Charles Honderick | 169 | 4.5 | |
| Independent | Sabriye Warsame | 49 | 1.3 | |

=== Childs Hill (3 seats) ===
Childs Hill (3 seats)
| Party | Candidate | Votes | % | ±% |
|---|---|---|---|---|
| Conservative | Jeremy Charles Conway | 2,356 | 44.8 | |
| Conservative | Adam Gheasuddin | 2,160 | 41.1 | |
| Conservative | Cory Turner | 2,070 | 39.4 | |
| Labour | Sue Hoffman-Waller | 1,321 | 25.1 | |
| Labour | Noam Herberg | 1,296 | 24.7 | |
| Labour | Matthew Perlberg* | 1,271 | 24.2 | |
| Green | Daniel Higgins Graham | 777 | 14.8 | |
| Green | Elsie Price | 750 | 14.3 | |
| Liberal Democrats | Sarah Hoyle | 649 | 12.3 | |
| Reform | Christopher Bosworth | 646 | 12.3 | |
| Green | Jake Ryan Videtzky | 619 | 11.8 | |
| Reform | Nicky Verra | 535 | 10.2 | |
| Reform | Patrick Leonard | 524 | 10.0 | |
| Liberal Democrats | Donna Joanne Pickup | 445 | 8.5 | |
| Liberal Democrats | Daniel Yilmaz | 353 | 6.7 | |
| Turnout | | ≈5257 | | |
| Conservative gain from Labour | | Swing | | |
| Conservative gain from Labour | | Swing | | |
| Conservative gain from Labour | | Swing | | |

=== Colindale North (2 seats) ===
Colindale North (2 seats)
| Party | Candidate | Votes | % | ±% |
|---|---|---|---|---|
| Labour | Andreas Ioannidis* | 693 | 39.7 | |
| Labour | Erin Sanders-McDonagh | 626 | 35.9 | |
| Green | Sam Goodman | 433 | 24.8 | |
| Green | Maud Waret | 365 | 20.9 | |
| Conservative | Alexander Michaelson | 338 | 19.4 | |
| Reform | Reza Haez | 274 | 15.7 | |
| Conservative | Samuel Shupac | 270 | 15.5 | |
| Reform | Paolo Negretti | 256 | 14.7 | |
| Liberal Democrats | Sarah-Jane O'Donnell | 158 | 9.1 | |
| Liberal Democrats | Dan Philpott | 75 | 4.3 | |
| Turnout | | ≈1744 | | |
| Labour hold | | Swing | | |
| Labour hold | | Swing | | |

=== Colindale South (3 seats) ===
Colindale South (3 seats)
| Party | Candidate | Votes | % | ±% |
|---|---|---|---|---|
| Labour | Humayune Khalick* | 1,358 | 36.9 | |
| Labour | Gil Sargeant* | 1,299 | 35.3 | |
| Labour | Nagus Narenthira* | 1,284 | 34.9 | |
| Conservative | Shiv Ghosh | 996 | 27.1 | |
| Conservative | Tanya Solomon | 952 | 25.9 | |
| Conservative | Tim McGeever | 933 | 25.4 | |
| Green | Melike Gucuck | 781 | 21.2 | |
| Green | Daniel Manson | 753 | 20.5 | |
| Green | Richard Moulton | 733 | 19.9 | |
| Reform | Susanne Hannington | 540 | 14.7 | |
| Reform | Mohsen Ojany | 407 | 11.1 | |
| Reform | Marek Vojcik | 407 | 11.1 | |
| Liberal Democrats | Tariq Gamei | 311 | 8.5 | |
| Liberal Democrats | Florence Mpia | 265 | 7.2 | |
| Turnout | | ≈3680 | | |
| Labour hold | | Swing | | |
| Labour hold | | Swing | | |
| Labour hold | | Swing | | |

=== Cricklewood (2 seats) ===
Cricklewood (2 seats)
| Party | Candidate | Votes | % | ±% |
|---|---|---|---|---|
| Labour | Anne Clarke* | 814 | 44.2 | |
| Labour | Alan Schneiderman* | 688 | 37.4 | |
| Green | Aron Clark | 472 | 25.7 | |
| Green | Danilo Paganelli | 411 | 22.3 | |
| Reform | Richard Bruce | 368 | 20.0 | |
| Reform | Jamie Dawood | 340 | 18.5 | |
| Conservative | Josh Rosefield-Green | 224 | 12.2 | |
| Conservative | Megan Tucker | 199 | 10.8 | |
| Liberal Democrats | Charles Forde | 90 | 4.9 | |
| Liberal Democrats | Charles Lawton | 74 | 4.0 | |
| Turnout | | ≈1840 | | |
| Labour hold | | | | |
| Labour hold | | | | |

=== East Barnet (3 seats) ===
East Barnet (3 seats)
| Party | Candidate | Votes | % | ±% |
|---|---|---|---|---|
| Labour | Simon Radford* | 1,856 | 33.0 | |
| Conservative | David Allen | 1,832 | 32.5 | |
| Labour | Phil Cohen* | 1,828 | 32.5 | |
| Labour | Edith David* | 1,745 | 31.0 | |
| Conservative | Pavan Pavanakumar | 1,616 | 28.7 | |
| Conservative | Anila Skeja | 1,589 | 28.2 | |
| Reform | Constantine Alexandrou | 1,131 | 20.1 | |
| Green | Emma Matthews | 981 | 17.4 | |
| Reform | Karl Khan | 921 | 16.4 | |
| Reform | Dima Ouda | 916 | 16.3 | |
| Green | Ozen Halil | 799 | 14.2 | |
| Green | Kornelia Szostak | 755 | 13.4 | |
| Liberal Democrats | Roger Aitken | 383 | 6.8 | |
| Liberal Democrats | Petros Ioannou | 294 | 5.2 | |
| Liberal Democrats | Walter Buchgraber | 241 | 4.3 | |
| Turnout | | ≈5629 | | |
| Labour hold | | Swing | | |
| Conservative gain from Labour | | Swing | | |
| Labour hold | | Swing | | |

=== East Finchley (3 seats) ===
East Finchley (3 seats)
| Party | Candidate | Votes | % | ±% |
|---|---|---|---|---|
| Labour | Alison Moore* | 2,508 | 50.3 | |
| Labour | Katy Minshall | 2,284 | 45.8 | |
| Labour | Ajith Menon | 2,200 | 44.1 | |
| Green | Steve Parsons | 1,101 | 22.1 | |
| Green | Nana Adu-Poku | 1,091 | 21.9 | |
| Green | Thomas Mason | 969 | 19.4 | |
| Conservative | Sebastian Ereira | 721 | 14.5 | |
| Conservative | Eitan Godsi | 716 | 14.4 | |
| Conservative | Jill Summers | 691 | 13.9 | |
| Reform | Daniel Brindusescu | 518 | 10.4 | |
| Reform | Melvin Haskins | 509 | 10.2 | |
| Reform | Paresh Kiri | 459 | 9.2 | |
| Liberal Democrats | Julia Hines | 416 | 8.3 | |
| Liberal Democrats | Sophie Leighton | 297 | 6.0 | |
| Liberal Democrats | Sachin Patel | 263 | 5.3 | |
| Rejoin EU | Brendan Donnelly | 209 | 4.2 | |
| Turnout | | ≈4984 | | |
| Labour hold | | Swing | | |
| Labour hold | | Swing | | |
| Labour hold | | Swing | | |

=== Edgware (3 seats) ===
Edgware (3 seats)
| Party | Candidate | Votes | % | ±% |
|---|---|---|---|---|
| Conservative | Shuey Gordon | 3,148 | 56.3 | |
| Conservative | Nick Mearing-Smith | 3,047 | 54.4 | |
| Conservative | Lucy Wakeley | 2,987 | 53.4 | |
| Reform | Anita Dunner | 1097 | 19.6 | |
| Reform | Derek French | 1004 | 17.9 | |
| Reform | Michael Sims | 912 | 16.3 | |
| Labour | Kathleen Levine | 859 | 15.4 | |
| Labour | Terence Orr | 717 | 12.8 | |
| Labour | Parmodh Sharma | 702 | 12.5 | |
| Green | Michelle Khanna | 680 | 12.2 | |
| Green | Deepa Shah | 673 | 12.0 | |
| Green | Richard Parkinson | 588 | 10.5 | |
| Liberal Democrats | Michael Goodman | 375 | 6.7 | |
| Turnout | | ≈5596 | | |
| Conservative hold | | Swing | | |
| Conservative hold | | Swing | | |
| Conservative hold | | Swing | | |

=== Edgwarebury (2 seats) ===
Edgwarebury (2 seats)
| Party | Candidate | Votes | % | ±% |
|---|---|---|---|---|
| Conservative | Benjamin Goldberg | 2,160 | 58.2 | |
| Conservative | Lachhya Gurung* | 1,951 | 52.5 | +5.7 |
| Reform | Barak Seener | 584 | 15.7 | |
| Reform | Georgina Morgan | 556 | 15 | |
| Labour | Vanessa David | 553 | 14.9 | |
| Green | Stephen Hobden | 463 | 12.5 | |
| Green | Rosanna Wiseman | 431 | 11.6 | |
| Labour | Viljo Wilding | 423 | 11.4 | |
| Turnout | | | | |
| Conservative hold | | Swing | | |
| Conservative hold | | Swing | | |

=== Finchley Church End (3 seats) ===
Finchley Church End (3 seats)
| Party | Candidate | Votes | % | ±% |
|---|---|---|---|---|
| Conservative | Jennifer Grocock* | 2,891 | | |
| Conservative | Josh Mastin-Lee | 2,889 | | |
| Conservative | Sachin Rajput | 2,618 | | |
| Labour | Lila Dinner | 1,250 | | |
| Labour | Anwar Azari | 1,162 | | |
| Labour | Emiljana Krali | 1,085 | | |
| Reform | Robert Blick | 780 | | |
| Green | Antonia Hughes | 775 | | |
| Green | Elizabeth Wardle | 736 | | |
| Reform | Spencer Landeg | 692 | | |
| Green | Jack Lewis | 687 | | |
| Reform | Paolo Zanini | 647 | | |
| Liberal Democrats | Jack Cohen | 434 | | |
| Liberal Democrats | Chris Butler | 352 | | |
| Liberal Democrats | Rowan Hall | 264 | | |
| Rejoin EU | Simon Bezer | 231 | | |
| Turnout | | | | |
| Conservative hold | | Swing | | |
| Conservative hold | | Swing | | |
| Conservative hold | | Swing | | |

=== Friern Barnet (3 seats) ===
Friern Barnet (3 seats)
| Party | Candidate | Votes | % | ±% |
|---|---|---|---|---|
| Labour | Pauline Webb* | 1,868 | 36.3 | −29.0 |
| Labour | Beverley Kotey | 1,737 | 33.8 | |
| Labour | Barry Rawlings* | 1,730 | 33.6 | |
| Green | Cameron Camina | 1,508 | 29.3 | +17.4 |
| Green | Linda Lusingu | 1,440 | 28.0 | |
| Green | Stephen Last | 1,360 | 26.5 | |
| Conservative | Elliot Hammer | 943 | 18.3 | −6.2 |
| Conservative | Nathan Relevy | 927 | 18.0 | |
| Conservative | Vinoo Sachania | 831 | 16.2 | |
| Reform | Jeff Hallifax | 708 | 13.8 | +13.8 |
| Reform | Joseph Pearce | 679 | 12.5 | |
| Reform | Marie Otigba | 642 | 12.5 | |
| Liberal Democrats | Samuel Weatherlake | 334 | 6.5 | −1.4 |
| Liberal Democrats | Daniel Weston | 279 | 5.4 | |
| Turnout | | 5,142 | 41.1 | +4.5 |
| Labour hold | | Swing | | |
| Labour hold | | Swing | | |
| Labour hold | | Swing | | |

=== Garden Suburb (2 seats) ===
Garden Suburb (2 seats)
| Party | Candidate | Votes | % | ±% |
|---|---|---|---|---|
| Conservative | Martha Levy | 2,681 | | |
| Conservative | Michael Mire | 2,613 | | |
| Labour | Nnenna Lancaster-Okoro | 667 | | |
| Labour | Matthew Staples | 659 | | |
| Reform | William Comet | 581 | | |
| Reform | Leon Magar | 529 | | |
| Green | Jason Byrnes | 365 | | |
| Green | Aaron Franks | 329 | | |
| Liberal Democrats | Malcolm Davis | 282 | | |
| Liberal Democrats | Altan Akbiyik | 255 | | |
| Independent | Brian Ingram | 173 | | |
| Turnout | | | | |
| Conservative hold | | Swing | | |
| Conservative hold | | Swing | | |

=== Golders Green (2 seats) ===
Golders Green (2 seats)
| Party | Candidate | Votes | % | ±% |
|---|---|---|---|---|
| Conservative | Dean Cohen | 2,619 | | |
| Conservative | Peter Zinkin* | 2,298 | | |
| Labour | Charlotte Harrison | 455 | | |
| Reform | Gedale Weinberg | 386 | | |
| Reform | Simon Tobi | 380 | | |
| Labour | Charles Harvey | 347 | | |
| Green | Nusayba Ali | 302 | | |
| Green | David Mellows | 278 | | |
| Liberal Democrats | Toby Davis | 130 | | |
| Liberal Democrats | Lavinia Jessup | 100 | | |
| Rejoin EU | Giovanni Cerutti | 87 | | |
| Turnout | | | | |
| Conservative hold | | Swing | | |
| Conservative hold | | Swing | | |

=== Hendon (3 seats) ===
Hendon (3 seats)
| Party | Candidate | Votes | % | ±% |
|---|---|---|---|---|
| Conservative | Asher Bennett | 2,870 | | |
| Conservative | Alex Prager* | 2,844 | | |
| Conservative | Shimon Ryde | 2,757 | | |
| Reform | Jeremy Apfel | 870 | | |
| Reform | Hannah Messham | 731 | | |
| Labour | Lewis Harrison | 722 | | |
| Reform | Dylan Marshall | 695 | | |
| Labour | Precious Lancaster-Okoro | 655 | | |
| Green | Francisco Costa | 611 | | |
| Labour | Robert Persad | 600 | | |
| Green | Ben Samuel | 536 | | |
| Green | Nigel Ostime | 519 | | |
| Liberal Democrats | James Goldman | 273 | | |
| Rejoin EU | Ben Rend | 177 | | |
| Turnout | | | | |
| Conservative hold | | Swing | | |
| Conservative hold | | Swing | | |
| Conservative hold | | Swing | | |

=== High Barnet (2 seats) ===
High Barnet (2 seats)
| Party | Candidate | Votes | % | ±% |
|---|---|---|---|---|
| Conservative | James Esses | 1,558 | | |
| Labour | Emma Whysall* | 1,441 | | |
| Labour | Oliver Gough | 1,417 | | |
| Conservative | Amberley Thay | 1,372 | | |
| Reform | Darius Hutchinson | 689 | | |
| Reform | Rajesh Gulabivala | 631 | | |
| Green | Fanxi Liu | 538 | | |
| Green | Charles Wicksteed | 536 | | |
| Liberal Democrats | Andrew Jackson | 497 | | |
| Liberal Democrats | Grant McKenna | 357 | | |
| Turnout | | | | |
| Conservative gain from Labour | | Swing | | |
| Labour hold | | Swing | | |

=== Mill Hill (3 seats) ===
Mill Hill (3 seats)
| Party | Candidate | Votes | % | ±% |
|---|---|---|---|---|
| Conservative | Elliot Simberg* | 2,473 | | |
| Conservative | Nicole Ereira | 2,303 | | |
| Conservative | Raffy Lachter | 2,265 | | |
| Independent | Frank Orman | 1,063 | | |
| Reform | Avi Benezra | 916 | | |
| Labour | Laura Ouseley | 889 | | |
| Labour | Jake Baker | 867 | | |
| Reform | Leo Fruhman | 821 | | |
| Labour | Adam Langleben | 804 | | |
| Independent | Danny Al-Khafaji | 774 | | |
| Green | Billie Cheney | 727 | | |
| Green | Sahra Taylor | 727 | | |
| Reform | Sury Khatri | 701 | | |
| Green | Peter Williams | 572 | | |
| Liberal Democrats | Charles Wakefield | 368 | | |
| Conservative gain from | | Swing | | |
| Conservative gain from | | Swing | | |
| Conservative gain from | | Swing | | |

=== Totteridge and Woodside (3 seats) ===
Totteridge and Woodside (3 seats)
| Party | Candidate | Votes | % | ±% |
|---|---|---|---|---|
| Conservative | Alison Cornelius* | 2,533 | | |
| Conservative | Caroline Stock | 2,436 | | |
| Conservative | Richard Cornelius* | 2,432 | | |
| Labour | Karen Alcock | 1,074 | | |
| Labour | Robin Johnson | 972 | | |
| Labour | Diomira Way | 876 | | |
| Reform | Adam Collins | 771 | | |
| Reform | Rick Prior | 730 | | |
| Green | Dana McNee | 717 | | |
| Reform | Katie Reid | 712 | | |
| Green | Ben Keeling | 706 | | |
| Green | Fabio Vollono | 640 | | |
| Rejoin EU | Jaz Alduk | 201 | | |
| Conservative gain from | | Swing | | |
| Conservative gain from | | Swing | | |
| Conservative gain from | | Swing | | |

=== Underhill (2 seats) ===
Underhill (2 seats)
| Party | Candidate | Votes | % | ±% |
|---|---|---|---|---|
| Labour | Zahra Beg* | 1,233 | | |
| Labour | Josh Tapper | 1,128 | | |
| Conservative | Lucy Milner | 829 | | |
| Reform | Andrew Hutchings | 826 | | |
| Reform | Alison Mills | 774 | | |
| Conservative | Reuben Ward | 683 | | |
| Independent | Gina Theodorou | 619 | | |
| Green | Hugh Platt | 595 | | |
| Green | Carl White | 427 | | |
| Liberal Democrats | Stephen Barber | 252 | | |
| Liberal Democrats | Sean Hooker | 228 | | |
| TUSC | Riann Mehta | 128 | | |
| Rejoin EU | Donato Briamonte | 122 | | |
| Labour gain from | | Swing | | |
| Labour gain from | | Swing | | |

=== West Finchley (3 seats) ===
West Finchley (3 seats)
| Party | Candidate | Votes | % | ±% |
|---|---|---|---|---|
| Labour | Ross Houston | 2,115 | 12.69 | |
| Labour | Kath McGuirk | 2,083 | 12.50 | |
| Labour | Danny Rich | 1,989 | 11.94 | |
| Green | Nina Fletcher | 1,332 | 7.99 | |
| Conservative | Nigel Saidler | 1,329 | 7.97 | |
| Conservative | Jai Mirpuri | 1,272 | 7.63 | |
| Conservative | Mirzan Kama | 1,197 | 7.18 | |
| Green | Zahra Khan | 1,177 | 7.06 | |
| Green | Ed Tytherleigh | 1,061 | 6.37 | |
| Reform | Danny Feldman | 756 | 4.54 | |
| Reform | Anirudh Shah | 581 | 3.49 | |
| Reform | Ali Haji | 538 | 3.23 | |
| Liberal Democrats | Janice Turner | 449 | 2.69 | |
| Liberal Democrats | Dudley Miles | 413 | 2.48 | |
| Liberal Democrats | Gregory Ruback | 373 | 2.24 | |

=== West Hendon (3 seats) ===
West Hendon (3 seats)
| Party | Candidate | Votes | % | ±% |
|---|---|---|---|---|
| Labour | Andrea Bilbow* | 1,359 | 11.8 | −44.2 |
| Labour | Rishikesh Chakraborty* | 1,327 | 11.5 | −40.3 |
| Labour | Carrie Reiners | 1,206 | 10.5 | |
| Reform | Mark Shooter | 883 | 7.7 | |
| Reform | Emma Kelly | 875 | 7.6 | |
| Reform | Yosef David | 868 | 7.5 | |
| Green | Dominique Gomez | 835 | 7.2 | |
| Conservative | Leon Silver | 835 | 7.2 | |
| Green | Kate Tokley | 819 | 7 | |
| Green | James O'Connell | 775 | 6.7 | |
| Conservative | Ansuya Sodha | 768 | 6.7 | |
| Conservative | Adelina Truta | 750 | 6.5 | |
| Liberal Democrats | Jeremy Walsh | 245 | 2.1 | |
| Labour gain from | | Swing | | |
| Labour gain from | | Swing | | |
| Labour gain from | | Swing | | |

=== Whetstone (2 seats) ===
Whetstone (2 seats)
| Party | Candidate | Votes | % | ±% |
|---|---|---|---|---|
| Labour | Ezra Cohen | 1,292 | | |
| Conservative | Stephen Lewis | 1,290 | | |
| Conservative | Kevin Ghateh | 1285 | | |
| Labour | Ella Rose-Jacobs | 1200 | | |
| Reform | Adrian Kitching | 543 | | |
| Green | David Burns | 535 | | |
| Green | Vaidehi Hegde | 478 | | |
| Reform | Martin Navias | 471 | | |
| Liberal Democrats | Luigi Bille | 194 | | |
| Liberal Democrats | John MacRory | 146 | | |
| Rejoin EU | Richard Hewison | 79 | | |

=== Woodhouse (2 seats) ===
Woodhouse (2 seats)
| Party | Candidate | Votes | % | ±% |
|---|---|---|---|---|
| Green | Charli Thompson | 1,331 | | |
| Labour | Anne Cecilia Hutton* | 1,287 | | |
| Green | George Ttoouli | 1194 | | |
| Labour | Nigel Young | 1142 | | |
| Conservative | Samson Richard Reddy | 895 | | |
| Conservative | Shaan-Yusef Haruwn Owusu-Afriyie | 726 | | |
| Reform | Ishpal Anand | 593 | | |
| Reform | Parveen Sanghera | 552 | | |
| Liberal Democrats | Penny Gostyn | 210 | | |
| Liberal Democrats | Anke Lohmann | 165 | | |
| Rejoin EU | Santo Mosca | 105 | | |
| Turnout | | | | |
| Green gain from Labour | | Swing | | |
| Labour hold | | Swing | | |
