= 1990 Barnet London Borough Council election =

1990 local election in England

- 5 May 1994

All 60 seats up for election to Barnet London Borough Council 31 seats needed for a majority
- Registered: 211,403
- Turnout: 105,694, 50.00%

	First party	Second party	Third party
Party	Conservative	Labour	Liberal Democrats
Seats won	39	18	3
Seat change	Steady	Steady	Steady
Popular vote	141,815	102,847	30,918
Percentage	49.80%	36.12%	10.86%
- Map of the results of the 1990 Barnet London Borough council election. Conservatives in blue and Labour in red.
Council control before election
Conservative
Council control after election
Conservative

The 1990 Barnet Council election took place on 3 May 1990 to elect members of Barnet London Borough Council in London, England. The whole council was up for election and the Conservative party stayed in overall control of the council.

== Election result ==
Overall turnout in the election was 50.0%.

Barnet local election result 1990
Party	Seats	Gains	Losses	Net gain/loss	Seats %	Votes %	Votes	+/−
Conservative	39	3	3	0	65.00	49.80	141,815	
Labour	18	3	3	0	30.00	36.12	102,847	
Liberal Democrats	3	0	0	0	5.00	10.86	30,918	
Green	0	0	0	Steady	0.00	2.11	6,017	
Independent	0	0	0	Steady	0.00	0.59	1,671	
Independent Resident	0	0	0	Steady	0.00	0.25	705	
Ind. Conservative	0	0	0	Steady	0.00	0.21	595	
SDP	0	0	0	Steady	0.00	0.07	208	
Total	60						284,776	

== Ward results ==
(*) - indicates an incumbent candidate

(†) - Indicates an incumbent candidate standing in a different ward

=== Arkley ===
Arkley (3)
Party	Candidate	Votes	%
Labour	Anita Campbell	2,589	43.12
Labour	Kevin Smith	2,456	
Labour	Pamela Coleman	2,443	
Conservative	Ian Balcombe*	2,422	40.99
Conservative	Arthur Beck* (Note: Beck replaced Cllr. Leah Hertz after their death in 1988)	2,374	
Conservative	Philip Williams* (Note: Williams replaced Cllr. Wilfred Lipman after his death in 1989)	2,322	
Liberal Democrats	David Keech	768	12.68
Liberal Democrats	Michael Cleal	746	
Liberal Democrats	Trevor Orr	689	
Green	Aniel Paranjpe	186	3.21
Registered electors		11,975	
Turnout		6037	50.41
Rejected ballots		10	0.17
Labour gain from Conservative			
Labour gain from Conservative			
Labour gain from Conservative			

=== Brunswick Park ===
Brunswick Park (3)
Party	Candidate	Votes	%
Conservative	Donald Goodman*	2,643	56.04
Conservative	Irene Palmer*	2,507	
Conservative	John Rawles*	2,489	
Labour	David Bloyce	1,568	33.00
Labour	Rita Brent	1,471	
Labour	Janet Heathfield	1,458	
Liberal Democrats	Alwena Lillywhite	509	10.96
Liberal Democrats	Peter Watkins	503	
Liberal Democrats	Andrew Hydon	483	
Registered electors		10,580	
Turnout		4913	46.44
Rejected ballots		9	0.18
Conservative hold			
Conservative hold			
Conservative hold			

=== Burnt Oak ===
Burnt Oak (3)
Party	Candidate	Votes	%
Labour	Alan Williams*	2,548	55.45
Labour	Malcolm Sargeant	2,300	
Labour	Gerald Shamash*	2,183	
Conservative	Oliver Stone	1,172	27.02
Conservative	Patricia Gammond	1,153	
Conservative	Robert Musik	1,101	
Green	Dorothy Lewis	428	10.13
Liberal Democrats	Albert Earley	313	7.40
Registered electors		9,701	
Turnout		4330	44.63
Rejected ballots		0	0.00
Labour hold			
Labour hold			
Labour hold			

=== Childs Hill ===
Childs Hill (3)
Party	Candidate	Votes	%
Liberal Democrats	Monroe Palmer*	1,803	38.75
Liberal Democrats	Jack Cohen*	1,637	
Liberal Democrats	Brian Stone*	1,579	
Conservative	Malcolm Harris	1,420	32.49
Conservative	Simone Plaut	1,405	
Conservative	Richard Martyn	1,385	
Labour	June Cort	1,043	22.58
Labour	David Gottlieb	970	
Labour	Anthony Hulstrom	913	
Green	Ashley Gunstock	267	6.18
Registered electors		8,751	
Turnout		4440	50.74
Rejected ballots		0	0.00
Liberal Democrats hold			
Liberal Democrats hold			
Liberal Democrats hold			

=== Colindale ===
Colindale (3)
Party	Candidate	Votes	%
Labour	Ellis Hillman*	2,298	47.38
Labour	Thomas McKendry*	2,226	
Labour	David Williams	2,186	
Conservative	Robert Linton	1,050	22.16
Conservative	William Nicholson	1,041	
Independent Resident	Eyo Nkune	705	14.93
Green	Simon Moroney	424	8.98
Liberal Democrats	Joy Manson	341	6.55
Liberal Democrats	Peter Lusher	315	
Liberal Democrats	Alfred Stone	271	
Registered electors		9,854	
Turnout		4252	43.15
Rejected ballots		4	0.09
Labour hold			
Labour hold			
Labour hold			

=== East Barnet ===
East Barnet (3)
Party	Candidate	Votes	%
Conservative	Olwen Evans*	2,446	45.48
Conservative	John Perry*	2,370	
Conservative	Jihad Anani	2,193	
Labour	Janet Donald	2,068	39.62
Labour	Janice Scott	2,051	
Labour	Jeffrey Leifer	1,987	
Liberal Democrats	Margaret Neil	617	10.85
Liberal Democrats	Nicholas Sullivan	537	
Liberal Democrats	Sonia McCabe	516	
SDP	Colin Shaw	208	4.05
Registered electors		10,898	
Turnout		5403	49.58
Rejected ballots		10	0.19
Conservative hold			
Conservative hold			
Conservative hold			

=== East Finchley ===
East Finchley (3)
Party	Candidate	Votes	%
Labour	John Davies*	3,699	64.65
Labour	Joan Ryan	3,417	
Labour	Rudolf, J. Vis^{†} (Note: Vis was a sitting councillor for the Woodhouse ward)	3,269	
Conservative	Franklin Evans	1,986	35.35
Conservative	Christopher Thompson	1,892	
Conservative	Harjinder Aujla	1,800	
Registered electors		11,109	
Turnout		5893	53.05
Rejected ballots		37	0.63
Labour hold			
Labour hold			
Labour hold			

=== Edgware ===
Edgware (3)
Party	Candidate	Votes	%
Conservative	Julian Czarny	2,996	58.98
Conservative	Malcolm Lester*	2,938	
Conservative	Archibald Smith*	2,874	
Labour	Elizabeth Kelly	1,321	25.55
Labour	Jack Jaffe	1,253	
Labour	Keith Hurcombe	1,241	
Liberal Democrats	Philip Benjamin	443	7.61
Green	Michael Walton	391	7.86
Liberal Democrats	Barbara Farbey	349	
Liberal Democrats	Dorothy Rollinson	344	
Registered electors		11,176	
Turnout		5092	45.56
Rejected ballots		3	0.06
Conservative hold			
Conservative hold			
Conservative hold			

=== Finchley ===
Finchley (3)
Party	Candidate	Votes	%
Conservative	Eva Greenspan	3,160	56.70
Conservative	Leslie Sussman*	3,157	
Conservative	Barbara Langstone*	3,143	
Labour	Katherine McGuirk	1,641	28.70
Labour	Ruth Montague	1,584	
Labour	Alan Schamroth	1,563	
Green	Laurie Thompson	500	8.99
Liberal Democrats	Malcolm Davis	332	5.61
Liberal Democrats	Michael Cole	313	
Liberal Democrats	Bernadette Cleal	290	
Registered electors		9,757	
Turnout		5533	56.71
Rejected ballots		19	0.34
Conservative hold			
Conservative hold			
Conservative hold			

=== Friern Barnet ===
Friern Barnet (3)
Party	Candidate	Votes	%
Conservative	John Tiplady*	2,913	52.89
Conservative	Christopher Platford*	2,896	
Conservative	Brian Salinger*	2,895	
Labour	John Ellis	2,035	36.94
Labour	Lorimer Mackenzie	2,024	
Labour	Philip O'Connor	2,020	
Liberal Democrats	Nick Harvey	579	10.17
Liberal Democrats	Timothy Tombs	554	
Liberal Democrats	Andrew Wade	541	
Registered electors		10,796	
Turnout		5860	54.28
Rejected ballots		13	0.22
Conservative hold			
Conservative hold			
Conservative hold			

=== Garden Suburb ===
Garden Suburb (3)
Party	Candidate	Votes	%
Conservative	Frank Davis*	2,948	59.60
Conservative	Roy Shutz*	2,923	
Conservative	Veronica Soskin* (Note: Soskin replaced Cllr. Coral Sebag-Montefiore after their resignation in 1988)	2,891	
Liberal Democrats	Majorie Harris	966	19.28
Liberal Democrats	Michael Pickering	942	
Liberal Democrats	Susette Palmer	927	
Labour	Penelope Grant	569	11.35
Labour	Jula Westman	567	
Labour	Ephraim Lesser	531	
Green	Janet Strangeways	479	9.77
Registered electors		9,575	
Turnout		4908	51.26
Rejected ballots		3	0.06
Conservative hold			
Conservative hold			
Conservative hold			

=== Golders Green ===
Golders Green (3)
Party	Candidate	Votes	%
Conservative	Melvin Cohen*	1,874	38.76
Conservative	Leslie Foster*	1,762	
Conservative	John Hedge	1,627	
Labour	Peter Theobold	1,287	28.22
Labour	Nicholas Kissen	1,273	
Labour	Ghada Karmi	1,270	
Liberal Democrats	Harold Wiesenfeld	1,244	26.41
Liberal Democrats	Mira Levy	1,172	
Liberal Democrats	Barrie Manson	1,169	
Green	Christopher Brown	299	6.61
Registered electors		9,485	
Turnout		4629	48.80
Rejected ballots		7	0.15
Conservative hold			
Conservative hold			
Conservative hold			

=== Hadley ===
Hadley (3)
Party	Candidate	Votes	%
Conservative	Gillian Bull*	3,305	39.01
Conservative	Ashley Newman	3,031	
Conservative	Hazel Mammatt	2,864	
Labour	David Clarke	1,707	20.80
Labour	Michael Campbell	1,694	
Independent	Anthony Freake	1,671	21.26
Labour	Michael Larcey	1,503	
Liberal Democrats	Rosemary Watkins	855	9.24
Liberal Democrats	David Smith	789	
Green	Kevin Pressland	762	9.69
Liberal Democrats	Brigid Povah	533	
Registered electors		13,274	
Turnout		6760	50.93
Rejected ballots		5	0.07
Conservative hold			
Conservative hold			
Conservative hold			

=== Hale ===
Hale (3)
Party	Candidate	Votes	%
Conservative	Leslie Pym*	2,588	50.34
Conservative	Sheila Scott	2,507	
Conservative	Jack Clarfelt*	2,470	
Labour	Marie Baker	1,608	30.98
Labour	Andrew Dickie	1,545	
Labour	William Parnaby	1,504	
Liberal Democrats	James Creighton	516	9.24
Green	Patricia Duncan	473	9.44
Liberal Democrats	Geoffrey Jacobs	457	
Liberal Democrats	Quintin Iwi	415	
Registered electors		9,983	
Turnout		5114	51.23
Rejected ballots		3	0.06
Conservative hold			
Conservative hold			
Conservative hold			

=== Hendon ===
Hendon (3)
Party	Candidate	Votes	%
Conservative	Anthony Finn	2,789	58.19
Conservative	Edward Bunn	2,692	
Conservative	Frederick Poole*	2,641	
Labour	Francis Deutsch	1,520	32.03
Labour	Colin Francombe	1,518	
Labour	Bryan Reith	1,432	
Liberal Democrats	Joan Beales	491	9.78
Liberal Democrats	Richard Coward	454	
Liberal Democrats	David Ive	419	
Registered electors		10,722	
Turnout		5055	47.15
Rejected ballots		9	0.18
Conservative hold			
Conservative hold			
Conservative hold			

=== Mill Hill ===
Mill Hill (3)
Party	Candidate	Votes	%
Conservative	Dennis Dippel*	2,879	55.17
Conservative	Anthony Antoniou*	2,837	
Conservative	John Hart*	2,775	
Labour	Ian Parker	1,394	25.20
Labour	Malcolm Perez	1,275	
Labour	Adrienne van Louen	1,210	
Liberal Democrats	Ruth Cohen	591	10.35
Liberal Democrats	Terry Rollinson	510	
Liberal Democrats	John Mitchell	491	
Green	Anthony Duncan	476	9.28
Registered electors		11,024	
Turnout		5205	47.22
Rejected ballots		2	0.04
Conservative hold			
Conservative hold			
Conservative hold			

=== St Paul’s ===
St Paul’s (3)
Party	Candidate	Votes	%
Conservative	Helena Hart	2,600	40.38
Conservative	Mike Freer	2,585	
Conservative	Mary Phillips	2,428	
Labour	Naren Dave*	2,399	36.72
Labour	Kitty Lyons*	2,313	
Labour	Melanie Packer	2,212	
Green	John Colmans	845	13.44
Ind. Conservative	John Fitzgibbon	595	9.46
Registered electors		10,048	
Turnout		5868	58.40
Rejected ballots		16	0.27
Conservative gain from Labour			
Conservative gain from Labour			
Conservative gain from Labour			

=== Totteridge ===
Totteridge (3)
Party	Candidate	Votes	%
Conservative	Cecile Levinson*	2,949	55.25
Conservative	Victor Usher*	2,949	
Conservative	Victor Lyon*	2,946	
Labour	Clare Abbott	1,477	26.22
Labour	Stuart Fuller	1,383	
Labour	Sean Wallace	1,338	
Liberal Democrats	Francoise Lewis	506	9.41
Liberal Democrats	Jennifer Keech	503	
Liberal Democrats	Peter Finlayson	496	
Green	Michael Baldock	487	9.12
Registered electors		10,980	
Turnout		5411	49.28
Rejected ballots		11	0.20
Conservative hold			
Conservative hold			
Conservative hold			

=== West Hendon ===
West Hendon (3)
Party	Candidate	Votes	%
Labour	Timothy Sims*	2,132	49.63
Labour	Doreen Neall*	2,102	
Labour	Agnes Slocombe*	2,001	
Conservative	Dennis Hope	1,767	41.60
Conservative	Jane Ellison	1,763	
Conservative	Jayandra Patel	1,697	
Liberal Democrats	Erika Coward	395	8.77
Liberal Democrats	John Beales	383	
Liberal Democrats	David Loxton	322	
Registered electors		10,125	
Turnout		4647	45.90
Rejected ballots		12	0.26
Labour hold			
Labour hold			
Labour hold			

=== Woodhouse ===
Woodhouse (3)
Party	Candidate	Votes	%
Labour	Stanley Cross	3,002	51.09
Labour	Michael Harris*	2,987	
Labour	Dennis Reed*	2,979	
Conservative	Richard Evans	2,899	48.91
Conservative	Donald Taylor	2,885	
Conservative	Graham Old	2,801	
Registered electors		11,590	
Turnout		6344	54.74
Rejected ballots		39	0.61
Labour hold			
Labour hold			
Labour hold			
