= 1994 Barnet London Borough Council election =

1994 local election in England

- 5 May 1994

All 60 seats up for election to Barnet London Borough Council 31 seats needed for a majority
- Registered: 212,131
- Turnout: 96,313, 45.40% (▼4.60)

	First party	Second party	Third party
Party	Conservative	Labour	Liberal Democrats
Seats before	39	18	3
Seats won	29	25	6
Seat change	▼10	▲7	▲3
Popular vote	101,251	110,569	52,916
Percentage	37.61%	41.07%	19.66%
Swing	▼12.19	▲4.95	▲8.80
- Map of the results of the 1994 Barnet London Borough council election. Conservatives in blue, Labour in red and Liberal Democrats in yellow..
Council control before election
Conservative
Council control after election
No overall control

The 1994 Barnet Council election took place on 5 May 1994 to elect members of Barnet London Borough Council in London, England. The whole council was up for election and the council went in no overall control.

Following the elections, a Labour-Liberal Democrat coalition was formed, replacing the previous Conservative majority.

== Election result ==
Overall turnout in the election was 45.4%.

1994 Barnet London Borough Council local elections
Party	Seats	Gains	Losses	Net gain/loss	Seats %	Votes %	Votes	+/−
Conservative	29	0	10	▼10	48.33	37.61	101,251	▼12.19
Labour	25	7	0	▲7	41.67	41.07	110,569	▲4.95
Liberal Democrats	6	3	0	▲3	10.00	19.66	52,916	▲8.80
Green	0	0	0	Steady	0.00	1.46	3,940	▼0.65
Independent	0	0	0	Steady	0.00	0.15	406	▼0.44
Natural Law Party	0	0	0	Steady	0.00	0.05	120	New
Total	60						269,202	

== Ward results ==
=== Arkley ===
Arkley (3)
Party	Candidate	Votes	%	±%
Labour	Anita Campbell*	2,852	49.94	▲6.82
Labour	Pamela Coleman*	2,701		
Labour	Linda McFadyen	2,574		
Conservative	Jonathan Kay	1,854	33.40	▼7.59
Conservative	Jeremy Cameron	1,838		
Conservative	Arik Yacobi	1,744		
Liberal Democrats	Mary Barnett	975	16.66	▲3.98
Liberal Democrats	Victor Godman	869		
Liberal Democrats	Michael Cleal	867		
Registered electors		11,636		▼339
Turnout		5,740	49.32	▼1.09
Rejected ballots		19	0.33	▲0.14
Labour hold				
Labour hold				
Labour hold				

=== Brunswick Park ===
Brunswick Park (3)
Party	Candidate	Votes	%	±%
Conservative	Donald Goodman*	1,985	45.51	▼10.53
Conservative	Irene Palmer*	1,834		
Conservative	John Rawles*	1,817		
Labour	Jeffrey Cohen	1,576	36.76	▲3.76
Labour	Bridget Griffin	1,505		
Labour	Ian Wallace	1,472		
Liberal Democrats	Peter Finlayson	785	17.73	▲6.77
Liberal Democrats	Alwena Lillywhite	723		
Liberal Democrats	Yvonne Wicksteed	688		
Registered electors		10,351		▼229
Turnout		4,433	42.83	▼3.61
Rejected ballots		16	0.36	▲0.18
Conservative hold				
Conservative hold				
Conservative hold				

=== Burnt Oak ===
Burnt Oak (3)
Party	Candidate	Votes	%	±%
Labour	Rosemary Carney	2,754	72.20	▲16.75
Labour	Alan Williams*	2,722		
Labour	Allan Turner* (Note: Turner replaced Cllr Malcolm Sargeant after his resignation in 1991)	2,703		
Conservative	Keith Dyall	525	13.33	▼13.69
Conservative	Patricia Sparrow	504		
Conservative	Alan Maund	481		
Liberal Democrats	Barbara Farbey	340	8.52	▲1.12
Liberal Democrats	Cyril Harris	324		
Liberal Democrats	Diana Pattison	301		
Green	Anne Doyle	225	5.96	▼4.17
Registered electors		9,452		▼249
Turnout		4,044	42.78	▼1.85
Rejected ballots		7	0.17	▲0.17
Labour hold				
Labour hold				
Labour hold				

=== Childs Hill ===
Childs Hill (3)
Party	Candidate	Votes	%	±%
Liberal Democrats	Jack Cohen*	1,986	51.34	▲12.59
Liberal Democrats	Susette Palmer	1,887		
Liberal Democrats	Jonathan Davies	1,765		
Conservative	Abraham Dunner	1,172	28.61	▼3.88
Conservative	Dineshwar Singh	986		
Conservative	Robert Halfon	984		
Labour	Anthony Hulstrom	760	20.05	▼2.53
Labour	Ghada Karmi	732		
Labour	Bryan Reith	710		
Registered electors		8,802		▲51
Turnout		3,885	44.14	▼6.60
Rejected ballots		9	0.23	▲0.23
Liberal Democrats hold				
Liberal Democrats hold				
Liberal Democrats hold				

=== Colindale ===
Colindale (3)
Party	Candidate	Votes	%	±%
Labour	Ellis Hillman*	2,588	64.76	▲17.38
Labour	David Williams*	2,553		
Labour	Gillian Sargeant	2,450		
Conservative	Alan Scott	747	18.13	▼4.03
Conservative	Philip Williams	690		
Conservative	Robert Linton	688		
Liberal Democrats	Mary Dodd	430	10.13	▲3.58
Liberal Democrats	Arthur Roycroft	389		
Liberal Democrats	David Keech	368		
Green	Norman Crisp	273	6.99	▼1.99
Registered electors		10,336		▲482
Turnout		4,106	39.73	▼3.42
Rejected ballots		9	0.22	▲0.13
Labour hold				
Labour hold				
Labour hold				

=== East Barnet ===
East Barnet (3)
Party	Candidate	Votes	%	±%
Labour	Elizabeth Jarvis	2,331	44.00	▲4.38
Labour	Usha Chopra	2,222		
Labour	Richard Soer	2,175		
Conservative	Olwen Evans*	1,992	36.04	▼9.44
Conservative	Jihad Anani*	1,779		
Conservative	Frixos Tombolis	1,740		
Liberal Democrats	Margaret Neil	1,120	19.96	▲9.11
Liberal Democrats	Peter Watkins	1,010		
Liberal Democrats	Charles Wicksteed	922		
Registered electors		11,130		▲332
Turnout		5,373	48.27	▼1.31
Rejected ballots		5	0.09	▲0.10
Labour gain from Conservative				
Labour gain from Conservative				
Labour gain from Conservative				

=== East Finchley ===
East Finchley (3)
Party	Candidate	Votes	%	±%
Labour	Joan Ryan*	3,416	58.64	▼6.01
Labour	Helen Gordon	3,340		
Labour	Rudi Vis*	3,203		
Conservative	Daniel Finkelstein	1,187	20.26	▼15.09
Conservative	Barry Antoniou	1,138		
Conservative	Marc Landsman	1,115		
Green	Noel Lynch	624	11.02	New
Liberal Democrats	Elinor Edwards	595	10.08	New
Liberal Democrats	Diana Darrer	582		
Liberal Democrats	Thomas Darrer	534		
Registered electors		11,026		▼83
Turnout		5,609	50.87	▼2.18
Rejected ballots		6	0.11	▼0.52
Labour hold				
Labour hold				
Labour hold				

=== Edgware ===
Edgware (3)
Party	Candidate	Votes	%	±%
Conservative	Julian Czarny*	2,098	48.74	▼10.24
Conservative	Malcolm Lester*	1,986		
Conservative	Joan Scannell	1,934		
Labour	Alan Sloam	1,430	33.64	▲8.09
Labour	Keith Hurcombe	1,387		
Labour	Zena Sloam	1,336		
Liberal Democrats	Susanne Gregory	754	17.62	▲10.01
Liberal Democrats	June Burton	741		
Liberal Democrats	Kathleen Lamprell	681		
Registered electors		11,145		▼31
Turnout		4,394	39.43	▼6.13
Rejected ballots		8	0.18	▼0.12
Conservative hold				
Conservative hold				
Conservative hold				

=== Finchley ===
Finchley (3)
Party	Candidate	Votes	%	±%
Conservative	Eva Greenspan*	2,285	48.69	▼8.01
Conservative	Leslie Sussman*	2,176		
Conservative	Barbara Langstone*	2,149		
Labour	Denis Calnan	1,384	30.12	▲1.42
Labour	Josephine Cuttell	1,369		
Labour	Mary McGuirk	1,337		
Liberal Democrats	Malcolm Blount	721	15.30	▲9.69
Liberal Democrats	Jasbir Singh	664		
Green	Gustav Clarkson	316	5.89	▼3.10
Green	Janet Strangeways	217		
Registered electors		9,871		▲114
Turnout		4,580	46.40	▼10.31
Rejected ballots		16	0.35	▲0.01
Conservative hold				
Conservative hold				
Conservative hold				

=== Friern Barnet ===
Friern Barnet (3)
Party	Candidate	Votes	%	±%
Conservative	Thomas Carter	2,242	46.71	▼6.18
Conservative	Brian Salinger*	2,198		
Conservative	John Tiplady*	2,179		
Labour	Roger Chapman	1,835	36.65	▼0.29
Labour	Simon Montague	1,741		
Labour	Michael Harris	1,617		
Liberal Democrats	Matthew Harris	827	16.65	▲6.48
Liberal Democrats	Jonathan Griffiths	774		
Liberal Democrats	Steven Deller	758		
Registered electors		10,672		▼124
Turnout		5,003	46.88	▼7.40
Rejected ballots		8	0.16	▼0.06
Conservative hold				
Conservative hold				
Conservative hold				

=== Garden Suburb ===
Garden Suburb (3)
Party	Candidate	Votes	%	±%
Conservative	Frank Davis*	1,748	43.52	▼16.08
Conservative	Roy Shutz*	1,724		
Conservative	Mohammed Khamisa* (Note: Khamisa replaced Cllr Veronica Soskin after her resignation in 1993)	1,665		
Liberal Democrats	Majorie Harris	1,645	39.96	▲20.68
Liberal Democrats	Millicent Watkins	1,552		
Liberal Democrats	David Ive	1,520		
Labour	Naomi Angell	668	16.52	▲5.17
Labour	Jula Westman	648		
Labour	Carol Kohll	634		
Registered electors		9,755		▲180
Turnout		4,121	42.25	▼9.01
Rejected ballots		14	0.34	▲0.28
Conservative hold				
Conservative hold				
Conservative hold				

=== Golders Green ===
Golders Green (3)
Party	Candidate	Votes	%	±%
Conservative	Melvin Cohen*	1,758	40.55	▲1.79
Conservative	John Hedge*	1,495		
Conservative	Michele Moulin	1,415		
Labour	Michael Doyle	1,218	29.86	▲1.64
Labour	Montague Miller	1,137		
Liberal Democrats	Barrie Manson	1,106	26.70	▲0.29
Labour	Dorothy Macedo	1,083		
Liberal Democrats	Michael Green	1,009		
Liberal Democrats	Rita Druiff	959		
Green	Miranda Dunn	125	2.89	▼3.72
Green	Karen Lansdowne	97		
Registered electors		9,875		▲390
Turnout		4,079	41.31	▼7.49
Rejected ballots		19	0.47	▲0.32
Conservative hold				
Conservative hold				
Conservative hold				

=== Hadley ===
Hadley (3)
Party	Candidate	Votes	%	±%
Conservative	Mark Hayball	2,377	34.05	▼4.96
Conservative	Hazel Mammatt*	2,339		
Conservative	Kantilal Patel	2,037		
Labour	Michael Campbell	1,961	29.05	▲8.25
Labour	Jean Feldman	1,915		
Labour	David Clarke	1,885		
Liberal Democrats	Sean Hooker	1,523	21.50	▲12.26
Liberal Democrats	Trevor Orr	1,479		
Liberal Democrats	Brigid Povah	1,263		
Green	Timothy Riley	612	9.26	▼0.43
Independent	Christopher Johnson	406	6.14	New
Registered electors		13,596		▼322
Turnout		6,298	46.32	▼4.61
Rejected ballots		5	0.08	▲0.01
Conservative hold				
Conservative hold				
Conservative hold				

=== Hale ===
Hale (3)
Party	Candidate	Votes	%	±%
Conservative	Leslie Pym*	1,914	42.58	▼7.76
Conservative	Sheila Scott*	1,859		
Labour	Andrew Dickie	1,820	40.07	▲9.09
Conservative	Graham Old	1,726		
Labour	Janet Heathfield	1,701		
Labour	William Parnaby	1,653		
Liberal Democrats	James Creighton	788	17.35	▲8.11
Liberal Democrats	Guy Patton	730		
Liberal Democrats	Geoffrey Jacobs	723		
Registered electors		9,821		▼162
Turnout		4,636	47.20	▲4.03
Rejected ballots		7	0.15	▲0.09
Conservative hold				
Conservative hold				
Labour gain from Conservative				

=== Hendon ===
Hendon (3)
Party	Candidate	Votes	%	±%
Conservative	Anthony Finn*	2,036	43.37	▼14.82
Conservative	Frederick Poole*	1,823		
Conservative	Edward Bunn*	1,791		
Labour	Colin Francombe	1,464	30.90	▼1.13
Labour	David Simons	1,302		
Labour	Alan Killingback	1,260		
Liberal Democrats	Fiona Palmer	852	18.25	▲8.47
Liberal Democrats	Harold Defries	825		
Liberal Democrats	Martin Rodwell	700		
Green	Graham White	325	7.48	New
Registered electors		11,183		▲461
Turnout		4,481	40.07	▼7.08
Rejected ballots		35	0.78	▲0.60
Conservative hold				
Conservative hold				
Conservative hold				

=== Mill Hill ===
Mill Hill (3)
Party	Candidate	Votes	%	±%
Liberal Democrats	Sheila Gottsche	1,836	40.52	▲30.17
Liberal Democrats	Jeremy Davies	1,830		
Liberal Democrats	Wayne Casey	1,817		
Conservative	John Hart*	1,795	39.00	▼16.17
Conservative	Jane Ellison* (Note: Ellison replaced Cllr Denis Dippel after his death in 1991)	1,781		
Conservative	Peter Holland	1,701		
Labour	Jean Smith	939	20.48	▼4.72
Labour	George Janeway	923		
Labour	Michael Epstein	910		
Registered electors		10,717		▼307
Turnout		4,751	44.33	▼2.89
Rejected ballots		6	0.13	▲0.09
Liberal Democrats gain from Conservative				
Liberal Democrats gain from Conservative				
Liberal Democrats gain from Conservative				

=== St Paul’s ===
St Paul’s (3)
Party	Candidate	Votes	%	±%
Labour	Kitty Lyons	2,553	45.97	▲9.25
Labour	Katherine McGuirk	2,476		
Labour	James Tierney	2,428		
Conservative	Helena Hart*	2,148	39.56	▼0.82
Conservative	Mike Freer*	2,143		
Conservative	Mary Phillips*	2,126		
Liberal Democrats	Joan Beales	514	9.19	New
Liberal Democrats	John Beales	503		
Liberal Democrats	David Loxton	473		
Green	Maureen Colmans	322	5.29	▼8.15
Green	Ashley Gunstock	314		
Green	Dennis Vigay	222		
Registered electors		10,142		▲94
Turnout		5,669	55.90	▼2.50
Rejected ballots		8	0.14	▼0.13
Labour gain from Conservative				
Labour gain from Conservative				
Labour gain from Conservative				

=== Totteridge ===
Totteridge (3)
Party	Candidate	Votes	%	±%
Conservative	Victor Lyon*	2,259	47.69	▼7.56
Conservative	Victor Usher*	2,218		
Conservative	Kevin Edson	2,180		
Labour	Timothy Roberts	1,492	31.32	▲5.10
Labour	David Saxon	1,441		
Labour	Victoria Spawls	1,439		
Liberal Democrats	Jennifer Keech	863	18.41	▲9.00
Liberal Democrats	Bernadette Cleal	853		
Liberal Democrats	Nicholas Sullivan	853		
Natural Law Party	Diane Derksen	120	2.58	New
Registered electors		11,092		▲112
Turnout		4,829	43.54	▼5.74
Rejected ballots		12	0.25	▲0.05
Conservative hold				
Conservative hold				
Conservative hold				

=== West Hendon ===
West Hendon (3)
Party	Candidate	Votes	%	±%
Labour	Gina Marks* (Note: Marks replaced Cllr Timothy Sims after his resignation in 1993)	2,008	52.80	▲3.17
Labour	Agnes Slocombe*	1,968		
Labour	Nicholas Kissen	1,941		
Conservative	David Berens	1,070	27.05	▼14.55
Conservative	David Twomey	1,004		
Conservative	Susan Twomey	957		
Liberal Democrats	Erika Coward	500	12.98	▲4.21
Liberal Democrats	Richard Coward	500		
Liberal Democrats	Shirley Rodwell	455		
Green	Fiona Clode	268	7.17	New
Registered electors		10,138		▲13
Turnout		3,964	39.10	▼6.80
Rejected ballots		20	0.50	▲0.24
Labour hold				
Labour hold				
Labour hold				

=== Woodhouse ===
Woodhouse (3)
Party	Candidate	Votes	%	±%
Labour	Stanley Cross*	3,084	52.80	▲1.71
Labour	Melanie Packer	2,928		
Labour	Joanna Salsbury	2,915		
Conservative	Brian Coleman	2,093	36.17	▼12.74
Conservative	Mary Russell	2,036		
Conservative	Peter Yallouros	1,986		
Liberal Democrats	Rosalind Abrahams	666	11.03	New
Liberal Democrats	Geoffrey Lee	614		
Liberal Democrats	Joy Manson	585		
Registered electors		11,931		▼341
Turnout		6,318	52.95	▼1.79
Rejected ballots		18	0.28	▼0.33
Labour hold				
Labour hold				
Labour hold				
