= 1964 Barnet London Borough Council election =

1964 local election in England

7 May 1964	1968 →

All 56 seats to Barnet London Borough Council 29 seats needed for a majority
- Turnout: 46.1

	First party	Second party	Third party
Party	Conservative	Labour	Liberal
Seats won	37	13	6
Percentage	43.5%	28.7%	27.1%
Council control before election
Not applicable
Council control after election
Conservative

The 1964 Barnet Council election took place on 7 May 1964 to elect members of Barnet London Borough Council in London, England. The whole council was up for election and the Conservative party gained control of the council.

These elections were the first to the newly formed borough. Previously elections had taken place in the Municipal Borough of Finchley, Municipal Borough of Hendon, Barnet Urban District, East Barnet Urban District and Friern Barnet Urban District. These boroughs and districts were joined to form the new London Borough of Barnet by the London Government Act 1963.

A total of 175 candidates stood in the election for the 56 seats being contested across 30 wards. These included a full slate from the Conservative and Labour parties, while the Liberals stood at least one candidate in each ward. Other candidates included 7 from the Communist Party and 1 independent. There were 13 three-seat wards (the former boroughs of Finchley and Hendon) and 17 one-seat wards (the former urban districts of Barnet, East Barnet and Friern Barnet).

This election also had aldermen as well as directly elected councillors. The Conservatives got 6 aldermen, Labour 2 and the Liberals 1.

The Council was elected in 1964 as a "shadow authority" but did not start operations until 1 April 1965.

== Election result ==
The results saw the Conservatives gain the new council with a majority of 24 after winning 37 of the 56 seats. Overall turnout in the election was 46.1%. This turnout included 1,332 postal votes.

Barnet local election result 1964
Party	Seats	Gains	Losses	Net gain/loss	Seats %	Votes %	Votes	+/−
Conservative	37	37	0	+37	66.1	43.5	99,525	+43.5
Labour	13	13	0	+13	23.2	28.7	65,676	+28.7
Liberal	6	6	0	+6	10.7	27.1	61,975	+27.1
Communist	0	0	0	0	0.0	0.4	904	+0.4
Independent	0	0	0	0	0.0	0.2	548	+0.2

== Ward results ==
=== Arkley East ===
Arkley East (1 seat)
Party	Candidate	Votes	%	±%
Labour	Mrs. C. D. Hopkins	678		
Conservative	E. V. Griffin	674		
Liberal	N. H. Morris	351		
Turnout		1,705	51.1	
Labour win (new seat)				

=== Arkley West ===
Arkley West (1 seat)
Party	Candidate	Votes	%	±%
Labour	Mrs. J. E. Pudney	772		
Conservative	Kenneth A. Ainsworth	648		
Liberal	Mrs. J. K. Briveau	145		
Turnout		1,564	45.9	
Labour win (new seat)				

=== Barnet North ===
Barnet North (1 seat)
Party	Candidate	Votes	%	±%
Conservative	Ernest Cheason	690		
Independent	D. G. Cheeseman	548		
Labour	Mrs. A. H. Mealing	510		
Liberal	K. J. Fowler	272		
Turnout		2,037	55.1	
Conservative win (new seat)				

=== Barnet South ===
Barnet South (1 seat)
Party	Candidate	Votes	%	±%
Conservative	Percy George Henry Woodruff	1,111		
Liberal	K. W. R. Burrough	623		
Labour	E. P. Gardner	598		
Turnout		2,335	47.7	
Conservative win (new seat)				

=== Brunswick Park ===
Brunswick Park (1 seat)
Party	Candidate	Votes	%	±%
Labour	M. B. Passingham	1,145		
Liberal	E. L. Knight	948		
Conservative	B. Gibbs	883		
Turnout		2,983	60.2	
Labour win (new seat)				

=== Burnt Oak ===
Burnt Oak (3 seats)
Party	Candidate	Votes	%	±%
Labour	J. S. Champion	3,094		
Labour	A. Paul	3,039		
Labour	R. Robinson	2,999		
Conservative	G. Leach	387		
Conservative	Mrs. G. Holland	378		
Conservative	Miss S. Risdon	374		
Liberal	Miss J. Allen	143		
Liberal	D. Martindale	135		
Communist	A. Legg	116		
Turnout		3,666	34.7	
Labour win (new seat)				
Labour win (new seat)				
Labour win (new seat)				

=== Child's Hill ===
Child's Hill (3 seats)
Party	Candidate	Votes	%	±%
Conservative	K. W. Hughes	1,829		
Conservative	A. Young	1,825		
Conservative	N. R. Sutton	1,811		
Labour	Mrs. M. C. Tyler	1,310		
Labour	R. Collins	1,307		
Labour	R. D. Harvey	1,284		
Liberal	L. W. Bailey	867		
Liberal	A. D. Mercer	863		
Liberal	Mrs. J. D. Caine	860		
Turnout		4,059	38.2	
Conservative win (new seat)				
Conservative win (new seat)				
Conservative win (new seat)				

=== Cockfosters ===
Cockfosters (1 seat)
Party	Candidate	Votes	%	±%
Labour	G. A. J. Gunning	805		
Conservative	A. W. P. Fawcett	605		
Liberal	Mrs. B. M. Craymer	386		
Turnout		1,797	54.4	
Labour win (new seat)				

=== East Barnet ===
East Barnet (1 seat)
Party	Candidate	Votes	%	±%
Conservative	A. Cutts-Watson	1,043		
Labour	R. H. Mann	722		
Liberal	S. A. Davis	519		
Turnout		2,289	54.4	
Conservative win (new seat)				

=== Edgware ===
Edgware (3 seats)
Party	Candidate	Votes	%	±%
Conservative	J. Felton	2,564		
Conservative	H. R. Brooks	2,537		
Conservative	R. Porcas	2,406		
Labour	Mrs. P. Moyse	1,831		
Labour	D. Goldman	1,821		
Labour	M. Katz	1,804		
Liberal	M. Ingram	873		
Liberal	John Holmes	857		
Liberal	Oswald Rosalki	839		
Communist	W. Wayne	145		
Turnout		5,200	39.0	
Conservative win (new seat)				
Conservative win (new seat)				
Conservative win (new seat)				

=== Finchley Central ===
Finchley Central (3 seats)
Party	Candidate	Votes	%	±%
Conservative	Norman James Sapsted	2,615		
Conservative	Leslie George Snelling	2,578		
Conservative	Keith M Klean	2,565		
Liberal	J. S. Hill	1,706		
Liberal	H.A. Allwood	1,666		
Liberal	L.W. Watkins	1,636		
Labour	N. Birch	1,405		
Labour	B. Quinn	1,291		
Labour	Mrs. M. Root	1,250		
Communist	A. Winsloe	118		
Turnout		5,710	46.5	
Conservative win (new seat)				
Conservative win (new seat)				
Conservative win (new seat)				

=== Finchley East ===
Finchley East (3 seats)
Party	Candidate	Votes	%	±%
Liberal	J. W. Webb	2,359		
Liberal	Alan D. Cohen	2,303		
Liberal	Anthony H. Tibber	2,280		
Conservative	M. King	2,024		
Conservative	R. A. F. Ferguson	1,895		
Conservative	K. A. Bexley	1,886		
Labour	J. W. Watkins	1,571		
Labour	D. R. Allen	1,502		
Labour	Yvonne Sieve	1,475		
Communist	L. E. Segal	187		
Turnout		5,986	48.9	
Liberal win (new seat)				
Liberal win (new seat)				
Liberal win (new seat)				

=== Finchley North ===
Finchley North (3 seats)
Party	Candidate	Votes	%	±%
Conservative	William George Hart	2,751		
Conservative	Frank Dale Gibson	2,720		
Conservative	Victor Howard Usher	2,703		
Liberal	C. A. Roberts	2,051		
Liberal	Douglas Robert Creed	2,009		
Liberal	Alexander N R Gunn	1,842		
Labour	G. Dunn	1,148		
Labour	J. Burke	984		
Labour	S. Wills	937		
Communist	B. Shore	137		
Turnout		5,867	51.8	
Conservative win (new seat)				
Conservative win (new seat)				
Conservative win (new seat)				

=== Finchley West ===
Finchley West (3 seats)
Party	Candidate	Votes	%	±%
Liberal	J. Murray Medway	3,184		
Liberal	Leonard Sattin	3,092		
Liberal	Frank Davis	3,087		
Conservative	F. W. Riches	2,840		
Conservative	V. S. Francis	2,771		
Conservative	C. E. White	2,693		
Labour	Mrs. R. Y. Green	800		
Labour	Mrs. S. H. Harris	795		
Labour	W. Maycock	786		
Turnout		6,820	54.9	
Liberal win (new seat)				
Liberal win (new seat)				
Liberal win (new seat)				

=== Friern Barnet Central ===
Friern Barnet Central (1 seat)
Party	Candidate	Votes	%	±%
Labour	Albert Edward Tomlinson	654		
Conservative	J. E. Pickering	567		
Liberal	J. Walters	437		
Turnout		1,665	51.4	
Labour win (new seat)				

=== Friern Barnet East ===
Friern Barnet East (1 seat)
Party	Candidate	Votes	%	±%
Conservative	G. H. Flesher	985		
Liberal	K. E. Ruge	842		
Labour	Mrs. L. F. Spaul	225		
Turnout		2,058	56.2	
Conservative win (new seat)				

=== Friern Barnet North ===
Friern Barnet North (1 seat)
Party	Candidate	Votes	%	±%
Conservative	W. H. Tangye	1,108		
Liberal	A. H. J. Parsons	252		
Labour	Mrs. B. M. Slade	172		
Turnout		1,536	45.8	
Conservative win (new seat)				

=== Friern Barnet South ===
Friern Barnet South (1 seat)
Party	Candidate	Votes	%	±%
Labour	E. C. George	884		
Conservative	P. J. Van der Spiegel	504		
Liberal	H. C. Bass	327		
Turnout		1,718	41.3	
Labour win (new seat)				

=== Friern Barnet West ===
Friern Barnet West (1 seat)
Party	Candidate	Votes	%	±%
Conservative	Mrs. E. Constable	1,213		
Liberal	K. J. Norman	981		
Labour	D. A. James	235		
Turnout		2,436	56.7	
Conservative win (new seat)				

=== Garden Suburb ===
Garden Suburb (3 seats)
Party	Candidate	Votes	%	±%
Conservative	F. A. Sharman	2,089		
Conservative	P. D. Mendel	2,027		
Conservative	R. J. Finigan	1,954		
Liberal	Quintin Joseph Iwi	1,424		
Liberal	Jean Mary Henderson	1,422		
Liberal	Mrs. P. K. H. Young	1,300		
Labour	Mrs. N. McGregor	580		
Labour	Mrs. M. Shields	577		
Labour	Miss I. Stearn	552		
Communist	J. W. Pinder	173		
Turnout		4,123	44.7	
Conservative win (new seat)				
Conservative win (new seat)				
Conservative win (new seat)				

=== Golders Green ===
Golders Green (3 seats)
Party	Candidate	Votes	%	±%
Conservative	Mrs. R. A. Freedman	1,678		
Conservative	C. F. Harris	1,652		
Conservative	G. J. Dickins	1,603		
Labour	Mrs. J. Miller	1,548		
Labour	Mrs. B. R. Scharf	1,524		
Labour	T. H. Barnes	1,389		
Liberal	E. B. Davis	932		
Liberal	Philip L. Smulian	895		
Liberal	Mrs. P. Fiander	849		
Turnout		4,165	41.4	
Conservative win (new seat)				
Conservative win (new seat)				
Conservative win (new seat)				

=== Hadley ===
Hadley (1 seat)
Party	Candidate	Votes	%	±%
Conservative	G. H. Jobbins	941		
Liberal	R. F. Williamson	643		
Labour	J. D. O’Brien	339		
Turnout		1,924	50.7	
Conservative win (new seat)				

=== Hendon Central ===
Hendon Central (3 seats)
Party	Candidate	Votes	%	±%
Conservative	Leslie A Hills	2,509		
Conservative	W. Lloyd-Taylor	2,446		
Conservative	T. Stewart	2,375		
Liberal	D. T. Baron	1,804		
Liberal	K. Farrow	1,804		
Liberal	I. Scott	1,797		
Labour	R. Snowdon	822		
Labour	D. Wilkes	812		
Labour	R. Lyons	805		
Turnout		5,129	45.0	
Conservative win (new seat)				
Conservative win (new seat)				
Conservative win (new seat)				

=== Lyonsdown ===
Lyonsdown (1 seat)
Party	Candidate	Votes	%	±%
Conservative	E. A. E. Asker	1,214		
Liberal	D. Redmond	460		
Labour	Mrs. M. Rilstone	255		
Turnout		1,931	48.9	
Conservative win (new seat)				

=== Mill Hill ===
Mill Hill (3 seats)
Party	Candidate	Votes	%	±%
Conservative	Mrs. Clara M. Thubrun	4,542		
Conservative	A. P. Fletcher	4,411		
Conservative	D. F. Simons	4,308		
Labour	Mrs. M. Nissel	1,671		
Labour	W. Marlow	1,663		
Labour	H. Zion	1,570		
Liberal	Mrs. A. Price-Davies	1,366		
Liberal	O. Williams	1,252		
Liberal	A. Gilbey	1,214		
Turnout		7,521	44.7	
Conservative win (new seat)				
Conservative win (new seat)				
Conservative win (new seat)				

=== New Barnet ===
New Barnet (1 seat)
Party	Candidate	Votes	%	±%
Labour	W. Seagroatt	829		
Conservative	R. L. Biddle	547		
Liberal	D. G. Sexton	283		
Communist	B. Marcus	28		
Turnout		1,695	48.8	
Labour win (new seat)				

=== Osidge ===
Osidge (1 seat)
Party	Candidate	Votes	%	±%
Conservative	R. B. Lewis	1,431		
Liberal	W. J. Lee	1,155		
Labour	N. Langford	256		
Turnout		2,849	53.6	
Conservative win (new seat)				

=== Park ===
Park (3 seats)
Party	Candidate	Votes	%	±%
Conservative	J. Gordon-Lee	1,836		
Conservative	Mrs. N. I. Cullinane	1,808		
Conservative	John W Shock	1,763		
Labour	B. A. Le Mare	1,456		
Labour	Mrs. R. Jobson	1,409		
Labour	H. Rayner	1,407		
Liberal	P. Meyer	950		
Liberal	S. Shipton	897		
Liberal	K. Brown	895		
Turnout		4,260	40.9	
Conservative win (new seat)				
Conservative win (new seat)				
Conservative win (new seat)				

=== Totteridge ===
Totteridge (1 seat)
Party	Candidate	Votes	%	±%
Conservative	B. M. Franklin	1,323		
Liberal	J. I. Karet	261		
Labour	V. G. Marchesi	191		
Turnout		1,776	44.8	
Conservative win (new seat)				

=== West Hendon ===
West Hendon (3 seats)
Party	Candidate	Votes	%	±%
Labour	B. E. McCormack	2,132		
Labour	F. L. Tyler	2,064		
Labour	L. Marks	1,992		
Conservative	Miss G. O’Connell	1,017		
Conservative	Mrs. J. Partridge	945		
Conservative	A. G. Risdon	923		
Liberal	B. S. Wrigley	559		
Liberal	S. Saunders	543		
Liberal	P. Price	535		
Turnout		3,637	36.3	
Labour win (new seat)				
Labour win (new seat)				
Labour win (new seat)				

== By-elections between 1964 and 1968 ==
There were no by-elections.
