= Burnt Oak (ward) =

Electoral ward in the London borough of Barnet

- Electoral ward for the Barnet London Borough Council
- Burnt Oak ward boundaries since 2022
- Borough: Barnet
- County: Greater London
- Population: 21,857 (2021) (Note: 2021 Census data reported for 2022 ward boundaries)
- Electorate: 13,436 (2022)
- Major settlements: Burnt Oak
- Area: 2.546 square kilometres (0.983 sq mi)

Current electoral ward
- Created: 1965
- Number of members: 3
- Councillors: Sara Conway; Kamal Gurung; Charlotte Daus
- GSS code: E05000044 (2002–2022); E05013630 (2022–present)

Burnt Oak is an electoral ward in the London Borough of Barnet. The ward has existed since the creation of the borough on 1 April 1965 and was first used in the 1964 elections. It returns three councillors to Barnet London Borough Council. The ward covers the Burnt Oak area. It was subject to boundary revisions in 1968, 1978, 2002 and 2022. The ward has only returned councillors standing as Labour Party candidates. Former councillor Gerald Shamash was appointed a member of the House of Lords in 2024.

== Barnet council elections since 2022 ==
There was a revision of ward boundaries in Barnet in 2022. Burnt Oak gained territory from Edgware and Hale wards and lost territory to the new ward of Colindale North.

=== 2025 by-election ===
The by-election took place on 13 February 2025, following the resignation of Ammar Naqvi.

2025 Burnt Oak by-election
Party	Candidate	Votes	%	±%
Labour	Charlotte Daus	1,064	45.0	−18.2
Conservative	Kevin Ghateh	501	21.2	−2.7
Reform	Sury Khatri	434	18.4	+18.4
Green	Gabrielle Bailey	202	8.6	−4.3
Liberal Democrats	Altan Akbiyik	93	3.9	+3.9
Rejoin EU	Charles Honderick	68	2.9	+2.9
Majority		563	23.8	
Turnout		2,362		
Labour hold		Swing		

=== 2022 election ===
The election took place on 5 May 2022.

2022 Barnet London Borough Council election: Burnt Oak
Party	Candidate	Votes	%	±%
Labour	Sara Conway	2,545	69.1	
Labour	Kamal Gurung	2,377	64.5	
Labour	Ammar Naqvi	2,105	57.1	
Conservative	Ruth Hart	962	26.1	
Conservative	Timothy McGeever	861	23.4	
Conservative	Samuel Shupac	736	20.0	
Green	Rashina Shah	520	14.1	
Turnout		3,684	27.4	
Labour win (new boundaries)				
Labour win (new boundaries)				
Labour win (new boundaries)				

== 2002–2022 Barnet council elections ==
Burnt Oak ward boundaries from 2002 to 2022

There was a revision of ward boundaries in Barnet in 2002.

=== 2018 election ===
The election took place on 3 May 2018.

2018 Barnet London Borough Council election: Burnt Oak
Party	Candidate	Votes	%	±%
Labour	Sara Conway	2,440	63.3	−0.5
Labour	Charlie O'Macauley	2,321	60.2	+6.1
Labour	Ammar Naqvi	2,320	60.2	+7.2
Conservative	Jack Aaron	985	25.6	+4.0
Conservative	Nicole Richer	892	23.1	+2.3
Conservative	Ekaterina Dragomirova	755	19.6	+3.8
Green	Ben Samuel	364	9.4	−1.5
Liberal Democrats	Robin Marks	253	6.6	−0.4
Liberal Democrats	Millicent Watkins	187	4.9	−1.0
Liberal Democrats	Mosa Zahed	129	3.3	−0.4
Turnout		3,854	32.6	
Labour hold		Swing		
Labour hold		Swing		
Labour hold		Swing		

=== 2014 election ===
The election took place on 22 May 2014.

2014 Barnet London Borough Council election: Burnt Oak
Party	Candidate	Votes	%	±%
Labour	Claire Farrier	2,622	63.8	+4.8
Labour	Charlie O’Macauley	2,223	54.1	+0.3
Labour	Ammar Naqvi	2,177	53.0	−5.6
Conservative	Lachhya Gurung	889	21.6	−0.3
Conservative	John Connolly	854	20.8	+0.1
Conservative	Richa Karnani	651	15.8	−3.8
Green	Maggie Curati	447	10.9	N/A
Independent	Bidemi Alabi	328	8.0	N/A
Liberal Democrats	Michael Roberts	286	7.0	−6.0
Liberal Democrats	Diana Iwi	242	5.9	−8.9
Liberal Democrats	Yahaya Kiyingi	152	3.7	−9.0
Total votes		4,110		
Labour hold		Swing		
Labour hold		Swing		
Labour hold		Swing		

=== 2010 election ===
The election on 6 May 2010 took place on the same day as the United Kingdom general election.

2010 Barnet London Borough Council election: Burnt Oak
Party	Candidate	Votes	%	±%
Labour	Claire Farrier	3,541	59.0	−5.9
Labour	Alex Brodkin	3,519	58.6	−0.3
Labour	Charlie O'Macauley	3,230	53.8	−3.6
Conservative	Keith Dyall	1,315	21.9	+4.1
Conservative	Pat Sparrow	1,241	20.7	+3.4
Conservative	Michael Martin	1,179	19.6	+3.3
Liberal Democrats	Karen Hatchett	890	14.8	+2.9
Liberal Democrats	Michael Roberts	780	13.0	+2.1
Liberal Democrats	Henryk Feszczur	760	12.7	+0.8
Turnout		6,005	54.6	+22.2
Labour hold		Swing		
Labour hold		Swing		
Labour hold		Swing		

=== 2006 election ===
The election took place on 4 May 2006.

2006 Barnet London Borough Council election: Burnt Oak
Party	Candidate	Votes	%	±%
Labour	Claire Farrier	2,078	64.9	−4.7
Labour	Linda McFadyen	1,886	58.9	−3.3
Labour	Charlie O-Macauley	1,836	57.4	−11.4
Conservative	Rene Braun	571	17.8	+0.7
Conservative	Patricia Sparrow	555	17.3	−0.4
Conservative	William Nicholson	522	16.3	−0.8
Liberal Democrats	Henry Feszczur	381	11.9	+8.5
Liberal Democrats	Jason Moleman	349	10.9	+4.9
Liberal Democrats	Diana Iwi	348	10.9	+4.9
Green	Andrea Poppy	329	10.3	+2.2
Turnout		3,201	32.4	+8.1
Labour hold		Swing		
Labour hold		Swing		
Labour hold		Swing		

=== 2003 by-election ===
The by-election took place on 19 June 2003, following the resignation of Alan Williams.

2003 Burnt Oak by-election
Party	Candidate	Votes	%	±%
Labour	Claire Farrier	1,774	76.0	+7.2
Conservative	Sachin Rajput	329	14.1	−3.6
Liberal Democrats	Diana Iwi	178	7.6	+1.6
Green	Edelgard Vaswani	53	2.3	−5.8
Majority		1,445	61.9	
Turnout		2,334	23.2	−1.1
Labour hold		Swing		

=== 2002 election ===
The election took place on 2 May 2002.

2002 Barnet London Borough Council election: Burnt Oak
Party	Candidate	Votes	%	±%
Labour	Allan Turner	1,675	69.6	
Labour	Alan Williams	1,657	68.8	
Labour	Linda McFadyen	1,496	62.2	
Conservative	Patricia Sparrow	426	17.7	
Conservative	Joanne Williams	412	17.1	
Conservative	Rene Braun	411	17.1	
Green	Audrey Poppy	194	8.1	
Liberal Democrats	Michael Roberts	145	6.0	
Liberal Democrats	Karen Hatchett	144	6.0	
Liberal Democrats	Hewryk Freszczur	82	3.4	
Turnout		2,407	24.3	
Labour win (new boundaries)				
Labour win (new boundaries)				
Labour win (new boundaries)				

== 1978–2002 Barnet council elections ==
Burnt Oak ward boundaries from 1978 to 2002

There was a revision of ward boundaries in Barnet in 1978.

=== 1998 election ===
The election took place on 7 May 1998.

1998 Barnet London Borough Council election: Burnt Oak
Party	Candidate	Votes	%	±%
Labour	Allan Turner	1,844	70.1	+3.1
Labour	Alan Williams	1,830	69.6	+2.2
Labour	Linda McFadyen	1,615	61.4	−6.8
Conservative	Peter Edwards	430	16.3	+3.8
Conservative	Urmil Bhatt	317	12.1	+0.2
Conservative	Keith Dyall	316	12.0	−1.0
Liberal Democrats	Andrew Packer	289	11.0	+2.6
Liberal Democrats	Karen Hatchett	215	8.2	+0.2
Liberal Democrats	Henryk Feszczur	159	6.0	−1.5
Turnout		2,649	27.4	
Labour hold		Swing		
Labour hold		Swing		
Labour hold		Swing		

=== 1994 election ===
The election took place on 5 May 1994.

1994 Barnet London Borough Council election: Burnt Oak
Party	Candidate	Votes	%	±%
Labour	Rosemary Carney	2,754	72.20	▲16.75
Labour	Alan Williams	2,722		
Labour	Allan Turner	2,703		
Conservative	Keith Dyall	525	13.33	▼13.69
Conservative	Patricia Sparrow	504		
Conservative	Alan Maund	481		
Liberal Democrats	Barbara Farbey	340	8.52	▲1.12
Liberal Democrats	Cyril Harris	324		
Liberal Democrats	Diana Pattison	301		
Green	Anne Doyle	225	5.96	▼4.17
Registered electors		9,452		▼249
Turnout		4,044	42.78	▼1.85
Rejected ballots		7	0.17	▲0.17
Labour hold		Swing		
Labour hold		Swing		
Labour hold		Swing		

=== 1991 by-election ===
A by-election took place on 6 June 1991, following the resignation of Malcolm Sargeant.

1991 Burnt Oak by-election
Party	Candidate	Votes	%	±%
Labour	Allan Turner	2,108	64.5	
Conservative	Oliver Stone	618	18.9	
Liberal Democrats	Joanne Cross	432	13.2	
Green	Dorothy Lewis	112	3.4	
Turnout			34.3	
Labour hold		Swing		

=== 1990 election ===
The election took place on 3 May 1990.

1990 Barnet London Borough Council election: Burnt Oak
Party	Candidate	Votes	%	±%
Labour	Alan Williams	2,548		
Labour	Malcolm Sargeant	2,300		
Labour	Gerald Shamash	2,183		
Conservative	Oliver Stone	1,172		
Conservative	Patricia Gammond	1,153		
Conservative	Robert Musik	1,101		
Green	Dorothy Lewis	428		
Liberal Democrats	Albert Earley	313		
Turnout				
Labour hold		Swing		
Labour hold		Swing		
Labour hold		Swing		

=== 1986 election ===
The election took place on 8 May 1986.

1986 Barnet London Borough Council election: Burnt Oak
Party	Candidate	Votes	%	±%
Labour	Peter Ellis	2,043		
Labour	Alan Williams	1,963		
Labour	Gerald Shamash	1,849		
Ind Lab	Jim Brophy	1,082		
Conservative	Peter Edwards	774		
Conservative	Oliver Stone	705		
Conservative	Julian Czarny	649		
Ind Lab	John Heritage	516		
Ind Lab	Richards Hankins	476		
Alliance	Albert Dean	356		
Alliance	Hilda Munden	354		
Alliance	Ian Albert	347		
Turnout				
Labour hold		Swing		
Labour hold		Swing		
Labour hold		Swing		

=== 1982 election ===
The election took place on 6 May 1982.

1982 Barnet London Borough Council election: Burnt Oak
Party	Candidate	Votes	%	±%
Labour	Jim Brophy	2,203		
Labour	Henry Timothy	1,803		
Labour	Peter Fordham	1,775		
Conservative	Peter Edwards	911		
Conservative	Keith Bass	833		
Conservative	Patricia Sparrow	787		
Alliance	George Allen	673		
Alliance	Alan Simpson	614		
Alliance	Miriam Levy	533		
Turnout			%	
Labour hold		Swing		
Labour hold		Swing		
Labour hold		Swing		

=== 1978 election ===
The election took place on 4 May 1978.

1978 Barnet London Borough Council election: Burnt Oak
Party	Candidate	Votes	%	±%
Labour	Jim Brophy	2,192		
Labour	Bertram McCormack	2,063		
Labour	Harold Davies	2,060		
Conservative	Keith Bass	998		
Conservative	John Hart	972		
Conservative	Peter Wharton	873		
National Front	Edward Bradley	315		
National Front	Alfred Chamberlain	295		
National Front	Edward Warner	243		
Liberal	Hilda Munden	162		
Liberal	Gisela Page	130		
Liberal	Roger Pattison	128		
Turnout			38.3%	
Labour win (new boundaries)				
Labour win (new boundaries)				
Labour win (new boundaries)				

== 1968–1978 Barnet council elections ==
There was a revision of ward boundaries in Barnet in 1968.

=== 1977 by-election ===
The by-election took place on 14 April 1977.

1977 Burnt Oak by-election
Party	Candidate	Votes	%	±%
Labour	Frederick Collisson	1,633		
Conservative	Brian Gordon	816		
National Front	Bernard Franklin	517		
Liberal	Hugh Ogus	130		
Turnout			32.8	
Labour hold		Swing		

=== 1974 election ===
The election took place on 2 May 1974.

1974 Barnet London Borough Council election: Burnt Oak
Party	Candidate	Votes	%	±%
Labour	J. Champion	2,489		
Labour	C. Lathrope	2,172		
Labour	R. Robinson	2,115		
Conservative	C. Turbutt	520		
Conservative	B. Mawhinney	481		
Conservative	R. Schleimer	475		
Liberal	J. Hearn	300		
Liberal	H. Munden	187		
Liberal	S. Palmer	161		
Turnout			35.8	
Labour hold		Swing		
Labour hold		Swing		
Labour hold		Swing		

=== 1971 election ===
The election took place on 13 May 1971.

1971 Barnet London Borough Council election: Burnt Oak
Party	Candidate	Votes	%	±%
Labour	J. Champion	3,468		
Labour	R. Robinson	3,327		
Labour	C. Lathrope	3,297		
Conservative	C. Turbutt	471		
Conservative	F. Bignell	459		
Conservative	A. Allan	444		
Turnout			39.9	
Labour hold		Swing		
Labour hold		Swing		
Labour hold		Swing		

=== 1968 election ===
The election took place on 9 May 1968.

1968 Barnet London Borough Council election: Burnt Oak
Party	Candidate	Votes	%	±%
Labour	J. Champion	1,671	60.8	
Labour	Frederick Collisson	1,561		
Labour	R. Robinson	1,488		
Conservative	R. Harris	876	32.8	
Conservative	L. Pym	865		
Conservative	C. Turbutt	804		
Liberal	D. Baron	217	6.4	
Liberal	A. Post	143		
Liberal	R. Simmons	140		
Turnout			28.2	
Labour win (new boundaries)				
Labour win (new boundaries)				
Labour win (new boundaries)				

== 1964–1968 Barnet council elections ==
External images
- Burnt Oak ward boundaries from 1965 to 1968 (west)
- Burnt Oak ward boundaries from 1965 to 1968 (east)

=== 1964 election ===
The election took place on 7 May 1964.

1964 Barnet London Borough Council election: Burnt Oak
Party	Candidate	Votes	%	±%
Labour	J. Champion	3,094		
Labour	A. Paul	3,039		
Labour	R. Robinson	2,999		
Conservative	G. Leach	387		
Conservative	G. Holland	378		
Conservative	S. Risdon	374		
Liberal	J. Allen	143		
Liberal	D. Martindale	135		
Communist	A. Legg	116		
Turnout		3,666	34.7	
Labour win (new seat)				
Labour win (new seat)				
Labour win (new seat)				
