= Gerald Shamash, Baron Shamash =

British lawyer and politician (born 1947)

The Right Honourable The Lord Shamash
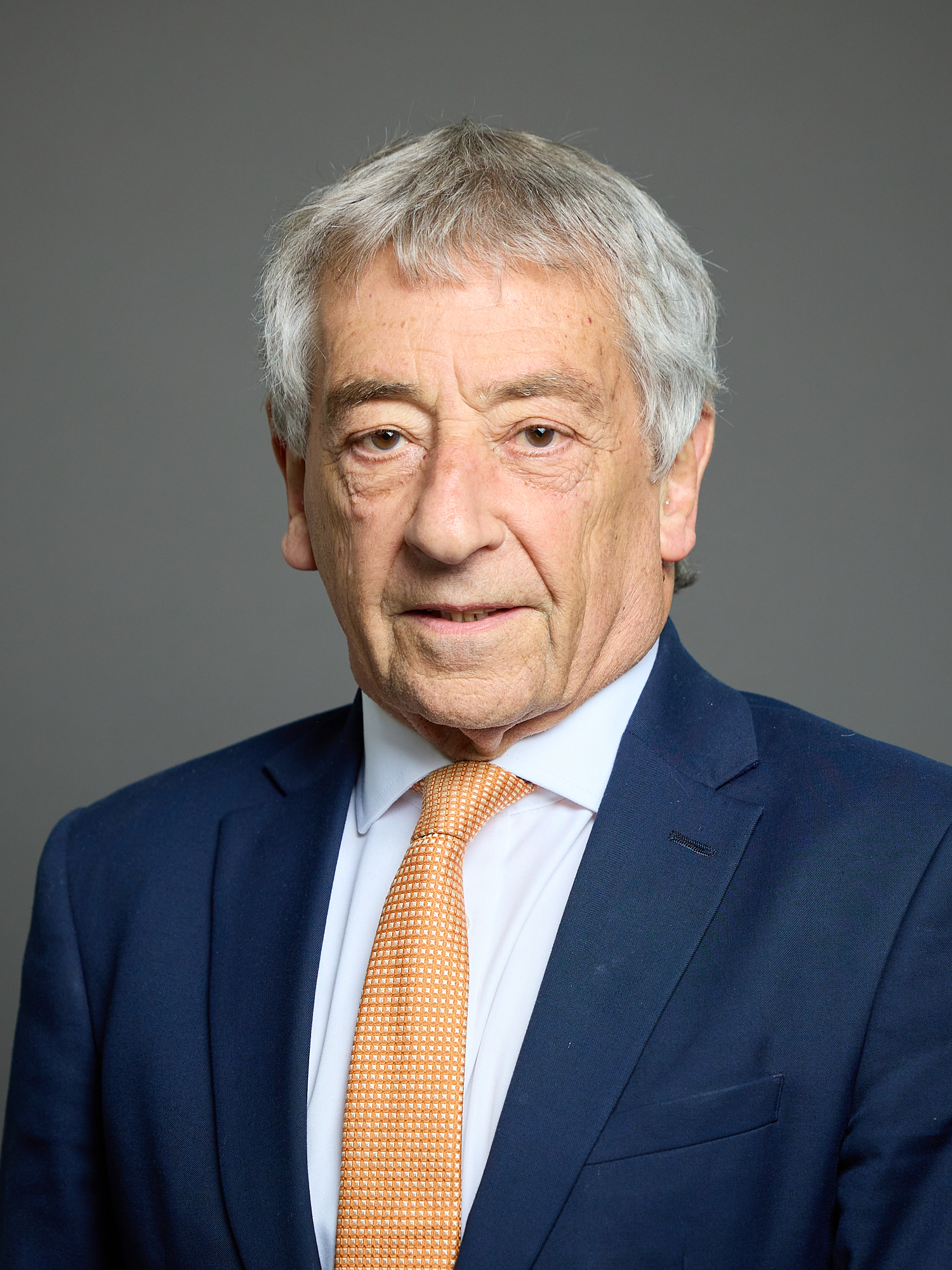
- Official portrait, 2025

Member of the House of Lords
- Lord Temporal
- Life peerage 6 March 2024

Member of Barnet London Borough Council for Burnt Oak
- In office 8 May 1986 – 4 May 1994

Personal details
- Born: Gerald David Shamash; 23 May 1947 (age 79) Manchester, England
- Party: Labour
- Spouse: Naomi Angell (m. 1975)
- Children: 3
- Education: University of Surrey
- Occupation: Solicitor

Gerald David Shamash, Baron Shamash (born 23 May 1947), is a British lawyer and life peer. He has acted as a solicitor for the Labour Party since 1990 and was appointed a member of the House of Lords in 2024.

== Early life and education ==
Shamash was born on 23 May 1947 in Manchester to Joseph and Victoria Shamash, Iraqi-Jewish parents who came to England from Baghdad. The family moved to London when Shamash's brother-in-law (and first cousin) Robert Sheldon was elected to Parliament in 1964. Shamash joined the Labour Party in 1969 after involvement in student politics and the Anti-Apartheid Movement.

Shamash attended North Cestrian Grammar School and Burnage Grammar School in Greater Manchester, and studied human and physical sciences at the University of Surrey to become a dentist before training to become a solicitor.

== Career ==
At the suggestion of his wife and her father, Shamash took up the study of law and qualified as a solicitor in 1976. His early legal career, at PR Kimber, was in criminal and personal-injury law. With Elaine Steel, he founded Steel & Shamash in 1981, based in Waterloo. One of the first firms to be granted a Legal Aid Agency contract, it merged with Edwards Duthie in 2019 to form Edwards Duthie Shamash, and Shamash heads its parliamentary, electoral and media law practice.

Shamash has acted as a solicitor for the Labour Party since 1990, having worked for the party since at least 1983. He advised Labour during the Cash-for-Honours and parliamentary expenses scandals, and acted for public figures affected by the phone-hacking scandal.

In the 1979 general election, Shamash stood unsuccessfully as a Labour Party candidate in the safe Conservative seat of Shoreham. He was subsequently elected a member of Barnet London Borough Council at the 1986 and 1990 council elections, representing the ward of Burnt Oak for two terms. Shamash has served as a magistrate in London since 1985.

Shamash was nominated by Labour leader Sir Keir Starmer for a life peerage and was created Baron Shamash, of West Didsbury in the City of Manchester, on 6 March 2024.

On 31 July 2025, he was a leading signatory of a letter from 38 House of Lords members opposing the UK's plan to recognise a State of Palestine: the peers said Palestine “does not meet the international law criteria for recognition of a state, namely, defined territory, a permanent population, an effective government and the capacity to enter into relations with other states”.

== Personal life ==
In 1975, Shamash married Naomi Angell, a specialist in international adoption law; they have two sons and a daughter who were adopted from South America. He is a supporter of Manchester United Football Club and chaired the Manchester United Supporters' Trust from 2012 to 2021.

Shamash is Jewish but not religious.

Orders of precedence in the United Kingdom
Preceded by The Lord Banner	Gentlemen; Baron Shamash	Followed by The Lord Petitgas
