= 2022 Barnet London Borough Council election =

2022 local election in Barnet

- 5 May 2022

All 63 seats on Barnet London Borough Council 32 seats needed for a majority
- Registered: 256,974
- Turnout: 97,480; 37.9%
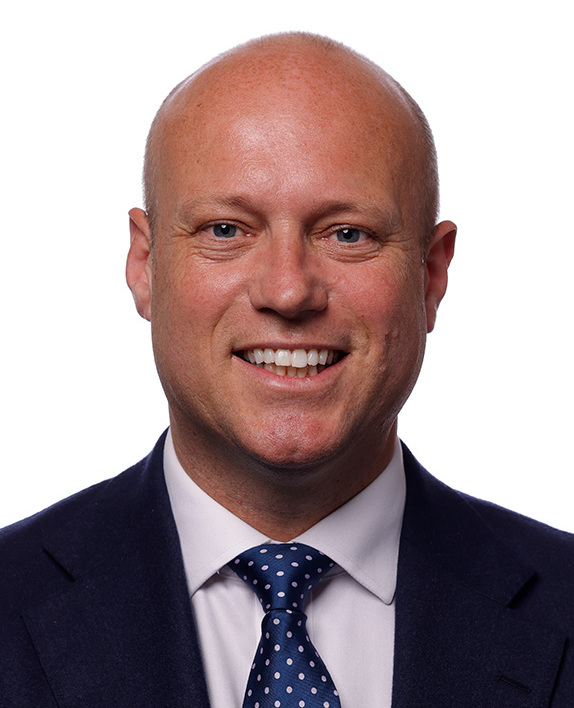
	First party	Second party
	Lab
Leader	Barry Rawlings	Dan Thomas
Party	Labour	Conservative
Leader's seat	Friern Barnet	Finchley Church End
Last election	25 seats, 39.0%	38 seats, 44.5%
Seats won	41	22
Seat change	▲16	▼16
Popular vote	46,070	37,608
Percentage	43.0%	35.1%
Swing	▲4.0%	▼9.4%
- Map of the results of the 2022 Barnet London Borough council election. Labour in red and Conservatives in blue.
Council control before election
Conservative
Subsequent council control
Labour

The 2022 Barnet London Borough Council election took place on 5 May 2022, alongside local elections in the other London boroughs and elections to local authorities across the United Kingdom. All 63 members of Barnet London Borough Council were elected. The Labour Party took overall control, winning 41 of the seats to the Conservative Party's 22. This was the first time Labour had won the council outright; previously, the Conservatives had always won the most seats, usually with an overall majority.

At the previous election in 2018, the Conservative Party maintained its longstanding control of the council, winning 38 out of the 63 seats, with the Labour Party forming the council opposition with the remaining 25 seats. The 2022 election took place under new boundaries, but with the number of councillors remaining at 63.

== Background ==
=== History ===
Result of the 2018 borough election

The thirty-two London boroughs were established in 1965 by the London Government Act 1963. They are the principal authorities in Greater London and have responsibilities including education, housing, planning, highways, social services, libraries, recreation, waste, environmental health and revenue collection. Some of the powers are shared with the Greater London Authority, which also manages passenger transport, police, and fire.

Barnet has generally been controlled by the Conservative Party since its establishment, with a period of no overall control between 1994 and 2002. The Labour Party has held seats in the borough consistently, and the Liberal Democrats have won seats in ten of the fifteen previous council elections. In the most recent prior election in 2018, the Conservatives won 38 seats and Labour won 25, with the Conservatives receiving 45.5% and Labour receiving 39.0% of the overall vote. Although neither won any seats, the Liberal Democrats won 9.2% of the vote and the Green Party won 6.2% of the vote across the borough. The council had been considered a target for Labour, but the party lost seats, with the defeated Labour councillor Adam Langleben citing antisemitism in the Labour Party. His assessment was shared by Barry Rawlings, the leader of the Labour group on the council. The incumbent leader of the council was Dan Thomas, a Conservative, who had held the role since 2019.

=== Council term ===
The Labour councillor for Underhill Jessica Brayne left the Labour Party in February 2019 over antisemitism in the Labour Party, the party's approach to Brexit and the leadership of Jeremy Corbyn. She later joined the Liberal Democrats. The Conservative councillor for Garden Suburb, Gabriel Rozenberg, defected to the Liberal Democrats in September 2019 due to the party's support of Brexit and the election of Boris Johnson as the party's leader. In September 2020, the Conservative councillor for Edgware, Brian Gordon, died. Due to the COVID-19 pandemic, a by-election could not be held until May 2021. The seat was won the Conservative candidate, Nick Nearing-Smith. In April 2021, the Labour councillor Jo Cooper resigned her East Barnet seat to focus on her work for the NHS. Another by-election was held in May 2021 alongside that year's London mayoral election and London Assembly election. The Conservative candidate, Nicole Richer, a project manager and school governor, won the seat, increasing the Conservative majority on the council. Later in May 2021, the Conservative councillor for Childs Hill, Shimon Ryde, changed his affiliation to independent "to deal with a personal matter". In July 2021, three Jewish Conservative councillors failed to be reselected by their party as candidates for the 2022 election.

Along with most other London boroughs, Barnet was subject to a boundary review ahead of the 2022 election. The Local Government Boundary Commission for England concluded that the council should maintain sixty-three seats, but produced new election boundaries following a period of consultation.

== Campaign ==
Barnet had been the top target council for Labour to win in London in 2014 and 2018; in neither time was the party successful. It was again mooted as a potential gain for the party in 2022, with the Conservative peer Robert Hayward saying that his party risked losing control of it in the wake of the partygate scandal. Jewish News reported that Labour hoped to do well in the election, possibly winning control of the council, saying that the election "will give the community the chance to offer a clear sign of how impressed they are with Starmer’s efforts to kick the antisemites out". The Evening Standard reported that 15% of residents in the borough were estimated to be Jewish. Nick Bowes, the chief executive of the Centre for London, wrote that the result "will reveal how successfully Keir Starmer has shaken off Jeremy Corbyn’s toxic legacy on antisemitism". Labour launched their London local election campaign in High Barnet.

Transport for London's plans to build housing on some station car parks were considered a potential issue in the election. The Conservative councillor Helene Richman defected to the Liberal Democrats in April 2022. She said "the Conservatives are letting inequality rise and living standards drop. They have given up on communities like ours". The Conservative council leader Dan Thomas said there had been complaints about her conduct.

Labour and the Conservatives were standing a full slate of 63 candidates, the Liberal Democrats were standing 46 candidates in 18 wards, the Greens were standing one candidate in each of the 24 wards, four independents were standing in three wards, the Women's Equality Party were standing four candidates in four wards and Rejoin EU were standing three candidates in three wards.

== Electoral process ==
Barnet, as with other London borough councils, elects all of its councillors at once every four years, with the previous election having taken place in 2018. The election took place by multi-member Plurality block voting, with each ward being represented by two or three councillors. Electors had as many votes as there are councillors to be elected in their ward, with the top two or three being elected. There are fifteen wards with three councillors and nine with two councillors.

All registered electors (British, Irish, Commonwealth and European Union citizens) living in London aged 18 or over were entitled to vote in the election. People who lived at two addresses in different councils, such as university students with different term-time and holiday addresses, were entitled to be registered for and vote in elections in both local authorities. Voting in-person at polling stations took place from 7:00 to 22:00 on election day, and voters were able to apply for postal votes or proxy votes in advance of the election.

== Previous council composition ==
Council composition following the 2018 election

Council composition ahead of the 2022 election

Council composition following the 2022 election

After 2018 election		Before 2022 election		After 2022 election	
Party	Seats	Party	Seats	Party	Seats
Conservative	38	Conservative	36	Conservative	22
Labour	25	Labour	23	Labour	41
		Liberal Democrats	3	Liberal Democrats	0
		Independent	1	Independent	0

== Election results ==
Barnet local election result 2022
Party	Seats	Gains	Losses	Net gain/loss	Seats %	Votes %	Votes	+/−
Labour	41	10	0	▲16	65.1	46.7	118,195	+7.7
Conservative	22	0	10	▼16	34.9	38.3	96,908	−6.2
Liberal Democrats	0	0	0	Steady	0.0	9.7	24,563	+0.5
Green	0	0	0	Steady	0.0	4.2	10,570	–2.1
Independent	0	0	0	Steady	0.0	0.5	1,213	+0.1
Women's Equality	0	0	0	Steady	0.0	0.5	1,159	N/A
Rejoin EU	0	0	0	Steady	0.0	0.2	465	N/A

== Ward results ==
Ward results are as provided by Barnet Council. Provisional turnout for the whole borough was 97,480, 37.9%. Incumbent councillors are marked with an asterisk (*).

=== Barnet Vale ===
Barnet Vale (3 seats)
Party	Candidate	Votes	%	±%
Labour	Marianne Haylett	2,192	43.2	
Conservative	David Longstaff*	2,080	41.0	
Labour	Richard Barnes	2,054	40.5	
Conservative	Julian Teare*	2,016	39.7	
Conservative	William Kumar	1,972	38.9	
Labour	Robert Persad	1,834	36.1	
Liberal Democrats	Simon Cohen	747	14.7	
Green	Charles Wicksteed	732	14.4	
Liberal Democrats	Stephen Barber	693	13.7	
Liberal Democrats	Benjamin Papworth	416	8.2	
Turnout		5,075	42.4	
Labour win (new seat)				
Conservative win (new seat)				
Labour win (new seat)				

=== Brunswick Park ===
Brunswick Park (3 seats)
Party	Candidate	Votes	%	±%
Labour	Giulia Monasterio	2,381	49.7	
Labour	Paul Lemon	2,353	49.1	
Labour	Tony Vourou	2,193	45.8	
Conservative	Lisa Rutter*	1,918	40.0	
Conservative	Nicole Richer*	1,829	38.2	
Conservative	Josh Mastin-Lee	1,805	37.7	
Green	David Farbey	524	10.9	
Liberal Democrats	Luigi Bille	321	6.7	
Liberal Democrats	Glyn Williams	262	5.5	
Liberal Democrats	Jonty Stern	247	5.2	
Turnout		4,791	41.4	
Labour win (new boundaries)				
Labour win (new boundaries)				
Labour win (new boundaries)				

=== Burnt Oak ===
Burnt Oak (3 seats)
Party	Candidate	Votes	%	±%
Labour	Sara Conway*	2,545	69.1	
Labour	Kamal Gurung	2,377	64.5	
Labour	Ammar Naqvi*	2,105	57.1	
Conservative	Ruth Hart	962	26.1	
Conservative	Timothy McGeever	861	23.4	
Conservative	Samuel Shupac	736	20.0	
Green	Rashina Shah	520	14.1	
Turnout		3,684	27.4	
Labour win (new boundaries)				
Labour win (new boundaries)				
Labour win (new boundaries)				

=== Childs Hill ===
Childs Hill (3 seats)
Party	Candidate	Votes	%	±%
Labour	Giulia Innocenti	2,061	45.7	
Labour	Matthew Perlberg	1,936	42.9	
Labour	Nigel Young	1,844	40.9	
Conservative	Peter Zinkin*	1,746	38.7	
Conservative	Nizza Fluss*	1,740	38.6	
Conservative	Adam Gheasuddin	1,497	33.2	
Liberal Democrats	Sam Cohen	627	13.9	
Liberal Democrats	Emma Rozenberg	597	13.2	
Liberal Democrats	Toby Davis	502	11.1	
Green	Karen Dolby	451	10.0	
Turnout		4,510	35.9	
Labour win (new boundaries)				
Labour win (new boundaries)				
Labour win (new boundaries)				

=== Colindale North ===
Colindale North (2 seats)
Party	Candidate	Votes	%	±%
Labour	Andreas Ioannidis	1,156	63.3	
Labour	Zakia Zubairi*	1,102	60.3	
Conservative	Ben Margulies	360	19.7	
Conservative	Joseph Prager	333	18.2	
Independent	Marcin Nocek	243	13.3	
Green	Maggie Curati	172	9.4	
Independent	Sabriye Warsame	91	5.0	
Turnout		1,827	25.1	
Labour win (new seat)				
Labour win (new seat)				

=== Colindale South ===
Colindale South (3 seats)
Party	Candidate	Votes	%	±%
Labour	Gill Sargeant*	2,008	64.1	
Labour	Nagus Narenthira*	1,936	61.8	
Labour	Humayune Khalick	1,888	60.3	
Conservative	Adam Collins	945	30.2	
Conservative	Shivaji Ghosh	807	25.8	
Conservative	Nigel Saidler	775	24.8	
Green	Rajul Shah	437	14.0	
Turnout		3,131	27.7	
Labour win (new seat)				
Labour win (new seat)				
Labour win (new seat)				

=== Cricklewood ===
Cricklewood (2 seats)
Party	Candidate	Votes	%	±%
Labour Co-op	Anne Clarke*	1,314	69.7	
Labour Co-op	Alan Schneiderman*	1,109	58.8	
Conservative	Yosef David	415	22.0	
Conservative	Ajantha Tennakoon	356	18.9	
Green	Danielle Pollastri	192	10.2	
Liberal Democrats	Sophie Leighton	131	6.9	
Liberal Democrats	Charles Lawton	106	5.6	
Turnout		1,885	30.6	
Labour win (new seat)				
Labour win (new seat)				

=== East Barnet ===
East Barnet (3 seats)
Party	Candidate	Votes	%	±%
Labour	Philip Cohen	2,547	48.4	
Labour	Edith David	2,514	47.8	
Labour	Simon Radford	2,342	44.5	
Conservative	Felix Byers*	2,229	42.4	
Conservative	Pavan Pavanakumar	2,055	39.1	
Conservative	Paul Roberts	2,023	38.5	
Green	Judith Echlin	628	11.9	
Liberal Democrats	Sean Hooker	374	7.1	
Liberal Democrats	David Nowell	280	5.3	
Liberal Democrats	David Keech	243	4.6	
Turnout		5,261	42.6	
Labour win (new boundaries)				
Labour win (new boundaries)				
Labour win (new boundaries)				

=== East Finchley ===
East Finchley (3 seats)
Party	Candidate	Votes	%	±%
Labour Co-op	Arjun Mittra*	3,122	64.9	
Labour Co-op	Alison Moore*	3,001	62.4	
Labour Co-op	Claire Farrier*	2,895	60.1	
Liberal Democrats	Julia Hines	924	19.2	
Liberal Democrats	David Noble	783	16.3	
Liberal Democrats	Sachin Patel	729	15.1	
Conservative	Robert Buckwell	671	13.9	
Conservative	Lesley Mcilmoyle	643	13.4	
Conservative	Megan Tucker	627	13.0	
Green	Steve Parsons	592	12.3	
Turnout		4,813	43.7	
Labour win (new boundaries)				
Labour win (new boundaries)				
Labour win (new boundaries)				

=== Edgware ===
Edgware (3 seats)
Party	Candidate	Votes	%	±%
Conservative	Lucy Wakeley	3,110	61.3	
Conservative	Nick Mearing-Smith*	3,007	59.3	
Conservative	Shuey Gordon	2,746	54.2	
Labour	Nikhilesh Chakraborty	1,671	33.0	
Labour	Ryan Jackson	1,478	29.2	
Labour	Sorah Gluck	1,372	27.1	
Green	Dudley Miles	510	10.1	
Women's Equality	Lisa Bard	453	8.9	
Turnout		5,070	37.7	
Conservative win (new boundaries)				
Conservative win (new boundaries)				
Conservative win (new boundaries)				

=== Edgwarebury ===
Edgwarebury (2 seats)
Party	Candidate	Votes	%	±%
Conservative	Sarah Wardle*	1,749	48.4	
Conservative	Lachhya Gurung*	1,691	46.8	
Labour	Josh Tapper	1,649	45.7	
Labour	Nila Patel	1,582	43.8	
Green	Samuel Murray	284	7.9	
Turnout		3,610	43.6	
Conservative win (new seat)				
Conservative win (new seat)				

=== Finchley Church End ===
Finchley Church End (3 seats)
Party	Candidate	Votes	%	±%
Conservative	Eva Greenspan*	2,357	44.8	
Conservative	Jennifer Grocock*	2,155	40.9	
Conservative	Dan Thomas*	2,140	40.6	
Liberal Democrats	Sarah Hoyle	1,465	27.8	
Labour	Suzanne Baker	1,464	27.8	
Liberal Democrats	Dominic Aubrey-Jones	1,387	26.3	
Labour	Hilary Burrage	1,339	25.4	
Liberal Democrats	Daniel Fenesan	1,291	24.5	
Labour	Mary McGuirk	1,226	23.3	
Green	Nina Jacoby-Owen	464	8.8	
Turnout		5,266	40.5	
Conservative win (new boundaries)				
Conservative win (new boundaries)				
Conservative win (new boundaries)				

=== Friern Barnet ===
Friern Barnet (3 seats)
Party	Candidate	Votes	%	±%
Labour	Pauline Webb*	3,030	65.3	
Labour	Linda Lusingu	2,880	62.1	
Labour	Barry Rawlings*	2,779	59.9	
Conservative	Kate Salinger	1,137	24.5	
Conservative	Kevin Ghateh	1,026	22.1	
Conservative	Anila Skeja	991	21.4	
Green	Ed Tytherleigh	550	11.9	
Liberal Democrats	Graham Craig	367	7.9	
Liberal Democrats	Lavinia Jessup	350	7.5	
Liberal Democrats	Zoe Myerson	350	7.5	
Turnout		4,640	36.6	
Labour win (new seat)				
Labour win (new seat)				
Labour win (new seat)				

=== Garden Suburb ===
Garden Suburb (2 seats)
Party	Candidate	Votes	%	±%
Conservative	Rohit Grover*	1,895	49.2	
Conservative	Michael Mire	1,878	48.8	
Labour	Kathy Levine*	1,052	27.3	
Labour	Adam Kayani	878	22.8	
Liberal Democrats	Daniel Mermelstein	622	16.2	
Liberal Democrats	Altan Aybiyik	496	12.9	
Green	Nicolas Ceasar	369	9.6	
Independent	Brian Ingram	311	8.1	
Turnout		3,848	42.7	
Conservative win (new boundaries)				
Conservative win (new boundaries)				

=== Golders Green ===
Golders Green (2 seats)
Party	Candidate	Votes	%	±%
Conservative	Dean Cohen*	2,171	68.4	
Conservative	Melvin Cohen*	2,146	67.6	
Labour	Karen Walkden	650	20.5	
Labour	Susan Waller	613	19.3	
Green	Adele Ward	205	6.5	
Liberal Democrats	Penny Gostyn	190	6.0	
Liberal Democrats	Simon Shaer	156	4.9	
Women's Equality	Debbie Brazil	113	3.6	
Turnout		3,175	36.8	
Conservative win (new boundaries)				
Conservative win (new boundaries)				

=== Hendon ===
Hendon (3 seats)
Party	Candidate	Votes	%	±%
Conservative	Joshua Conway	2,632	57.0	
Conservative	Alex Prager*	2,545	55.1	
Conservative	Mark Shooter*	2,436	52.7	
Labour	Charlotte Daus	1,427	30.9	
Labour	David Dunitz	1,329	28.8	
Labour	Viljo Wilding	1,018	22.0	
Independent	Franca Oliffe	568	12.3	
Green	Christopher Fordyce	429	9.3	
Liberal Democrats	Michael Hughes	277	6.0	
Liberal Democrats	Janice Turner	276	6.0	
Liberal Democrats	Eunice Phillips	240	5.2	
Turnout		4,620	34.3	
Conservative win (new boundaries)				
Conservative win (new boundaries)				
Conservative win (new boundaries)				

=== High Barnet ===
High Barnet (2 seats)
Party	Candidate	Votes	%	±%
Labour	Emma Whysall	2,051	50.6	
Labour	Paul Edwards*	2,044	50.4	
Conservative	Lara Ayodeji-Akindiji	1,504	37.1	
Conservative	Dan King	1,459	36.0	
Green	Joan Waterson	359	8.9	
Liberal Democrats	Peter Lusher	212	5.2	
Liberal Democrats	Michael West	182	4.5	
Rejoin EU	Richard Hewison	116	2.9	
Turnout		4,054	46.3	
Labour win (new boundaries)				
Labour win (new boundaries)				

=== Mill Hill ===
Mill Hill (3 seats)
Party	Candidate	Votes	%	±%
Conservative	Val Duschinsky*	2,010	45.1	
Conservative	Elliot Simberg*	1,909	42.9	
Conservative	Laithe Jajeh*	1,783	40.0	
Labour	Rachel Barker	1,565	35.1	
Labour	Frankie Grant	1,413	31.7	
Labour	Pascale Fanning-Tichborne	1,390	31.2	
Liberal Democrats	Roger Tichborne	735	16.5	
Liberal Democrats	Richard Logue	713	16.0	
Liberal Democrats	Donna Pickup	672	15.1	
Green	Elizabeth Wardle	441	9.9	
Women's Equality	Kay Lauer	262	5.9	
Turnout		4,453	35.7	
Conservative win (new boundaries)				
Conservative win (new boundaries)				
Conservative win (new boundaries)				

=== Totteridge and Woodside ===
Totteridge and Woodside (3 seats)
Party	Candidate	Votes	%	±%
Conservative	Alison Cornelius*	2,041	49.2	
Conservative	Caroline Stock*	1,986	47.8	
Conservative	Richard Cornelius*	1,975	47.6	
Labour	Vanessa David	1,435	34.6	
Labour	Parmodh Sharma	1,310	31.6	
Labour	Laurie Williams*	1,283	30.9	
Liberal Democrats	Jack Cohen	555	13.4	
Green	Fabio Vollono	455	11.0	
Liberal Democrats	Tanya Spensley	443	10.7	
Liberal Democrats	Oliver Rodwell	403	9.7	
Rejoin EU	Brendan Donnelly	213	5.1	
Turnout		4,151	40.0	
Conservative win (new seat)				
Conservative win (new seat)				
Conservative win (new seat)				

=== Underhill ===
Underhill (2 seats)
Party	Candidate	Votes	%	±%
Labour	Zahra Beg	2,082	55.6	
Labour	Tim Roberts*	1,991	53.2	
Conservative	Reuben Thompstone*	1,173	31.3	
Conservative	Taiye Garrick	1,165	31.1	
Green	Andrew Dolby	332	8.9	
Liberal Democrats	Victor Corney	224	6.0	
Liberal Democrats	Patrick Daly	209	5.6	
Rejoin EU	Ben Rend	136	3.6	
Turnout		3,746	43.4	
Labour win (new boundaries)				
Labour win (new boundaries)				

=== West Finchley ===
West Finchley (3 seats)
Party	Candidate	Votes	%	±%
Labour	Kath McGuirk*	2,952	52.7	
Labour	Ross Houston*	2,916	52.1	
Labour	Danny Rich*	2,724	48.6	
Liberal Democrats	Gabriel Rozenberg*	1,289	23.0	
Liberal Democrats	Clareine Enderby	1,203	21.5	
Conservative	Linda Savin	1,160	20.7	
Conservative	Robert Fucilla	1,106	19.8	
Conservative	Thomas Sheppard	1,081	19.3	
Liberal Democrats	Gregory Ruback	992	17.7	
Green	John Colmans	637	11.4	
Women's Equality	Ruth Vincenti	331	5.9	
Turnout		5,600	44.7	
Labour win (new boundaries)				
Labour win (new boundaries)				
Labour win (new boundaries)				

=== West Hendon ===
West Hendon (3 seats)
Party	Candidate	Votes	%	±%
Labour	Andrea Bilbow	1,901	56.1	
Labour	Ernest Ambe	1,791	52.9	
Labour	Rishikesh Chakraborty	1,761	52.0	
Conservative	Pauline Lewis	1,027	30.3	
Conservative	Jeremy Ross	931	27.5	
Conservative	Harvey Odze	870	25.7	
Liberal Democrats	Helene Richman*	650	19.2	
Green	Tye Hunter	436	12.9	
Turnout		3,388	31.5	
Labour win (new boundaries)				
Labour win (new boundaries)				
Labour win (new boundaries)				

=== Whetstone ===
Whetstone (2 seats)
Party	Candidate	Votes	%	±%
Labour	Ella Rose	1,898	55.3	
Labour	Liron Velleman	1,625	47.4	
Conservative	Thomas Smith*	1,336	39.0	
Conservative	Sachin Rajput*	1,308	38.1	
Green	Andrew Newby	456	13.3	
Turnout		3,430	43.3	
Labour win (new seat)				
Labour win (new seat)				

=== Woodhouse ===
Woodhouse (2 seats)
Party	Candidate	Votes	%	±%
Labour	Geof Cooke*	1,917	55.5	
Labour	Anne Hutton*	1,900	55.0	
Conservative	Golnar Bokaei*	980	28.4	
Conservative	Shaan Owusu-Afriyie	891	25.8	
Green	David Burns	395	11.4	
Liberal Democrats	Gerard Fitzgerald	318	9.2	
Liberal Democrats	James Goldman	314	9.1	
Turnout		3,452	36.5	
Labour win (new boundaries)				
Labour win (new boundaries)				

== Changes 2022-2026 ==
=== Affiliation changes ===
Affiliation	Councillors			
Affiliation	Elected in 2022	Current	Difference	
Labour	41	40	▼1	
Conservative	22	20	▼2	
Reform	0	1 (Note: Councillor Mark Shooter was elected as a Conservative candidate and joined Reform UK in December 2024.)	▲1	
Green	0	1 (Note: Councillor Linda Lusingu was elected as a Labour candidate in 2022, left the Labour Party shortly after and joined the Green Party in February 2026.)	▲1	
Independent	0	1	▲1	
Total		63	63	Steady

=== By-elections ===
==== Golders Green ====
Golders Green by-election: 15 February 2023
Party	Candidate	Votes	%	±%
Conservative	Peter Zinkin	1,623	66.8	0.7
Labour Co-op	Sue Waller	547	22.5	+2.3
Rejoin EU	Brendan Donnelly	99	4.1	N/A
Green	Gabrielle Bailey	94	3.9	–2.5
Liberal Democrats	James Goldman	65	2.7	–3.2
Majority		1,076	44.3	N/A
Turnout		2,428		
Conservative hold		Swing	▼1.5	

==== Barnet Vale ====
Barnet Vale by-election: 4 July 2024
Party	Candidate	Votes	%	±%
Labour	Sue Baker	3,244	41.1	+3.0
Conservative	Sachin Rajput	2,858	36.3	+0.1
Liberal Democrats	Simon Cohen	916	11.6	–1.4
Green	Gina Theodorou	866	11.0	–1.7
Majority		386	4.8	N/A
Turnout		7,884		
Labour hold		Swing	▲1.5	

==== Burnt Oak ====
Burnt Oak by-election: 13 February 2025
Party	Candidate	Votes	%	±%
Labour	Charlotte Daus	1,064	45.0	–18.2
Conservative	Kevin Ghateh	501	21.2	–2.7
Reform	Sury Khatri	434	18.4	N/A
Green	Gabrielle Bailey	202	8.6	–4.3
Liberal Democrats	Altan Akbiyik	93	3.9	N/A
Rejoin EU	Charles Honderick	68	2.9	N/A
Majority		563	23.8	N/A
Turnout		2,362		
Labour hold		Swing	▼7.8	

==== Finchley Church End ====
Finchley Church End by-election: 6 March 2025
Party	Candidate	Votes	%	±%
Conservative	Josh Mastin-Lee	1,509	45.2	+0.4
Labour	Beverley Kotey	977	29.3	+1.5
Reform	Lisa Rutter	351	10.5	N/A
Liberal Democrats	James Goldman	213	6.4	−21.4
Green	David Farbey	147	4.4	−4.4
Rejoin EU	Brendan Donnelly	119	3.6	N/A
Independent	Brian Ingram	20	0.6	N/A
Majority		532	15.9	
Turnout		3,336	12.5	−28
Conservative hold		Swing		

==== Whetstone ====
Whetstone by-election: 15th May 2025
Party	Candidate	Votes	%	±%
Labour	Ezra Cohen	965	33.5	−18.0
Conservative	Tom Smith	818	28.4	−7.8
Reform	Adrian Kitching	592	20.5	N/A
Green	Charli Thompson	208	7.2	−5.4
Liberal Democrats	Luigi Bille	176	6.1	N/A
Rejoin EU	Richard Hewison	65	2.3	N/A
Independent (TUSC)	Martin Hudson	47	1.6	N/A
Independent	Brian Ingram	13	0.5	N/A
Majority		147	5.1	
Turnout		2,884	34.3	
Labour hold		Swing		

==== Hendon ====
Hendon by-election: 30 October 2025
Party	Candidate	Votes	%	±%
Conservative	Shimon Ryde	1,656	46.8	–2.6
Reform	Yosef David	1,069	30.2	N/A
Labour	Lewis Harrison	423	12.0	–14.8
Green	Gabrielle Bailey	201	5.7	–2.3
Liberal Democrats	Jeremy Walsh	107	3.0	–2.2
Rejoin EU	Ben Rend	81	2.3	N/A
Majority		587	16.6	N/A
Turnout		3,537	25.2	–9.1
Registered electors		14,051		
Conservative hold				
