= Barnet Vale (ward) =

- Electoral ward for the Barnet London Borough Council
- Barnet Vale ward boundaries since 2022
- Borough: Barnet
- County: Greater London
- Population: 16,869 (2021) (Note: 2021 Census data reported for 2022 ward boundaries)
- Electorate: 11,968 (2022)
- Major settlements: Barnet Vale, Monken Hadley, New Barnet
- Area: 3.517 square kilometres (1.358 sq mi)

Current electoral ward
- Created: 2022
- Number of members: 3
- Councillors: David Longstaff; Richard Barnes; Sue Baker
- Created from: High Barnet, Oakleigh, Totteridge, Underhill
- GSS code: E05013628

Barnet Vale is an electoral ward in the London Borough of Barnet. The ward was first used in the 2022 elections. It returns three councillors to Barnet London Borough Council.

== List of councillors ==
Term	Councillor	Party
2022–2024	Marianne Haylett	Labour
2022–present	David Longstaff	Conservative
2022–present	Richard Barnes	Labour
2024–present	Sue Baker	Labour

== Barnet council elections ==
=== 2024 by-election ===
The by-election on 4 July 2024 took place on the same day as the United Kingdom general election. It followed the resignation of Marianne Haylett.

2024 Barnet Vale by-election
Party	Candidate	Votes	%	±%
Labour	Sue Baker	3,244	41.1	+3.0
Conservative	Sachin Rajput	2,858	36.3	+0.1
Liberal Democrats	Jeremy Cohen	916	11.6	−1.4
Green	Gina Theodorou	866	11.0	−1.7
Majority		386	4.9	
Turnout		7,884		
Labour hold		Swing		

=== 2022 election ===
The election took place on 5 May 2022.

2022 Barnet London Borough Council election: Barnet Vale (3)
Party	Candidate	Votes	%	±%
Labour	Marianne Haylett	2,192	43.2	
Conservative	David Longstaff	2,080	41.0	
Labour	Richard Barnes	2,054	40.5	
Conservative	Julian Teare	2,016	39.7	
Conservative	William Kumar	1,972	38.9	
Labour	Robert Persad	1,834	36.1	
Liberal Democrats	Simon Cohen	747	14.7	
Green	Charles Wicksteed	732	14.4	
Liberal Democrats	Stephen Barber	693	13.7	
Liberal Democrats	Benjamin Papworth	416	8.2	
Turnout		5,075	42.4	
Labour win (new seat)				
Conservative win (new seat)				
Labour win (new seat)				
