= High Barnet (ward) =

Electoral ward in Barnet, London, England

- Electoral ward for the Barnet London Borough Council
- Borough: Barnet
- County: Greater London
- Population: 11,930 (2021)
- Major settlements: High Barnet
- Area: 8.638 km²

Current electoral ward
- Created: 2002
- Councillors: 2

High Barnet is an electoral ward in the London Borough of Barnet. The ward was first used in the 2002 elections. It elects two councillors to Barnet London Borough Council.

== Geography ==
The ward is named after the suburb of High Barnet.

== Councillors ==
Election	Councillors	
2022	Emma Whysall (Labour)	Paul Edwards (Labour)

== Elections ==
=== 2022 Barnet London Borough Council election ===
High Barnet (2 seats)
Party	Candidate	Votes	%	±%
Labour	Emma Whysall	2,051	50.6	
Labour	Paul Edwards*	2,044	50.4	
Conservative	Lara Ayodeji-Akindiji	1,504	37.1	
Conservative	Dan King	1,459	36.0	
Green	Joan Waterson	359	8.9	
Liberal Democrats	Peter Lusher	212	5.2	
Liberal Democrats	Michael West	182	4.5	
Rejoin EU	Richard Hewison	116	2.9	
Turnout		4,054	46.3	
Labour win (new boundaries)				
Labour win (new boundaries)				
