= Underhill (ward) =

Electoral ward in Barnet, London, England

- Electoral ward for the Barnet London Borough Council
- Borough: Barnet
- County: Greater London
- Population: 12,372 (2021)
- Area: 2.111 km²

Current electoral ward
- Created: 2002
- Councillors: 2

Underhill is an electoral ward in the London Borough of Barnet. The ward was first used in the 2002 elections. It elects two councillors to Barnet London Borough Council.

== Geography ==
The ward is named after the former Underhill Stadium.

== Councillors ==
| Election | Councillors | |
|---|---|---|
| 2022 | Zahra Beg (Labour) | Tim Roberts (Labour) |

== Elections ==
=== 2022 Barnet London Borough Council election ===
Underhill (2 seats)
| Party | Candidate | Votes | % | ±% |
|---|---|---|---|---|
| Labour | Zahra Beg | 2,082 | 55.6 | |
| Labour | Tim Roberts* | 1,991 | 53.2 | |
| Conservative | Reuben Thompstone* | 1,173 | 31.3 | |
| Conservative | Taiye Garrick | 1,165 | 31.1 | |
| Green | Andrew Dolby | 332 | 8.9 | |
| Liberal Democrats | Victor Corney | 224 | 6.0 | |
| Liberal Democrats | Patrick Daly | 209 | 5.6 | |
| Rejoin EU | Ben Rend | 136 | 3.6 | |
| Turnout | | 3,746 | 43.4 | |
| Labour win (new boundaries) | | | | |
| Labour win (new boundaries) | | | | |
