= Whetstone (ward) =

- Electoral ward for the Barnet London Borough Council
- Whetstone ward boundaries since 2022
- Borough: Barnet
- County: Greater London
- Population: 10,771 (2021) (Note: 2021 Census data reported for 2022 ward boundaries)
- Electorate: 7,923 (2022)
- Major settlements: Whetstone
- Area: 2.537 square kilometres (0.980 sq mi)

Current electoral ward
- Created: 2022
- Number of members: 2
- Councillors: Ella Rose; Ezra Cohen
- Created from: Brunswick Park, Oakleigh, Totteridge
- GSS code: E05013650

Whetstone is an electoral ward in the London Borough of Barnet. The ward was first used in the 2022 elections. It returns two councillors to Barnet London Borough Council. Labour's Elly Rose has represented Whetstone since the ward's creation. The second seat has been held by Ezra Cohen since 2025, following the resignation of Liron Velleman.

== List of councillors ==
Term	Councillor	Party
2022–present	Ella Rose	Labour
2022–2025	Liron Velleman	Labour
2025–present	Ezra Cohen	Labour

== Barnet council elections ==
=== 2025 by-election ===
The by-election took place on 15 May 2025, following the resignation of Liron Velleman. Velleman was later convicted of child sex offences, which were committed while he was councillor.

2025 Whetstone by-election
Party	Candidate	Votes	%	±%
Labour	Ezra Cohen	965	33.5	−17.9
Conservative	Thomas Smith	818	28.4	−7.8
Reform	Adrian Kitching	592	20.5	+20.5
Green	Charli Thompson	208	7.2	−5.2
Liberal Democrats	Luigi Bille	176	6.1	+6.1
Rejoin EU	Richard Hewison	65	2.3	+2.3
TUSC	Martin Hudson	47	1.6	+1.6
Independent	Brian Ingram	13	0.5	+0.5
Majority		147	5.1	
Turnout		2,884		
Labour hold		Swing		

=== 2022 election ===
The election took place on 5 May 2022.

2022 Barnet London Borough Council election: Whetstone (2)
Party	Candidate	Votes	%	±%
Labour	Ella Rose	1,898		
Labour	Liron Velleman	1,625		
Conservative	Thomas Smith	1,336		
Conservative	Sachin Rajput	1,308		
Green	Andrew Newby	456		
Turnout				
Labour win (new seat)				
Labour win (new seat)				
