= Edgwarebury =

- Electoral ward for the Barnet London Borough Council
- Edgwarebury ward boundaries since 2022
- Borough: Barnet
- County: Greater London
- Population: 12,109 (2021) (Note: 2021 Census data reported for 2022 ward boundaries)
- Electorate: 8,279 (2022)
- Major settlements: Edgwarebury
- Area: 4,862 square kilometres (1,877 sq mi)

Current electoral ward
- Created: 2022
- Number of members: 2
- Councillors: Sarah Wardle; Lachhya Gurung
- Created from: Edgware, Hale
- GSS code: E05013638

Edgwarebury is an electoral ward in the London Borough of Barnet. The ward was first used in the 2022 elections. It returns two councillors to Barnet London Borough Council.

== List of councillors ==
Term	Councillor	Party
2022–present	Sarah Wardle	Conservative
2022–present	Lachhya Gurung	Conservative

== Barnet council elections ==
=== 2022 election ===
The election took place on 5 May 2022.

2022 Barnet London Borough Council election: Edgwarebury (2)
Party	Candidate	Votes	%	±%
Conservative	Sarah Wardle	1,749	48.4	
Conservative	Lachhya Gurung	1,691	46.8	
Labour	Josh Tapper	1,649	45.7	
Labour	Nila Patel	1,582	43.8	
Green	Samuel Murray	284	7.9	
Turnout		3,610	43.6	
Conservative win (new seat)				
Conservative win (new seat)				
