= Colindale South =

Electoral ward in Barnet, London, England

- Electoral ward for the Barnet London Borough Council
- Borough: Barnet
- County: Greater London
- Population: 19,413 (2021)
- Major settlements: Colindale
- Area: 1.631 km²

Current electoral ward
- Created: 2022
- Councillors: 3
- Created from: Colindale

Colindale South is an electoral ward in the London Borough of Barnet. The ward was first used in the 2022 elections. It elects three councillors to Barnet London Borough Council.

== Geography ==
The ward is named after the suburb of Colindale.

== Councillors ==
Election	Councillors		
2022	Gill Sargeant (Labour)	Nagus Narenthira (Labour)	Humayune Khalick (Labour)

== Elections ==
=== 2022 Barnet London Borough Council election ===
Colindale South (3 seats)
Party	Candidate	Votes	%	±%
Labour	Gill Sargeant*	2,008	64.1	
Labour	Nagus Narenthira*	1,936	61.8	
Labour	Humayune Khalick	1,888	60.3	
Conservative	Adam Collins	945	30.2	
Conservative	Shivaji Ghosh	807	25.8	
Conservative	Nigel Saidler	775	24.8	
Green	Rajul Shah	437	14.0	
Turnout		3,131	27.7	
Labour win (new seat)				
Labour win (new seat)				
Labour win (new seat)				
