= Cricklewood (ward) =

Electoral ward in Barnet, London, England

- Electoral ward for the Barnet London Borough Council
- Borough: Barnet
- County: Greater London
- Population: 10,723 (2021)
- Major settlements: Cricklewood
- Area: 2.088 km²

Current electoral ward
- Created: 2022
- Councillors: 2

Cricklewood is an electoral ward in the London Borough of Barnet. The ward was first used in the 2022 elections. It elects two councillors to Barnet London Borough Council.

== Geography ==
The ward is named after the town of Cricklewood.

== Councillors ==
Election	Councillors	
2022	Alan Schneiderman (Labour)	Anne Clarke (Labour)

== Elections ==
=== 2022 Barnet London Borough Council election ===
Cricklewood (2 seats)
Party	Candidate	Votes	%	±%
Labour Co-op	Anne Clarke*	1,314	69.7	
Labour Co-op	Alan Schneiderman*	1,109	58.8	
Conservative	Yosef David	415	22.0	
Conservative	Ajantha Tennakoon	356	18.9	
Green	Danielle Pollastri	192	10.2	
Liberal Democrats	Sophie Leighton	131	6.9	
Liberal Democrats	Charles Lawton	106	5.6	
Turnout		1,885	30.6	
Labour win (new seat)				
Labour win (new seat)				
