= West Finchley (ward) =

Electoral ward in Barnet, London, England

- Electoral ward for the Barnet London Borough Council
- Borough: Barnet
- County: Greater London
- Population: 19,430 (2021)
- Major settlements: Finchley
- Area: 2.457 km²

Current electoral ward
- Created: 2002
- Party: Labour
- Councillors: 3

West Finchley is an electoral ward in the London Borough of Barnet. The ward was first used in the 2002 elections. It elects three councillors to Barnet London Borough Council.

== Geography ==
The ward is named after the suburb of West Finchley.

== Councillors ==
Election	Councillors		
2022	Kath McGuirk (Labour)	Ross Houston (Labour)	Danny Rich (Labour)

== Elections ==
=== 2022 Barnet London Borough Council election ===
West Finchley (3 seats)
Party	Candidate	Votes	%	±%
Labour	Kath McGuirk*	2,952	52.7	
Labour	Ross Houston*	2,916	52.1	
Labour	Danny Rich*	2,724	48.6	
Liberal Democrats	Gabriel Rozenberg*	1,289	23.0	
Liberal Democrats	Clareine Enderby	1,203	21.5	
Conservative	Linda Savin	1,160	20.7	
Conservative	Robert Fucilla	1,106	19.8	
Conservative	Thomas Sheppard	1,081	19.3	
Liberal Democrats	Gregory Ruback	992	17.7	
Green	John Colmans	637	11.4	
Women's Equality	Ruth Vincenti	331	5.9	
Turnout		5,600	44.7	
Labour win (new boundaries)				
Labour win (new boundaries)				
Labour win (new boundaries)				
