= Colindale North =

Electoral ward in Barnet, London, England

- Electoral ward for the Barnet London Borough Council
- Borough: Barnet
- County: Greater London
- Population: 12,060 (2021)
- Major settlements: Colindale
- Area: 0.9976 km²

Current electoral ward
- Created: 2022
- Councillors: 2
- Created from: Colindale

Colindale North is an electoral ward in the London Borough of Barnet. The ward was first used in the 2022 elections. It elects two councillors to Barnet London Borough Council.

== Geography ==
The ward is named after the suburb of Colindale.

== Councillors ==
Election	Councillors	
2022	Andreas Ioannidis (Labour)	Zakia Zubairi (Labour)

== Elections ==
=== 2022 Barnet London Borough Council election ===
Colindale North (2 seats)
Party	Candidate	Votes	%	±%
Labour	Andreas Ioannidis	1,156	63.3	
Labour	Zakia Zubairi*	1,102	60.3	
Conservative	Ben Margulies	360	19.7	
Conservative	Joseph Prager	333	18.2	
Independent	Marcin Nocek	243	13.3	
Green	Maggie Curati	172	9.4	
Independent	Sabriye Warsame	91	5.0	
Turnout		1,827	25.1	
Labour win (new seat)				
Labour win (new seat)				
