= East Finchley (ward) =

Electoral ward in the London Borough of Barnet

- Electoral ward for the Barnet London Borough Council
- East Finchley ward boundaries since 2022
- Borough: Barnet
- County: Greater London
- Population: 16,639 (2021) (Note: 2021 Census data reported for 2022 ward boundaries)
- Electorate: 1,025 (2022)
- Major settlements: East Finchley
- Area: 2.525 square kilometres (0.975 sq mi)

Current electoral ward
- Created: 1968
- Number of members: 3
- Councillors: Arjun Mittra; Alison Moore; Claire Farrier
- GSS code: E05000049 (2002–2022); E05013636 (2022–present)

East Finchley is an electoral ward in the London Borough of Barnet. The ward was first used in the 1968 elections. It returns three councillors to Barnet London Borough Council.

== Barnet council elections since 2022 ==
There was a revision of ward boundaries in Barnet in 2022.

=== 2022 election ===
The election took place on 5 May 2022.

2022 Barnet London Borough Council election: East Finchley
Party	Candidate	Votes	%	±%
Labour Co-op	Arjun Mittra	3,122	64.9	
Labour Co-op	Alison Moore	3,001	62.4	
Labour Co-op	Claire Farrier	2,895	60.1	
Liberal Democrats	Julia Hines	924	19.2	
Liberal Democrats	David Noble	783	16.3	
Liberal Democrats	Sachin Patel	729	15.1	
Conservative	Robert Buckwell	671	13.9	
Conservative	Lesley Mcilmoyle	643	13.4	
Conservative	Megan Tucker	627	13.0	
Green	Steve Parsons	592	12.3	
Turnout		4,813	43.7	
Labour win (new boundaries)				
Labour win (new boundaries)				
Labour win (new boundaries)				
