= Woodhouse (ward) =

Electoral ward in Barnet, London, England

- Electoral ward for the Barnet London Borough Council
- Borough: Barnet
- County: Greater London
- Population: 13,914 (2021)
- Area: 2.055 km²

Current electoral ward
- Created: 1968
- Councillors: 2

Woodhouse is an electoral ward in the London Borough of Barnet. The ward was first used in the 1968 elections. It elects two councillors to Barnet London Borough Council.

== Geography ==
The ward is named after Woodhouse College.

== Councillors ==
Election	Councillors	
2022	Geof Cooke (Labour)	Anne Hutton (Labour)

== Elections ==
=== 2022 Barnet London Borough Council election ===
Woodhouse (2 seats)
Party	Candidate	Votes	%	±%
Labour	Geof Cooke*	1,917	55.5	
Labour	Anne Hutton*	1,900	55.0	
Conservative	Golnar Bokaei*	980	28.4	
Conservative	Shaan Owusu-Afriyie	891	25.8	
Green	David Burns	395	11.4	
Liberal Democrats	Gerard Fitzgerald	318	9.2	
Liberal Democrats	James Goldman	314	9.1	
Turnout		3,452	36.5	
Labour win (new boundaries)				
Labour win (new boundaries)				
