= East Barnet (ward) =

Electoral ward in Barnet, London, England

- Electoral ward for the Barnet London Borough Council
- Borough: Barnet
- County: Greater London
- Population: 18,143 (2021)
- Major settlements: East Barnet
- Area: 4,676/km²

Current electoral ward
- Created: 1965
- Councillors: 3

East Barnet is an electoral ward in the London Borough of Barnet. The ward was first used in the 1964 elections. It elects three councillors to Barnet London Borough Council.

== Geography ==
The ward is named after the area of East Barnet.

== Councillors ==
Election	Councillors		
2022	Philip Cohen (Labour)	Edith David (Labour)	Simon Radford (Labour)

== Elections ==
=== 2022 Barnet London Borough Council election ===
East Barnet (3 seats)
Party	Candidate	Votes	%	±%
Labour	Philip Cohen	2,547	48.4	
Labour	Edith David	2,514	47.8	
Labour	Simon Radford	2,342	44.5	
Conservative	Felix Byers*	2,229	42.4	
Conservative	Pavan Pavanakumar	2,055	39.1	
Conservative	Paul Roberts	2,023	38.5	
Green	Judith Echlin	628	11.9	
Liberal Democrats	Sean Hooker	374	7.1	
Liberal Democrats	David Nowell	280	5.3	
Liberal Democrats	David Keech	243	4.6	
Turnout		5,261	42.6	
Labour win (new boundaries)				
Labour win (new boundaries)				
Labour win (new boundaries)				
