= Mill Hill (ward) =

Electoral ward in Barnet, London, England

- Electoral ward for the Barnet London Borough Council
- Borough: Barnet
- County: Greater London
- Population: 18,307 (2021)
- Major settlements: Mill Hill
- Area: 7.800 km²

Current electoral ward
- Created: 1965
- Councillors: 3

Mill Hill is an electoral ward in the London Borough of Barnet. The ward was first used in the 1964 elections. It elects three councillors to Barnet London Borough Council.

== Geography ==
The ward is named after the suburb of Mill Hill.

== Councillors ==
Election	Councillors		
2022	Val Duschinsky (Conservative)	Laithe Jajeh (Conservative)	Elliot Simberg (Conservative)

== Elections ==
=== 2022 Barnet London Borough Council election ===
Mill Hill (3 seats)
Party	Candidate	Votes	%	±%
Conservative	Val Duschinsky*	2,010	45.1	
Conservative	Elliot Simberg*	1,909	42.9	
Conservative	Laithe Jajeh*	1,783	40.0	
Labour	Rachel Barker	1,565	35.1	
Labour	Frankie Grant	1,413	31.7	
Labour	Pascale Fanning-Tichborne	1,390	31.2	
Liberal Democrats	Roger Tichborne	735	16.5	
Liberal Democrats	Richard Logue	713	16.0	
Liberal Democrats	Donna Pickup	672	15.1	
Green	Elizabeth Wardle	441	9.9	
Women's Equality	Kay Lauer	262	5.9	
Turnout		4,453	35.7	
Conservative win (new boundaries)				
Conservative win (new boundaries)				
Conservative win (new boundaries)				
