= West Hendon (ward) =

Electoral ward in Barnet, London, England

- Electoral ward for the Barnet London Borough Council
- Borough: Barnet
- County: Greater London
- Population: 17,253 (2021)
- Major settlements: West Hendon
- Area: 3.152 km²

Current electoral ward
- Created: 1965
- Councillors: 3

West Hendon is an electoral ward in the London Borough of Barnet. The ward was first used in the 1964 elections. It elects three councillors to Barnet London Borough Council.

== Geography ==
The ward is named after the suburb of West Hendon.

== Councillors ==
Election	Councillors		
2022	Ernest Ambe (Labour)	Andrea Bilbow (Labour)	Rishikesh Chakraborty (Labour)

== Elections ==
=== 2022 Barnet London Borough Council election ===
West Hendon (3 seats)
Party	Candidate	Votes	%	±%
Labour	Andrea Bilbow	1,901	56.1	
Labour	Ernest Ambe	1,791	52.9	
Labour	Rishikesh Chakraborty	1,761	52.0	
Conservative	Pauline Lewis	1,027	30.3	
Conservative	Jeremy Ross	931	27.5	
Conservative	Harvey Odze	870	25.7	
Liberal Democrats	Helene Richman*	650	19.2	
Green	Tye Hunter	436	12.9	
Turnout		3,388	31.5	
Labour win (new boundaries)				
Labour win (new boundaries)				
Labour win (new boundaries)				
