= Garden Suburb (ward) =

Electoral ward in Barnet, London, England

- Electoral ward for the Barnet London Borough Council
- Borough: Barnet
- County: Greater London
- Population: 12,207 (2021)
- Major settlements: Hampstead Garden Suburb
- Area: 3.980 km²

Current electoral ward
- Created: 1965
- Councillors: 2

Garden Suburb is an electoral ward in the London Borough of Barnet. The ward was first used in the 1964 elections. It elects two councillors to Barnet London Borough Council.

== Geography ==
The ward is named after Hampstead Garden Suburb.

== Councillors ==
Election	Councillors	
2022	Rohit Grover (Conservative)	Michael Mire (Conservative)

== Elections ==
=== 2022 Barnet London Borough Council election ===
Garden Suburb (2 seats)
Party	Candidate	Votes	%	±%
Conservative	Rohit Grover*	1,895	49.2	
Conservative	Michael Mire	1,878	48.8	
Labour	Kathy Levine*	1,052	27.3	
Labour	Adam Kayani	878	22.8	
Liberal Democrats	Daniel Mermelstein	622	16.2	
Liberal Democrats	Altan Aybiyik	496	12.9	
Green	Nicolas Ceasar	369	9.6	
Independent	Brian Ingram	311	8.1	
Turnout		3,848	42.7	
Conservative win (new boundaries)				
Conservative win (new boundaries)				
