= Barnet London Borough Council elections =

Class of UK elections

Barnet London Borough Council in London, England is elected every four years. Since the last boundary changes in 2002, 63 councillors have been elected from 21 wards.

== Political control ==
Since the first election to the council in 1964 political control of the council has been held by the following parties:

| Election | Overall Control | Conservative | Labour | Lib Dem | Green |
|---|---|---|---|---|---|
| 1964 | Conservative | 37 | 13 | 6 | - |
| 1968 | Conservative | 56 | 3 | 1 | - |
| 1971 | Conservative | 43 | 17 | - | - |
| 1974 | Conservative | 42 | 17 | - | - |
| 1978 | Conservative | 49 | 10 | - | - |
| 1982 | Conservative | 48 | 12 | - | - |
| 1986 | Conservative | 39 | 18 | 3 | - |
| 1990 | Conservative | 39 | 18 | 3 | - |
| 1994 | No overall control | 29 | 25 | 6 | - |
| 1998 | No overall control | 28 | 26 | 6 | - |
| 2002 | Conservative | 33 | 24 | 6 | - |
| 2006 | Conservative | 37 | 20 | 6 | - |
| 2010 | Conservative | 39 | 21 | 2 | - |
| 2014 | Conservative | 32 | 30 | 1 | - |
| 2018 | Conservative | 38 | 25 | - | - |
| 2022 | Labour | 22 | 41 | - | - |
| 2026 | No overall control | 31 | 31 | - | 1 |

== Council elections ==
- 1964 Barnet London Borough Council election
- 1968 Barnet London Borough Council election (boundary changes increased the number of seats by four)
- 1971 Barnet London Borough Council election
- 1974 Barnet London Borough Council election
- 1978 Barnet London Borough Council election (boundary changes took place but the number of seats remained the same)
- 1982 Barnet London Borough Council election
- 1986 Barnet London Borough Council election
- 1990 Barnet London Borough Council election
- 1994 Barnet London Borough Council election (boundary changes took place but the number of seats remained the same) (Note: The Greater London and Hertfordshire (County Boundaries) Order 1992) (Note: The Barnet, Camden and Westminster (London Borough Boundaries) Order 1993) (Note: The Essex, Greater London and Hertfordshire (County and London Borough Boundaries) Order 1993) (Note: The North London Boroughs (London Borough Boundaries) Order 1993)
- 1998 Barnet London Borough Council election
- 2002 Barnet London Borough Council election (boundary changes increased the number of seats by three)
- 2006 Barnet London Borough Council election
- 2010 Barnet London Borough Council election
- 2014 Barnet London Borough Council election
- 2018 Barnet London Borough Council election
- 2022 Barnet London Borough Council election (boundary changes took place but the number of seats remained the same)
- 2026 Barnet London Borough Council election

== Borough result maps ==
1978 results map

1982 results map

1986 results map

1990 results map

1994 results map

1998 results map

2002 results map

2006 results map

2010 results map

2014 results map

2018 results map

2022 results map

2026 results map

== By-election results ==
By-elections occur when seats become vacant between council elections. Below is a summary of recent by-elections; full by-election results can be found by clicking on the by-election name.

| By-election | Date | Incumbent party | Winning party |
|---|---|---|---|
| Colindale by-election | 7 May 1970 | | Labour |
| Friern Barnet by-election | 10 June 1970 | | Conservative |
| Hadley by-election | 10 June 1970 | | Conservative |
| Childs Hill by-election | 25 September 1970 | | Conservative |
| East Finchley by-election | 27 July 1972 | | Labour |
| Brunswick Park by-election | 23 January 1975 | | Conservative |
| Woodhouse by-election | 28 October 1976 | | Conservative |
| Burnt Oak by-election | 14 April 1977 | | Labour |
| East Barnet by-election | 29 September 1977 | | Conservative |
| Hadley by-election | 22 November 1979 | Conservative | Conservative |
| St Paul's by-election | 27 October 1983 | Conservative | Labour |
| Hadley by-election | 20 November 1986 | Conservative | Conservative |
| Garden Suburb by-election | 27 November 1986 | Conservative | Conservative |
| Arkley by-election | 10 November 1988 | Conservative | Conservative |
| Garden Suburb by-election | 10 November 1988 | Conservative | Conservative |
| Arkley by-election | 9 March 1989 | Conservative | Conservative |
| Burnt Oak by-election | 6 June 1991 | Labour | Labour |
| Mill Hill by-election | 26 September 1991 | Conservative | Conservative |
| Garden Suburb by-election | 6 May 1993 | Conservative | Conservative |
| West Hendon by-election | 2 December 1993 | Labour | Labour |
| Colindale by-election | 14 March 1996 | Labour | Labour |
| Colindale by-election | 14 November 1996 | Labour | Labour |
| Edgware by-election | 14 November 1996 | Conservative | Conservative |
| Hendon by-election | 14 November 1996 | Conservative | Conservative |
| Woodhouse by-election | 10 December 1998 | Labour | Labour |
| Garden Suburb by-election | 23 November 2000 | Conservative | Conservative |
| Hadley by-election | 23 November 2000 | Conservative | Conservative |
| Mill Hill by-election | 23 November 2000 | Liberal Democrats | Liberal Democrats |
| Finchley by-election | 15 March 2001 | Conservative | Conservative |
| Burnt Oak by-election | 19 June 2003 | Labour | Labour |
| Hale by-election | 5 February 2004 | Labour | Labour |
| Colindale by-election | 7 April 2005 | Labour | Labour |
| Garden Suburb by-election | 5 May 2005 | Conservative | Conservative |
| High Barnet by-election | 15 December 2005 | Conservative | Liberal Democrats |
| East Barnet by-election | 8 February 2007 | Conservative | Conservative |
| Hale by-election | 1 May 2008 | Conservative | Conservative |
| Edgware by-election | 4 June 2009 | Conservative | Conservative |
| Totteridge by-election | 4 June 2009 | Conservative | Conservative |
| East Finchley by-election | 12 April 2012 | Labour | Labour |
| Brunswick Park by-election | 31 May 2012 | Conservative | Labour |
| Underhill by-election | 5 May 2016 | Labour | Labour |
| East Barnet by-election | 6 May 2021 | Labour | Conservative |
| Edgware by-election | 6 May 2021 | Conservative | Conservative |
| Golders Green by-election | 16 February 2023 | Conservative | Conservative |
| Barnet Vale by-election | 4 July 2024 | Labour | Labour |
| Burnt Oak by-election | 13 February 2025 | Labour | Labour |
| Finchley Church End by-election | 6 March 2025 | Conservative | Conservative |
| Whetstone by-election | 15 May 2025 | Labour | Labour |
| Hendon by-election | 30 October 2025 | Conservative | Conservative |
