= Finchley Church End (ward) =

Electoral ward in the London borough of Barnet

- Electoral ward for the Barnet London Borough Council
- Finchley Church End ward boundaries since 2022
- Borough: Barnet
- County: Greater London
- Population: 18,840 (2021) (Note: 2021 Census data reported for 2022 ward boundaries)
- Electorate: 12,991 (2022)
- Major settlements: Church End, Finchley
- Area: 2.988 square kilometres (1.154 sq mi)

Current electoral ward
- Created: 2002
- Number of members: 3
- Councillors: Jennifer Grocock; Vacancy; Josh Mastin-Lee
- GSS code: E05000051 (2002–2022); E05013639 (2022–present)

Finchley Church End is an electoral ward in the London Borough of Barnet. The ward was first used in the 2002 elections. It returns three councillors to Barnet London Borough Council.

== List of councillors ==
Term	Councillor	Party
2002–2025	Eva Greenspan	Conservative
2002–2006	Leslie Sussman	Conservative
2002–2010	Mike Freer	Conservative
2006–2025	Dan Thomas (Note: Dan Thomas changed parties in 2025.)	Conservative
2006–2025	Dan Thomas	Reform
2010–2018	Graham Old	Conservative
2018–present	Jennifer Grocock	Conservative
2025–present	Josh Mastin-Lee	Conservative

== Barnet council elections since 2022 ==
There was a revision of ward boundaries in Barnet in 2022.

=== 2026 election ===
Dan Thomas resigned in December 2025, with the by-election deferred until the 2026 Barnet London Borough Council election, part of the 2026 United Kingdom local elections. (Note: Casual vacancies occurring within six months of scheduled elections are not filled.)

=== 2025 by-election ===
The by-election took place on 6 March 2025, following the death of Eva Greenspan.

2025 Finchley Church End by-election
Party	Candidate	Votes	%	±%
Conservative	Josh Mastin-Lee	1,509	45.2	+4.2
Labour	Beverley Kotey	977	29.3	+2.8
Reform	Lisa Rutter	351	10.5	+10.5
Liberal Democrats	James Goldman	213	6.4	−19.1
Green	David Farbey	147	4.4	−3.7
Rejoin EU	Brendan Donnelly	119	3.6	+3.6
Independent	Brian Ingram	20	0.6	+0.6
Majority		532	15.9	
Turnout		3,336		
Conservative hold		Swing		

=== 2022 election ===
The election took place on 5 May 2022.

2022 Barnet London Borough Council election: Finchley Church End
Party	Candidate	Votes	%	±%
Conservative	Eva Greenspan	2,357	44.8	
Conservative	Jennifer Grocock	2,155	40.9	
Conservative	Dan Thomas	2,140	40.6	
Liberal Democrats	Sarah Hoyle	1,465	27.8	
Labour	Suzanne Baker	1,464	27.8	
Liberal Democrats	Dominic Aubrey-Jones	1,387	26.3	
Labour	Hilary Burrage	1,339	25.4	
Liberal Democrats	Daniel Fenesan	1,291	24.5	
Labour	Mary McGuirk	1,226	23.3	
Green	Nina Jacoby-Owen	464	8.8	
Turnout		5,266	40.5	
Conservative win (new boundaries)				
Conservative win (new boundaries)				
Conservative win (new boundaries)				

== 2002–2022 Barnet council elections ==
Finchley Church End ward boundaries from 2002 to 2022

=== 2018 election ===
The election took place on 3 May 2018.

2018 Barnet London Borough Council election: Finchley Church End
Party	Candidate	Votes	%	±%
Conservative	Eva Greenspan	3,429	64.9	+8.5
Conservative	Jennifer Grocock	3,192	60.5	+10.4
Conservative	Dan Thomas	3,050	57.8	+9.6
Labour	Karen Walkden	1,200	22.7	−4.9
Labour	Debs Heneghan	1,161	22.0	−4.4
Labour	Joel Salmon	1,141	21.6	−4.6
Liberal Democrats	Rita Landeryou	636	12.0	+5.3
Liberal Democrats	Frank Jackman	580	11.0	+5.1
Liberal Democrats	Charles Wakefield	517	9.8	+4.9
Turnout		5,280	46.9	
Conservative hold		Swing		
Conservative hold		Swing		
Conservative hold		Swing		

=== 2014 election ===
The election took place on 22 May 2014.

2014 Barnet London Borough Council election: Finchley Church End
Party	Candidate	Votes	%	±%
Conservative	Eva Greenspan	2,571	56.4	+2.4
Conservative	Graham Old	2,284	50.1	+3.0
Conservative	Dan Thomas	2,197	48.2	+0.2
Labour	Janet Bagley	1,257	27.6	+3.7
Labour	Mike Walsh	1,201	26.4	+5.0
Labour	Mary McGuirk	1,192	26.2	+2.9
Green	Vedantha Kumar	512	11.2	+5.0
UKIP	Amir Latif	365	8.0	N/A
Liberal Democrats	Diana Darrer	305	6.7	−6.7
Liberal Democrats	Sarah Hoyle	267	5.9	−8.8
Liberal Democrats	Sheila Yarwood	222	4.9	−6.0
Total votes		4,556		
Conservative hold		Swing		
Conservative hold		Swing		
Conservative hold		Swing		

=== 2010 election ===
The election on 6 May 2010 took place on the same day as the United Kingdom general election.

2010 Barnet London Borough Council election: Finchley Church End
Party	Candidate	Votes	%	±%
Conservative	Eva Greenspan	3,833	54.0	−9.4
Conservative	Dan Thomas	3,403	48.0	−10.5
Conservative	Graham Old	3,340	47.1	−14.8
Labour	Oliver Segal	1,696	23.9	+5.5
Labour	Mary McGuirk	1,652	23.3	+6.2
Labour	Arjun Mittra	1,515	21.4	+4.6
Liberal Democrats	Malcolm Davis	1,040	14.7	+1.9
Liberal Democrats	Diana Darrer	952	13.4	+1.0
Liberal Democrats	Sheila Yarwood	771	10.9	+0.3
Green	Paul Dunn	441	6.2	−7.6
Residents' Association	Estelle Phillips	341	4.8	N/A
Green	Donald Lyven	336	4.7	N/A
Residents' Association	Roger Enskat	324	4.6	N/A
Residents' Association	Brian Ross	321	4.5	N/A
Green	Andrew Shirlaw	283	4.0	N/A
Turnout		7,092	67.1	+24.3
Conservative hold		Swing		
Conservative hold		Swing		
Conservative hold		Swing		

=== 2006 election ===
The election took place on 4 May 2006.

2006 Barnet London Borough Council election: Finchley Church End
Party	Candidate	Votes	%	±%
Conservative	Eva Greenspan	2,604	63.4	+4.7
Conservative	Mike Freer	2,543	61.9	+7.5
Conservative	Dan Thomas	2,402	58.5	+2.0
Labour	Michael Walsh	756	18.4	−7.3
Labour	Brian Watkins	702	17.1	−8.3
Labour	Alan Paun	691	16.8	−8.0
Green	Miranda Dunn	567	13.8	+2.9
Liberal Democrats	Malcolm Davis	526	12.8	+2.1
Liberal Democrats	James Graham	508	12.4	+2.9
Liberal Democrats	Ingeborg Graber	435	10.6	+1.5
Turnout		4,106	42.8	+8.5
Conservative hold		Swing		
Conservative hold		Swing		
Conservative hold		Swing		

=== 2002 election ===
The election took place on 2 May 2002.

2002 Barnet London Borough Council election: Finchley Church End
Party	Candidate	Votes	%	±%
Conservative	Eva Greenspan	2,126	58.7	
Conservative	Leslie Sussman	2,047	56.5	
Conservative	Mike Freer	1,971	54.4	
Labour	Mary McGuirk	930	25.7	
Labour	Nick Guest	919	25.4	
Labour	Lily Mitchell	899	24.8	
Green	Miranda Dunn	396	10.9	
Liberal Democrats	Keith Rodwell	387	10.7	
Liberal Democrats	Millicent Watkins	344	9.5	
Liberal Democrats	Peter Lusher	331	9.1	
Turnout		3,623	34.3	
Conservative win (new seat)				
Conservative win (new seat)				
Conservative win (new seat)				
