= 1978 Barnet London Borough Council election =

1978 local election in England

← 1974	4 May 1978	1982 →

All 60 seats to Barnet London Borough Council 31 seats needed for a majority
- Turnout: 43.6%

	First party	Second party	Third party
Party	Conservative	Labour	Independent
Seats won	49	10	1
Percentage	57.1%	30.4%
- Map of the results of the 1978 Barnet London Borough council election. Conservatives in blue and Labour in red.
Council control before election
Conservative
Council control after election
Conservative

The 1978 Barnet Council election took place on 4 May 1978 to elect members of Barnet London Borough Council in London, England. The whole council was up for election and the Conservative Party stayed in overall control of the council.

== Background ==
Since the last election in 1974, the Local Government Boundary Commission carried out their first periodic electoral review of Barnet under the Local Government Act 1972 and made a number of boundary changes.

== Election result ==
Overall turnout in the election was 43.6%.

Barnet local election result 1978
Party	Seats	Gains	Losses	Net gain/loss	Seats %	Votes %	Votes	+/−
Conservative	49				81.7	57.1		
Labour	10				16.7	30.4		
Liberal	0				0.0	9.8		
Independent	1				1.6	2.7		

== Ward results ==
=== Arkley ===
Arkley (3 seats)
Party	Candidate	Votes	%	±%
Labour	Joan E. Pudney	2,495		
Conservative	John T. Thomson	2,416		
Conservative	Ann S.M. More	2,394		
Labour	Andrew P. Harris	2,275		
Labour	Trevor K. Hill	2,275		
Conservative	Stephen G. Lane	2,270		
Liberal	Richard W. Ellis	417		
Liberal	Keith Crawford	370		
Liberal	Cynthia Krieger	315		
Turnout			45.7%	
Labour win (new seat)				
Conservative win (new seat)				
Conservative win (new seat)				

=== Brunswick Park ===
Brunswick Park (3 seats)
Party	Candidate	Votes	%	±%
Conservative	June M. Cole	2,957		
Conservative	Anthony M. Rawle	2,951		
Conservative	Mary Temple	2,867		
Labour	Percy Cheek	967		
Labour	Gerald Eaton	953		
Labour	Jeffrey Leifer	866		
Liberal	David L. Stevens	359		
Liberal	Hugh J. Ogus	324		
Liberal	Valerie Silbiger	320		
Turnout			40.8%	
Conservative win (new seat)				
Conservative win (new seat)				
Conservative win (new seat)				

=== Burnt Oak ===
Burnt Oak (3 seats)
Party	Candidate	Votes	%	±%
Labour	James P. Brophy	2,192		
Labour	Bertram E. McCormack	2,063		
Labour	Harold B. Davies	2,060		
Conservative	Keith R. Bass	998		
Conservative	John R. Hart	972		
Conservative	Peter V. Wharton	873		
National Front	Edward V. Bradley	315		
National Front	Alfred T. Chamberlain	295		
National Front	Edward J. Warner	243		
Liberal	Hilda D. Munden	162		
Liberal	Gisela Page	130		
Liberal	Roger Pattison	128		
Turnout			38.3%	
Labour win (new seat)				
Labour win (new seat)				
Labour win (new seat)				

=== Childs Hill ===
Childs Hill (3 seats)
Party	Candidate	Votes	%	±%
Conservative	Alfred Young	1,904		
Conservative	Victor Lyon	1,896		
Conservative	Brian A. Jarman	1,868		
Labour	Donald E. Barnes	1,679		
Labour	Elizabeth C. Silver	1,541		
Labour	Mary C. Tyler	1,522		
Liberal	Monroe E. Palmer	1,054		
Liberal	Joan Lawson	907		
Liberal	Nigel R. Wilson	787		
National Front	Frederick W. Hurst	133		
Turnout			46.9%	
Conservative win (new seat)				
Conservative win (new seat)				
Conservative win (new seat)				

=== Colindale ===
Colindale (3 seats)
Party	Candidate	Votes	%	±%
Labour	Geoffrey N. Cooke	1,657		
Labour	Mary H.R. Honeyball	1,633		
Labour	Thomas A. McKendry	1,594		
Conservative	Peter A. Grosz	1,447		
Conservative	Derek M. Joseph	1,433		
Conservative	Jane B. Quail	1,389		
Liberal	Arthur J. Roycroft	211		
Liberal	Phyllis I. Adams	189		
Liberal	Paula Mercer	162		
National Front	David A. Farmer	157		
National Front	John R. McLaren	156		
National Front	Leslie C. Bourne	154		
Turnout			43.4%	
Labour win (new seat)				
Labour win (new seat)				
Labour win (new seat)				

=== East Barnet ===
East Barnet (3 seats)
Party	Candidate	Votes	%	±%
Conservative	Ernest T. Danks	2,697		
Conservative	Olwen M. Evans	2,555		
Conservative	John Perry	2,542		
Labour	Susan M. Doran	1,321		
Labour	Norman C. Bar	1,310		
Labour	Nicholas O. Landau	1,259		
Liberal	Barbara J. Hunt	341		
Liberal	Clive Robinson	340		
Liberal	Alexander W. Munden	298		
National Front	Ivor W. Sargent	174		
National Front	Daniel J. Monk	171		
National Front	Philip A. Ruddock	168		
Turnout			42.9%	
Conservative win (new seat)				
Conservative win (new seat)				
Conservative win (new seat)				

=== East Finchley ===
East Finchley (3 seats)
Party	Candidate	Votes	%	±%
Conservative	Barbara I. Langstone	1,950		
Conservative	Mary Phillips	1,894		
Conservative	Stanley J. Sorrell	1,858		
Labour	Martin J. O'Connor	1,827		
Labour	Michael D. O'Connor	1,751		
Labour	Kenneth W. Little	1,740		
Liberal	Andrew G. Christodoulou	351		
Liberal	Juliet S. Rowe	346		
Liberal	Bruce A. Standing	338		
Turnout			42.1%	
Conservative win (new seat)				
Conservative win (new seat)				
Conservative win (new seat)				

=== Edgware ===
Edgware (3 seats)
Party	Candidate	Votes	%	±%
Conservative	Geoffrey I. Greenhouse	3,772		
Conservative	David E. Dell	3,697		
Conservative	Archibald T.W. Smith	3,541		
Labour	Michael B. Desmond	1,506		
Labour	Lorna Levy	1,494		
Labour	Anthony M. Williams	1,383		
Liberal	Sidney W. Baier	177		
Liberal	Mary J. Grieb	176		
Liberal	Philip L. Smulian	152		
Turnout			48.6%	
Conservative win (new seat)				
Conservative win (new seat)				
Conservative win (new seat)				

=== Finchley ===
Finchley (3 seats)
Party	Candidate	Votes	%	±%
Conservative	Leslie Sussman	2,828		
Conservative	Miles C. Golding	2,784		
Conservative	Jean I. Parmer	2,730		
Labour	Robert A. Holroyd	1,222		
Labour	Brian J. Watkins	1,206		
Labour	David G. Williams	1,206		
Liberal	Gregory P.F. Robbins	488		
Liberal	Malcolm B. Davis	445		
Liberal	Sylvia T.D. Randall	426		
Turnout			41.4%	
Conservative win (new seat)				
Conservative win (new seat)				
Conservative win (new seat)				

=== Friern Barnet ===
Friern Barnet (3 seats)
Party	Candidate	Votes	%	±%
Conservative	David C. Burton	2,856		
Conservative	John C. Tiplady	2,831		
Conservative	Frank D. Gibson	2,827		
Labour	Peter R. Butcher	838		
Labour	Frank C. Edwards	812		
Labour	Charles F. Owen	809		
Liberal	Karl E. Ruge	565		
Liberal	Christopher Perkin	549		
Liberal	Yvonne A. Jessop	506		
Turnout			41.4%	
Conservative win (new seat)				
Conservative win (new seat)				
Conservative win (new seat)				

=== Garden Suburb ===
Garden Suburb (3 seats)
Party	Candidate	Votes	%	±%
Conservative	Michael G. Max	2,995		
Conservative	Richard Blausten	2,985		
Conservative	Phyllis M. Nevard	2,830		
Independent	Patrick K. Laurance	1,102		
Labour	David E. De Saxe	916		
Labour	Richard M. Hadley	873		
Liberal	Leonie E. Stephen	796		
Labour	Stephen E. Pudney	781		
Liberal	Clive R. Silbiger	776		
Liberal	Robert S. Hanison	702		
Turnout			48.1%	
Conservative win (new seat)				
Conservative win (new seat)				
Conservative win (new seat)				

=== Golders Green ===
Golders Green (3 seats)
Party	Candidate	Votes	%	±%
Conservative	Rosa A. Freedman	2,450		
Conservative	Leslie D. Foster	2,303		
Conservative	Selina D. Summers	2,214		
Labour	Stephen F. Kelly	1,203		
Labour	Olga G. Deaner	1,162		
Labour	Vivien D. Marcy	1,133		
Liberal	Jeffrey Land	554		
Liberal	Susette S. Palmer	491		
Liberal	Wilfred Newton	485		
Turnout			39.3%	
Conservative win (new seat)				
Conservative win (new seat)				
Conservative win (new seat)				

=== Hadley ===
Hadley (3 seats)
Party	Candidate	Votes	%	±%
Conservative	Ernest A.E. Asker	3,587		
Independent	Anthony J. Freake	3,245		
Conservative	David P. Clarke	3,042		
Conservative	Rosemary W. Middleton	2,894		
Labour	Jean M. Feldman	980		
Labour	Brenda M. Slade	959		
Labour	Sylvia V. Grant	920		
Liberal	Peter J. Morley	827		
Liberal	Mavis W. Axham	697		
Turnout			48.0%	
Conservative win (new seat)				
Independent win (new seat)				
Conservative win (new seat)				

=== Hale ===
Hale (3 seats)
Party	Candidate	Votes	%	±%
Conservative	Leslie J. Pym	3,117		
Conservative	Dorothy B. Benson	3,082		
Conservative	Jack Clarfelt	3,038		
Labour	Peter J. Fordham	1,011		
Labour	Jean Smith	1,010		
Labour	Ian B. Morley	1,009		
Liberal	Diana C. Pattison	480		
Liberal	Carol A. Cooper	471		
Liberal	Laurian Davies	420		
National Front	Kenneth J. Barson	133		
National Front	John P. Smith	126		
National Front	Albert V. White	104		
Turnout			46.1%	
Conservative win (new seat)				
Conservative win (new seat)				
Conservative win (new seat)				

=== Hendon ===
Hendon (3 seats)
Party	Candidate	Votes	%	±%
Conservative	Norman E. Hirshfield	2,954		
Conservative	Victor S. Hockley	2,784		
Conservative	John Archard-Jones	2,564		
Labour	Celia A. Downs	1,246		
Labour	Christopher H. Jacobs	1,216		
Labour	Alan M. Magnus	1,188		
Liberal	Gerald Finlay	478		
Liberal	Peter G. Kempster	355		
Liberal	Elvin P. Sorkin	337		
Turnout			40.3%	
Conservative win (new seat)				
Conservative win (new seat)				
Conservative win (new seat)				

=== Mill Hill ===
Mill Hill (3 seats)
Party	Candidate	Votes	%	±%
Conservative	Rita M. Levy	3,321		
Conservative	Denis L. Dippel	3,316		
Conservative	Graham G. Fear	3,232		
Labour	Howard S. Bluston	943		
Labour	Leonard Phillips	924		
Labour	Ian Leslie	875		
Liberal	Adrian V. Stokes	390		
Liberal	Ronald N. Page	351		
Liberal	John F. Hearn	309		
National Front	Paul A. Clayton	173		
National Front	John B. Cording	149		
National Front	Susan E. Warner	133		
Turnout			45.4%	
Conservative win (new seat)				
Conservative win (new seat)				
Conservative win (new seat)				

=== St Paul's ===
St Paul's (3 seats)
Party	Candidate	Votes	%	±%
Conservative	John P. Fitzgibbon	2,346		
Conservative	Edna P. James	2,260		
Conservative	Norman J. Sapsted	2,224		
Labour	John A. Cogger	1,491		
Labour	Charles A.R. Still	1,448		
Labour	Ralph A. Straker	1,423		
Liberal	Patricia M. Dunnill	516		
Liberal	Leonard Watkins	459		
Liberal	Avron M. Potter	455		
Turnout			40.9%	
Conservative win (new seat)				
Conservative win (new seat)				
Conservative win (new seat)				

=== Totteridge ===
Totteridge (3 seats)
Party	Candidate	Votes	%	±%
Conservative	Margaret J. Laskey	3,639		
Conservative	Michael J. Hill	3,588		
Conservative	Victor H. Usher	3,575		
Labour	Howard R. Denton	889		
Labour	Michael S. Cohen	868		
Labour	Lawrence J. Rogoff	844		
Liberal	David M. Cohen	489		
Liberal	Edith M. Gardner	488		
Turnout			43.6%	
Conservative win (new seat)				
Conservative win (new seat)				
Conservative win (new seat)				

=== West Hendon ===
West Hendon (3 seats)
Party	Candidate	Votes	%	±%
Labour	Timothy J.K. Sims	2,142		
Labour	Donald E. Timms	2,116		
Labour	Doreen N. Neail	2,025		
Conservative	Stuart A. Goldenberg	1,998		
Conservative	Maurice J. Sultoon	1,976		
Conservative	Marion H. Babington	1,856		
Liberal	Brian E.J. Ellis	938		
Liberal	Harry J. Levy	887		
Liberal	Anthony D. Mercer	660		
Turnout			48.3%	
Labour win (new seat)				
Labour win (new seat)				
Labour win (new seat)				

=== Woodhouse ===
Woodhouse (3 seats)
Party	Candidate	Votes	%	±%
Conservative	Philip H. Williams	2,327		
Conservative	William G. Hart	2,306		
Conservative	Barry C. Francis	2,265		
Labour	Adrian R. Cattermole	1,535		
Labour	John S. Whale	1,444		
Labour	Hukam C. Chopra	1,410		
Liberal	Roger J. Aron	409		
Liberal	Barry N. Green	378		
Liberal	David A. Harris	367		
Turnout			40.1%	
Conservative win (new seat)				
Conservative win (new seat)				
Conservative win (new seat)				

== By-elections between 1978 and 1982 ==
=== Hadley ===
Hadley by-election, 22 November 1979
Party	Candidate	Votes	%	±%
Conservative	Donald E. Baker	1,344		
Residents	Eric W. Spalding	1,053		
Liberal	Peter J. Morley	501		
Labour	Jean M. Feldman	418		
Turnout			25.2	
Conservative hold		Swing		

The by-election was called following the death of Cllr. Ernest A. E. Asker.
