= 1971 Barnet London Borough Council election =

1971 local election in England

← 1968	13 May 1971	1974 →

All 60 seats to Barnet London Borough Council 31 seats needed for a majority
- Turnout: 36.8

	First party	Second party	Third party
Party	Conservative	Labour	Liberal
Seats before	56	3	1
Seats won	43	17	0
Seat change	▼13	▲14	▼1
Percentage	49.4%	37.8%	11.6%
Swing	▼13.1%	▲20.8%	▼8.7%
Council control before election
Conservative
Council control after election
Conservative

The 1971 Barnet Council election took place on 13 May 1971 to elect members of Barnet London Borough Council in London, England. The whole council was up for election and the Conservative Party stayed in overall control of the council. There were 43 Conservative councillors and 17 Labour, and also 5 aldermen, all Conservative.

== Election result ==
Overall turnout in the election was 36.8%.

Barnet local election result 1971
Party	Seats	Gains	Losses	Net gain/loss	Seats %	Votes %	Votes	+/−
Conservative	43	0	13	-13	71.7	49.4		-13.1
Labour	17	14	0	+14	28.3	37.8		+20.8
Liberal	0	0	1	-1	0.0	11.6		-8.7

== Ward results ==
=== Arkley ===
Arkley
Party	Candidate	Votes	%	±%
Labour	Mrs J. E. Pudney	2,117		
Labour	J. C. Stevenson	2,108		
Labour	Mrs L. Levy	1,938		
Conservative	R. R. Stevenson	1,860		
Conservative	P. G. H. Woodruff	1,718		
Conservative	Mrs A. E. Brum	1,714		
Independent Ratepayer	C. Macdonald	1,254		
Turnout			41.4	
Labour gain from Conservative		Swing		
Labour gain from Conservative		Swing		
Labour gain from Conservative		Swing		

=== Brunswick Park ===
Brunswick Park
Party	Candidate	Votes	%	±%
Conservative	J. S. Payne	2,379		
Conservative	A. C. Seaton	2,363		
Conservative	Miss M. Temple	2,320		
Labour	Miss E. M. Gregg	1,098		
Labour	J. Britz	1,067		
Labour	Mrs F. E. Stone	1,037		
Liberal	K. J. Fowler	622		
Liberal	Miss G. M. Oliver	577		
Liberal	S. W. F. Stockwell	570		
Turnout			37.2	
Conservative hold		Swing		
Conservative hold		Swing		
Conservative hold		Swing		

=== Burnt Oak ===
Burnt Oak
Party	Candidate	Votes	%	±%
Labour	J. S. Champion	3,468		
Labour	R. Robinson	3,327		
Labour	C. A. R. Lathrope	3,297		
Conservative	C. Turbutt	471		
Conservative	F. P. Bignell	459		
Conservative	A. D. C. Allan	444		
Turnout			39.9	
Labour hold		Swing		
Labour Co-op hold		Swing		
Labour hold		Swing		

=== Childs Hill ===
Childs Hill
Party	Candidate	Votes	%	±%
Conservative	K. W. Hughes	1,680		
Labour	S. Pollard	1,655		
Conservative	B. A. Jarman	1,644		
Labour	B. K. Sanderson	1,611		
Conservative	V. Lyon	1,605		
Labour	D. H. T. Hammonds	1,567		
Liberal	M. E. Palmer	770		
Liberal	Mrs J. Strong	663		
Liberal	P. L. Smulian	661		
Turnout			34.5	
Conservative hold		Swing		
Labour gain from Conservative		Swing		
Conservative hold		Swing		

=== Colindale ===
Colindale
Party	Candidate	Votes	%	±%
Labour	B. E. McCormack	2,036		
Labour	Miss R. A. Thorpe-Tracey	1,810		
Labour	A. M. Williams	1,776		
Conservative	Mrs S. P. Capper	1,123		
Conservative	C. W. Langley	1,054		
Conservative	J. P. Tanner	1,037		
Liberal	J. F. Hearn	241		
Liberal	Mrs G. E. Richards	209		
Liberal	Mrs C. T. Stokes	208		
Turnout			45.2	
Labour gain from Conservative		Swing		
Labour gain from Conservative		Swing		
Labour gain from Conservative		Swing		

=== East Barnet ===
East Barnet
Party	Candidate	Votes	%	±%
Labour	W. Seagroatt	2,561		
Conservative	A. Pares	2,560		
Conservative	Mrs M. L. Slack	2,543		
Conservative	J. E. Park	2,537		
Labour	L. R. Kealey	2,304		
Labour	Mrs H. J. Block	2,284		
Turnout			44.7	
Labour gain from Conservative		Swing		
Conservative hold		Swing		
Conservative hold		Swing		

=== East Finchley ===
East Finchley
Party	Candidate	Votes	%	±%
Labour	M. L. Freeman	2,414		
Labour	M. S. Hefferman	2,231		
Labour	M. J. O'Connor	2,219		
Conservative	T. J. Carter	1,664		
Conservative	Mrs T. Z. Barnes	1,552		
Conservative	C. W. Wilds	1,549		
Liberal	D. M. Cohen	279		
Liberal	M. B. Davis	269		
Liberal	B. F. Khan-Panni	214		
Turnout			37.5	
Labour gain from Conservative		Swing		
Labour gain from Conservative		Swing		
Labour gain from Liberal		Swing		

=== Edgware ===
Edgware
Party	Candidate	Votes	%	±%
Conservative	J. D. Apthrop	2,259		
Conservative	D. D. Dell	2,235		
Conservative	A. T. W. Smith	2,193		
Labour	L. Marks	1,549		
Labour	Miss V. E. Morris	1,508		
Labour	Mrs C. Gordon	1,491		
Liberal	S. Lawson	359		
Liberal	F. Alberg	351		
Liberal	S. L. Shipton	315		
Turnout			35.0	
Conservative hold		Swing		
Conservative hold		Swing		
Conservative hold		Swing		

=== Finchley ===
Finchley
Party	Candidate	Votes	%	±%
Conservative	Mrs E. R. Gibson	2,032		
Conservative	L. Susman	2,019		
Conservative	M. Golding	2,010		
Labour	J. M. Deaner	954		
Labour	Mrs H. Pennington	933		
Labour	R. H. Burbury	930		
Liberal	S. B. Salik	459		
Liberal	Mrs M. A. Harris	435		
Liberal	Mrs V. F. Silbiger	421		
Turnout			29.0	
Conservative hold		Swing		
Conservative hold		Swing		
Conservative hold		Swing		

=== Friern Barnet ===
Friern Barnet
Party	Candidate	Votes	%	±%
Conservative	Mrs E. Constable	2,424		
Conservative	J. C. Tiplady	2,357		
Conservative	W. L. Pearson	2,348		
Labour	T. C. Pugh	904		
Labour	M. B. De Vane	838		
Labour	R. K. Malvanker	807		
Liberal	Mrs G. A. R. Morris	592		
Liberal	S. C. Winter	572		
Liberal	R. J. Aron	549		
Turnout			34.0	
Conservative hold		Swing		
Conservative hold		Swing		
Conservative hold		Swing		

=== Garden Suburb ===
Garden Suburb
Party	Candidate	Votes	%	±%
Conservative	J. J. Fischer	2,410		
Conservative	P. K. Laurance	2,366		
Conservative	Mrs P. M. Nevard	2,344		
Liberal	Q. J. Iwi	1,197		
Liberal	L. S. Brass	1,126		
Liberal	M. J. Panting	1,062		
Labour	D. E. De Saxe	891		
Labour	C. Albu	870		
Labour	R. Warner	798		
Turnout			36.5	
Conservative hold		Swing		
Conservative hold		Swing		
Conservative hold		Swing		

=== Golders Green ===
Golders Green
Party	Candidate	Votes	%	±%
Conservative	Mrs R. A. Freedman	1,688		
Conservative	C. F. Harris	1,642		
Conservative	J. S. Alexander	1,588		
Labour	L. W. Cole	1,544		
Labour	F. Deutsch	1,500		
Labour	mRS B. Scharf	1,446		
Liberal	Mrs P. Fiander	662		
Liberal	W. Newton	648		
Liberal	V. J. Rosoux	594		
Communist	J. W. Pinder	114		
Turnout			32.1	
Conservative hold		Swing		
Conservative hold		Swing		
Conservative hold		Swing		

=== Hadley ===
Hadley
Party	Candidate	Votes	%	±%
Conservative	E. A. E. Asker	2,937		
Conservative	Mrs R. W. Middleton	2,704		
Conservative	Mrs M. M. Symons	2,554		
Local Independent	A. J. Freake	1,585		
Labour	D. C. Candler	1,063		
Labour	R. H. Potter	1,051		
Labour	C. J. Grammer	1,018		
Liberal	Mrs M. G. Snow	755		
Liberal	B. A. Standing	624		
Liberal	K. D. Sayers	559		
Turnout			39.3	
Conservative hold		Swing		
Conservative hold		Swing		
Conservative hold		Swing		

=== Hale ===
Hale
Party	Candidate	Votes	%	±%
Conservative	L. J. Pym	2,352		
Conservative	A. G. Risdon	2,327		
Conservative	M. Foux	2,268		
Labour	M. S. Cohen	1,374		
Labour	G. McClelland	1,358		
Labour	Mrs V. A. Bethell	1,341		
Liberal	B. A. Simmons	696		
Liberal	Mrs D. C. Pattison	695		
Liberal	F. I. West	660		
Turnout			39.5	
Conservative hold		Swing		
Conservative hold		Swing		
Conservative hold		Swing		

=== Hendon ===
Hendon
Party	Candidate	Votes	%	±%
Conservative	J. D. Gordon-Lee	2,553		
Conservative	N. E. Hirshfield	2,318		
Conservative	V. S. Hockley	2,249		
Labour	L. Dinnie	1,532		
Labour	Mrs M. Lewis	1,524		
Labour	D. Ramage	1,446		
Liberal	D. T. Baron	1,103		
Liberal	Mrs A. S. Godfrey	984		
Liberal	A. B. L. Gower	902		
Turnout			38.9	
Conservative hold		Swing		
Conservative hold		Swing		
Conservative hold		Swing		

=== Mill Hill ===
Mill Hill
Party	Candidate	Votes	%	±%
Conservative	A. P. Fletcher	2,783		
Conservative	Mrs C. M. Thubrun	2,735		
Conservative	A. Musgrave-Scott	2,689		
Labour	J. H. Husband	1,549		
Labour	W. C. Russell	1,444		
Labour	C. R. Stevens	1,342		
Liberal	C. M. Marks	842		
Liberal	A. V. Stokes	778		
Liberal	Mrs G. Page	773		
Turnout			43.6	
Conservative hold		Swing		
Conservative hold		Swing		
Conservative hold		Swing		

=== St Paul’s ===
St Paul’s
Party	Candidate	Votes	%	±%
Conservative	J. P. Fitzgibbon	2,094		
Conservative	Mrs E. P. James	2,030		
Conservative	N. J. Sapsted	2,023		
Labour	G. Dunn	1,018		
Labour	Mrs J. M. Allen	989		
Labour	W. G. Reid	971		
Liberal	Miss M. E. Lister	927		
Liberal	L. W. Watkins	919		
Liberal	L. J. Rubin	856		
Turnout			32.4	
Conservative hold		Swing		
Conservative hold		Swing		
Conservative hold		Swing		

=== Totteridge ===
Totteridge
Party	Candidate	Votes	%	±%
Conservative	Mrs B. M. Franklin	3,056		
Conservative	F. D. Gibson	3,044		
Conservative	V. H. Usher	3,034		
Labour	Mrs E. Grigg	958		
Labour	H. J. Gross	935		
Labour	Miss C. A. Ruse	911		
Turnout			33.6	
Conservative hold		Swing		
Conservative hold		Swing		
Conservative hold		Swing		

=== West Hendon ===
West Hendon
Party	Candidate	Votes	%	±%
Labour	T. J. Sims	1,650		
Labour	F. L. Tyler	1,629		
Labour	J. D. Roith	1,600		
Conservative	Mrs N. I. Cullinane	1,384		
Conservative	W. C. James	1,366		
Conservative	Mrs J. G. Burtchett	1,348		
Liberal	Mrs R. De Yong	254		
Liberal	Miss J. E. H. Walker	239		
Liberal	F. Olins	221		
Turnout			34.8	
Labour gain from Conservative		Swing		
Labour gain from Conservative		Swing		
Labour gain from Conservative		Swing		

=== Woodhouse ===
Woodhouse
Party	Candidate	Votes	%	±%
Conservative	Mrs D. G. Bradbury	1,849		
Conservative	D. C. Burton	1,833		
Conservative	K. A. Clarke	1,822		
Labour	A. E. Tomlinson	1,748		
Labour	R. S. Dunn	1,706		
Labour	J. S. Henley	1,665		
Liberal	C. B. Purkis	381		
Liberal	H. C. S. Bass	368		
Liberal	P. D. Watkins	367		
Turnout			31.7	
Conservative hold		Swing		
Conservative hold		Swing		
Conservative hold		Swing		

== By-elections between 1971 and 1974 ==
=== East Finchley ===
East Finchley by-election, 27 July 1972
Party	Candidate	Votes	%	±%
Labour	M. A. Cohen	1,546		
Conservative	C. W. Wilds	903		
Liberal	L. W. Watkins	726		
Turnout			29.9%	
