= 2006 Barnet London Borough Council election =

2006 local election in England

- 4 May 2006

All 63 seats to Barnet London Borough Council 32 seats needed for a majority
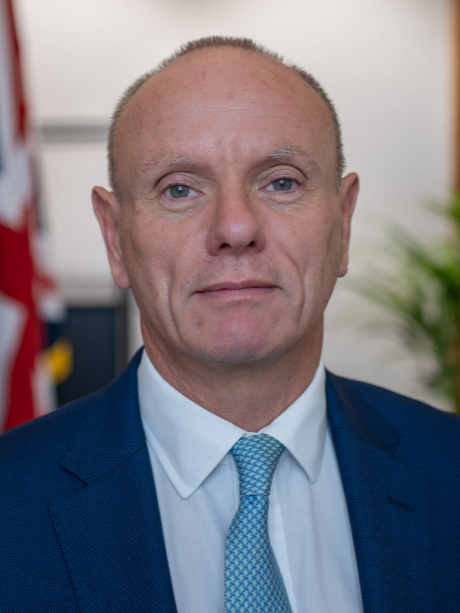
	First party	Second party	Third party
Leader	Mike Freer
Party	Conservative	Labour	Liberal Democrats
Seats won	37	20	6
Seat change	▲4	▼4	Steady
Popular vote	39,998	25,492	18,912
Percentage	41.7%	26.6%	19.7%
Swing	▲2.0%	▼7.3%	▲2.6%
- Map of the results of the 2006 Barnet council election. Conservatives in blue, Labour in red and Liberal Democrats in yellow.
Council control before election
Conservative
Council control after election
Conservative

The 2006 Barnet Council election took place on 4 May 2006 to elect members of Barnet London Borough Council in London, England. The whole council was up for election and the Conservative Party stayed in overall control of the council.

== Background ==
The last election in 2002 saw the Conservatives gain a majority of seats after winning 33 seats, compared to 24 for Labour and 6 Liberal Democrats. In December 2005 the Liberal Democrats gained a seat in High Barnet from the Conservatives in a by-election, after having come third in the ward in 2002. This meant that before the election the Conservatives had 31 seats, the Labour party 24, Liberal Democrats 7 and 1, formerly Conservative, seat was vacant.

A total of 219 candidates stood in the election for the 63 seats being contested across 21 wards. These included a full slate from the Conservative and Labour parties, while the Liberal Democrats had 3 candidates in all but one ward. Other candidates included the Green Party who stood at least one candidate in each ward, as well as 3 from the United Kingdom Independence Party, 1 Victory United candidate and 2 independents. 14 councillors did not stand for re-election and a further 1, Daniel Hope, stood in a different ward.

== Election result ==
The results saw the Conservatives increase their majority to 11 after winning 37 of the 63 seats. Overall turnout in the election was 41.65%, an increase on the 2002 election turnout of 34%. This turnout included 33,892 postal votes, a rise from 29,195 in 2002.

Following the election the Conservative leader of the council, Brian Salinger, lost a vote of no confidence in the Conservative group by 21 votes to 16 and was replaced as leader by his deputy Mike Freer.

Barnet local election result 2006
Party	Seats	Gains	Losses	Net gain/loss	Seats %	Votes %	Votes	+/−
Conservative	37	5	2	+3	58.7	41.7	39,998	
Labour	20	0	4	-4	31.7	26.6	25,492	
Liberal Democrats	6	1	1	0	9.5	19.7	18,912	
Green	0	0	0	0	0.0	10.3	9,930	
Independent	0	0	0	0	0.0	1.4	1,348	
UKIP	0	0	0	0	0.0	0.3	246	
Victory United	0	0	0	0	0.0	0.1	71	

== Ward results ==
=== Brunswick Park ===
Brunswick Park (3 seats)
Party	Candidate	Votes	%	±%
Conservative	Lynne Hillan*	2,827	63.5	+13.2
Conservative	Andreas Tambourides*	2,722	61.2	+10.6
Conservative	Lisa Rutter	2,636	59.2	+8.8
Labour	Mary Groom	680	15.3	−20.8
Liberal Democrats	Peter Finlayson	618	13.9	+3.6
Labour	Francis McGrath	609	13.7	−19.5
Labour	Robert Persad	600	13.5	−19.5
Liberal Democrats	Elliot Davis	584	13.1	+3.3
Liberal Democrats	Filiz Mustafa	515	11.6	+4.4
Green	Lee Povey	427	9.6	+3.9
UKIP	Martyn Eade	246	5.5	N/A
UKIP	Primrose Chamberlin	224	5.0	N/A
UKIP	Richard Roper	213	4.8	N/A
Turnout		4,449	42.6	+1.8
Conservative hold		Swing		
Conservative hold		Swing		
Conservative hold		Swing		

=== Burnt Oak ===
Burnt Oak (3 seats)
Party	Candidate	Votes	%	±%
Labour	Claire Farrier*	2,078	64.9	−4.7
Labour	Linda McFadyen*	1,886	58.9	−3.3
Labour	Charlie O-Macauley	1,836	57.4	−11.4
Conservative	Rene Braun	571	17.8	+0.7
Conservative	Patricia Sparrow	555	17.3	−0.4
Conservative	William Nicholson	522	16.3	−0.8
Liberal Democrats	Henry Feszczur	381	11.9	+8.5
Liberal Democrats	Jason Moleman	349	10.9	+4.9
Liberal Democrats	Diana Iwi	348	10.9	+4.9
Green	Andrea Poppy	329	10.3	+2.2
Turnout		3,201	32.4	+8.1
Labour hold		Swing		
Labour hold		Swing		
Labour hold		Swing		

=== Childs Hill ===
Childs Hill (3 seats)
Party	Candidate	Votes	%	±%
Liberal Democrats	Monroe Palmer*	1,705	44.2	−7.0
Liberal Democrats	Jack Cohen*	1,695	44.0	−7.3
Liberal Democrats	Susette Palmer*	1,635	42.4	−6.7
Conservative	Michael Angel	1,339	34.7	+10.0
Conservative	Sheila Angel	1,298	33.7	+10.9
Conservative	Vanessa Gearson	1,233	32.0	+10.7
Labour	Stephen Evans	613	15.9	−4.8
Labour	Farima Hasan	599	15.5	−4.0
Labour	Nicholas Guest	578	15.0	−2.5
Green	Christine Antoniou	449	11.6	+3.3
Turnout		3,856	36.1	+6.8
Liberal Democrats hold		Swing		
Liberal Democrats hold		Swing		
Liberal Democrats hold		Swing		

=== Colindale ===
Colindale (3 seats)
Party	Candidate	Votes	%	±%
Labour	Danish Chopra*	1,442	54.9	−7.0
Labour	Gillian Sargeant*	1,348	51.3	−10.0
Labour	Zakia Zubairi*	1,339	51.0	−6.4
Conservative	James Fluss	572	21.8	+4.1
Conservative	Keith Dyall	566	21.5	+3.8
Liberal Democrats	David Burcombe	472	18.0	+6.8
Liberal Democrats	Daniel Estermann	417	15.9	+2.1
Conservative	Alan Maund	414	15.8	−1.8
Liberal Democrats	Philip Reynolds	403	15.3	+2.0
Green	Elaine Cass	312	11.9	+4.6
Turnout		2,628	31.0	+10.3
Labour hold		Swing		
Labour hold		Swing		
Labour hold		Swing		

=== Coppetts ===
Coppetts (3 seats)
Party	Candidate	Votes	%	±%
Labour	Barry Rawlings*	1,557	38.4	−10.8
Conservative	Catherine Salinger	1,541	38.0	+7.3
Conservative	Mukesh Depala	1,445	35.7	+4.1
Labour	Paul Rogers*	1,430	35.3	−16.0
Labour	Soon Teh*	1,405	34.7	−9.9
Conservative	Filip Slipaczek	1,366	33.7	+4.7
Green	Soloman Natelson	499	12.3	N/A
Liberal Democrats	Mark Ashfield	488	12.0	−0.5
Green	Carl Hargreaves	485	12.0	N/A
Green	David Gutmann	480	11.8	+1.0
Liberal Democrats	Alex Hegazy	466	11.5	−0.9
Liberal Democrats	Rosalyn Rappaport	438	10.8	−0.1
Turnout		4,052	40.0	+8.2
Labour hold		Swing		
Conservative gain from Labour		Swing		
Conservative gain from Labour		Swing		

=== East Barnet ===
East Barnet (3 seats)
Party	Candidate	Votes	%	±%
Conservative	Olwen Evans*	2,430	48.5	+2.2
Conservative	Terence Burton*	2,408	48.0	+3.4
Conservative	Robert Rams	2,301	45.9	+1.5
Labour	Pauline Webb	1,794	35.8	−6.5
Labour	Kathleen Levine	1,639	32.7	−5.8
Labour	Austin Harney	1,567	31.2	−5.4
Liberal Democrats	Elizabeth Wardle	623	12.4	+2.5
Green	Howard Javes	562	11.2	+2.8
Liberal Democrats	Victor Corney	538	10.7	+1.2
Liberal Democrats	Charles Wicksteed	421	8.4	−0.1
Turnout		5,015	46.3	+5.7
Conservative hold		Swing		
Conservative hold		Swing		
Conservative hold		Swing		

=== East Finchley ===
East Finchley (3 seats)
Party	Candidate	Votes	%	±%
Labour	Alison Moore*	1,852	44.1	−9.9
Labour	Andrew McNeil	1,767	42.1	−8.8
Labour	Colin Rogers*	1,767	42.1	−9.7
Conservative	John Scott	1,080	25.7	+2.1
Conservative	Rachel Beard	1,078	25.7	+3.6
Conservative	James Bury	1,073	25.6	+4.2
Green	Noel Lynch	748	17.8	+1.0
Liberal Democrats	Joyce Arram	745	17.8	+3.1
Liberal Democrats	Dominic Church	640	15.3	+2.2
Green	Stephen Norman	586	14.0	N/A
Liberal Democrats	Marianne Sladowsky	555	13.2	+3.4
Turnout		4,196	42.9	+7.8
Labour hold		Swing		
Labour hold		Swing		
Labour hold		Swing		

=== Edgware ===
Edgware (3 seats)
Party	Candidate	Votes	%	±%
Conservative	Richard Weider	2,199	52.9	+1.3
Conservative	Helena Hart*	2,086	50.2	−1.6
Conservative	Joan Scannell*	2,018	48.6	−1.3
Labour	Alexander Brodkin	1,068	25.7	−1.2
Labour	John Johnston	942	22.7	−2.3
Liberal Democrats	Elias Abeles	901	21.7	+5.2
Labour	Alan Senitt	854	20.6	−3.3
Liberal Democrats	Michael Goodman	682	16.4	+8.3
Liberal Democrats	Mira Levy	672	16.2	+3.2
Green	Debra Green	276	6.6	−0.4
Green	Jane Lithgow	156	3.8	N/A
Turnout		4,154	39.2	+6.9
Conservative hold		Swing		
Conservative hold		Swing		
Conservative hold		Swing		

=== Finchley Church End ===
Finchley Church End (3 seats)
Party	Candidate	Votes	%	±%
Conservative	Eva Greenspan*	2,604	63.4	+4.7
Conservative	Mike Freer*	2,543	61.9	+7.5
Conservative	Dan Thomas	2,402	58.5	+2.0
Labour	Michael Walsh	756	18.4	−7.3
Labour	Brian Watkins	702	17.1	−8.3
Labour	Alan Paun	691	16.8	−8.0
Green	Miranda Dunn	567	13.8	+2.9
Liberal Democrats	Malcolm Davis	526	12.8	+2.1
Liberal Democrats	James Graham	508	12.4	+2.9
Liberal Democrats	Ingeborg Graber	435	10.6	+1.5
Turnout		4,106	42.8	+8.5
Conservative hold		Swing		
Conservative hold		Swing		
Conservative hold		Swing		

=== Garden Suburb ===
Garden Suburb (3 seats)
Party	Candidate	Votes	%	±%
Conservative	John Marshall*	2,418	53.6	−2.4
Conservative	Andrew Harper*	2,307	51.1	+3.8
Conservative	Jazmin Naghar*	2,158	47.8	+2.9
Liberal Democrats	Marjorie Harris	1,701	37.7	+4.5
Liberal Democrats	Peter Lusher	1,425	31.6	−0.2
Liberal Democrats	Stephen Barber	1,395	30.9	+3.1
Labour	Kenneth Murrell	462	10.2	−3.4
Labour	Janet Solomons	459	10.2	−0.6
Green	Andrew Farrer	411	9.1	+1.4
Labour	Diarmaid Ward	325	7.2	−3.0
Turnout		4,512	46.3	+7.5
Conservative hold		Swing		
Conservative hold		Swing		
Conservative hold		Swing		

=== Golders Green ===
Golders Green (3 seats)
Party	Candidate	Votes	%	±%
Conservative	Melvin Cohen*	2,134	59.5	+0.1
Conservative	Christopher Harris*	2,095	58.4	+2.9
Conservative	Dean Cohen	2,090	58.2	−1.0
Labour	Aubrey Ross	690	19.2	−8.7
Labour	Anthony Boulton	588	16.4	−9.6
Labour	Mary McGuirk	555	15.5	−9.0
Liberal Democrats	Pauline McKinnell	415	11.6	+3.2
Liberal Democrats	Jonathan Davies	401	11.2	+3.4
Independent	Dorothy Badrick	389	10.8	N/A
Liberal Democrats	Simon Kovar	344	9.6	+2.3
Green	Dolores Incenzo	329	9.2	+2.9
Turnout		3,589	36.7	−0.7
Conservative hold		Swing		
Conservative hold		Swing		
Conservative hold		Swing		

=== Hale ===
Hale (3 seats)
Party	Candidate	Votes	%	±%
Conservative	Brian Gordon*	2,315	47.4	+4.7
Conservative	Jane Ellison	2,276	46.6	+8.2
Conservative	Hugh Rayner	2,099	43.0	+5.1
Labour	Sandi Balendra	1,820	37.3	−6.7
Labour	Steven Blomer*	1,799	36.9	−7.7
Labour	Adam Dustagheer	1,749	35.8	−4.0
Liberal Democrats	Sheila Gottsche	528	10.8	+0.5
Liberal Democrats	Geoffrey Jacobs	523	10.7	+0.1
Liberal Democrats	Michael Roberts	488	10.0	+0.3
Green	David Lake	359	7.4	+1.3
Turnout		4,881	45.8	+9.3
Conservative hold		Swing		
Conservative gain from Labour		Swing		
Conservative gain from Labour		Swing		

=== Hendon ===
Hendon (3 seats)
Party	Candidate	Votes	%	±%
Conservative	Anthony Finn*	2,011	55.3	+10.2
Conservative	Maureen Braun*	1,937	53.3	+11.0
Conservative	Matthew Offord*	1,914	52.6	+14.5
Liberal Democrats	Peter Greenhill	855	23.5	−8.3
Liberal Democrats	Stieve De Lance	793	21.8	−8.9
Liberal Democrats	Honora Morrissey	749	20.6	−8.8
Labour	Pierre Jeanmarie	641	17.6	−5.8
Labour	Ruth Montague	594	16.3	−2.6
Labour	Nitin Parekh	538	14.8	−3.9
Green	Pablo De Mello	271	7.5	+1.6
Turnout		3,636	34.6	+4.1
Conservative hold		Swing		
Conservative hold		Swing		
Conservative hold		Swing		

=== High Barnet ===
High Barnet (3 seats)
Party	Candidate	Votes	%	±%
Conservative	Yvonne Prentice*	2,356	45.1	−9.8
Conservative	Bridget Perry	2,335	44.7	−7.8
Liberal Democrats	Duncan Macdonald*	2,226	42.6	+30.5
Liberal Democrats	Matthew Harris	2,187	41.9	+28.4
Conservative	Stephen Sowerby	2,160	41.4	−7.7
Liberal Democrats	David Nowell	2,033	38.9	+24.6
Green	Robert Miles	484	9.3	−2.5
Labour	Elizabeth Jarvis	483	9.3	−16.7
Labour	Michael Larcey	396	7.6	−15.9
Labour	Richard Soer	365	7.0	−16.1
Victory United	Barbara Yeboah-Hinton	71	1.4	N/A
Turnout		5,220	50.0	+12.4
Conservative hold		Swing		
Conservative hold		Swing		
Liberal Democrats gain from Conservative		Swing		

=== Mill Hill ===
Mill Hill (3 seats)
Party	Candidate	Votes	%	±%
Liberal Democrats	Wayne Casey*	2,108	43.4	−16.8
Liberal Democrats	Jeremy Davies*	2,082	42.9	−15.0
Conservative	John Hart	1,964	40.5	+13.8
Conservative	Matthew Dreisin	1,923	39.6	+13.4
Conservative	Richard Millett	1,909	39.3	+15.6
Liberal Democrats	Sean Hooker*	1,749	36.0	−15.6
Labour	Will Parnaby	600	12.4	+1.0
Labour	Agnes Macauley	587	12.1	+0.9
Labour	Daniel Mbala-Appoh	487	10.0	−0.9
Green	David Williams	472	9.7	+3.4
Turnout		4,855	44.4	+8.4
Liberal Democrats hold		Swing		
Liberal Democrats hold		Swing		
Conservative gain from Liberal Democrats		Swing		

=== Oakleigh ===
Oakleigh (3 seats)
Party	Candidate	Votes	%	±%
Conservative	Brian Salinger*	2,509	52.1	+3.2
Conservative	Marina Yannakoudakis	2,447	50.8	+2.7
Conservative	Sachin Rajput	2,349	48.8	+1.5
Liberal Democrats	David Barton	1,371	28.5	+13.9
Liberal Democrats	Bruce Standing	1,330	27.6	+13.9
Liberal Democrats	David Keech	1,321	27.4	+15.6
Labour	Pamela Bradbury	641	13.3	−18.6
Labour	Susan Russell	621	12.9	−18.4
Green	Richard Cutting	550	11.4	+2.7
Labour	Valerie Tyas	524	10.9	−20.0
Turnout		4,813	44.7	+10.9
Conservative hold		Swing		
Conservative hold		Swing		
Conservative hold		Swing		

=== Totteridge ===
Totteridge (3 seats)
Party	Candidate	Votes	%	±%
Conservative	Richard Cornelius	2,464	57.7	−2.4
Conservative	Brian Coleman*	2,461	57.7	−3.1
Conservative	Caroline Margo	2,304	54.0	−4.8
Independent	Robert Mcdougall	959	22.5	N/A
Liberal Democrats	Anna Cardow	695	16.3	+2.2
Green	Andrew Newby	687	16.1	+5.7
Liberal Democrats	Michael Cole	627	14.7	+1.9
Labour	Janet Fitzsimmons	600	14.1	−7.6
Labour	Frederick Jarvis	561	13.1	−6.8
Labour	David Smuts	509	11.9	−5.7
Turnout		4,267	42.5	+8.2
Conservative hold		Swing		
Conservative hold		Swing		
Conservative hold		Swing		

=== Underhill ===
Underhill (3 seats)
Party	Candidate	Votes	%	±%
Labour	Anita Campbell*	2,141	42.3	−0.7
Conservative	Fiona Bulmer*	2,104	41.6	−3.0
Conservative	Daniel Webb	2,009	39.7	−2.9
Conservative	Daniel Hope	2,003	39.6	−1.4
Labour	Gordon Massey	1,980	39.1	−1.2
Labour	Timothy Roberts	1,936	38.3	+1.4
Liberal Democrats	Dennis Bird	729	14.4	+5.4
Liberal Democrats	Yvonne Wicksteed	605	12.0	+3.5
Liberal Democrats	Eileen Umbo	548	10.8	+2.5
Green	Timothy Riley	489	9.7	+2.1
Turnout		5,058	48.5	+10.3
Labour hold		Swing		
Conservative hold		Swing		
Conservative hold		Swing		

=== West Finchley ===
West Finchley (3 seats)
Party	Candidate	Votes	%	±%
Labour	Ross Houston	1,799	41.7	−5.9
Labour	James Tierney*	1,717	39.8	−6.2
Labour	Kath McGuirk*	1,667	38.6	−8.4
Conservative	Richard Ableson	1,618	37.5	+4.8
Conservative	Peter Wilding	1,603	37.1	+5.6
Conservative	Gareth Knight	1,587	36.7	+7.6
Green	Michael Gee	649	15.0	+3.1
Liberal Democrats	Malcolm Blount	602	13.9	+1.8
Liberal Democrats	Janice Turner	575	13.3	±0.0
Liberal Democrats	Prem Pawar	537	12.4	+0.9
Turnout		4,319	44.7	+9.2
Labour hold		Swing		
Labour hold		Swing		
Labour hold		Swing		

=== West Hendon ===
West Hendon (3 seats)
Party	Candidate	Votes	%	±%
Labour	Julie Johnson	1,694	47.1	−4.8
Labour	Agnes Slocombe*	1,616	45.0	−5.2
Labour	Ansuya Sodha*	1,555	43.3	−2.7
Conservative	Elliot Arwas	1,205	33.5	+1.5
Conservative	Margaret Stevens	1,119	31.1	+1.1
Conservative	Vinay Sharma	1,059	29.5	+1.1
Liberal Democrats	Harry Levy	509	14.2	+1.7
Liberal Democrats	Michael Foley	449	12.5	+1.9
Green	Jasmine Lawrence	400	11.1	+3.8
Liberal Democrats	Victoria Rosoux	367	10.2	+0.1
Turnout		3,595	35.5	+6.5
Labour hold		Swing		
Labour hold		Swing		
Labour hold		Swing		

=== Woodhouse ===
Woodhouse (3 seats)
Party	Candidate	Votes	%	±%
Labour	Geoffrey Cooke	2,081	43.6	−3.2
Labour	Anne Hutton*	2,061	43.2	−4.0
Labour	Alan Schneiderman*	1,856	38.9	−2.6
Conservative	Stefan Kerner	1,728	36.2	+0.3
Conservative	Christopher Bird	1,698	35.6	−0.3
Conservative	Reuben Thompstone	1,662	34.9	±0.0
Liberal Democrats	Ian Murphy	714	15.0	+3.1
Green	Edelgard Vaswani	660	13.8	+3.4
Liberal Democrats	Rita Landeryou	624	13.1	+3.2
Liberal Democrats	John Sutcliffe	513	10.8	+0.7
Turnout		4,768	45.3	+9.0
Labour hold		Swing		
Labour hold		Swing		
Labour hold		Swing		

== By-elections between 2006 and 2010 ==
=== East Barnet ===
East Barnet by-election, 8 February 2007
Party	Candidate	Votes	%	±%
Conservative	Joanna Tambourides	1,666	49.1	
Labour	Pauline Webb	1,025	30.2	
Liberal Democrats	Sean Hooker	552	16.2	
Green	Howard Javes	147	4.3	
Majority		641	18.9	
Turnout		3,390	30.5	
Conservative hold		Swing		

Cllr Olwen Evans died on 25 December 2006 after a long battle with cancer. She had served East Barnet Ward as a councillor for 24 years (1978-1994 and 1998–2006).

=== Hale ===
Hale by-election, 1 May 2008
Party	Candidate	Votes	%	±%
Conservative	Tom Davey	2,798	50.1	+4.0
Labour	Alex Brodkin	1,882	33.7	−2.5
Liberal Democrats	Geoffrey Jacobs	487	8.7	−1.8
BNP	Stephen Curry	213	3.8	+3.8
Green	Andrew Newby	206	3.7	−3.4
Majority		916	16.4	
Turnout		5,586		
Conservative hold		Swing		

The by-election was called following the resignation of Cllr Jane Ellison.

=== Edgware ===
Edgware by-election, 4 June 2009
Party	Candidate	Votes	%	±%
Conservative	Darrel Yawitch	2,953	63.1	+13.7
Labour	Alan Or-Bach	1,036	22.2	−1.9
Liberal Democrats	Jonathan Davies	688	14.7	−5.6
Majority		1,917	40.9	
Turnout		4,677		
Conservative hold		Swing		

The by-election was called following the resignation of Cllr Richard Weider.

=== Totteridge ===
Totteridge by-election, 4 June 2009
Party	Candidate	Votes	%	±%
Conservative	Alison Cornelius	2,837	65.5	+20.0
Liberal Democrats	Jonty Stern	792	18.3	+5.4
Labour	Tim Roberts	699	16.2	+5.0
Majority		2,045	47.2	
Turnout		4,328		
Conservative hold		Swing		

The by-election was called following the resignation of Cllr Caroline Margo.
