= 1986 Barnet London Borough Council election =

1986 local election in England

- 8 May 1986

All 60 seats to Barnet London Borough Council 31 seats needed for a majority
- Turnout: 42.0%

	First party	Second party	Third party
Party	Conservative	Labour	Alliance
Seats won	39	18	3
Seat change	▼9	▲6	▲3
Percentage	44.0%	30.9%	22.9%
- Map of the results of the 1986 Barnet London Borough council election. Conservatives in blue, Labour in red, Alliance in yellow
Council control before election
Conservative
Council control after election
Conservative

The 1986 Barnet Council election took place on 8 May 1986 to elect members of Barnet London Borough Council in London, England. The whole council was up for election and the Conservative party stayed in overall control of the council.

== Election result ==
Overall turnout in the election was 42.0%.

Barnet local election result 1986
Party	Seats	Gains	Losses	Net gain/loss	Seats %	Votes %	Votes	+/−
Conservative	39	0	9	-9		43.4		
Labour	18	6	0	+6		30.5		
Alliance	3	3	0	+3		22.6		

== Ward results ==
=== Arkley ===
Arkley (3 seats)
Party	Candidate	Votes	%	±%
Conservative	Ian Balcombe	2,090		
Conservative	Wilfred Lipman	2,071		
Conservative	Leah Hertz	1,949		
Alliance	David Keech	1,836		
Labour	Anita Campbell	1,655		
Labour	Keith Livingston	1,638		
Labour	Pauline Green	1,631		
Alliance	Robert Eccles	1,622		
Alliance	David Raff	1,445		
Ratepayers and Residents	Erich Herrmann	710		
Greens	Stephen Syme	265		
Turnout				
Conservative hold		Swing		
Conservative hold		Swing		
Conservative hold		Swing		

=== Brunswick Park ===
Brunswick Park (3 seats)
Party	Candidate	Votes	%	±%
Conservative	Donald Goodman	2,355		
Conservative	John Rawles	2,226		
Conservative	Irene Palmer	2,223		
Labour	Jeffrey Leifer	957		
Labour	Bridget Wilkinson	893		
Alliance	Leslie Kealey	876		
Labour	Peter Wilkinson	865		
Alliance	Peter Watkins	833		
Alliance	John Woods	812		
Turnout				
Conservative hold		Swing		
Conservative hold		Swing		
Conservative hold		Swing		

=== Burnt Oak ===
Burnt Oak (3 seats)
Party	Candidate	Votes	%	±%
Labour	Peter Ellis	2,043		
Labour	Alan Williams	1,963		
Labour	Gerald Shamash	1,849		
Ind Lab	James Brophy	1,082		
Conservative	Peter Edwards	774		
Conservative	Oliver Stone	705		
Conservative	Julian Czarny	649		
Ind Lab	John Heritage	516		
Ind Lab	Richards Hankins	476		
Alliance	Albert Dean	356		
Alliance	Hilda Munden	354		
Alliance	Ian Albert	347		
Turnout				
Labour hold		Swing		
Labour hold		Swing		
Labour hold		Swing		

=== Childs Hill ===
Childs Hill (3 seats)
Party	Candidate	Votes	%	±%
Alliance	Monroe Palmer	1,740		
Alliance	Brian Stone	1,517		
Alliance	Jack Cohen	1,491		
Conservative	Daniel Cohen	1,431		
Conservative	Leonard Isaac	1,350		
Conservative	Michele Moulin	1,347		
Labour	Christopher Brennan	1,125		
Labour	Peter Grimes	1,143		
Labour	Jacqueline Stuffling-Holland	1,042		
Turnout				
Alliance gain from Conservative		Swing		
Alliance gain from Conservative		Swing		
Alliance gain from Conservative		Swing		

=== Colindale ===
Colindale (3 seats)
Party	Candidate	Votes	%	±%
Labour	Thomas McKendry	1,773		
Labour	Ellis Hillman	1,736		
Labour	Jenny Manson	1,679		
Conservative	Maxton Brooker	1,138		
Conservative	William Nicholson	1,055		
Conservative	Sylvia Da Costa	1,022		
Alliance	Ruth Cohen	940		
Alliance	Elisabeth Bristow	830		
Alliance	Vivien Topping	724		
Ind Lab	Eyo Nkune	371		
Turnout				
Labour hold		Swing		
Labour hold		Swing		
Labour hold		Swing		

=== East Barnet ===
East Barnet (3 seats)
Party	Candidate	Votes	%	±%
Conservative	John Perry	2,023		
Conservative	Olwen Evans	1,981		
Conservative	Mary Perry	1,933		
Alliance	Colin Shaw	1,172		
Labour	Carmel Bedford	1,151		
Alliance	George Gomez	1,133		
Alliance	Elizabeth Nesbitt	1,102		
Labour	Michael Larcey	1,064		
Labour	Usha Chopra	994		
Turnout				
Conservative hold		Swing		
Conservative hold		Swing		
Conservative hold		Swing		

=== East Finchley ===
East Finchley (3 seats)
Party	Candidate	Votes	%	±%
Labour	Laurence Spigel	3,063		
Labour	John Davies	3,019		
Labour	Frances Crook	2,963		
Conservative	Michael Buck	1,618		
Conservative	Kathryn Evans	1,531		
Conservative	Mohammed Khamisa	1,473		
Alliance	Michael Cole	683		
Alliance	Bernard Cragg	671		
Alliance	Jonathan Summers	621		
Turnout				
Labour hold		Swing		
Labour hold		Swing		
Labour hold		Swing		

=== Edgware ===
Edgware (3 seats)
Party	Candidate	Votes	%	±%
Conservative	David Hammond	2,126		
Conservative	Malcolm Lester	2,073		
Conservative	Archibald Smith	2,044		
Labour	Geoffrey Paull	765		
Labour	Keith Hurcombe	762		
Labour	Robert Vaughan	742		
Alliance	Barbara Farbey	646		
Alliance	Jonathan Mulberg	635		
Alliance	Dennis Schulster	630		
Turnout				
Conservative hold		Swing		
Conservative hold		Swing		
Conservative hold		Swing		

=== Finchley ===
Finchley (3 seats)
Party	Candidate	Votes	%	±%
Conservative	Leslie Sussman	2,284		
Conservative	Miles Golding	2,224		
Conservative	Barbara Langstone	2,203		
Labour	Kenneth Little	1,195		
Labour	Brian Watkins	1,170		
Labour	Jeffrey McCracken-Hewson	1,162		
Alliance	Anne Cragg	701		
Alliance	Malcolm Davis	687		
Alliance	Willi Kenton	650		
Greens	Roy Bowden	187		
Greens	Ian Vickers	151		
Greens	Christopher Tasker	140		
Humanist	Judith Earley	43		
Turnout				
Conservative hold		Swing		
Conservative hold		Swing		
Conservative hold		Swing		

=== Friern Barnet ===
Friern Barnet (3 seats)
Party	Candidate	Votes	%	±%
Conservative	John Tiplady	2,318		
Conservative	Brian Salinger	2,309		
Conservative	Christopher Platford	2,272		
Labour	Hilary Delyon	1,208		
Labour	Mary Nutkins	1,202		
Labour	Roger Matthews	1,193		
Alliance	Nicholas Harvey	1,129		
Alliance	Andrew Wade	1,090		
Alliance	David Litherland	1,053		
Turnout				
Conservative hold		Swing		
Conservative hold		Swing		
Conservative hold		Swing		

=== Garden Suburb ===
Garden Suburb (3 seats)
Party	Candidate	Votes	%	±%
Conservative	Clement Halfon	2,348		
Conservative	Malcolm Davis	2,320		
Conservative	Roy Schutz	2,388		
Alliance	Viola Haire	1,493		
Alliance	Peter Lusher	1,470		
Alliance	Joan Beales	1,438		
Labour	Rita Brent	623		
Labour	Andrew Redpath	606		
Labour	Adam Gaines	558		
Greens	Janet Strangeways	287		
Turnout				
Conservative hold		Swing		
Conservative hold		Swing		
Conservative hold		Swing		

=== Golders Green ===
Golders Green (3 seats)
Party	Candidate	Votes	%	±%
Conservative	Melvin Cohen	1,797		
Conservative	Leslie Foster	1,727		
Conservative	Joseph Hunter	1,611		
Labour	Montague Miller	1,194		
Labour	John Pearson	1,121		
Labour	Edward Pointon	1,104		
Alliance	Linda Craig	757		
Alliance	Mira Levy	737		
Alliance	Louis Lawrence	688		
Turnout				
Conservative hold		Swing		
Conservative hold		Swing		
Conservative hold		Swing		

=== Hadley ===
Hadley (3 seats)
Party	Candidate	Votes	%	±%
Conservative	Herbert Hoyle	2,735		
Conservative	Carol Cender	2,709		
Conservative	Beverley Lane	2,676		
Alliance	Rosemary Watkins	1,737		
Alliance	Stuart Brown	1,705		
Alliance	Geoffrey Fallows	1,697		
Labour	John Bacon	1,028		
Labour	Michael Campbell	1,021		
Labour	John Holloway	976		
Turnout				
Conservative hold		Swing		
Conservative hold		Swing		
Conservative hold		Swing		

=== Hale ===
Hale (3 seats)
Party	Candidate	Votes	%	±%
Conservative	Leslie Pym	2,119		
Conservative	Dorothy Benson	2,084		
Conservative	Jack Clarfelt	1,998		
Alliance	Diana Pattison	1,192		
Alliance	John Kay	1,154		
Alliance	Quintin Iwi	1,100		
Labour	Elaine Runswick	803		
Labour	David Suiter	742		
Labour	Jeanie Tait	740		
Turnout				
Conservative hold		Swing		
Conservative hold		Swing		
Conservative hold		Swing		

=== Hendon ===
Hendon (3 seats)
Party	Candidate	Votes	%	±%
Conservative	Norman Hirshfield	1,932		
Conservative	Peter Grosz	1,804		
Conservative	Frederick Poole	1,749		
Labour	Barbara Condon	1,172		
Labour	Martin Earl	1,151		
Alliance	Douglas Baron	1,140		
Alliance	Alan Magnus	1,127		
Labour	Bryan Reith	1,065		
Alliance	David Warner	1,024		
Turnout				
Conservative hold		Swing		
Conservative hold		Swing		
Conservative hold		Swing		

=== Mill Hill ===
Mill Hill (3 seats)
Party	Candidate	Votes	%	±%
Conservative	John Hart	2,389		
Conservative	Denis Dippel	2,377		
Conservative	Anthony Antoniou	2,248		
Alliance	Terry Rollinson	1,058		
Alliance	Alan Wilkinson	1,040		
Labour	Adrienne Van Loen	934		
Alliance	Philip Tobin	922		
Labour	Ian Parker	905		
Labour	Malcolm Perez	839		
Turnout				
Conservative hold		Swing		
Conservative hold		Swing		
Conservative hold		Swing		

=== St Paul's ===
St Paul’s (3 seats)
Party	Candidate	Votes	%	±%
Labour	Michael Freeman	2,053		
Labour	Narendrakumar Dave	1,985		
Labour	Catherine Lyons	1,914		
Conservative	Gordon Bettis	1,828		
Conservative	Edna James	1,626		
Conservative	Mary Phillips	1,611		
Ind Con	John Fitzgibbon	722		
Alliance	Stephen Landau	712		
Alliance	Robert Stone	687		
Alliance	Leonard Watkins	675		
Greens	Anne Fealdman	230		
Greens	Maureen Colmans	210		
Greens	John Colmans	203		
Ind Con	Thomas Quinn	167		
Ind Con	Maria Pavlides	146		
Turnout				
Labour gain from Conservative		Swing		
Labour gain from Conservative		Swing		
Labour gain from Conservative		Swing		

=== Totteridge ===
Totteridge (3 seats)
Party	Candidate	Votes	%	±%
Conservative	Victor Usher	2,526		
Conservative	Victor Lyon	2,501		
Conservative	Cecile Levinson	2,479		
Alliance	Richard Bevan	991		
Alliance	Edith Gardner	968		
Alliance	Alan Brown	938		
Labour	Joel Hirsch	877		
Labour	Pete Sutton	850		
Labour	Yanna Manolas	843		
Turnout				
Conservative hold		Swing		
Conservative hold		Swing		
Conservative hold		Swing		

=== West Hendon ===
West Hendon (3 seats)
Party	Candidate	Votes	%	±%
Labour	Timothy Sims	1,965		
Labour	Doreen Neall	1,964		
Labour	Agnes Slocombe	1,835		
Conservative	Anthony Finn	1,677		
Conservative	Jayendra Patel	1,622		
Conservative	Carole Ovenden	1,539		
Alliance	Harry Levy	639		
Alliance	Daniel Finkelstein	617		
Alliance	George Allen	562		
Turnout				
Labour hold		Swing		
Labour hold		Swing		
Labour hold		Swing		

=== Woodhouse ===
Woodhouse (3 seats)
Party	Candidate	Votes	%	±%
Labour	Michael Harris	2,170		
Labour	Dennis Reed	2,056		
Labour	Rudolf Vis	1,973		
Conservative	Gillian Bull	1,939		
Conservative	Graham Halliday	1,877		
Conservative	Philip Williams	1,851		
Alliance	Gerard Fitzgerald	1,110		
Alliance	Dagmar Saxl	1,062		
Alliance	Albert Wright	984		
Labour gain from Conservative		Swing		
Labour gain from Conservative		Swing		
Labour gain from Conservative		Swing		

== By-elections between 1986 and 1990 ==
=== Hadley ===
Hadley by-election, 20 November 1986
Party	Candidate	Votes	%	±%
Conservative	Gillian M. Bull	2,006		
Alliance	Rosemary M. Watkins	1,224		
Labour	Keith E. Livingstone	662		
Ind. Conservative	John P. Fitzgibbon	97		
Turnout			30.07	
Conservative hold		Swing		

The by-election was called following the resignation of Cllr. Beverley G. Lane.

=== Garden Suburb ===
Garden Suburb by-election, 27 November 1986
Party	Candidate	Votes	%	±%
Conservative	Coral Sebag-Montefiore	1,415		
Alliance	Peter D. Falk	1,243		
Labour	Rita Brent	327		
Turnout			27.97	
Conservative hold		Swing		

The by-election was called following the resignation of Cllr. Clement Halfon.

=== Arkley ===
Arkley by-election, 10 November 1988
Party	Candidate	Votes	%	±%
Conservative	Arthur A. Beck	1,462		
Labour	Kevin W. Smith	1,075		
Liberal Democrats	Michael A. Cleal	833		
Independent	Philip W. Groves	214		
Green	Simon A. Clarke	166		
Turnout			29.66	
Conservative hold		Swing		

The by-election was called following the death of Cllr. Leah Hertz.

=== Garden Suburb ===
Garden Suburb by-election, 10 November 1988
Party	Candidate	Votes	%	±%
Conservative	Veronica C. Soskin	1,503		
Liberal Democrats	Michael S. Pickering	1,258		
Labour	Penelope Grant	306		
Turnout			28.94	
Conservative hold		Swing		

The by-election was called following the resignation of Cllr. Coral Sebag-Montefiore.

=== Arkley ===
Arkley by-election, 9 March 1989
Party	Candidate	Votes	%	±%
Conservative	Philip H. Williams	1,468		
Labour	Keith E. Livingstone	1,094		
Lib Dem Focus Team	Michael A. CIeal	809		
Independent	Philip W. Groves	207		
Turnout			29.12	
Conservative hold		Swing		

The by-election was called following the death of Cllr. Wilfred Lipman.
