= 1968 Barnet London Borough Council election =

1968 local election in England

← 1964	9 May 1968	1971 →

All 60 seats to Barnet London Borough Council 31 seats needed for a majority
- Turnout: 40.8%

	First party	Second party	Third party
Party	Conservative	Labour	Liberal
Seats won	56	3	1
Percentage	62.5%	17.0%	20.3%
Council control before election
Conservative
Council control after election
Conservative

The 1968 Barnet Council election took place on 9 May 1968 to elect members of Barnet London Borough Council in London, England. The whole council was up for election and the Conservative Party stayed in overall control of the council. There were 60 seats divided into 20 wards of 3 seats each. The Conservatives won 56 seats, Labour 3 and the Liberals 1. There were also 5 aldermen, all of whom were Conservatives. The first election to Barnet Council was in 1964, and it acted as a shadow council until the London Borough of Barnet was established in 1965. No comparisons are possible between the 1964 and 1968 elections due to changes in the boundaries and the total number of councillors.

== Election result ==
Overall turnout in the election was 40.8%.

Barnet local election result 1968
Party	Seats	Gains	Losses	Net gain/loss	Seats %	Votes %	Votes	+/−
Conservative	56				93.3	62.5		
Labour	3				5.0	17.0		
Liberal	1				1.7	20.3		

== Ward results ==
=== Arkley ===
Arkley
Party	Candidate	Votes	%	±%
Conservative	P. G. H. Woodruff	2,794	66.6	
Conservative	H. R. Stewart	2,726		
Conservative	D. R. Dover	2,636		
Labour	J. C. Stevenson	1,153	25.4	
Labour	R. H. Mann	983		
Labour	K. Horrrocks	971		
Liberal	B. C. Davies	344	8.0	
Liberal	A. A. Davies	320		
Liberal	M. B. Davis	318		
Turnout			42.9	
Conservative win (new seat)				
Conservative win (new seat)				
Conservative win (new seat)				

=== Brunswick Park ===
Brunswick Park
Party	Candidate	Votes	%	±%
Conservative	J. L. Amor	3,301	69.4	
Conservative	J. S. Payne	3,274		
Conservative	A. C. Seaton	3,243		
Liberal	E. L. Knight	974	19.8	
Liberal	K. J. Fowler	960		
Liberal	G. T. Olding	862		
Labour	Mrs F. E. Stone	531	10.8	
Labour	B. S. Warman	501		
Labour	D. S. W. Watts	499		
Turnout			46.7	
Conservative win (new seat)				
Conservative win (new seat)				
Conservative win (new seat)				

=== Burnt Oak ===
Burnt Oak
Party	Candidate	Votes	%	±%
Labour	J. S. Champion	1,671	60.8	
Labour	F. J. Collinson	1,561		
Labour	R. Robinson	1,488		
Conservative	R. F. K. Harris	876	32.8	
Conservative	L. J. Pym	865		
Conservative	C. Turbutt	804		
Liberal	D. T. Baron	217	6.4	
Liberal	A. J. Post	143		
Liberal	Mrs R. Simmons	140		
Turnout			28.2	
Labour win (new seat)				
Labour win (new seat)				
Labour win (new seat)				

=== Childs Hill ===
Childs Hill
Party	Candidate	Votes	%	±%
Conservative	R. J. Finnigan	2,434	61.0	
Conservative	K. W. Hughes	2,396		
Conservative	N. R. Sutton	2,385		
Liberal	A. B. L. Gower	847	21.0	
Liberal	M. E. Palmer	825		
Liberal	Mrs J. D. Caine	809		
Labour	N. Kesselman	735	18.0	
Labour	B. L. Powell	713		
Labour	J. D. Roith	675		
Turnout			35.9	
Conservative win (new seat)				
Conservative win (new seat)				
Conservative win (new seat)				

=== Colindale ===
Colindale
Party	Candidate	Votes	%	±%
Conservative	G. F. Allen	1,375	50.1	
Conservative	Mrs M. P. Bowman	1,341		
Conservative	M. Foux	1,309		
Labour	B. E. McCormack	1,079	37.2	
Labour	F. L. Tyler	968		
Labour	L. Marks	941		
Liberal	B. S. Wrigley	396	12.7	
Liberal	J. F. Hearn	318		
Liberal	F. Alberg	306		
Turnout			43.3	
Conservative win (new seat)				
Conservative win (new seat)				
Conservative win (new seat)				

=== East Barnet ===
East Barnet
Party	Candidate	Votes	%	±%
Conservative	A. Pares	3,170	65.4	
Conservative	J. E. Park	3,133		
Conservative	Mrs M. L. Slack	3,081		
Labour	W. Seagroatt	1,160	23.6	
Labour	G. A. J. Gunning	1,142		
Labour	Mrs J. E. Pudney	1,079		
Liberal	S. W. F. Stockwell	497	10.2	
Liberal	Mrs J. R. Mason	494		
Liberal	D. L. Ward	478		
Communist	R. Falber	105		
Turnout			45.4	
Conservative win (new seat)				
Conservative win (new seat)				
Conservative win (new seat)				

=== East Finchley ===
East Finchley
Party	Candidate	Votes	%	±%
Conservative	C. W. Wilds	1,860	43.2	
Conservative	I. A. Deslandes	1,831		
Liberal	J. Webb	1,821	37.5	
Conservative	Mrs T. Z. Barnes	1,734		
Liberal	N. E. Whenmouth	1,470		
Liberal	Mrs G. B. L. Cohen	1,418		
Labour	M. J. O'Connor	804	18.2	
Labour	B. E. Elliott	747		
Labour	T. A. McKendry	729		
Communist	A. B. Beyer	145	1.2	
Turnout			38.1	
Conservative win (new seat)				
Conservative win (new seat)				
Liberal win (new seat)				

=== Edgware ===
Edgware
Party	Candidate	Votes	%	±%
Conservative	J. D. Apthorp	2,765	66.7	
Conservative	H. R. Brooks	2,747		
Conservative	A. T. W. Smith	2,663		
Liberal	A. D. Manning	933	21.4	
Liberal	Mrs M. R. A. Billenness	869		
Liberal	R. A. Blake	822		
Labour	Miss M. Schwarz	498	11.9	
Labour	B. A. Fireman	489		
Labour	R. Pyburn	477		
Turnout			40.2	
Conservative win (new seat)				
Conservative win (new seat)				
Conservative win (new seat)				

=== Finchley ===
Finchley
Party	Candidate	Votes	%	±%
Conservative	L. Sussman	2,522	55.8	
Conservative	Mrs E. R. Gibson	2,509		
Conservative	M. Golding	2,473		
Liberal	F. Davis	1,671	35.8	
Liberal	L. Sattin	1,604		
Liberal	N. Barron	1,538		
Labour	I. N. G. Selwyn	383	8.4	
Labour	M. D. Johnson	378		
Labour	Mrs O. G. Deaner	369		
Turnout			40.7	
Conservative win (new seat)				
Conservative win (new seat)				
Conservative win (new seat)				

=== Friern Barnet ===
Friern Barnet
Party	Candidate	Votes	%	±%
Conservative	Mrs E. Constable	3,093	78.3	
Conservative	W. H. Tangye	2,984		
Conservative	W. L. Pearson	2,865		
Liberal	K. E. Ruge	529	12.1	
Liberal	D. S. Duncombe	436		
Liberal	Mrs J. L. A. Veats	422		
Labour	J. C. D'V Roberts	384	9.6	
Labour	T. E. Parker	362		
Labour	Miss A. M. Wright	347		
Turnout			38.0	
Conservative win (new seat)				
Conservative win (new seat)				
Conservative win (new seat)				

=== Garden Suburb ===
Garden Suburb
Party	Candidate	Votes	%	±%
Conservative	F. A. Sharman	2,927	55.3	
Conservative	J. J. Fischer	2,921		
Conservative	A. C. D. Miller	2,895		
Liberal	Q. J. Iwi	1,897	34.7	
Liberal	A. H. Tibber	1,837		
Liberal	Mrs G. M. Skutsch	1,748		
Labour	Mrs B. R. Scharf	527	9.1	
Labour	P. P. Moiret	471		
Labour	D. E. De Saxe	436		
Communist	J. W. Pinder	156	1.0	
Turnout			47.8	
Conservative win (new seat)				
Conservative win (new seat)				
Conservative win (new seat)				

=== Golders Green ===
Golders Green
Party	Candidate	Votes	%	±%
Conservative	Mrs R. A. Freedman	2,218	51.2	
Conservative	C. F. Harris	2,188		
Conservative	G. J. Dickins	2,176		
Liberal	S. Brass	1,255	27.9	
Liberal	P. H. Robin	1,175		
Liberal	V. J. Rosoux	1,152		
Labour	T. H. Barnes	944	20.2	
Labour	R. Balcomb	830		
Labour	L. W. Cole	819		
Communist	A. L. Wilcocks	99	0.8	
Turnout			38.7	
Conservative win (new seat)				
Conservative win (new seat)				
Conservative win (new seat)				

=== Hadley ===
Hadley
Party	Candidate	Votes	%	±%
Conservative	E. A. E. Asker	3,678	65.8	
Conservative	G. H. Jobbins	3,634		
Conservative	Mrs M. M. Symons	3,558		
Liberal	A. J. Freake	1,192	21.1	
Liberal	Mrs E. M. Liddal	1,181		
Liberal	H. V. Tibbles	1,112		
Labour	J. M. Newman	754	13.1	
Labour	C. J. Grammer	724		
Labour	R. H. Potter	689		
Turnout			46.1	
Conservative win (new seat)				
Conservative win (new seat)				
Conservative win (new seat)				

=== Hale ===
Hale
Party	Candidate	Votes	%	±%
Conservative	A. G. Risdon	3,283	68.8	
Conservative	Mrs C. Riordan	3,266		
Conservative	D. F. Simons	2,781		
Liberal	B. A. Simmons	1,044	15.3	
Labour	Mrs G. McClelland	738	15.9	
Labour	A. R. McNidder	714		
Labour	M. S. Cohen	697		
Liberal	Mrs D. C. Pattison	518		
Liberal	S. Lawson	517		
Turnout			43.6	
Conservative win (new seat)				
Conservative win (new seat)				
Conservative win (new seat)				

=== Hendon ===
Hendon
Party	Candidate	Votes	%	±%
Conservative	J. D. Gordon-Lee	3,078	57.0	
Conservative	N. E. Hirshfield	3,035		
Conservative	V. S. Hockley	2,986		
Liberal	Mrs A. S. Godfrey	1,682	31.1	
Liberal	Peter Hasler Billenness	1,644		
Liberal	D. B. Griffiths	1,644		
Labour	Mrs H. Fleet	669	11.9	
Labour	Mrs M. C. Tyler	618		
Labour	R. Jackson	609		
Turnout			45.7	
Conservative win (new seat)				
Conservative win (new seat)				
Conservative win (new seat)				

=== Mill Hill ===
Mill Hill
Party	Candidate	Votes	%	±%
Conservative	Mrs C. M. Thubrun	3,442	75.0	
Conservative	A. P. Fletcher	3,438		
Conservative	A. Musgrave-Scott	3,351		
Liberal	Nrs A. Price-Davies	635	13.3	
Liberal	A. Jay	596		
Liberal	A. V. Stokes	587		
Labour	J. H. Husband	574	11.6	
Labour	Mrs M. A. Robinson	514		
Labour	Mrs B. E. Reynolds	496		
Turnout			42.9	
Conservative win (new seat)				
Conservative win (new seat)				
Conservative win (new seat)				

=== St Paul’s ===
St Paul’s
Party	Candidate	Votes	%	±%
Conservative	W. G. Hart	2,989	63.4	
Conservative	J. P. Fitzgibbon	2,969		
Conservative	N. J. Sapsted	2,916		
Liberal	J. S. Hill	1,114	23.5	
Liberal	J. L. Norris	1,091		
Liberal	L. W. Watkins	1,055		
Labour	Mrs J. M. Allen	635	13.0	
Labour	G. Dunn	612		
Labour	M. B. Devane	575		
Turnout			41.0	
Conservative win (new seat)				
Conservative win (new seat)				
Conservative win (new seat)				

=== Totteridge ===
Totteridge
Party	Candidate	Votes	%	±%
Conservative	F. D. Gibson	3,758	79.4	
Conservative	V. H. Usher	3,721		
Conservative	Mrs B. M. Franklin	3,698		
Liberal	C. A. Roberts	665	12.5	
Liberal	Mrs G. M. Oliver	562		
Liberal	Mrs C. R. Miller	539		
Labour	A. A. Grant	447	8.0	
Labour	Mrs T. Segal	364		
Labour	H. J. Gross	321		
Turnout			41.8	
Conservative win (new seat)				
Conservative win (new seat)				
Conservative win (new seat)				

=== West Hendon ===
West Hendon
Party	Candidate	Votes	%	±%
Conservative	Mrs N. L. Cullinane	1,750	61.9	
Conservative	F. N. Cobbb	1,705		
Conservative	W. C. James	1,638		
Labour	A. D. Farbey	709	25.3	
Labour	B. A. Le Mare	689		
Labour	Mrs J. Miller	688		
Liberal	Mrs C. I. Gordon	364	12.8	
Liberal	F. Olins	348		
Liberal	N. B. Primost	339		
Turnout			31.3	
Conservative win (new seat)				
Conservative win (new seat)				
Conservative win (new seat)				

=== Woodhouse ===
Woodhouse
Party	Candidate	Votes	%	±%
Conservative	D. C. Burton	2,632	65.8	
Conservative	K. A. Clarke	2,608		
Conservative	Mrs D. G. Bradbury	2,582		
Labour	A. E. Tomlinson	939	22.2	
Labour	E. S. Turpin	853		
Labour	T. J. K. Sims	846		
Liberal	D. Morgan	460	10.0	
Liberal	G. S. Shocket	412		
Liberal	S. C. Winter	383		
Communist	Mrs Z. Curtis	172	1.4	
Turnout			35.8	
Conservative win (new seat)				
Conservative win (new seat)				
Conservative win (new seat)				

== By-elections between 1968 and 1971 ==
=== Colindale ===
Colindale by-election, 7 May 1970
Party	Candidate	Votes	%	±%
Labour	B. E. McCormack	1,515		
Conservative	L. J. Pym	1,106		
Liberal	B. A. Wrigley	320		
Turnout			39.7%	

=== Friern Barnet ===
Friern Barnet by-election, 10 June 1970
Party	Candidate	Votes	%	±%
Conservative	J. C. Tiplady	1,616		
Liberal	S. C. Winter	277		
Labour	M. A. N. Goddard	263		
Turnout			18.6%	

=== Hadley ===
Hadley by-election, 10 June 1970
Party	Candidate	Votes	%	±%
Conservative	Mrs R. W. Middleton	1,907		
Labour	R. H. Potter	726		
Liberal	B. A. Standing	616		
Independent	A. J. Freake	506		
Turnout			28.3%	

=== Childs Hill ===
Childs Hill by-election, 25 September 1970
Party	Candidate	Votes	%	±%
Conservative	B. A. Jarman	1,192		
Liberal	Monroe Edward Palmer	874		
Labour	L. W. Cole	628		
Turnout			21.9%	
