= 1982 Barnet London Borough Council election =

1982 local election in England

- 6 May 1982

All 60 seats to Barnet London Borough Council 31 seats needed for a majority
- Turnout: 43.3%

	First party	Second party
Party	Conservative	Labour
Seats won	48	12
Seat change	▼2	▲2
Percentage	48.8%	23.9%
- Map of the results of the 1982 Barnet London Borough council election. Conservatives in blue and Labour in red.
Council control before election
Conservative
Council control after election
Conservative

The 1982 Barnet Council election took place on 6 May 1982 to elect members of Barnet London Borough Council in London, England. The whole council was up for election and the Conservative Party stayed in overall control of the council.

== Election result ==
Overall turnout in the election was 43.3%.

Barnet local election result 1982
Party	Seats	Gains	Losses	Net gain/loss	Seats %	Votes %	Votes	+/−
Conservative	48	1	3	-2		48.8		
Labour	12	3	1	+2		23.9		
Alliance	0	0	0	0	0.0	26.2		

== Ward results ==
=== Arkley ===
Arkley (3 seats)
Party	Candidate	Votes	%	±%
Conservative	John T. Thomson	2,331		
Conservative	Michael E. Weeks	2.170		
Conservative	Wilfred Lipman	2,169		
Alliance	Jean W. Hawkins	1.575		
Alliance	David J. Shannon	1,476		
Alliance	Norman H. Feltz	1,443		
Labour	Josephine M. Edwards	1,303		
Labour	Hukam C. Chopra	1.253		
Labour	Philip Rowe	1.226		
Turnout			%	
Conservative hold		Swing		
Conservative hold		Swing		
Conservative gain from Labour		Swing		

=== Brunswick Park ===
Brunswick Park (3 seats)
Party	Candidate	Votes	%	±%
Conservative	Donald R. Goodman	2,603		
Conservative	Mary B. Perry	2,563		
Conservative	Mary Temple	2,485		
Alliance	Keith Crawford	908		
Alliance	Janina E. Nesbitt	890		
Alliance	Anne J. Gelbhardt	848		
Labour	Percy Cheek	674		
Labour	Grace K. Wilkinson	628		
Labour	Peter B. Wilkinson	595		
Independent	George G. Byron	126		
Turnout			%	
Conservative hold		Swing		
Conservative hold		Swing		
Conservative hold		Swing		

=== Burnt Oak ===
Burnt Oak (3 seats)
Party	Candidate	Votes	%	±%
Labour	James P. Brophy	2,203		
Labour	Henry J. Timothy	1,803		
Labour	Peter J. Fordham	1,775		
Conservative	Peter J.P. Edwards	911		
Conservative	Keith R. Bass	833		
Conservative	Patricia M. Sparrow	787		
Alliance	George W.H. Allen	673		
Alliance	Alan V. Simpson	614		
Alliance	Miriam Levy	533		
Turnout			%	
Labour hold		Swing		
Labour hold		Swing		
Labour hold		Swing		

=== Childs Hill ===
Childs Hill (3 seats)
Party	Candidate	Votes	%	±%
Conservative	Alfred Young	1,556		
Conservative	Stuart J. Scott	1,528		
Conservative	Brian A. Jarman	1,490		
Alliance	Monroe Edward Palmer	1,470		
Alliance	Lilian E. Geach	1,281		
Alliance	Joan Lawson	1,261		
Labour	Sean J. Clegg	1,078		
Labour	Anthony M. Williams	1,031		
Labour	Andrew S. Redpath	1,019		
Turnout			%	
Conservative hold		Swing		
Conservative hold		Swing		
Conservative hold		Swing		

=== Colindale ===
Colindale (3 seats)
Party	Candidate	Votes	%	±%
Labour	Geoffrey N. Cooke	1,483		
Labour	Mary H.R. Honeyball	1,393		
Labour	Thomas A. McKendry	1,311		
Conservative	Maxton N. Brooker	1,300		
Alliance	Jack B. Cohen	1,177		
Conservative	Anthony J. Antoniou	1,149		
Conservative	Arthur J. Roycroft	1.124		
Alliance	Phyllis I. Adams	1.083		
Alliance	Paula Mercer	900		
Turnout			%	
Labour hold		Swing		
Labour hold		Swing		
Labour hold		Swing		

=== East Barnet ===
East Barnet (3 seats)
Party	Candidate	Votes	%	±%
Conservative	Ernest T. Danks	2,414		
Conservative	Olwen M. Evans	2,369		
Conservative	John Perry	2,317		
Alliance	Barry Perkins	1,287		
Alliance	George Gomez	1,271		
Alliance	Clive Robinson	1,266		
Labour	Jeffrey Leifer	849		
Labour	David A.J. Lusted	818		
Labour	Nohammed A.Q. Qllraishi	745		
Turnout			%	
Conservative hold		Swing		
Conservative hold		Swing		
Conservative hold		Swing		

=== East Finchley ===
East Finchley (3 seats)
Party	Candidate	Votes	%	±%
Labour	Frances R. Crook	2,046		
Labour	John R.M. Davies	2,030		
Labour	Laurence G. Spigel	1,867		
Conservative	Lawrence W. Chivers	1,815		
Conservative	Mayurdhwajasinh J. Gohel	1,405		
Conservative	Kantilal S. Patel	1,379		
Alliance	Robert N. Lloyd	1,291		
Alliance	Leah Hertz	1,209		
Alliance	Robert S. Hanison	1,163		
Turnout			%	
Labour gain from Conservative		Swing		
Labour gain from Conservative		Swing		
Labour gain from Conservative		Swing		

=== Edgware ===
Edgware (3 seats)
Party	Candidate	Votes	%	±%
Conservative	David J. V. Hammond	2,717		
Conservative	Malcolm E. Lester	2,683		
Conservative	Archibald T.W. Smith	2,638		
Alliance	David H.J. Cohen	1,120		
Alliance	John T, Mitchell	909		
Alliance	Alan P.S. Newman	858		
Labour	Michael B. Desmond	844		
Labour	Arthur J.T. Snell	740		
Labour	John D. Welham	715		
Turnout			%	
Conservative hold		Swing		
Conservative hold		Swing		
Conservative hold		Swing		

=== Finchley ===
Finchley (3 seats)
Party	Candidate	Votes	%	±%
Conservative	Leslie Sussman	2,460		
Conservative	Miles C. Golding	2,404		
Conservative	Barbara I. Langstone	2,341		
Labour	Colin Shindler	1,497		
Labour	Brian J. Watkins	1,481		
Labour	Judith A. Craven	1,475		
Alliance	John N.H. Foss	461		
Alliance	Alan W. Mather	411		
Alliance	Pratar S. Mehta	405		
Turnout			41.4%	
Conservative hold		Swing		
Conservative hold		Swing		
Conservative hold		Swing		

=== Friern Barnet ===
Friern Barnet (3 seats)
Party	Candidate	Votes	%	±%
Conservative	David C. Burton	2,674		
Conservative	Frank D. Gibson	2,627		
Conservative	John C. Tiplady	2,590		
Alliance	Christopher Perkin	1,213		
Alliance	Bruce A. Standing	1,209		
Alliance	Frank Davis	1,183		
Labour	Peter R. Butcher	921		
Labour	Stephanie H.M. Dardis	862		
Labour	Harry Kerens	806		
Turnout			%	
Conservative hold		Swing		
Conservative hold		Swing		
Conservative hold		Swing		

=== Garden Suburb ===
Garden Suburb (3 seats)
Party	Candidate	Votes	%	±%
Conservative	Michael G. Max	2,543		
Conservative	Roy M. Shutz	2,480		
Conservative	Clement Halfon	2,409		
Alliance	Kenneth A. Craig	1,746		
Alliance	Peter D. Falk	1,715		
Alliance	Viola Haire	1,609		
Labour	Jenny F. Manson	547		
Labour	Gerald D. Shamash	543		
Labour	Naomi E. Angell	532		
Turnout			%	
Conservative hold		Swing		
Conservative hold		Swing		
Conservative hold		Swing		

=== Golders Green ===
Golders Green (3 seats)
Party	Candidate	Votes	%	±%
Conservative	Melvin Cohen	1,846		
Conservative	Leslie D. Foster	1,679		
Conservative	Selina D. Summers	1,590		
Alliance	Barrie R. Milnson	1,261		
Alliance	David I. Leadercramer	1,191		
Alliance	Panayoutis P. Panteli	1,023		
Labour	Mildred Gordon	833		
Labour	Montilgue Miller	758		
Labour	John S. Habershon	745		
Turnout			%	
Conservative hold		Swing		
Conservative hold		Swing		
Conservative hold		Swing		

=== Hadley ===
Hadley (3 seats)
Party	Candidate	Votes	%	±%
Conservative	David P. Clarke	3,058		
Conservative	Ann S.M. More	2,869		
Conservative	John D. Rawles	2,549		
Independent	Anthony J. Freake	2,245		
Alliance	Geoffrey M. Fallows	1,663		
Alliance	Rosemary M. Watkins	1,541		
Alliance	Anthony Rowan-Wicks	1,466		
Labour	Anita Campbell	677		
Labour	Jean M. Feldman,	668		
Labour	Andrew P. Harris	619		
Turnout			%	
Conservative hold		Swing		
Conservative hold		Swing		
Conservative hold		Swing		

=== Hale ===
Hale (3 seats)
Party	Candidate	Votes	%	±%
Conservative	Leslie J. Pym	2,688		
Conservative	Dorothy B. Benson	2,516		
Conservative	Jack Clarfelt	2,450		
Alliance	Diana C. Pattison	1,351		
Alliance	Ian C. Albert	1,251		
Alliance	Quintin J. Iwi	1,227		
Labour	John H. Smith	645		
Labour	Rita Erent	604		
Labour	Heung M. Farnham	593		
Turnout			%	
Conservative hold		Swing		
Conservative hold		Swing		
Conservative hold		Swing		

=== Hendon ===
Hendon (3 seats)
Party	Candidate	Votes	%	±%
Conservative	Norman E. Hirshfield	2,184		
Conservative	Victor S. Hockley	2,125		
Conservative	John Archard-Jones	1,872		
Alliance	Anne S. Godfrey	1,316		
Alliance	Harold M. Defries	1,278		
Alliance	Alan M. Magnus	1,276		
Labour	Barrie S. Brown	1,000		
Labour	Mary M. McShane	945		
Labour	Martin C. Earl	937		
Turnout			%	
Conservative hold		Swing		
Conservative hold		Swing		
Conservative hold		Swing		

=== Mill Hill ===
Mill Hill (3 seats)
Party	Candidate	Votes	%	±%
Conservative	Denis L. Dippel	2,883		
Conservative	John R. Hart	2,846		
Conservative	Stanley J. Sorrell	2,733		
Alliance	Harold B. Davies	1,244		
Alliance	John R. Sillence	1,136		
Alliance	Linda B. Craig	1,123		
Labour	Paul G. Sarton	728		
Labour	Karen P. Buck	706		
Labour	Ian D. Parker	690		
Turnout			%	
Conservative hold		Swing		
Conservative hold		Swing		
Conservative hold		Swing		

=== St Paul's ===
St Paul's (3 seats)
Party	Candidate	Votes	%	±%
Conservative	William G. Hart	2,305		
Conservative	Edna P. James	2,150		
Conservative	Mary Phillips	2,113		
Labour	Michael L. Freeman	1,368		
Labour	Janet A. Briffett	1,295		
Labour	Catherine Lyons	1,220		
Alliance	Kenneth L. Hunter	1,061		
Alliance	Krishan D. Saggar	1,058		
Alliance	Derek M. Joseph	1,006		
Independent	John P. Fitzgibbon	516		
Turnout			%	
Conservative hold		Swing		
Conservative hold		Swing		
Conservative hold		Swing		

=== Totteridge ===
Totteridge (3 seats)
Party	Candidate	Votes	%	±%
Conservative	Michael J. Hill	3,090		
Conservative	Victor H. Usher	3,025		
Conservative	Victor Lyon	2,974		
Alliance	David H. Ive	1,230		
Alliance	Josephine M. Wagerman	1,208		
Alliance	David Raff	1,206		
Labour	Jack J. Jaffe	672		
Labour	Brenda M. Peck	626		
Labour	Alexander C. Wills	587		
Turnout			%	
Conservative hold		Swing		
Conservative hold		Swing		
Conservative hold		Swing		

=== West Hendon ===
West Hendon (3 seats)
Party	Candidate	Votes	%	±%
Labour	Timothy J. Sims	1,701		
Labour	Agnes C. Slocombe	1,558		
Labour	Doreen N. Neall	1,548		
Conservative	Joseph M.H. Hunter	1,516		
Conservative	Carole L. Ovenden	1,489		
Conservative	William D. Whittaker	1,474		
Alliance	Jack Bright	1,362		
Alliance	Harry J. Levy	1,294		
Alliance	Alan H. Finlay	1,283		
Turnout			%	
Labour hold		Swing		
Labour hold		Swing		
Labour hold		Swing		

=== Woodhouse ===
Woodhouse (3 seats)
Party	Candidate	Votes	%	±%
Conservative	Graham P. Halliday	2,135		
Conservative	Philip H. Williams	2,126		
Conservative	Kenneth J. Woffenden	2,021		
Labour	Martin J. O'Connor	1,326		
Labour	Eyo I. Nkune	1,189		
Labour	Diane Rogoff	1,168		
Alliance	Michael M. Cole	1,048		
Alliance	Michael J. O'Donovan	1,039		
Alliance	Leonard W. Watkins	1,036		
Turnout			%	
Conservative hold		Swing		
Conservative hold		Swing		
Conservative hold		Swing		

== By-elections between 1982 and 1986 ==
=== St Paul's ===
St Paul's by-election, 27 October 1983
Party	Candidate	Votes	%	±%
Labour	Michael L. Freeman	1,414		
Conservative	lan S. Balcombe	1,069		
Alliance	Krishaan D. Saggar	471		
Ind. Conservative	John P. Fitzgibbon	334		
Ecology	Maureen T. Colmans	59		
Turnout		3,347	29.0	
Labour gain from Conservative		Swing		

The by-election was called following the death of Cllr. William G. Hart.
