= 1974 Barnet London Borough Council election =

1974 local election in England

- 2 May 1974

All 60 seats to Barnet London Borough Council 31 seats needed for a majority
- Turnout: 39.1%

	First party	Second party	Third party
Party	Conservative	Labour	Residents
Seats before	43	17	0
Seats won	42	17	1
Seat change	▼1	0	▲1
Percentage	48.3%	33.1%	1.1%
Swing	▼1.1%	▼4.7%	▲0.5%
Council control before election
Conservative
Council control after election
Conservative

The 1974 Barnet Council election took place on 2 May 1974 to elect members of Barnet London Borough Council in London, England. The whole council was up for election and the Conservative Party stayed in overall control of the council. There were 60 councillors elected in 20 wards, each with 3 councillors, out of which 42 were Conservative, 17 were Labour and one represented the Hadley Ward Residents' Association. There also 10 aldermen, 8 Conservative and 2 Labour.

== Election result ==
Overall turnout in the election was 39.1%.

Barnet local election result 1974
Party	Seats	Gains	Losses	Net gain/loss	Seats %	Votes %	Votes	+/−
Conservative	42	3	4	-1	70.0	48.3		-1.1
Labour	17	3	3	0	28.3	33.1		-4.7
Residents	1	1	0	+1	1.7	1.1		+0.5
Liberal	0	0	0	0	0.0	17.5		+5.9

== Ward results ==
=== Arkley ===
Arkley
Party	Candidate	Votes	%	±%
Conservative	J. P. Moran	1,899		
Conservative	Mrs A. S. M. More	1,849		
Labour	Mrs J. E. Pudney	1,829		
Conservative	A. M. Rawle	1,771		
Labour	T. Scott	1,704		
Labour	L. Cohen	1,588		
Liberal	Mrs D. E. Pannell	799		
Turnout			37.3	
Conservative gain from Labour		Swing		
Conservative gain from Labour		Swing		
Labour hold		Swing		

=== Brunswick Park ===
Brunswick Park
Party	Candidate	Votes	%	±%
Conservative	Mrs J. M. Cole	2,280		
Conservative	J. S. Payne	2,272		
Conservative	Miss M. Temple	2,175		
Liberal	C. Bone	1,012		
Labour	Miss S. S. Seagroatt	979		
Labour	J. Britz	919		
Labour	L. R. Kealey	905		
Turnout			37.2	
Conservative hold		Swing		
Conservative hold		Swing		
Conservative hold		Swing		

=== Burnt Oak ===
Burnt Oak
Party	Candidate	Votes	%	±%
Labour	J. S. Champion	2,489		
Labour	C. A. R. Lathrope	2,172		
Labour	R. Robinson	2,115		
Conservative	C. Turbutt	520		
Conservative	B. S. Mawhinney	481		
Conservative	R. M. Schleimer	475		
Liberal	J. F. Hearn	300		
Liberal	Mrs H. D. Munden	187		
Liberal	Mrs S. S. Palmer	161		
Turnout			35.8	
Labour hold		Swing		
Labour hold		Swing		
Labour hold		Swing		

=== Childs Hill ===
Childs Hill
Party	Candidate	Votes	%	±%
Labour	Mrs R. Wainwright	1,522		
Labour	A. J. D. Popper	1,517		
Conservative	A. Young	1,486		
Conservative	B.A. Jarman	1,478		
Labour	Mrs M. T. Catterson	1,460		
Conservative	V. Lyon	1,459		
Liberal	M. E. Palmer	1,237		
Liberal	I. Heichelheim	1,115		
Liberal	P. L. Smulian	1,064		
Turnout			45.0	
Labour hold		Swing		
Labour gain from Conservative		Swing		
Conservative hold		Swing		

=== Colindale ===
Colindale
Party	Candidate	Votes	%	±%
Labour	B. E. McCormack	1,566		
Labour	A. M. Williams	1,482		
Labour	Miss R. A. Thorpe-Tracey	1,466		
Conservative	Mrs G. Tweedy	919		
Conservative	J. M. R. Allen	862		
Conservative	Mrs R. F. Millett	846		
Liberal	Mrs B. C. Davis	361		
Liberal	A. W. Munden	341		
Liberal	Mrs C. T. Stokes	310		
Turnout			36.6	
Labour hold		Swing		
Labour hold		Swing		
Labour hold		Swing		

=== East Barnet ===
East Barnet
Party	Candidate	Votes	%	±%
Conservative	Mrs M. L. Slack	2,550		
Conservative	A. Pares	2,540		
Conservative	Mrs I. Storer	2,302		
Labour	W. Seagroatt	1,821		
Labour	Mrs H. Block	1,480		
Labour	V. A. Bonafont	1,395		
Liberal	Mrs P. Gilbert	703		
Turnout			42.4	
Conservative gain from Labour		Swing		
Conservative hold		Swing		
Conservative hold		Swing		

=== East Finchley ===
East Finchley
Party	Candidate	Votes	%	±%
Labour	M. J. O.Connor	1,850		
Labour	M. L. Freeman	1,750		
Labour	M. A. Cohen	1,743		
Conservative	P. A. Chalkley	1,326		
Conservative	M. C. Stern	1,326		
Conservative	Mrs B. I. Langstone	1,304		
Liberal	P. D. Watkins	759		
Liberal	Mrs R. M. Watkins	729		
Liberal	C. B. Purkis	721		
Turnout			41.8	
Labour hold		Swing		
Labour hold		Swing		
Labour hold		Swing		

=== Edgware ===
Edgware
Party	Candidate	Votes	%	±%
Conservative	D. E. Dell	2,040		
Conservative	G. I. Greenhouse	2,010		
Conservative	A. T. W. Smith	1,984		
Labour	Miss H. M. Scott	1,160		
Labour	G. S. West	1,156		
Labour	Mrs C. Gordon	1,142		
Liberal	L. H. Epstein	490		
Liberal	Mrs M. H. Schofield	424		
Liberal	J. G. R. Gair	382		
Turnout			33.4	
Conservative hold		Swing		
Conservative hold		Swing		
Conservative hold		Swing		

=== Finchley ===
Finchley
Party	Candidate	Votes	%	±%
Conservative	L. Sussman	1,869		
Conservative	M. Golding	1,844		
Conservative	Mrs J. I. Parmer	1,830		
Liberal	N. Brand	811		
Labour	K. Dillon	730		
Labour	Miss G. E. Matthews	714		
Liberal	S. B. Salik	714		
Liberal	P. G. Voller	696		
Labour	S. T. D. Rafique	659		
Turnout			32.8	
Conservative hold		Swing		
Conservative hold		Swing		
Conservative hold		Swing		

=== Friern Barnet ===
Friern Barnet
Party	Candidate	Votes	%	±%
Conservative	D. C. Burton	2,275		
Conservative	F. D. Gibson	2,272		
Conservative	J. C. Tiplady	2,265		
Labour	R. S. Dunn	1,063		
Liberal	S. P. Crossick	1,025		
Labour	J. H. J. Scammell	1,020		
Labour	C. C. Williams	1,007		
Liberal	R. B. H. Pearman	990		
Liberal	R. J. Aron	974		
Turnout			42.4	
Conservative hold		Swing		
Conservative hold		Swing		
Conservative hold		Swing		

=== Garden Suburb ===
Garden Suburb
Party	Candidate	Votes	%	±%
Conservative	P. K. Laurance	2,197		
Conservative	R. Blausten	2,126		
Conservative	Mrs P. M. Nevard	2,112		
Liberal	A. D. Cohen	1,515		
Liberal	M. Panting	1,452		
Liberal	Mrs V. F. Silbiger	1,404		
Labour	D. E. De Saxe	851		
Labour	C. J. Albu	804		
Labour	J. M. Deaner	802		
Turnout			40.8	
Conservative hold		Swing		
Conservative hold		Swing		
Conservative hold		Swing		

=== Golders Green ===
Golders Green
Party	Candidate	Votes	%	±%
Conservative	Mrs R. A. Freedman	1,645		
Conservative	C. F. Harris	1,576		
Conservative	J. S. Alexander	1,550		
Labour	L. W. J. Cole	1,344		
Labour	P. A. Thomas	1,307		
Labour	C. R. Stevens	1,246		
Liberal	L. Clayton	903		
Liberal	L. T. Edmonds	861		
Liberal	W. Newton	857		
Turnout			37.8	
Conservative hold		Swing		
Conservative hold		Swing		
Conservative hold		Swing		

=== Hadley ===
Hadley
Party	Candidate	Votes	%	±%
Conservative	E. A. E. Asker	2,690		
Residents	A. J. Freake	2,610		
Conservative	Mrs R. W. Middleton	2,596		
Conservative	P. Beevers	2,306		
Liberal	K. D. Sayers	1,100		
Labour	B. C. Barker	1,034		
Labour	Mrs J. I. Harris	967		
Labour	Mrs E. Heinersdorff	817		
Turnout			43.3	
Conservative hold		Swing		
Residents gain from Conservative		Swing		
Conservative hold		Swing		

(Hadley Ward Residents' Association)

=== Hale ===
Hale
Party	Candidate	Votes	%	±%
Conservative	L. J. Pym	2,330		
Conservative	Mrs M. J. Laskey	2,262		
Conservative	R. E. Haslehurst	2,240		
Labour	Mrs J. Smith	918		
Labour	Mrs G. McClelland	912		
Liberal	F. I. West	872		
Labour	L. Phillips	861		
Liberal	H. I. Lightstone	824		
Liberal	P. L. Miller	824		
Turnout			39.7	
Conservative hold		Swing		
Conservative hold		Swing		
Conservative hold		Swing		

=== Hendon ===
Hendon
Party	Candidate	Votes	%	±%
Conservative	J. D. Gordon-Lee	2,084		
Conservative	N. E. Hirshfield	2,019		
Conservative	V. S. Hockley	1,965		
Labour	A. M. Magnus	1,369		
Labour	Mrs D. N. Neall	1,332		
Labour	C. H. Jacobs	1,327		
Liberal	Mrs A. S. Godfrey	968		
Liberal	I. D. Scott	932		
Liberal	A. Gilbey	896		
Turnout			40.0	
Conservative hold		Swing		
Conservative hold		Swing		
Conservative hold		Swing		

=== Mill Hill ===
Mill Hill
Party	Candidate	Votes	%	±%
Conservative	Mrs R. M. Levy	2,675		
Conservative	G. G. Fear	2,547		
Conservative	D. L. Dippel	2,506		
Labour	R. Walker	938		
Labour	P. J. Fordham	934		
Labour	P. Fowles	900		
Liberal	R. N. Page	797		
Liberal	A. V. Stokes	796		
Liberal	Mrs D. C. Pattison	788		
Turnout			41.5	
Conservative hold		Swing		
Conservative hold		Swing		
Conservative hold		Swing		

=== St Paul’s ===
St Paul’s
Party	Candidate	Votes	%	±%
Conservative	P. J. Fitzgibbon	1,898		
Conservative	Mrs E. P. James	1,842		
Conservative	N. J. Sapsted	1,835		
Labour	B. J. O'Sullivan	1,481		
Labour	T. C. Thomas	1,430		
Labour	Mrs B. M. Clements	1,371		
Liberal	L. W. Watkins	870		
Liberal	D. A. Harris	794		
Liberal	A. D. Wayne	791		
Turnout			39.6	
Conservative hold		Swing		
Conservative hold		Swing		
Conservative hold		Swing		

=== Totteridge ===
Totteridge
Party	Candidate	Votes	%	±%
Conservative	Mrs B. M. Franklin	2,703		
Conservative	V. H. Usher	2,672		
Conservative	M. J. Hill	2,622		
Liberal	F. J. Roper	807		
Liberal	R. G. Macdonald	764		
Liberal	B. A. Standing	759		
Labour	M. S. Cohen	666		
Labour	G. N. Cooke	666		
Labour	Mrs E. J. Grigg	647		
Turnout			38.3	
Conservative hold		Swing		
Conservative hold		Swing		
Conservative hold		Swing		

=== West Hendon ===
West Hendon
Party	Candidate	Votes	%	±%
Labour	T. J. Sims	1,582		
Labour	D. E. Timms	1,541		
Labour	J. D. Roith	1,540		
Conservative	Mrs J. Cobb	1,304		
Conservative	Mrs J. Partridge	1,304		
Conservative	J. Archard Jones	1,202		
Liberal	L. Jay	567		
Liberal	A. D. Mercer	532		
Liberal	Mrs M. J. Mills	529		
Turnout			39.2	
Labour hold		Swing		
Labour hold		Swing		
Labour hold		Swing		

=== Woodhouse ===
Woodhouse
Party	Candidate	Votes	%	±%
Labour	A. E. Tomlinson	1,672		
Labour	I. S. Grier	1,624		
Conservative	K. A. Clarke	1,597		
Labour	B. E. Anderson	1,576		
Conservative	Mrs C. J. C. Levinson	1,552		
Conservative	C. W. Wilds	1,524		
Liberal	R. J. Eccles	684		
Liberal	J. T. Smith	677		
Liberal	F. G. Collins	674		
Turnout			35.8	
Labour gain from Conservative		Swing		
Labour gain from Conservative		Swing		
Conservative hold		Swing		

== By-elections between 1974 and 1978 ==
=== Brunswick Park ===
Brunswick Park by-election, 23 January 1975
Party	Candidate	Votes	%	±%
Conservative	Anthony M. Rawle	1,603		
Liberal	David J. Terwey	892		
Labour	Andrew P. Harris	746		
Turnout			30.8	

=== Woodhouse ===
Woodhouse by-election, 28 October 1976
Party	Candidate	Votes	%	±%
Conservative	Philip H. Williams	1,616		
Labour	Geoffrey N. Cooke	942		
National Front	John E. Warner	410		
Liberal	Robert J. Eccles	351		
Turnout			26.7	

=== Burnt Oak ===
Burnt Oak by-election, 14 April 1977
Party	Candidate	Votes	%	±%
Labour	Frederick J. Collisson	1,633		
Conservative	Brian C. Gordon	816		
National Front	Bernard F. Franklin	517		
Liberal	Hugh J. Ogus	130		
Turnout			32.8	

=== East Barnet ===
East Barnet by-election, 29 September 1977
Party	Candidate	Votes	%	±%
Conservative	Howard J. Peters	1,504		
Labour	Olga G. Deaner	728		
Liberal	Britton T. J. Goudie	390		
National Front	Philip A. Ruddock	204		
Turnout			25.3	
