= 2002 Barnet London Borough Council election =

2002 local election in England

- 2 May 2002

All 63 seats to Barnet London Borough Council 32 seats needed for a majority
| | First party | Second party | Third party |
|---|---|---|---|
| Party | Conservative | Labour | Liberal Democrats |
| Seats won | 33 | 24 | 6 |
| Seat change | ▲11 | ▼5 | ▼3 |
| Popular vote | 32,882 | 28,041 | 14,176 |
| Percentage | 39.7% | 33.9% | 17.1% |
| Swing | ▲1.2% | ▼6.1% | ▲0.8% |
- Map of the results of the 2002 Barnet council election. Conservatives in blue, Labour in red and Liberal Democrats in yellow.
Council control before election
Conservative Party (UK)
Council control after election
Conservative Party (UK)

The 2002 Barnet Council election took place on 2 May 2002 to elect members of Barnet London Borough Council in London, England. The whole council was up for election and the Conservative party gained overall control of the council, replacing the Labour-Liberal Democrat coalition that had governed Barnet for the previous 8 years.

== Background ==
Before the election a Labour-Liberal Democrat coalition ran the council. Since the last election in 1998, the Local Government Commission carried out a periodic electoral review of Barnet under the Local Government Act 1992 and made a number of boundary changes increasing the number of seats by three.

== Election result ==
Overall turnout in the election was 34.04%.

Barnet local election result 2002
| Party | Seats | Gains | Losses | Net gain/loss | Seats % | Votes % | Votes | +/− |
|---|---|---|---|---|---|---|---|---|
| Conservative | 33 | | | +5 | 52.4 | 42.7 | 94,692 | |
| Labour | 24 | | | -2 | 38.1 | 36.0 | 79,775 | |
| Liberal Democrats | 6 | | | 0 | 9.5 | 17.8 | 39,470 | |
| Green | 0 | | | 0 | 0 | 3.1 | 6,822 | |
| Independent | 0 | | | 0 | 0 | 0.4 | 854 | |
| UKIP | 0 | 0 | 0 | 0 | 0 | 0.1 | 148 | |

== Ward results ==
=== Brunswick Park ===
Brunswick Park (3 seats)
| Party | Candidate | Votes | % | ±% |
|---|---|---|---|---|
| Conservative | Andreas Tambourides* | 2,278 | 50.6 | |
| Conservative | Daniel Hope | 2,269 | 50.4 | |
| Conservative | Lynne Hillan* | 2,267 | 50.3 | |
| Labour | Geoffrey Cooke* | 1,627 | 36.1 | |
| Labour | Antonakis Vourou | 1,494 | 33.2 | |
| Labour | Kelly Tebb | 1,488 | 33.0 | |
| Liberal Democrats | Peter Finlayson | 463 | 10.3 | |
| Liberal Democrats | Margaret Neil | 443 | 9.8 | |
| Liberal Democrats | Charles Wicksteed | 323 | 7.2 | |
| Green | Dennis Vigay | 257 | 5.7 | |
| Turnout | | 4,506 | 40.8 | |
| Conservative win (new seat) | | | | |
| Conservative win (new seat) | | | | |
| Conservative win (new seat) | | | | |

=== Burnt Oak ===
Burnt Oak (3 seats)
| Party | Candidate | Votes | % | ±% |
|---|---|---|---|---|
| Labour | Allan Turner* | 1,675 | 69.6 | |
| Labour | Alan Williams* | 1,657 | 68.8 | |
| Labour | Linda McFadyen* | 1,496 | 62.2 | |
| Conservative | Patricia Sparrow | 426 | 17.7 | |
| Conservative | Joanne Williams | 412 | 17.1 | |
| Conservative | Rene Braun | 411 | 17.1 | |
| Green | Audrey Poppy | 194 | 8.1 | |
| Liberal Democrats | Michael Roberts | 145 | 6.0 | |
| Liberal Democrats | Karen Hatchett | 144 | 6.0 | |
| Liberal Democrats | Hewryk Freszczur | 82 | 3.4 | |
| Turnout | | 2,407 | 24.3 | |
| Labour win (new seat) | | | | |
| Labour win (new seat) | | | | |
| Labour win (new seat) | | | | |

=== Childs Hill ===
Childs Hill (3 seats)
| Party | Candidate | Votes | % | ±% |
|---|---|---|---|---|
| Liberal Democrats | Jack Cohen* | 1,779 | 51.3 | |
| Liberal Democrats | Monroe Palmer* | 1,775 | 51.2 | |
| Liberal Democrats | Susette Palmer* | 1,703 | 49.1 | |
| Conservative | Malcolm Harris | 856 | 24.7 | |
| Conservative | Jonathan Herbst | 790 | 22.8 | |
| Conservative | Jagmail Gill | 740 | 21.3 | |
| Labour | David Robinson | 717 | 20.7 | |
| Labour | Claire Farrier | 688 | 19.5 | |
| Labour | Dilip Mitra | 607 | 17.5 | |
| Green | Julie Rosenfield | 288 | 8.3 | |
| Turnout | | 3,469 | 29.4 | |
| Liberal Democrats win (new seat) | | | | |
| Liberal Democrats win (new seat) | | | | |
| Liberal Democrats win (new seat) | | | | |

=== Colindale ===
Colindale (3 seats)
| Party | Candidate | Votes | % | ±% |
|---|---|---|---|---|
| Labour | Danish Chopra* | 1,314 | 61.9 | |
| Labour | Gillian Sargeant* | 1,302 | 61.3 | |
| Labour | Alan Sloam | 1,219 | 57.4 | |
| Conservative | Keith Dyall | 376 | 17.7 | |
| Conservative | Marilyn Manning | 376 | 17.7 | |
| Conservative | Ashton Doherty | 374 | 17.6 | |
| Liberal Democrats | Daniel Estermann | 294 | 13.8 | |
| Liberal Democrats | Philip Reynolds | 282 | 13.3 | |
| Liberal Democrats | Geoffrey Jacobs | 238 | 11.2 | |
| Green | John Incenzo | 156 | 7.3 | |
| Turnout | | 2,123 | 20.7 | |
| Labour win (new seat) | | | | |
| Labour win (new seat) | | | | |
| Labour win (new seat) | | | | |

=== Coppetts ===
Coppetts (3 seats)
| Party | Candidate | Votes | % | ±% |
|---|---|---|---|---|
| Labour | Paul Rogers* | 1,816 | 51.3 | |
| Labour | Barry Rawlings* | 1,742 | 49.2 | |
| Labour | Soon-Hoe Teh | 1,578 | 44.6 | |
| Conservative | Mukesh Depala | 1,119 | 31.6 | |
| Conservative | Jonathan Shrank | 1,086 | 30.7 | |
| Conservative | Poli Tsoukka | 1,026 | 29.0 | |
| Liberal Democrats | Mark Ashfield | 443 | 12.5 | |
| Liberal Democrats | Kathleen Lamprell | 439 | 12.4 | |
| Liberal Democrats | Nicholas Sullivan | 387 | 10.9 | |
| Green | David Gutmann | 381 | 10.8 | |
| Turnout | | 3,542 | 31.8 | |
| Labour win (new seat) | | | | |
| Labour win (new seat) | | | | |
| Labour win (new seat) | | | | |

=== East Barnet ===
East Barnet (3 seats)
| Party | Candidate | Votes | % | ±% |
|---|---|---|---|---|
| Conservative | Olwen Evans* | 2,157 | 46.3 | |
| Conservative | Terence Burton | 2,074 | 44.6 | |
| Conservative | Susan Steinberg | 2,069 | 44.4 | |
| Labour | Anne Jarvis* | 1,969 | 42.3 | |
| Labour | Gordon Massey | 1,792 | 38.5 | |
| Labour | Timothy Roberts | 1,706 | 36.6 | |
| Liberal Democrats | Elizabeth Wardle | 461 | 9.9 | |
| Liberal Democrats | Leonard Watkins | 441 | 9.5 | |
| Liberal Democrats | Rosemary Mayes | 394 | 8.5 | |
| Green | Tracey Mason | 393 | 8.4 | |
| Turnout | | 4,655 | 40.6 | |
| Conservative win (new seat) | | | | |
| Conservative win (new seat) | | | | |
| Conservative win (new seat) | | | | |

=== East Finchley ===
East Finchley (3 seats)
| Party | Candidate | Votes | % | ±% |
|---|---|---|---|---|
| Labour | Alison Moore* | 2,013 | 54.0 | |
| Labour | Colin Rogers | 1,933 | 51.8 | |
| Labour | Phil Yeoman* | 1,900 | 50.9 | |
| Conservative | Dermott Donnelly | 879 | 23.6 | |
| Conservative | Andrew Berkeley | 823 | 22.1 | |
| Conservative | Manish Depala | 798 | 21.4 | |
| Green | Noel Lynch | 626 | 16.8 | |
| Liberal Democrats | Joyce Arram | 547 | 14.7 | |
| Liberal Democrats | Stephen Barber | 489 | 13.1 | |
| Liberal Democrats | Philip Avery | 365 | 9.8 | |
| UKIP | Stuart Rising | 148 | 4.0 | |
| Turnout | | 3,730 | 35.1 | |
| Labour win (new seat) | | | | |
| Labour win (new seat) | | | | |
| Labour win (new seat) | | | | |

=== Edgware ===
Edgware (3 seats)
| Party | Candidate | Votes | % | ±% |
|---|---|---|---|---|
| Conservative | Helena Hart | 1,861 | 51.8 | |
| Conservative | Malcolm Lester* | 1,854 | 51.6 | |
| Conservative | Joan Scannell* | 1,792 | 49.9 | |
| Labour | Harold Russell | 966 | 26.9 | |
| Labour | Rajasingham Jayadevan | 897 | 25.0 | |
| Labour | Pierre Jeanmarie | 859 | 23.9 | |
| Liberal Democrats | Elias Abeles | 592 | 16.5 | |
| Liberal Democrats | Mira Levy | 468 | 13.0 | |
| Independent | Colin Leci | 331 | 9.2 | |
| Liberal Democrats | Diana Iwi | 292 | 8.1 | |
| Green | Debra Green | 251 | 7.0 | |
| Turnout | | 3,590 | 32.3 | |
| Conservative win (new seat) | | | | |
| Conservative win (new seat) | | | | |
| Conservative win (new seat) | | | | |

=== Finchley Church End ===
Finchley Church End (3 seats)
| Party | Candidate | Votes | % | ±% |
|---|---|---|---|---|
| Conservative | Eva Greenspan* | 2,126 | 58.7 | |
| Conservative | Leslie Sussman* | 2,047 | 56.5 | |
| Conservative | Mike Freer* | 1,971 | 54.4 | |
| Labour | Mary McGuirk | 930 | 25.7 | |
| Labour | Nick Guest | 919 | 25.4 | |
| Labour | Lily Mitchell | 899 | 24.8 | |
| Green | Miranda Dunn | 396 | 10.9 | |
| Liberal Democrats | Keith Rodwell | 387 | 10.7 | |
| Liberal Democrats | Millicent Watkins | 344 | 9.5 | |
| Liberal Democrats | Peter Lusher | 331 | 9.1 | |
| Turnout | | 3,623 | 34.3 | |
| Conservative win (new seat) | | | | |
| Conservative win (new seat) | | | | |
| Conservative win (new seat) | | | | |

=== Garden Suburb ===
Garden Suburb (3 seats)
| Party | Candidate | Votes | % | ±% |
|---|---|---|---|---|
| Conservative | John Marshall* | 2,262 | 56.0 | |
| Conservative | Vanessa Gearson* | 1,913 | 47.3 | |
| Conservative | Jazmin Naghar* | 1,815 | 44.9 | |
| Liberal Democrats | Marjorie Harris | 1,343 | 33.2 | |
| Liberal Democrats | Alison Marshall | 1,286 | 31.8 | |
| Liberal Democrats | Simon Kovar | 1,124 | 27.8 | |
| Labour | Rachel Cashman | 549 | 13.6 | |
| Labour | Fred Tyler | 435 | 10.8 | |
| Labour | Julian Mason | 414 | 10.2 | |
| Green | Andrew Farrer | 313 | 7.7 | |
| Turnout | | 4,042 | 38.8 | |
| Conservative win (new seat) | | | | |
| Conservative win (new seat) | | | | |
| Conservative win (new seat) | | | | |

=== Golders Green ===
Golders Green (3 seats)
| Party | Candidate | Votes | % | ±% |
|---|---|---|---|---|
| Conservative | Melvin Cohen* | 2,160 | 59.4 | |
| Conservative | Aba Dunner* | 2,154 | 59.2 | |
| Conservative | Christopher Harris* | 2,019 | 55.5 | |
| Labour | Mira Goldberg | 1,014 | 27.9 | |
| Labour | Jean Thorp | 945 | 26.0 | |
| Labour | Bill Thorp | 893 | 24.5 | |
| Liberal Democrats | Leonie Stephen | 304 | 8.4 | |
| Liberal Democrats | Inge Graber | 285 | 7.8 | |
| Liberal Democrats | John Sutcliffe | 267 | 7.3 | |
| Green | Dolores Incenzo | 229 | 6.3 | |
| Turnout | | 3,639 | 37.4 | |
| Conservative win (new seat) | | | | |
| Conservative win (new seat) | | | | |
| Conservative win (new seat) | | | | |

=== Hale ===
Hale (3 seats)
| Party | Candidate | Votes | % | ±% |
|---|---|---|---|---|
| Labour | Steven Blomer* | 1,879 | 44.6 | |
| Labour | Ruth Nyman* | 1,855 | 44.0 | |
| Conservative | Brian Gordon* | 1,801 | 42.7 | |
| Labour | Zakia Zubairi | 1,678 | 39.8 | |
| Conservative | Caroline Margo | 1,618 | 38.4 | |
| Conservative | Hugh Rayner | 1,598 | 37.9 | |
| Liberal Democrats | Phyllis Fiander | 446 | 10.6 | |
| Liberal Democrats | Sheila Gottsche | 433 | 10.3 | |
| Liberal Democrats | Anthony Rowlands | 407 | 9.7 | |
| Green | David Lake | 256 | 6.1 | |
| Turnout | | 4,215 | 36.5 | |
| Labour win (new seat) | | | | |
| Labour win (new seat) | | | | |
| Conservative win (new seat) | | | | |

=== Hendon ===
Hendon (3 seats)
| Party | Candidate | Votes | % | ±% |
|---|---|---|---|---|
| Conservative | Tony Finn* | 1,591 | 45.1 | |
| Conservative | Maureen Braun* | 1,492 | 42.3 | |
| Conservative | Matthew Offord | 1,345 | 38.1 | |
| Liberal Democrats | Jason Moleman | 1,122 | 31.8 | |
| Liberal Democrats | Michael Green | 1,084 | 30.7 | |
| Liberal Democrats | Steven Deller | 1,039 | 29.4 | |
| Labour | Aubrey Ross | 827 | 23.4 | |
| Labour | Anthony Boulton | 668 | 18.9 | |
| Labour | Doreen Neall | 662 | 18.7 | |
| Green | Georgia Theodorou | 207 | 5.9 | |
| Turnout | | 3,531 | 30.5 | |
| Conservative win (new seat) | | | | |
| Conservative win (new seat) | | | | |
| Conservative win (new seat) | | | | |

=== High Barnet ===
High Barnet (3 seats)
| Party | Candidate | Votes | % | ±% |
|---|---|---|---|---|
| Conservative | Wendy Prentice* | 2,225 | 54.9 | |
| Conservative | Katia David* | 2,129 | 52.5 | |
| Conservative | Kanti Patel* | 1,989 | 49.1 | |
| Labour | Alison Rogers | 1,054 | 26.0 | |
| Labour | Glyn Thomas | 954 | 23.5 | |
| Labour | Liam Cook | 937 | 23.1 | |
| Liberal Democrats | David Nowell | 578 | 14.3 | |
| Liberal Democrats | Matthew Harris | 549 | 13.5 | |
| Liberal Democrats | James Barton | 490 | 12.1 | |
| Green | Tim Riley | 478 | 11.8 | |
| Independent | Chris Johnson | 273 | 6.7 | |
| Turnout | | 4,055 | 37.6 | |
| Conservative win (new seat) | | | | |
| Conservative win (new seat) | | | | |
| Conservative win (new seat) | | | | |

=== Mill Hill ===
Mill Hill (3 seats)
| Party | Candidate | Votes | % | ±% |
|---|---|---|---|---|
| Liberal Democrats | Wayne Casey* | 2,434 | 60.2 | |
| Liberal Democrats | Jeremy Davies* | 2,344 | 57.9 | |
| Liberal Democrats | Sean Hooker* | 2,089 | 51.6 | |
| Conservative | John Hart | 1,081 | 26.7 | |
| Conservative | Paul Amsterdam | 1,061 | 26.2 | |
| Conservative | Sachin Rajput | 960 | 23.7 | |
| Labour | James Wragg | 460 | 11.4 | |
| Labour | Vinod Sodha | 453 | 11.2 | |
| Labour | Saira Hettiarachchi | 439 | 10.9 | |
| Green | Pablo De Mello | 256 | 6.3 | |
| Turnout | | 4,046 | 36.0 | |
| Liberal Democrats win (new seat) | | | | |
| Liberal Democrats win (new seat) | | | | |
| Liberal Democrats win (new seat) | | | | |

=== Oakleigh ===
Oakleigh (3 seats)
| Party | Candidate | Votes | % | ±% |
|---|---|---|---|---|
| Conservative | Brian Salinger* | 1,889 | 48.9 | |
| Conservative | Robert Newton | 1,860 | 48.1 | |
| Conservative | Gerard Silverstone | 1,828 | 47.3 | |
| Labour | Kathleen Levine | 1,234 | 31.9 | |
| Labour | David McNulty | 1,209 | 31.3 | |
| Labour | Ross Houston | 1,194 | 30.9 | |
| Liberal Democrats | Neil Ferguson | 565 | 14.6 | |
| Liberal Democrats | Yvonne Wicksteed | 528 | 13.7 | |
| Liberal Democrats | Brigid Povah | 456 | 11.8 | |
| Green | Angela Ryan | 335 | 8.7 | |
| Turnout | | 3,864 | 33.8 | |
| Conservative win (new seat) | | | | |
| Conservative win (new seat) | | | | |
| Conservative win (new seat) | | | | |

=== Totteridge ===
Totteridge (3 seats)
| Party | Candidate | Votes | % | ±% |
|---|---|---|---|---|
| Conservative | Brian Coleman* | 2,145 | 60.8 | |
| Conservative | Victor Lyon* | 2,120 | 60.1 | |
| Conservative | Kevin Edson* | 2,075 | 58.8 | |
| Labour | Marianne Haylett | 766 | 21.7 | |
| Labour | Jacques Astruc | 701 | 19.9 | |
| Labour | Robert Persad | 621 | 17.6 | |
| Liberal Democrats | Jennifer Keech | 497 | 14.1 | |
| Liberal Democrats | Victor Corney | 453 | 12.8 | |
| Liberal Democrats | David Smith | 430 | 12.2 | |
| Green | Brian Jacobs | 367 | 10.4 | |
| Turnout | | 3,529 | 34.3 | |
| Conservative win (new seat) | | | | |
| Conservative win (new seat) | | | | |
| Conservative win (new seat) | | | | |

=== Underhill ===
Underhill (3 seats)
| Party | Candidate | Votes | % | ±% |
|---|---|---|---|---|
| Conservative | Fiona Bulmer | 1,936 | 44.6 | |
| Labour | Anita Campbell* | 1,869 | 43.0 | |
| Conservative | Peter Davis | 1,850 | 42.6 | |
| Conservative | Joan Levinson | 1,780 | 41.0 | |
| Labour | Pauline Coakley-Webb* | 1,750 | 40.3 | |
| Labour | Chris Underwood | 1,604 | 36.9 | |
| Liberal Democrats | David Keech | 393 | 9.0 | |
| Liberal Democrats | Jonathan Davies | 370 | 8.5 | |
| Liberal Democrats | Michael Cole | 359 | 8.3 | |
| Green | Colin Newman | 331 | 7.6 | |
| Independent | James Crawford | 147 | 3.4 | |
| Independent | George Tranda | 103 | 2.4 | |
| Turnout | | 4,344 | 38.2 | |
| Conservative win (new seat) | | | | |
| Labour win (new seat) | | | | |
| Conservative win (new seat) | | | | |

=== West Finchley ===
West Finchley (3 seats)
| Party | Candidate | Votes | % | ±% |
|---|---|---|---|---|
| Labour | Kitty Lyons* | 1,795 | 47.6 | |
| Labour | Kath McGuirk* | 1,770 | 47.0 | |
| Labour | Jim Tierney* | 1,732 | 46.0 | |
| Conservative | Patrick Foley | 1,234 | 32.7 | |
| Conservative | Chris Kilmister | 1,188 | 31.5 | |
| Conservative | Syed Meer | 1,098 | 29.1 | |
| Liberal Democrats | Janice Turner | 502 | 13.3 | |
| Liberal Democrats | Malcolm Blount | 456 | 12.1 | |
| Green | Gustav Clarkson | 448 | 11.9 | |
| Liberal Democrats | Malcolm Davis | 433 | 11.5 | |
| Turnout | | 3,768 | 35.5 | |
| Labour win (new seat) | | | | |
| Labour win (new seat) | | | | |
| Labour win (new seat) | | | | |

=== West Hendon ===
Hendon West (3 seats)
| Party | Candidate | Votes | % | ±% |
|---|---|---|---|---|
| Labour | Arun Ghosh* | 1,614 | 51.9 | |
| Labour | Agnes Slocombe* | 1,561 | 50.2 | |
| Labour | Ansuya Sodha* | 1,431 | 46.0 | |
| Conservative | Asher Bornstein | 994 | 32.0 | |
| Conservative | Susan Lee | 932 | 30.0 | |
| Conservative | Michael Grenfell | 882 | 28.4 | |
| Liberal Democrats | Harry Levy | 388 | 12.5 | |
| Liberal Democrats | Richard Coward | 330 | 10.6 | |
| Liberal Democrats | Shirley Rodwell | 315 | 10.1 | |
| Green | Christine Antoniou | 228 | 7.3 | |
| Turnout | | 3,109 | 29.0 | |
| Labour win (new seat) | | | | |
| Labour win (new seat) | | | | |
| Labour win (new seat) | | | | |

=== Woodhouse ===
Woodhouse (3 seats)
| Party | Candidate | Votes | % | ±% |
|---|---|---|---|---|
| Labour | Anne Hutton | 1,953 | 47.2 | |
| Labour | Mark Langton | 1,935 | 46.8 | |
| Labour | Alan Schneiderman | 1,717 | 41.5 | |
| Conservative | Victor Kaye | 1,486 | 35.9 | |
| Conservative | Jolanta Broom | 1,483 | 35.9 | |
| Conservative | Satpal Chadha | 1,442 | 34.9 | |
| Liberal Democrats | Ian Murphy | 493 | 11.9 | |
| Green | Gardi Vaswani | 432 | 10.4 | |
| Liberal Democrats | Rita Druiff | 416 | 10.1 | |
| Liberal Democrats | Rita Landeryou | 411 | 9.9 | |
| Turnout | | 4,134 | 36.3 | |
| Labour win (new seat) | | | | |
| Labour win (new seat) | | | | |
| Labour win (new seat) | | | | |

== By-elections between 2002 and 2006 ==
=== Burnt Oak ===
Burnt Oak by-election, 19 June 2003
| Party | Candidate | Votes | % | ±% |
|---|---|---|---|---|
| Labour | Claire Farrier | 1,774 | 76.0 | +7.2 |
| Conservative | Sachin Rajput | 329 | 14.1 | −3.6 |
| Liberal Democrats | Diana Iwi | 178 | 7.6 | +1.6 |
| Green | Edelgard Vaswani | 53 | 2.3 | −5.8 |
| Majority | | 1,445 | 61.9 | |
| Turnout | | 2,334 | 23.2 | −1.1 |
| Labour hold | | Swing | | |

The by-election was called following the resignation of Cllr Alan Williams.

=== Hale ===
Hale by-election, 5 February 2004
| Party | Candidate | Votes | % | ±% |
|---|---|---|---|---|
| Labour | David Mencer | 1,329 | 43.7 | −0.3 |
| Conservative | Lesley Evans | 1,175 | 38.7 | +0.3 |
| Liberal Democrats | Clive Cohen | 423 | 13.9 | +3.3 |
| Green | David Williams | 113 | 3.7 | −2.4 |
| Majority | | 154 | 5.0 | |
| Turnout | | 3,040 | 26.6 | −9.9 |
| Labour hold | | Swing | | |

The by-election was called following the resignation of Cllr Ruth Nyman.

=== Colindale ===
Colindale by-election, 7 April 2005
| Party | Candidate | Votes | % | ±% |
|---|---|---|---|---|
| Labour | Zakia Zubairi | 1,154 | 63.4 | +6.0 |
| Conservative | Alan Maund | 299 | 16.4 | −1.3 |
| Liberal Democrats | Geoffrey Jacobs | 220 | 12.1 | +0.9 |
| Green | David Williams | 73 | 4.0 | −3.3 |
| UKIP | Melvyn Smallman | 45 | 2.5 | +2.5 |
| Independent | Mirsad Becirovic | 29 | 1.6 | +1.6 |
| Majority | | 855 | 47.0 | |
| Turnout | | 1,820 | 20.1 | −0.6 |
| Labour hold | | Swing | | |

The by-election was called following the disqualification of Cllr Alan Sloam.

=== Garden Suburb ===
Garden Suburb by-election, 5 May 2005
| Party | Candidate | Votes | % | ±% |
|---|---|---|---|---|
| Conservative | Andrew Harper | 3,365 | 50.7 | +3.4 |
| Liberal Democrats | Marjorie Harris | 1,834 | 27.6 | −5.6 |
| Labour | Kenneth Murrell | 1,154 | 17.4 | +3.8 |
| Green | Miranda Dunn | 242 | 3.6 | −4.1 |
| UKIP | Primrose Chamberlin | 42 | 0.6 | +0.6 |
| Majority | | 1,531 | 23.1 | |
| Turnout | | 6,637 | 66.9 | +28.1 |
| Conservative hold | | Swing | | |

The by-election was called following the resignation of Cllr Vanessa Gearson.

=== High Barnet ===
High Barnet by-election, 15 December 2005
| Party | Candidate | Votes | % | ±% |
|---|---|---|---|---|
| Liberal Democrats | Duncan Macdonald | 1,409 | 44.4 | +30.1 |
| Conservative | Bridget Perry | 1,295 | 40.8 | −8.3 |
| Labour | Timothy Roberts | 354 | 11.2 | −14.8 |
| Green | Audrey Poppy | 89 | 2.8 | −9.0 |
| Independent | Christopher Johnson | 26 | 0.7 | −6.0 |
| Majority | | 114 | 3.6 | |
| Turnout | | 3,173 | 30.4 | |
| Liberal Democrats gain from Conservative | | Swing | | |

The by-election was called following the resignation of Cllr Kantilal Patel in October 2005. It was only the third time in the council's history that a seat had changed hands in a by-election.
