= Hendon (ward) =

Electoral ward in the London Borough of Barnet

- Electoral ward for the Barnet London Borough Council
- Hendon ward boundaries since 2022
- Borough: Barnet
- County: Greater London
- Population: 21,981 (2021) (Note: 2021 Census data reported for 2022 ward boundaries)
- Electorate: 13,484 (2022)
- Major settlements: Hendon
- Area: 3.367 square kilometres (1.300 sq mi)

Current electoral ward
- Created: 1968
- Number of members: 3
- Councillors: Mark Shooter; Alex Prager; Shimon Ryde
- GSS code: E05013643

Hendon is an electoral ward in the London Borough of Barnet. The ward was first used in the 1968 elections. It returns three councillors to Barnet London Borough Council.

== List of councillors ==
Term	Councillor	Party
1968–1978	John Gordon-Lee	Conservative
1968–1990	Norman Hirshfield	Conservative
1968–1986	Victor Hockley	Conservative
1978–1986	John Archard-Jones	Conservative
1986–1990	Peter Grosz	Conservative
1986–1998	Frederick Poole	Conservative
1990–2022	Anthony Finn	Conservative
1990–1996	Edward Bunn	Conservative
1996–2002	Andrew Sherling	Conservative
1998–2018	Maureen Braun	Conservative
2002–2010	Matthew Offord	Conservative
2010–present	Mark Shooter (Note: Mark Shooter changed parties in 2024.)	Conservative
2010–present	Mark Shooter	Reform
2018–2022	Nizza Fluss	Conservative
2022–2025	Joshua Conway	Conservative
2022–present	Alex Prager	Conservative
2025–present	Shimon Ryde	Conservative

== Barnet council elections since 2022 ==
There was a revision of ward boundaries in Barnet in 2022.

=== 2025 by-election ===
The by-election took place on 30 October 2025, following the disqualification of Joshua Conway.

2025 Hendon by-election
Party	Candidate	Votes	%	±%
Conservative	Shimon Ryde	1,656	46.8	−2.5
Reform	Yosef David	1,069	30.2	New
Labour	Lewis Harrison	423	12.0	−14.8
Green	Gabrielle Bailey	201	5.7	−2.4
Liberal Democrats	Jeremy Walsh	107	3.0	−2.2
Rejoin EU	Ben Rend	81	2.3	New
Turnout			25.2	
Conservative hold		Swing		

=== 2022 election ===
The election took place on 5 May 2022.

2022 Barnet London Borough Council election: Hendon
Party	Candidate	Votes	%	±%
Conservative	Joshua Conway	2,632	57.0	
Conservative	Alex Prager	2,545	55.1	
Conservative	Mark Shooter	2,436	52.7	
Labour	Charlotte Daus	1,427	30.9	
Labour	David Dunitz	1,329	28.8	
Labour	Viljo Wilding	1,018	22.0	
Independent	Franca Oliffe	568	12.3	
Green	Christopher Fordyce	429	9.3	
Liberal Democrats	Michael Hughes	277	6.0	
Liberal Democrats	Janice Turner	276	6.0	
Liberal Democrats	Eunice Phillips	240	5.2	
Turnout		4,620	34.3	
Conservative win (new boundaries)				
Conservative win (new boundaries)				
Conservative win (new boundaries)				

== 2002–2022 Barnet council elections ==
Hendon ward boundaries from 2002 to 2022

There was a revision of ward boundaries in Barnet in 2002.

=== 2018 election ===
The election took place on 3 May 2018.

2018 Barnet London Borough Council election: Hendon
Party	Candidate	Votes	%	±%
Conservative	Anthony Finn	3,002	62.6	+11.6
Conservative	Mark Shooter	2,950	61.6	+11.5
Conservative	Nizza Fluss	2,892	60.4	+12.1
Labour	Jenny Brown	1,217	25.4	−3.2
Labour	Andreas Ioannidis	1,192	24.9	−3.0
Labour	David Beere	1,185	24.7	−2.0
Green	Carmen Legarda	316	6.6	−2.8
Liberal Democrats	Jason Moleman	271	5.7	−1.0
Liberal Democrats	Henryk Feszczur	252	5.3	−0.5
Liberal Democrats	Klevis Krasniqi	163	3.4	−0.9
Duma Polska	Malgorzata Zajaczkowska	130	2.7	N/A
Turnout		4,792	40.9	
Conservative hold		Swing		
Conservative hold		Swing		
Conservative hold		Swing		

=== 2014 election ===
The election took place on 22 May 2014.

2014 Barnet London Borough Council election: Hendon
Party	Candidate	Votes	%	±%
Conservative	Anthony Finn	2,128	51.0	−0.6
Conservative	Mark Shooter	2,087	50.1	−1.8
Conservative	Maureen Braun	2,015	48.3	+0.2
Labour	David Beere	1,191	28.6	+3.4
Labour	Gerrard Roots	1,165	27.9	+1.8
Labour	Ruth Montague	1,113	26.7	+1.8
UKIP	Barry Ryan	420	10.1	N/A
Green	Andy Monaghan	390	9.4	+4.5
Liberal Democrats	Jason Moleman	280	6.7	−5.7
Liberal Democrats	Henryk Feszczur	243	5.8	−7.7
Liberal Democrats	Charles Wakefield	180	4.3	−7.5
Total votes		4,169		
Conservative hold		Swing		
Conservative hold		Swing		
Conservative hold		Swing		

=== 2010 election ===
The election on 6 May 2010 took place on the same day as the United Kingdom general election.

2010 Barnet London Borough Council election: Hendon
Party	Candidate	Votes	%	±%
Conservative	Mark Shooter	3,366	51.9	−0.7
Conservative	Anthony Finn	3,345	51.6	−3.7
Conservative	Maureen Braun	3,115	48.1	−5.2
Labour	Linda Attwood	1,692	26.1	+9.8
Labour	David Beere	1,636	25.2	+10.4
Labour	Pierre Jeanmaire	1,612	24.9	+7.3
Liberal Democrats	Jonathan Davies	874	13.5	−10.0
Liberal Democrats	Jason Moleman	804	12.4	−9.4
Liberal Democrats	Anoushka Fernandes-Vidal	765	11.8	−8.8
Green	Manisha Abeyasinghe	319	4.9	N/A
Green	Jennifer Goodman	313	4.8	N/A
Green	Pablo de Mello	230	3.5	−4.0
Turnout		6,482	57.0	+22.4
Conservative hold		Swing		
Conservative hold		Swing		
Conservative hold		Swing		

=== 2006 election ===
The election took place on 4 May 2006.

2006 Barnet London Borough Council election: Hendon
Party	Candidate	Votes	%	±%
Conservative	Anthony Finn	2,011	55.3	+10.2
Conservative	Maureen Braun	1,937	53.3	+11.0
Conservative	Matthew Offord	1,914	52.6	+14.5
Liberal Democrats	Peter Greenhill	855	23.5	−8.3
Liberal Democrats	Stieve De Lance	793	21.8	−8.9
Liberal Democrats	Honora Morrissey	749	20.6	−8.8
Labour	Pierre Jeanmarie	641	17.6	−5.8
Labour	Ruth Montague	594	16.3	−2.6
Labour	Nitin Parekh	538	14.8	−3.9
Green	Pablo De Mello	271	7.5	+1.6
Turnout		3,636	34.6	+4.1
Conservative hold		Swing		
Conservative hold		Swing		
Conservative hold		Swing		

=== 2002 election ===
The election took place on 2 May 2002.

2002 Barnet London Borough Council election: Hendon
Party	Candidate	Votes	%	±%
Conservative	Anthony Finn	1,591	45.1	
Conservative	Maureen Braun	1,492	42.3	
Conservative	Matthew Offord	1,345	38.1	
Liberal Democrats	Jason Moleman	1,122	31.8	
Liberal Democrats	Michael Green	1,084	30.7	
Liberal Democrats	Steven Deller	1,039	29.4	
Labour	Aubrey Ross	827	23.4	
Labour	Anthony Boulton	668	18.9	
Labour	Doreen Neall	662	18.7	
Green	Georgia Theodorou	207	5.9	
Turnout		3,531	30.5	
Conservative win (new boundaries)				
Conservative win (new boundaries)				
Conservative win (new boundaries)				

== 1978–2002 Barnet council elections ==
Hendon ward boundaries from 1978 to 2002

There was a revision of ward boundaries in Barnet in 1978.

=== 1998 election ===
The election took place on 7 May 1998.

1998 Barnet London Borough Council election: Hendon
Party	Candidate	Votes	%	±%
Conservative	Anthony Finn	1,487	37.08	▼6.29
Conservative	Maureen Braun	1,349		
Conservative	Andrew Sherling	1,293		
Liberal Democrats	Susan Palin	1,226	30.24	▲11.99
Liberal Democrats	Jonathan Davies	1,164		
Labour	Aubrey Ross	1,105	27.29	▼3.61
Labour	Francis Deutsch	1,022		
Liberal Democrats	Sean Hooker	977		
Labour	Margaret Onokah	912		
Green	Georgia Theodorou	200	5.39	▼2.09
Registered electors		12,279		▲1,096
Turnout		3,867	31.49	▼8.58
Rejected ballots		10	0.26	▼0.52
Conservative hold		Swing		
Conservative hold		Swing		
Conservative hold		Swing		

=== 1996 by-election ===
The by-election took place on 14 November 1996, following the resignation of Edward Bunn.

1996 Hendon by-election
Party	Candidate	Votes	%	±%
Conservative	Andrew Sherling	970	36.2	
Labour	Colin Francome	885	33.1	
Liberal Democrats	Susan Palin	821	30.7	
Majority		85	3.1	
Turnout		2,676	22.7	
Conservative hold		Swing		

=== 1994 election ===
The election took place on 5 May 1994.

1994 Barnet London Borough Council election: Hendon
Party	Candidate	Votes	%	±%
Conservative	Anthony Finn	2,036	43.37	▼14.82
Conservative	Frederick Poole	1,823		
Conservative	Edward Bunn	1,791		
Labour	Colin Francombe	1,464	30.90	▼1.13
Labour	David Simons	1,302		
Labour	Alan Killingback	1,260		
Liberal Democrats	Fiona Palmer	852	18.25	▲8.47
Liberal Democrats	Harold Defries	825		
Liberal Democrats	Martin Rodwell	700		
Green	Graham White	325	7.48	New
Registered electors		11,183		▲461
Turnout		4,481	40.07	▼7.08
Rejected ballots		35	0.78	▲0.60
Conservative hold		Swing		
Conservative hold		Swing		
Conservative hold		Swing		

=== 1990 election ===
The election took place on 3 May 1990.

1990 Barnet London Borough Council election: Hendon
Party	Candidate	Votes	%	±%
Conservative	Anthony Finn	2,789	58.19	
Conservative	Edward Bunn	2,692		
Conservative	Frederick Poole	2,641		
Labour	Francis Deutsch	1,520	32.03	
Labour	Colin Francombe	1,518		
Labour	Bryan Reith	1,432		
Liberal Democrats	Joan Beales	491	9.78	
Liberal Democrats	Richard Coward	454		
Liberal Democrats	David Ive	419		
Registered electors		10,722		
Turnout		5055	47.15	
Rejected ballots		9	0.18	
Conservative hold		Swing		
Conservative hold		Swing		
Conservative hold		Swing		

=== 1986 election ===
The election took place on 8 May 1986.

1986 Barnet London Borough Council election: Hendon
Party	Candidate	Votes	%	±%
Conservative	Norman Hirshfield	1,932		
Conservative	Peter Grosz	1,804		
Conservative	Frederick Poole	1,749		
Labour	Barbara Condon	1,172		
Labour	Martin Earl	1,151		
Alliance	Douglas Baron	1,140		
Alliance	Alan Magnus	1,127		
Labour	Bryan Reith	1,065		
Alliance	David Warner	1,024		
Turnout				
Conservative hold		Swing		
Conservative hold		Swing		
Conservative hold		Swing		

=== 1982 election ===
The election took place on 6 May 1982.

1982 Barnet London Borough Council election: Hendon
Party	Candidate	Votes	%	±%
Conservative	Norman Hirshfield	2,184		
Conservative	Victor Hockley	2,125		
Conservative	John Archard-Jones	1,872		
Alliance	Anne Godfrey	1,316		
Alliance	Harold Defries	1,278		
Alliance	Alan Magnus	1,276		
Labour	Barrie Brown	1,000		
Labour	Mary McShane	945		
Labour	Martin Earl	937		
Turnout				
Conservative hold		Swing		
Conservative hold		Swing		
Conservative hold		Swing		

=== 1978 election ===
The election took place on 4 May 1978.

1978 Barnet London Borough Council election: Hendon
Party	Candidate	Votes	%	±%
Conservative	Norman Hirshfield	2,954		
Conservative	Victor Hockley	2,784		
Conservative	John Archard-Jones	2,564		
Labour	Celia Downs	1,246		
Labour	Christopher Jacobs	1,216		
Labour	Alan Magnus	1,188		
Liberal	Gerald Finlay	478		
Liberal	Peter Kempster	355		
Liberal	Elvin Sorkin	337		
Turnout			40.3	
Conservative win (new boundaries)				
Conservative win (new boundaries)				
Conservative win (new boundaries)				

== 1968–1978 Barnet council elections ==
There was a revision of ward boundaries in Barnet in 1968.

=== 1974 election ===
The election took place on 2 May 1974.

1974 Barnet London Borough Council election: Hendon
Party	Candidate	Votes	%	±%
Conservative	John Gordon-Lee	2,084		
Conservative	Norman Hirshfield	2,019		
Conservative	Victor Hockley	1,965		
Labour	A. Magnus	1,369		
Labour	D. Neall	1,332		
Labour	C. Jacobs	1,327		
Liberal	Anne Godfrey	968		
Liberal	I. Scott	932		
Liberal	A. Gilbey	896		
Turnout			40.0	
Conservative hold		Swing		
Conservative hold		Swing		
Conservative hold		Swing		

=== 1971 election ===
The election took place on 13 May 1971.

1971 Barnet London Borough Council election: Hendon
Party	Candidate	Votes	%	±%
Conservative	John Gordon-Lee	2,553		
Conservative	Norman Hirshfield	2,318		
Conservative	Victor Hockley	2,249		
Labour	L. Dinnie	1,532		
Labour	M. Lewis	1,524		
Labour	D. Ramage	1,446		
Liberal	D. Baron	1,103		
Liberal	Anne Godfrey	984		
Liberal	A. Gower	902		
Turnout			38.9	
Conservative hold		Swing		
Conservative hold		Swing		
Conservative hold		Swing		

=== 1968 election ===
The election took place on 9 May 1968.

1968 Barnet London Borough Council election: Hendon
Party	Candidate	Votes	%	±%
Conservative	John Gordon-Lee	3,078	57.0	
Conservative	Norman Hirshfield	3,035		
Conservative	Victor Hockley	2,986		
Liberal	Anne Godfrey	1,682	31.1	
Liberal	Peter Billenness	1,644		
Liberal	D. Griffiths	1,644		
Labour	H. Fleet	669	11.9	
Labour	M. Tyler	618		
Labour	R. Jackson	609		
Turnout			45.7	
Conservative win (new seat)				
Conservative win (new seat)				
Conservative win (new seat)				
