= Stepanenko =

Stepanenko (Ukrainian or Russian: Степаненко) is a gender-neutral Ukrainian surname. Notable people with the surname include:

- Anatoly Stepanenko (born 1949), Soviet cyclist
- Ekaterina Stepanenko (born 1983), Russian football player
- Eugene Stepanenko (born 1974), Ukrainian director
- Galina Stepanenko (born 1966), Russian ballerina
- Ivan Stepanenko (1920–2007), Soviet-Ukrainian flying ace
- Ivan Stepanenko (ice hockey), (born 1995), Kazakhstani ice hockey player
- Julija Stepanenko (born 1977), Latvian politician
- Nikolay Stepanenko (born 1956), Soviet-Belarusian sprint canoeist
- Oleg Stepanenko (born 1939), Soviet-Ukrainian hurdler
- Sergei Stepanenko (born 1981), Kazakh/Russian footballer
- Stepan Stepanenko, British political analyst and archaeologist
- Taras Stepanenko (born 1989), Ukrainian football player
- Vjačeslavs Stepaņenko (born 1959), Latvian politician
- Yelena Stepanenko (born 1953), Russian actress
