= Brunswick Park (Barnet ward) =

Electoral ward in Barnet, London, England

- Electoral ward for the Barnet London Borough Council
- Borough: Barnet
- County: Greater London
- Population: 16,211 (2021)
- Area: 3.048 km²

Current electoral ward
- Created: 1965
- Councillors: 3

Brunswick Park is an electoral ward in the London Borough of Barnet. The ward was first used in the 1964 elections. It elects three councillors to Barnet London Borough Council.

== Geography ==
The ward is named after the suburb of Brunswick Park.

== Councillors ==
Election	Councillors		
2022	Paul Lemon (Labour)	Giulia Monasterio (Labour)	Tony Vourou (Labour)

== Elections ==
=== 2022 Barnet London Borough Council election ===
Brunswick Park (3 seats)
Party	Candidate	Votes	%	±%
Labour	Giulia Monasterio	2,381	49.7	
Labour	Paul Lemon	2,353	49.1	
Labour	Tony Vourou	2,193	45.8	
Conservative	Lisa Rutter*	1,918	40.0	
Conservative	Nicole Richer*	1,829	38.2	
Conservative	Josh Mastin-Lee	1,805	37.7	
Green	David Farbey	524	10.9	
Liberal Democrats	Luigi Bille	321	6.7	
Liberal Democrats	Glyn Williams	262	5.5	
Liberal Democrats	Jonty Stern	247	5.2	
Turnout		4,791	41.4	
Labour win (new boundaries)				
Labour win (new boundaries)				
Labour win (new boundaries)				

=== 2018 Barnet London Borough Council election ===
Brunswick Park
Party	Candidate	Votes	%	±%
Conservative	Roberto Weeden-Sanz	2,586	46.9	+7.6
Conservative	Lisa Rutter*	2,517	45.7	+5.9
Labour	Kathy Levine*	2,369	43.0	+2.1
Conservative	Mukesh Depala	2,362	42.9	+6.4
Labour	Andy Palmer	2,293	41.6	+0.9
Labour	Clement Magoba	2,184	39.6	+1.5
Green	David Farbey	443	8.0	−2.4
Liberal Democrats	Clareine Enderby	321	5.8	+0.1
Liberal Democrats	Michael Hughes	263	4.8	+0.2
Liberal Democrats	Roy Seger	221	4.0	+0.5
Turnout		5,511	45.5	
Conservative gain from Labour		Swing		
Conservative hold		Swing		
Labour hold		Swing		

=== 2014 Barnet London Borough Council election ===
Brunswick Park (3 seats)
Party	Candidate	Votes	%	±%
Labour	Kathy Levine	1,951	40.9	+14.2
Labour	Andreas Ioannidis*	1,944	40.7	+14.8
Conservative	Lisa Rutter*	1,899	39.8	−5.1
Conservative	Andreas Tambourides*	1,876	39.3	−7.5
Labour	James Rowe	1,820	38.1	+14.6
Conservative	Antonis Savvides	1,742	36.5	−7.8
Green	Howard Javes	499	10.4	+4.9
Liberal Democrats	Sandra Beeton	270	5.7	−11.6
Liberal Democrats	Jennifer Ritson	218	4.6	−11.7
Liberal Democrats	Sakura Otten	168	3.5	−10.8
Total votes		4,776		
Labour gain from Conservative		Swing		
Labour hold		Swing		
Conservative hold		Swing		

=== 2010 Barnet London Borough Council election ===
Brunswick Park (3 seats)
Party	Candidate	Votes	%	±%
Conservative	Andreas Tambourides*	3,496	46.8	−14.4
Conservative	Lisa Rutter*	3,353	44.9	−14.3
Conservative	Lynne Hillan*	3,307	44.3	−19.2
Labour	Marianne Haylett	1,994	26.7	+11.4
Labour	Lawrence Williams	1,937	25.9	+12.2
Labour	Clement Magoba	1,758	23.5	+10.0
Liberal Democrats	Charles Wicksteed	1,289	17.3	+3.4
Liberal Democrats	Eileen Umbo	1,217	16.3	+3.2
Liberal Democrats	Gabrielle Wong	1,066	14.3	+2.7
Green	Ashley Bond	548	7.3	−2.3
Green	Murat Gurses	431	5.8	N/A
Green	Howard Javes	409	5.5	N/A
Turnout		7,468	65.0	+22.4
Conservative hold		Swing		
Conservative hold		Swing		
Conservative hold		Swing		

=== 2006 Barnet London Borough Council election ===
Brunswick Park (3 seats)
Party	Candidate	Votes	%	±%
Conservative	Lynne Hillan*	2,827	63.5	+13.2
Conservative	Andreas Tambourides*	2,722	61.2	+10.6
Conservative	Lisa Rutter	2,636	59.2	+8.8
Labour	Mary Groom	680	15.3	−20.8
Liberal Democrats	Peter Finlayson	618	13.9	+3.6
Labour	Francis McGrath	609	13.7	−19.5
Labour	Robert Persad	600	13.5	−19.5
Liberal Democrats	Elliot Davis	584	13.1	+3.3
Liberal Democrats	Filiz Mustafa	515	11.6	+4.4
Green	Lee Povey	427	9.6	+3.9
UKIP	Martyn Eade	246	5.5	N/A
UKIP	Primrose Chamberlin	224	5.0	N/A
UKIP	Richard Roper	213	4.8	N/A
Turnout		4,449	42.6	+1.8
Conservative hold		Swing		
Conservative hold		Swing		
Conservative hold		Swing		

=== 2002 Barnet London Borough Council election ===
Brunswick Park (3 seats)
Party	Candidate	Votes	%	±%
Conservative	Andreas Tambourides*	2,278	50.6	
Conservative	Daniel Hope	2,269	50.4	
Conservative	Lynne Hillan*	2,267	50.3	
Labour	Geoffrey Cooke*	1,627	36.1	
Labour	Antonakis Vourou	1,494	33.2	
Labour	Kelly Tebb	1,488	33.0	
Liberal Democrats	Peter Finlayson	463	10.3	
Liberal Democrats	Margaret Neil	443	9.8	
Liberal Democrats	Charles Wicksteed	323	7.2	
Green	Dennis Vigay	257	5.7	
Turnout		4,506	40.8	
Conservative win (new seat)				
Conservative win (new seat)				
Conservative win (new seat)				

=== 1998 Barnet London Borough Council election ===
Brunswick Park (3)
Party	Candidate	Votes	%	±%
Labour	Geoffrey N. Cooke	1,826	44.99	▲8.23
Conservative	Andreas Tambourides	1,781	44.92	▼0.59
Conservative	Lynne Hillan	1,774		
Labour	Paul G. Rogers	1,700		
Labour	Michael J.P. Marshall	1,689		
Conservative	Arik Yacobi	1,653		
Liberal Democrats	Peter J. Finlayson	446	10.09	▼7.64
Liberal Democrats	Peter D. Watkins	383		
Liberal Democrats	Charles E. Wicksteed	341		
Registered electors		10,854		▲503
Turnout		4,164	38.36	▼4.47
Rejected ballots		11	0.26	▼0.10
Labour gain from Conservative				
Conservative hold				
Conservative hold				

=== 1994 Barnet London Borough Council election ===
Brunswick Park (3)
Party	Candidate	Votes	%	±%
Conservative	Donald R. Goodman*	1,985	45.51	▼10.53
Conservative	Irene R. Palmer*	1,834		
Conservative	John D. Rawles*	1,817		
Labour	Jeffrey G. Cohen	1,576	36.76	▲3.76
Labour	Bridget J. Griffin	1,505		
Labour	Ian Wallace	1,472		
Liberal Democrats	Peter J. Finlayson	785	17.73	▲6.77
Liberal Democrats	Alwena M. Lillywhite	723		
Liberal Democrats	Yvonne Wicksteed	688		
Registered electors		10,351		▼229
Turnout		4,433	42.83	▼3.61
Rejected ballots		16	0.36	▲0.18
Conservative hold				
Conservative hold				
Conservative hold				

=== 1990 Barnet London Borough Council election ===
Brunswick Park (3)
Party	Candidate	Votes	%
Conservative	Donald Goodman*	2,643	56.04
Conservative	Irene Palmer*	2,507	
Conservative	John Rawles*	2,489	
Labour	David Bloyce	1,568	33.00
Labour	Rita Brent	1,471	
Labour	Janet Heathfield	1,458	
Liberal Democrats	Alwena Lillywhite	509	10.96
Liberal Democrats	Peter Watkins	503	
Liberal Democrats	Andrew Hydon	483	
Registered electors		10,580	
Turnout		4913	46.44
Rejected ballots		9	0.18
Conservative hold			
Conservative hold			
Conservative hold			

=== 1964 Barnet London Borough Council election ===
Brunswick Park (1 seat)
Party	Candidate	Votes	%	±%
Labour	M. B. Passingham	1,145		
Liberal	E. L. Knight	948		
Conservative	B. Gibbs	883		
Turnout		2,983	60.2	
Labour win (new seat)				
