= 2018 Barnet London Borough Council election =

2018 local election in England

- 3 May 2018

All 63 seats to Barnet London Borough Council 32 seats needed for a majority

	First party	Second party
Leader	Richard Cornelius	Barry Rawlings
Party	Conservative	Labour
Leader's seat	Totteridge	Coppetts
Last election	32 seats, 38.6%	30 seats, 36.4%
Seats won	38	25
Seat change	▲6	▼5
Popular vote	50,340	44,159
Percentage	44.5%	39.0%
Swing	▲5.9%	▲2.7%
- Map of the results of the 2018 Barnet London Borough council election. Conservatives in blue and Labour in red.
Council control before election
No overall control
Council control after election
Conservative

The 2018 Barnet Borough Council election took place on 3 May 2018 to elect members of Barnet Borough Council in London, England. It took place on the same day as other local elections in 2018. In the last election, the Conservatives won control of the council with 32 seats, compared to 30 for Labour and 1 for the Liberal Democrats. On 15 March 2018, following the resignation of a Conservative councillor, the council was in a state of no overall control. The election on 3 May 2018 saw the Conservatives take back overall control with a majority of 13.

On 20 September 2019 Gabriel Rozenberg (elected Conservative) joined the Liberal Democrats, citing his opposition to Brexit. On 2 October, he was then followed by Jess Brayne (elected Labour) who also defected to the Liberal Democrats.

== Background ==
At the last election in 2014, the Conservatives were re-elected with a reduced majority. Labour gained 9 seats from the Conservatives, but the Conservatives remained in office as a result of winning 2 seats from the Liberal Democrats in Childs Hill ward.

The Conservatives remained in control of the council with 32 seats until March 2018, when councillor Sury Khatri resigned his membership and role as party whip after being deselected as a Conservative candidate. As a result, the Conservatives lost their majority on the council, leaving them as a minority administration.

== Election results ==
Incumbent councillors are marked with an asterisk *.

Barnet local election result 2018
Party	Seats	Gains	Losses	Net gain/loss	Seats %	Votes %	Votes	+/−
Conservative	38	6	0	+6	60.3	44.5	50,340	+5.9
Labour	25	1	6	-5	39.7	39.0	44,159	+2.7
Liberal Democrats	0	0	1	-1	0.0	9.2	10,415	+1.1
Green	0	0	0	0	0.0	6.3	7,078	-4.6
Independent	0	0	0	0	0.0	0.4	471	-0.9
UKIP	0	0	0	0	0.0	0.1	122	-2.2
Others	0	0	0	0	0.0	0.6	627	+0.4

== Council composition ==
Prior to the election, the composition of the council was:

↓
31	30	1	1
Conservative	Labour

After the election, the composition of the council was:

↓
38	25
Conservative	Labour

== Results by ward ==
=== Brunswick Park ===
Brunswick Park
Party	Candidate	Votes	%	±%
Conservative	Roberto Weeden-Sanz	2,586	46.9	+7.6
Conservative	Lisa Rutter*	2,517	45.7	+5.9
Labour	Kathy Levine*	2,369	43.0	+2.1
Conservative	Mukesh Depala	2,362	42.9	+6.4
Labour	Andy Palmer	2,293	41.6	+0.9
Labour	Clement Magoba	2,184	39.6	+1.5
Green	David Farbey	443	8.0	−2.4
Liberal Democrats	Clareine Enderby	321	5.8	+0.1
Liberal Democrats	Michael Hughes	263	4.8	+0.2
Liberal Democrats	Roy Seger	221	4.0	+0.5
Turnout		5,511	45.5	
Conservative gain from Labour		Swing		
Conservative hold		Swing		
Labour hold		Swing		

=== Burnt Oak ===
Burnt Oak
Party	Candidate	Votes	%	±%
Labour	Sara Conway	2,440	63.3	−0.5
Labour	Charlie O'Macauley*	2,321	60.2	+6.1
Labour	Ammar Naqvi*	2,320	60.2	+7.2
Conservative	Jack Aaron	985	25.6	+4.0
Conservative	Nicole Richer	892	23.1	+2.3
Conservative	Ekaterina Dragomirova	755	19.6	+3.8
Green	Ben Samuel	364	9.4	−1.5
Liberal Democrats	Robin Marks	253	6.6	−0.4
Liberal Democrats	Millicent Watkins	187	4.9	−1.0
Liberal Democrats	Mosa Zahed	129	3.3	−0.4
Turnout		3,854	32.6	
Labour hold		Swing		
Labour hold		Swing		
Labour hold		Swing		

=== Childs Hill ===
Childs Hill
Party	Candidate	Votes	%	±%
Conservative	Shimon Ryde*	2,262	39.4	+6.6
Conservative	Peter Zinkin*	2,243	39.0	+6.4
Labour	Anne Clarke	2,224	38.7	+7.7
Conservative	Vanessa Gearson	2,222	38.7	+5.9
Labour	Lisa Pate	2,080	36.2	+6.3
Labour	Nigel Young	1,877	32.7	+3.4
Liberal Democrats	Jack Cohen*	1,279	22.3	−9.7
Liberal Democrats	Susette Palmer	1,126	19.6	−6.3
Liberal Democrats	Sachin Patel	876	15.3	−10.1
Green	Jemma Ferguson	406	7.1	−3.5
Turnout		5,744	44.7	
Conservative hold		Swing		
Conservative hold		Swing		
Labour gain from Liberal Democrats		Swing		

=== Colindale ===
Colindale
Party	Candidate	Votes	%	±%
Labour	Nagus Narenthira*	3,121	68.8	+0.4
Labour	Gill Sargeant*	2,912	64.2	−1.0
Labour	Zakia Zubairi*	2,831	62.4	−0.5
Conservative	Jethro Ezimako	1,005	22.2	+6.6
Conservative	Anshul Gupta	879	19.4	+4.9
Conservative	Sabah Mnili	818	18.0	+4.9
Liberal Democrats	Nicola Hargreaves	415	9.2	+5.0
Liberal Democrats	Christian Matenaers	375	8.3	+5.5
Liberal Democrats	Mubin Mukadam	222	4.9	+2.2
Turnout		4,534	31.4	
Labour hold		Swing		
Labour hold		Swing		
Labour hold		Swing		

=== Coppetts ===
Coppetts
Party	Candidate	Votes	%	±%
Labour	Reema Patel*	2,793	58.6	+10.7
Labour	Barry Rawlings*	2,778	58.3	+12.1
Labour	Pauline Webb*	2,767	58.1	+11.4
Conservative	Daniel Cohen	1,358	28.5	−3.7
Conservative	Luke Stewart	1,300	27.3	−1.4
Conservative	Anila Skeja	1,247	26.2	−0.9
Liberal Democrats	Julia Hughes	493	10.3	+5.7
Liberal Democrats	Alexander Ollier	401	8.4	+4.2
Liberal Democrats	Melvyn Rees	381	8.0	+4.8
Turnout		4,765	40.0	
Labour hold		Swing		
Labour hold		Swing		
Labour hold		Swing		

=== East Barnet ===
East Barnet
Party	Candidate	Votes	%	±%
Labour	Jo Cooper	2,509	45.2	+2.1
Labour	Laurie Williams*	2,509	45.2	+3.4
Conservative	Felix Byers	2,429	43.8	+5.1
Labour	Philip Cohen*	2,399	43.2	+2.5
Conservative	Anne-Marie Pearce**	2,365	42.6	+4.3
Conservative	Pavan Pavanakumar	2,310	41.6	+4.4
Green	Margaret Curati	498	9.0	−4.0
Liberal Democrats	Jon Finlayson	339	6.1	+2.1
Liberal Democrats	David Bullen	323	5.8	+2.2
Liberal Democrats	Sean Hooker	302	5.4	+1.9
Turnout		5,552	47.1	
Labour hold		Swing		
Labour hold		Swing		
Conservative gain from Labour		Swing		

Pearce was a councillor for Cockfosters ward in the London Borough of Enfield prior to the election.

=== East Finchley ===
East Finchley
Party	Candidate	Votes	%	±%
Labour	Arjun Mittra*	3,158	60.5	+6.1
Labour	Claire Farrier**	3,151	60.3	+13.6
Labour	Alison Moore*	3,094	59.2	+1.7
Conservative	Lucy Marks	1,176	22.5	+1.0
Conservative	James McKinley	1,123	21.5	+0.6
Conservative	Adam Gheasuddin	1,073	20.5	−0.4
Liberal Democrats	Joyce Arram	545	10.4	+1.7
Green	Noel Lynch	416	8.0	−5.6
Liberal Democrats	Diana Iwi	377	7.2	+0.6
Liberal Democrats	Jonty Stern	351	6.7	+1.4
Green	Stephen Norman	313	6.0	−6.8
Green	David Mellows	287	5.5	−7.3
Turnout		5,224	45.4	
Labour hold		Swing		
Labour hold		Swing		
Labour hold		Swing		

Farrier was a councillor for Burnt Oak ward prior to the election.

=== Edgware ===
Edgware
Party	Candidate	Votes	%	±%
Conservative	Brian Gordon*	3,567	68.3	+7.3
Conservative	Linda Freedman	3,370	64.6	+11.7
Conservative	Sarah Wardle	3,289	63.0	+14.3
Labour	Andrea Bilbow	1,311	25.1	−1.3
Labour	Amir Khnifess	1,077	20.6	−5.2
Labour	Jordan Scammell	1,019	19.5	−6.0
Green	Kunal Dhanani-Sumaria	407	7.8	−2.8
Liberal Democrats	Stephen Barber	273	5.2	−4.8
Liberal Democrats	Maria Manalo	268	5.1	−4.1
Liberal Democrats	Jose-Angel Tijera	252	4.8	+1.0
Turnout		5,219	44.1	
Conservative hold		Swing		
Conservative hold		Swing		
Conservative hold		Swing		

=== Finchley Church End ===
Finchley Church End
Party	Candidate	Votes	%	±%
Conservative	Eva Greenspan*	3,429	64.9	+8.5
Conservative	Jennifer Grocock	3,192	60.5	+10.4
Conservative	Dan Thomas*	3,050	57.8	+9.6
Labour	Karen Walkden	1,200	22.7	−4.9
Labour	Debs Heneghan	1,161	22.0	−4.4
Labour	Joel Salmon	1,141	21.6	−4.6
Liberal Democrats	Rita Landeryou	636	12.0	+5.3
Liberal Democrats	Frank Jackman	580	11.0	+5.1
Liberal Democrats	Charles Wakefield	517	9.8	+4.9
Turnout		5,280	46.9	
Conservative hold		Swing		
Conservative hold		Swing		
Conservative hold		Swing		

=== Garden Suburb ===
On September 20, 2019, Cllr Gabriel Rozenberg left the Conservatives to join the Liberal Democrats due to their stance on Brexit and the election of Boris Johnson as party leader.

Garden Suburb
Party	Candidate	Votes	%	±%
Conservative	John Marshall*	3,481	66.9	+7.8
Conservative	Gabriel Rozenberg*	3,442	66.2	+9.9
Conservative	Rohit Grover*	3,376	64.9	+9.1
Labour	Ruth Levin	880	16.9	−7.5
Labour	Mary McGuirk	854	16.4	−7.8
Labour	Ben MacKay	815	15.7	−5.0
Liberal Democrats	James Dearden	636	12.2	+3.8
Liberal Democrats	Penelope Gostyn	583	11.2	+3.3
Liberal Democrats	Jonathan Davies	578	11.1	+3.5
Green	Rachel Halls	460	8.8	−5.4
Turnout		5,201	48.1	
Conservative hold		Swing		
Conservative hold		Swing		
Conservative hold		Swing		

=== Golders Green ===
Golders Green
Party	Candidate	Votes	%	±%
Conservative	Dean Cohen*	3,308	66.9	+5.5
Conservative	Melvin Cohen*	3,218	65.0	+6.7
Conservative	Reuben Thompstone*	3,046	61.6	+15.2
Labour	Charles Harvey	1,240	25.1	−0.8
Labour	Sue O'Halloran	1,129	22.8	+0.4
Labour	Parmodh Sharma	1,028	20.8	−2.0
Green	Gillian Ward	357	7.2	−2.1
Liberal Democrats	Diana Darrer	311	6.3	+0.1
Liberal Democrats	Altan Akbiyik	258	5.2	+1.2
Liberal Democrats	Peter Lusher	252	5.1	+1.9
Turnout		4,948	43.7	
Conservative hold		Swing		
Conservative hold		Swing		
Conservative hold		Swing		

=== Hale ===
Hale
Party	Candidate	Votes	%	±%
Conservative	Elliot Simberg	3,130	51.9	+11.4
Conservative	Lachhya Gurung	3,007	49.9	+6.1
Conservative	Laithe Jajeh	2,999	49.8	+6.4
Labour	Rachel Barker	2,347	38.9	−1.7
Labour	Ernest Ambe	2,166	35.9	−4.2
Labour	Liron Velleman	1,976	32.8	−4.8
Green	Emile Batt	420	7.0	−3.8
Liberal Democrats	Michael Goodman	397	6.6	−0.1
Liberal Democrats	James Creighton	355	5.9	−0.1
Liberal Democrats	Geoffrey Jacobs	306	5.1	+0.2
Turnout		6,026	49.7	
Conservative hold		Swing		
Conservative hold		Swing		
Conservative gain from Labour		Swing		

=== Hendon ===
Hendon
Party	Candidate	Votes	%	±%
Conservative	Anthony Finn*	3,002	62.6	+11.6
Conservative	Mark Shooter*	2,950	61.6	+11.5
Conservative	Nizza Fluss	2,892	60.4	+12.1
Labour	Jenny Brown	1,217	25.4	−3.2
Labour	Andreas Ioannidis**	1,192	24.9	−3.0
Labour	David Beere	1,185	24.7	−2.0
Green	Carmen Legarda	316	6.6	−2.8
Liberal Democrats	Jason Moleman	271	5.7	−1.0
Liberal Democrats	Henryk Feszczur	252	5.3	−0.5
Liberal Democrats	Klevis Krasniqi	163	3.4	−0.9
Duma Polska	Malgorzata Zajaczkowska	130	2.7	N/A
Turnout		4,792	40.9	
Conservative hold		Swing		
Conservative hold		Swing		
Conservative hold		Swing		

Map showing the wards of Barnet London Borough Council

Ioannidis was a councillor for Brunswick Park ward prior to the election.

=== High Barnet ===
High Barnet
Party	Candidate	Votes	%	±%
Conservative	Wendy Prentice*	2,792	43.9	+2.6
Conservative	David Longstaff*	2,764	43.4	+2.3
Conservative	Julian Teare	2,605	41.0	±0.0
Labour	Amy Trevethan**	2,604	41.0	+18.0
Labour	Ange Balendra	2,386	37.6	+15.0
Labour	Paul Lemon	2,344	36.9	+16.9
Liberal Democrats	Duncan MacDonald	581	9.2	−7.1
Liberal Democrats	Simon Cohen	577	9.1	−4.3
Liberal Democrats	Sharmistha Michaels	481	7.6	−4.4
Independent	Ken Rowland	471	7.4	N/A
Green	Charles Wicksteed	425	6.7	−11.8
Green	Nathan Wade	328	5.2	−12.3
Turnout		6,367	55.0	
Conservative hold		Swing		
Conservative hold		Swing		
Conservative hold		Swing		

Trevethan was a councillor for Underhill prior to the election.

=== Mill Hill ===
Mill Hill
Party	Candidate	Votes	%	±%
Conservative	Val Duschinsky*	3,009	50.7	+11.3
Conservative	John Hart*	2,977	50.1	+8.2
Conservative	Golnar Bokaei	2,867	48.3	+10.3
Labour	Katherine Barker	1,555	26.2	+0.4
Labour	Mike Barker	1,431	24.1	−1.0
Labour	Kamal Gurung	1,307	22.0	−3.0
Liberal Democrats	Richard Logue	1,236	20.8	+6.1
Liberal Democrats	Roger Tichborne	1,200	20.2	+9.8
Liberal Democrats	Donna Pickup	1,045	17.6	+8.0
Green	Michelle Lynch	301	5.1	−5.0
Green	Kwatelai Quartey-Papafio	166	2.8	−2.9
Turnout		5,940	43.5	
Conservative hold		Swing		
Conservative hold		Swing		
Conservative hold		Swing		

=== Oakleigh ===
Oakleigh
Party	Candidate	Votes	%	±%
Conservative	Thomas Smith	2,814	52.0	+10.4
Conservative	Stephen Sowerby*	2,774	51.3	+12.1
Conservative	Sachin Rajput*	2,768	51.2	+10.4
Labour	Angie Hudson	1,943	35.9	+12.0
Labour	Nick Mahony	1,734	32.1	+9.0
Labour	Paul Probyn	1,629	30.1	+10.1
Green	Gabrielle Bailey	535	9.9	−0.5
Liberal Democrats	Elisabeth Edgar	421	7.8	+2.7
Liberal Democrats	Lisa Smith	420	7.8	+3.8
Liberal Democrats	Horora Morrissey	349	6.5	+2.5
Turnout		5,407	45.7	
Conservative hold		Swing		
Conservative hold		Swing		
Conservative hold		Swing		

=== Totteridge ===
Totteridge
Party	Candidate	Votes	%	±%
Conservative	Alison Cornelius*	2,862	59.5	+7.3
Conservative	Caroline Stock*	2,810	58.4	+9.1
Conservative	Richard Cornelius*	2,800	58.2	+7.5
Labour	Cameron Camiña	1,294	26.9	+2.2
Labour	Nancy Graterol-Montilla	1,197	24.9	+3.4
Labour	Rob Persad	1,150	23.9	+5.1
Liberal Democrats	Janice Turner	451	9.4	+1.8
Liberal Democrats	Fiona Brickwood	433	9.0	+3.0
Green	Jacob Trup	362	7.5	−3.5
Liberal Democrats	David Keech	322	6.7	+1.7
Green	Raymundo Obedencio	236	4.9	−3.7
Turnout		4,808	46.5	
Conservative hold		Swing		
Conservative hold		Swing		
Conservative hold		Swing		

=== Underhill ===
On February 25, 2019, Cllr Jessica Brayne left the Labour Party over their failure to tackle anti-Semitism and their stance on Brexit. She then joined the Liberal Democrats in September 2019.

Underhill
Party	Candidate	Votes	%	±%
Labour	Paul Edwards*	2,635	51.9	+9.6
Labour	Jess Brayne*	2,556	50.4	+10.7
Labour	Tim Roberts*	2,447	48.2	+9.8
Conservative	Gaynor Bond	1,839	36.2	+2.9
Conservative	Lara Akindiji	1,769	34.9	+5.8
Conservative	Maximilian Romain	1,547	30.5	+4.8
Liberal Democrats	Victor Corney	507	10.0	+5.3
Green	Dawn Laughton	467	9.2	−2.0
Liberal Democrats	Gerard Fitzgerald	282	5.6	+2.1
Liberal Democrats	Eunice Phillips	280	5.5	+2.2
Green	Brigitte Guile	278	5.5	−5.2
Turnout		5,074	43.0	
Labour hold		Swing		
Labour hold		Swing		
Labour hold		Swing		

=== West Finchley ===
West Finchley
Party	Candidate	Votes	%	±%
Labour	Ross Houston*	2,326	49.3	−0.7
Labour	Kath McGuirk*	2,279	48.3	+0.6
Labour	Danny Rich	2,069	43.8	−4.5
Conservative	Afshan Smith	1,563	33.1	+2.2
Conservative	Doron Jacobs	1,518	32.2	+3.0
Conservative	Ajantha Tennakoon	1,424	30.2	+6.1
Women's Equality	Amanda Shribman	497	10.5	N/A
Liberal Democrats	Carolina Garcia	428	9.1	+3.2
Green	John Colmans	418	8.9	−3.5
Green	David Burns	394	8.3	−1.6
Liberal Democrats	Thomas Darrer	357	7.6	+2.2
Liberal Democrats	Ronald Finlay	318	6.7	+2.0
Turnout		4,719	43.6	
Labour hold		Swing		
Labour hold		Swing		
Labour hold		Swing		

=== West Hendon ===
West Hendon
Party	Candidate	Votes	%	±%
Conservative	Saira Don	2,196	45.4	+10.3
Conservative	Alex Prager	2,155	44.5	+10.1
Conservative	Helene Richman	2,130	44.0	+12.0
Labour	Agnes Slocombe*	2,078	42.9	+1.7
Labour	Humayune Khalick	2,074	42.9	+1.2
Labour	Adam Langleben*	2,014	41.6	−0.7
Green	Miriam Green	299	6.2	−0.7
Liberal Democrats	Daniel Churchus	264	5.5	+1.4
Liberal Democrats	Michael Lees	238	4.9	+1.1
Liberal Democrats	David Watson	184	3.8	±0.0
Turnout		4,840	41.7	
Conservative gain from Labour		Swing		
Conservative gain from Labour		Swing		
Conservative gain from Labour		Swing		

=== Woodhouse ===
Woodhouse
Party	Candidate	Votes	%	±%
Labour	Anne Hutton*	2,915	54.8	+7.4
Labour	Geof Cooke*	2,796	52.6	+6.5
Labour	Alan Schneiderman*	2,677	50.3	+8.6
Conservative	Mark Higgins	1,547	29.1	±0.0
Conservative	James Marlow	1,514	28.5	+1.3
Conservative	Simon Shaer	1,499	28.2	+1.6
Green	Diane Burstein	541	10.2	−2.0
Liberal Democrats	Tanya Spensley	411	7.7	+3.3
Liberal Democrats	Jonathan Landau	366	6.9	+2.6
Green	Nicole Onyeche	354	6.7	−4.3
Green	Gardi Vaswani	316	5.9	−3.6
Liberal Democrats	Dara Vakili	254	4.8	+0.9
UKIP	Karl Khan	122	2.3	−8.8
Turnout		5,320	42.4	
Labour hold		Swing		
Labour hold		Swing		
Labour hold		Swing		

== By-elections between 2018 and 2022 ==
=== East Barnet ===
East Barnet by-election, 6 May 2021
Party	Candidate	Votes	%	±%
Conservative	Nicole Richer	2,549	43.8	+1.2
Labour	Linda Lusingu	2,257	38.8	−6.4
Green	Gabrielle Bailey	547	9.4	+0.4
Liberal Democrats	Sean Hooker	415	7.1	+1.7
For Britain	Alex Merola	49	0.8	New
Majority		292	5.0	N/A
Total votes		5,817	50.1	▲3.0
Conservative gain from Labour		Swing		

=== Edgware ===
Edgware by-election, 6 May 2021
Party	Candidate	Votes	%	±%
Conservative	Nick Mearing-Smith	3,427	62.5	−5.8
Labour	Andrea Bilbow	1,456	26.6	+1.5
Green	Sam Murray	343	6.3	−0.7
Liberal Democrats	Roger Tichborne	254	4.6	−2.0
Majority		1,971	35.9	−7.3
Total votes		5,535	44.2	+0.1
Conservative hold		Swing		
