= 1998 Barnet London Borough Council election =

1998 local election in England

← 1994	7 May 1998	2002 →

All 60 seats to Barnet London Borough Council 31 seats needed for a majority
- Registered: 225,836
- Turnout: 81,059, 35.89% (▼9.51)

	First party	Second party	Third party
Leader	Unknown	Alan Williams	Unknown
Party	Conservative	Labour	Liberal Democrats
Leader since	Unknown	1994 (Note: As leader of the council, unknown when he became the leader of the Labour Group)	Unknown
Leader's seat	Unknown	Burnt Oak	Unknown
Last election	29 seats, 37.61%	25 seats, 41.07%	6 seats, 19.66%
Seats before	27	24	6
Seats won	28	26	6
Seat change	▼1	▲1	Steady
Popular vote	89,529	92,954	37,846
Percentage	39.77%	40.0%	16.81%
Swing	▲2.16	▼0.31	▼2.85
- Map of the results of the 1998 Barnet London Borough council election. Conservatives in blue, Labour in red and Liberal Democrats in yellow..
Council control before election
No overall control
Council control after election
No overall control

The 1998 Barnet Council election took place on 7 May 1998 to elect members of Barnet London Borough Council in London, England. The whole council was up for election and the council stayed under no overall control.

Following the elections, the Labour-Liberal Democrat coalition that had governed since 1994 continued in office.

== Background ==
In between the two elections there had been a total of four by-elections to replace councillors who had either died or resigned from their seat, however none of these by-elections resulted in the seat changing parties. Just before the election there were a total of 3 vacancies that were too close to have a separate by-election, which meant that the council composition was as follows:

↓
24	6	27	3
Labour	Lib Dem	Con	Vacant

== Election result ==
Overall turnout in the election was 35.9%.

1998 Barnet London Borough Council elections
Party	Seats	Gains	Losses	Net gain/loss	Seats %	Votes %	Votes	+/−
Conservative	28	1	2	▼1	46.67	39.77	89,529	▲2.16
Labour	26	2	1	▲1	43.33	41.29	92,954	▼0.31
Liberal Democrats	6	0	0	Steady	10.00	16.81	37,846	▼2.85
Green	0	0	0	Steady	0.00	2.11	4,747	▲0.65
Natural Law	0	0	0	Steady	0.00	0.02	41	▼0.03
Total	60						225,117	

After this election, the composition of the council was as follows:

↓
28	6	26
Labour	Lib Dem	Con

== Ward results ==
(*) - Indicates an incumbent candidate

(†) - Indicates an incumbent candidate standing in a different ward

=== Arkley ===
Arkley (3)
Party	Candidate	Votes	%	±%
Labour	Anita Campbell*	2,288	46.66	▼3.28
Labour	Pamela Coleman*	2,075		
Labour	Pauline Coakley-Webb	2,072		
Conservative	Mark Johnson	1,907	39.35	▲5.95
Conservative	Andrew Knight	1,795		
Conservative	Tony Mirza	1,724		
Liberal Democrats	Victor Godman	470	9.94	▼6.72
Liberal Democrats	Nicholas Sullivan	460		
Liberal Democrats	Michael Cole	441		
Green	Aniel Paranjpe	186	4.05	New
Registered electors		12,081		▲425
Turnout		4,754	39.35	▼9.97
Rejected ballots		12	0.25	▼0.08
Labour hold				
Labour hold				
Labour hold				

=== Brunswick Park ===
Brunswick Park (3)
Party	Candidate	Votes	%	±%
Labour	Geoffrey Cooke	1,826	44.99	▲8.23
Conservative	Andreas Tambourides	1,781	44.92	▼0.59
Conservative	Lynne Hillan	1,774		
Labour	Paul Rogers	1,700		
Labour	Michael Marshall	1,689		
Conservative	Arik Yacobi	1,653		
Liberal Democrats	Peter Finlayson	446	10.09	▼7.64
Liberal Democrats	Peter Watkins	383		
Liberal Democrats	Charles Wicksteed	341		
Registered electors		10,854		▲503
Turnout		4,164	38.36	▼4.47
Rejected ballots		11	0.26	▼0.10
Labour gain from Conservative				
Conservative hold				
Conservative hold				

=== Burnt Oak ===
Burnt Oak (3)
Party	Candidate	Votes	%	±%
Labour	Allan Turner*	1,844	75.40	▲3.20
Labour	Alan Williams*	1,830		
Labour	Linda McFadyen^{†} (Note: McFadyen was a sitting councillor representing the Arkley ward)	1,615		
Conservative	Peter Edwards	430	15.15	▲1.82
Conservative	Urmil Bhatt	317		
Conservative	Keith Dyall	316		
Liberal Democrats	Andrew Packer	289	9.45	▲0.93
Liberal Democrats	Karen Hatchett	215		
Liberal Democrats	Henryk Feszczur	159		
Registered electors		9,685		▲233
Turnout		2,649	27.35	▼15.43
Rejected ballots		19	0.72	▲0.55
Labour hold				
Labour hold				
Labour hold				

=== Childs Hill ===
Childs Hill (3)
Party	Candidate	Votes	%	±%
Liberal Democrats	Jack Cohen*	1,422	43.13	▼8.21
Liberal Democrats	Monroe Palmer	1,407		
Liberal Democrats	Susette Palmer*	1,380		
Labour	Lorna Noble	1,047	30.90	▲10.85
Labour	Clare Fitzpatrick	1,015		
Labour	Keith Priddle	953		
Conservative	Jonathan Miller	872	25.97	▼2.64
Conservative	Peter Sugarman	872		
Conservative	Marc Shaw	790		
Registered electors		9,709		▲907
Turnout		3,461	35.65	▼8.49
Rejected ballots		22	0.64	▲0.41
Liberal Democrats hold				
Liberal Democrats hold				
Liberal Democrats hold				

=== Colindale ===
Colindale (3)
Party	Candidate	Votes	%	±%
Labour	Danish Chopra* (Note: Chopra was elected in a by-election triggered by the death of Cllr Thomas Mckendry in 1996, a councillor who had also been elected in a by-election triggered by the death of Cllr Ellis Hillman a few months earlier)	1,715	62.71	▼2.05
Labour	Gillian Sargeant*	1,589		
Labour	Nathaniel Rudolf	1,464		
Conservative	Robert Linton	485	18.07	▼0.06
Conservative	Kirit Patel	452		
Conservative	Yvonne Prentice	437		
Liberal Democrats	Arthur Roycroft	337	12.94	▲2.81
Liberal Democrats	Guy Patton	332		
Liberal Democrats	Michael Roberts	315		
Green	Ketan Majmudar	159	6.27	▲0.72
Registered electors		12,110		▲1,774
Turnout		2,799	23.11	▼16.62
Rejected ballots		13	0.46	▲0.24
Labour hold				
Labour hold				
Labour hold				

=== East Barnet ===
East Barnet (3)
Party	Candidate	Votes	%	±%
Labour	Elizabeth Jarvis*	2,041	43.44	▼0.56
Labour	Usha Chopra*	1,962		
Conservative	Olwen Evans	1,942	42.06	▲6.02
Conservative	Zoe Ford	1,914		
Labour	Brenda Sandford	1,914		
Conservative	James Hawthorn	1,873		
Liberal Democrats	David Keech	432	8.86	▼11.10
Liberal Democrats	Elizabeth Wardle	423		
Liberal Democrats	Renee Wheeler	351		
Green	Raymond White	256	5.64	New
Registered electors		11,427		▲297
Turnout		4,657	40.75	▼7.52
Rejected ballots		13	0.27	▲0.18
Labour hold				
Labour hold				
Conservative gain from Labour				

=== East Finchley ===
East Finchley (3)
Party	Candidate	Votes	%	±%
Labour	Helen Gordon*	2,750	62.10	▲3.46
Labour	Alison Moore	2,547		
Labour	Philip Yeoman	2,529		
Conservative	Barry Neville	850	19.50	▼0.76
Conservative	Mike Freer	822		
Conservative	Graham Old	786		
Green	Noel Lynch	577	9.28	▼1.74
Liberal Democrats	Joyce Arram	458	9.13	▼0.95
Liberal Democrats	Elinor Edwards	358		
Green	Sally Rose	355		
Liberal Democrats	Thomas Darrer	334		
Green	Denis Vigay	237		
Registered electors		11,698		▲672
Turnout		4,542	38.83	▼12.04
Rejected ballots		26	0.57	▲0.46
Labour hold				
Labour hold				
Labour hold				

=== Edgware ===
Edgware (3)
Party	Candidate	Votes	%	±%
Conservative	Anthony Spencer* (Note: Spencer was elected in a by-election triggered by the resignation of Cllr Julian Czarny in 1996)	1,642	49.87	▲1.13
Conservative	Malcolm Lester*	1,592		
Conservative	Joan Scannell*	1,532		
Labour	Maree Glass	1,206	36.35	▲2.71
Labour	Harold Waterman	1,148		
Labour	Alan Sloam	1,120		
Liberal Democrats	Barbara Farbey	324	9.35	▼8.27
Liberal Democrats	June Burton	323		
Liberal Democrats	Diana Iwi	247		
Green	Jonathan Mulberg	141	4.43	New
Registered electors		11,692		▲547
Turnout		3,382	28.93	▼10.50
Rejected ballots		35	1.03	▲0.85
Conservative hold				
Conservative hold				
Conservative hold				

=== Finchley ===
Finchley (3)
Party	Candidate	Votes	%	±%
Conservative	Eva Greenspan*	1,973	46.03	▼2.66
Conservative	Leslie Sussman*	1,882		
Conservative	Barbara Langstone*	1,829		
Labour	Clare Furniss	1,523	35.55	▲5.43
Labour	Ilan Jacobs	1,441		
Labour	Mary McGuirk	1,425		
Liberal Democrats	Malcolm Davis	501	9.55	▼5.75
Green	Ashley Gunstock	365	8.87	▲2.98
Liberal Democrats	Rita Druiff	346		
Liberal Democrats	Millicent Watkins	332		
Registered electors		10,572		▲701
Turnout		4,105	38.83	▼7.57
Rejected ballots		18	0.44	▲0.09
Conservative hold				
Conservative hold				
Conservative hold				

=== Friern Barnet ===
Friern Barnet (3)
Party	Candidate	Votes	%	±%
Conservative	James Chapman	2,107	49.73	▲3.02
Conservative	Brian Salinger*	1,966		
Conservative	John Tiplady*	1,924		
Labour	Ross Houston	1,407	33.90	▼2.75
Labour	Timothy Roberts	1,372		
Labour	Dilip Mitra	1,310		
Liberal Democrats	Neil Ferguson	446	10.45	▼6.20
Liberal Democrats	Tanya Jordan	426		
Liberal Democrats	Yvonne Wicksteed	388		
Green	Miranda Dunn	238	5.92	New
Registered electors		11,232		▲560
Turnout		4,153	36.97	▼9.91
Rejected ballots		12	0.29	▲0.13
Conservative hold				
Conservative hold				
Conservative hold				

=== Garden Suburb ===
Garden Suburb (3)
Party	Candidate	Votes	%	±%
Conservative	John Marshall	2,649	53.77	▲10.25
Conservative	Peter Skolar	2,073		
Conservative	Yasman Naghar	2,024		
Liberal Democrats	Marjorie Harris	1,312	28.76	▼11.20
Liberal Democrats	Steven Hajioff	1,229		
Liberal Democrats	Steven Deller	1,068		
Labour	Carol Kohli	531	11.35	▼5.17
Labour	Anthony Hulstrom	450		
Labour	Polly Napper	443		
Green	Louise Gunstock	256	6.12	New
Registered electors		10,265		▲510
Turnout		4,314	42.03	▼0.22
Rejected ballots		23	0.53	▲0.19
Conservative hold				
Conservative hold				
Conservative hold				

=== Golders Green ===
Golders Green (3)
Party	Candidate	Votes	%	±%
Conservative	Melvin Cohen*	1,946	49.33	▲8.78
Conservative	Abraham Dunner	1,946		
Conservative	Christopher Harris	1,762		
Labour	David Robinson	1,617	41.26	▲11.40
Labour	Alan Schneiderman	1,579		
Labour	Matthew Staples	1,533		
Liberal Democrats	Olive Ellner	397	9.41	▼17.29
Liberal Democrats	Peter Lusher	344		
Liberal Democrats	Simon Kovar	338		
Registered electors		10,783		▼908
Turnout		4,139	38.38	▼3.87
Rejected ballots		23	0.56	▲0.22
Conservative hold				
Conservative hold				
Conservative hold				

=== Hadley ===
Hadley (3)
Party	Candidate	Votes	%	±%
Conservative	Katia David	2,674	46.80	▲12.75
Conservative	Hazel Mammatt*	2,654		
Conservative	Kantilal Patel*	2,456		
Labour	Michael Campbell	1,984	33.19	▲4.14
Labour	Marianne Haylett	1,791		
Labour	Lawrence Williams	1,746		
Liberal Democrats	Ronald Marsh	785	12.65	▼8.85
Liberal Democrats	David Nowell	725		
Liberal Democrats	Brigid Povah	594		
Green	Timothy Riley	408	7.36	▼1.90
Registered electors		14,209		▲613
Turnout		5,611	39.49	▼6.83
Rejected ballots		33	0.59	▲0.51
Conservative hold				
Conservative hold				
Conservative hold				

=== Hale ===
Hale (3)
Party	Candidate	Votes	%	±%
Labour	Steven Blomer	1,523	44.03	▲3.96
Labour	Ruth Nyman	1,498		
Conservative	Brian Gordon	1,393	38.49	▼4.09
Labour	Julian Stern	1,379		
Conservative	Michael Slipman	1,253		
Conservative	Prafulla Patel	1,201		
Liberal Democrats	James Creighton	658	17.48	▲0.13
Liberal Democrats	Geoffrey Jacobs	557		
Liberal Democrats	Jeremy Pattison	532		
Registered electors		10,489		▲668
Turnout		3,655	34.85	▼12.35
Rejected ballots		28	0.77	▲0.62
Labour hold				
Labour gain from Conservative				
Conservative hold				

=== Hendon ===
Hendon (3)
Party	Candidate	Votes	%	±%
Conservative	Anthony Finn*	1,487	37.08	▼6.29
Conservative	Maureen Braun	1,349		
Conservative	Andrew Sherling* (Note: Cllr Sherling was elected in a by-election triggered by the resignation of Cllr Edward Bunn in 1996)	1,293		
Liberal Democrats	Susan Palin	1,226	30.24	▲11.99
Liberal Democrats	Jonathan Davies^{†} (Note: Davies was a sitting councillor representing the Childs Hill ward)	1,164		
Labour	Aubrey Ross	1,105	27.29	▼3.61
Labour	Francis Deutsch	1,022		
Liberal Democrats	Sean Hooker	977		
Labour	Margaret Onokah	912		
Green	Georgia Theodorou	200	5.39	▼2.09
Registered electors		12,279		▲1,096
Turnout		3,867	31.49	▼8.58
Rejected ballots		10	0.26	▼0.52
Conservative hold				
Conservative hold				
Conservative hold				

=== Mill Hill ===
Mill Hill (3)
Party	Candidate	Votes	%	±%
Liberal Democrats	Wayne Casey*	2,469	56.81	▲16.29
Liberal Democrats	Roger Axworthy	2,348		
Liberal Democrats	Jeremy Davies*	2,339		
Conservative	Mary Gallagher	1,083	25.21	▼13.79
Conservative	Richard Martyn	1,053		
Conservative	Leslie Pym^{†} (Note: Pym was a sitting councillor representing the Hale ward)	1,040		
Labour	William Parnaby	652	14.36	▼6.12
Labour	Pijushkanti Bhattacharyya	622		
Labour	Mohan Samarasinhe	535		
Green	Gillian Dunne	152	3.62	New
Registered electors		11,545		▲828
Turnout		4,289	37.15	▼7.18
Rejected ballots		9	0.21	▲0.08
Liberal Democrats hold				
Liberal Democrats hold				
Liberal Democrats hold				

=== St Paul's ===
St Paul's (3)
Party	Candidate	Votes	%	±%
Labour	Kitty Lyons*	2,332	51.87	▲5.90
Labour	Katherine McGuirk*	2,214		
Labour	James Tierney*	2,182		
Conservative	Mary Phillips	1,427	31.57	▼7.99
Conservative	Ida Westbrook	1,359		
Conservative	Jonathan Shrank	1,308		
Liberal Democrats	Joan Beales	421	8.63	▼0.56
Liberal Democrats	Hugh L'Estrange	362		
Green	Edelgard Vaswani	343	7.93	▲2.64
Liberal Democrats	lngeborg Graber	336		
Registered electors		10,732		▲590
Turnout		4,423	41.21	▼14.69
Rejected ballots		18	0.41	▲0.27
Labour hold				
Labour hold				
Labour hold				

=== Totteridge ===
Totteridge (3)
Party	Candidate	Votes	%	±%
Conservative	Victor Lyon*	2,472	54.94	▲7.25
Conservative	Brian Coleman	2,457		
Conservative	Kevin Edson*	2,415		
Labour	Katherine Rounce	1,273	27.60	▼3.72
Labour	Michael O'Donnell	1,246		
Labour	Victoria Spawls	1,171		
Liberal Democrats	Irene Brewer	518	10.53	▼7.88
Liberal Democrats	Anthony Wildsmith	450		
Liberal Democrats	Gavin Jordan	439		
Green	Joy Boustred	268	6.01	New
Natural Law	Diane Derksen	41	0.92	▼1.66
Registered electors		11,628		▲536
Turnout		4,483	38.55	▼4.99
Rejected ballots		18	0.40	▲0.15
Conservative hold				
Conservative hold				
Conservative hold				

=== West Hendon ===
West Hendon (3)
Party	Candidate	Votes	%	±%
Labour	Agnes Slocombe*	1,408	47.98	▼4.82
Labour	Arun Ghosh	1,407		
Labour	Ansuya Sodha	1,215		
Conservative	James Fluss	979	34.66	▲7.61
Conservative	Angela Shine	978		
Conservative	Rene Braun	954		
Liberal Democrats	Richard Coward	344	11.25	▼1.71
Liberal Democrats	Mary Dodd	302		
Liberal Democrats	Shirley Rodwell	299		
Green	Christine Antoniou	171	6.11	▼1.06
Registered electors		10,707		▲569
Turnout		3,057	28.55	▼10.55
Rejected ballots		23	0.75	▲0.25
Labour hold				
Labour hold				
Labour hold				

=== Woodhouse ===
Woodhouse (3)
Party	Candidate	Votes	%	±%
Labour	Stanley Cross*	2,521	53.87	▲1.07
Labour	Beverley Pearce	2,358		
Labour	Barry Rawlings	2,288		
Conservative	Mary Russell	1,236	27.10	▼9.07
Conservative	Roy Treeby	1,209		
Conservative	Peter Yallouros	1,160		
Green	Solomon Natelson	435	9.81	New
Liberal Democrats	David Ive	413	9.22	▼1.81
Liberal Democrats	Barrie Manson	407		
Liberal Democrats	Joy Manson	407		
Registered electors		12,139		▲208
Turnout		4,555	37.52	▼15.43
Rejected ballots		23	0.50	▲0.22
Labour hold				
Labour hold				
Labour hold				
