= Friern Barnet (ward) =

Electoral ward in Barnet, London, England

- Electoral ward for the Barnet London Borough Council
- Friern Barnet ward boundaries since 2022
- Borough: Barnet
- County: Greater London
- Population: 19,450 (2021) (Note: 2021 Census data reported for 2022 ward boundaries)
- Electorate: 12,662 (2022)
- Major settlements: Colney Hatch, Friern Barnet
- Area: 2.912 square kilometres (1.124 sq mi)

Current electoral ward
- Created: 2022
- Number of members: 3
- Councillors: Pauline Coakley Webb; Linda Lusingu; Barry Rawlings
- Created from: Coppetts, Oakleigh, Woodhouse
- GSS code: E05013640

Friern Barnet is an electoral ward in the London Borough of Barnet. The ward was originally created in 1968, revised in 1978 and abolished in 2002. It was created again in 2022 and used from the 2022 elections. It returns three councillors to Barnet London Borough Council.

== List of councillors ==
Seat	Councillor	Took office	Left office	Party	Election
1	Ena Constable	1968	1974	Conservative	1964, 1968, 1971
2	William Tangye	1968	1970	Conservative	1968
3	W. Pearson	1968	1974	Conservative	1964, 1968, 1971
2	John Tiplady	1970	2002	Conservative	1970 ... 1998
1	David Burton	1974	1986	Conservative	1974, 1978, 1982
3	Frank Gibson	1974	1986	Conservative	1974, 1978, 1982
1	Brian Sallinger	1986	2002	Conservative	1986 ... 1998
3	Christopher Platford	1986	1994	Conservative	1986, 1990
3	Thomas Carter	1994	1998	Conservative	1994, 1998
3	James Chapman	1998	2002	Conservative	1998
1	Pauline Coakley Webb	2022	Incumbent	Labour	2022
3	Linda Lusingu (Note: Linda Lusingu changed parties in 2023 and 2026.)	2022	Incumbent	Labour	2022
3	Linda Lusingu	2022	Incumbent	Independent	2022
3	Linda Lusingu	2022	Incumbent	Green	2022
3	Barry Rawlings	2022	Incumbent	Labour	2022

== Barnet council elections since 2022 ==
There was a revision of ward boundaries in Barnet in 2022. The Friern Barnet ward was recreated with significantly different boundaries to the previous ward, stretching south to include Colney Hatch.

=== 2022 election ===
The election took place on 5 May 2022.

2022 Barnet London Borough Council election: Friern Barnet
Party	Candidate	Votes	%	±%
Labour	Pauline Coakley Webb	3,030	65.3	
Labour	Linda Lusingu	2,880	62.1	
Labour	Barry Rawlings	2,779	59.9	
Conservative	Kate Salinger	1,137	24.5	
Conservative	Kevin Ghateh	1,026	22.1	
Conservative	Anila Skeja	991	21.4	
Green	Ed Tytherleigh	550	11.9	
Liberal Democrats	Graham Craig	367	7.9	
Liberal Democrats	Lavinia Jessup	350	7.5	
Liberal Democrats	Zoe Myerson	350	7.5	
Turnout		4,640	36.6	
Labour win (new seat)				
Labour win (new seat)				
Labour win (new seat)				

== 1978–2002 Barnet council elections ==
Friern Barnet
- Former electoral ward for the Barnet London Borough Council
- Friern Barnet ward boundaries from 1978 to 2002
- Borough: Barnet
- County: Greater London
- Electorate: 11,232 (1998)
- Major settlements: Friern Barnet, Whetstone

Former electoral ward
- Created: 1968
- Abolished: 2002
- Number of members: 3

There was a revision of ward boundaries in Barnet in 1978.

=== 1998 election ===
The election on 7 May 1998 took place on the same day as the 1998 Greater London Authority referendum.

1998 Barnet London Borough Council election: Friern Barnet
Party	Candidate	Votes	%	±%
Conservative	James Chapman	2,107	49.73	▲3.02
Conservative	Brian Salinger	1,966		
Conservative	John Tiplady	1,924		
Labour	Ross Houston	1,407	33.90	▼2.75
Labour	Timothy Roberts	1,372		
Labour	Dilip Mitra	1,310		
Liberal Democrats	Neil Ferguson	446	10.45	▼6.20
Liberal Democrats	Tanya Jordan	426		
Liberal Democrats	Yvonne Wicksteed	388		
Green	Miranda Dunn	238	5.92	New
Registered electors		11,232		▲560
Turnout		4,153	36.97	▼9.91
Rejected ballots		12	0.29	▲0.13
Conservative hold		Swing		
Conservative hold		Swing		
Conservative hold		Swing		

=== 1994 election ===
The election took place on 5 May 1994.

1994 Barnet London Borough Council election: Friern Barnet
Party	Candidate	Votes	%	±%
Conservative	Thomas Carter	2,242	46.71	▼6.18
Conservative	Brian Salinger	2,198		
Conservative	John Tiplady	2,179		
Labour	Roger Chapman	1,835	36.65	▼0.29
Labour	Simon Montague	1,741		
Labour	Michael Harris	1,617		
Liberal Democrats	Matthew Harris	827	16.65	▲6.48
Liberal Democrats	Jonathan Griffiths	774		
Liberal Democrats	Steven Deller	758		
Registered electors		10,672		▼124
Turnout		5,003	46.88	▼7.40
Rejected ballots		8	0.16	▼0.06
Conservative hold		Swing		
Conservative hold		Swing		
Conservative hold		Swing		

=== 1990 election ===
The election took place on 3 May 1990.

1990 Barnet London Borough Council election: Friern Barnet
Party	Candidate	Votes	%	±%
Conservative	John Tiplady	2,913		
Conservative	Christopher Platford	2,896		
Conservative	Brian Salinger	2,895		
Labour	John Ellis	2,035		
Labour	Lorimer Mackenzie	2,024		
Labour	Philip O'Connor	2,020		
Liberal Democrats	Nicholas Harvey	579		
Liberal Democrats	Timothy Tombs	554		
Liberal Democrats	Andrew Wade	541		
Turnout				
Conservative hold		Swing		
Conservative hold		Swing		
Conservative hold		Swing		

=== 1986 election ===
The election took place on 8 May 1986.

1986 Barnet London Borough Council election: Friern Barnet
Party	Candidate	Votes	%	±%
Conservative	John Tiplady	2,318		
Conservative	Brian Salinger	2,309		
Conservative	Christopher Platford	2,272		
Labour	Hilary Delyon	1,208		
Labour	Mary Nutkins	1,202		
Labour	Roger Matthews	1,193		
Alliance	Nicholas Harvey	1,129		
Alliance	Andrew Wade	1,090		
Alliance	David Litherland	1,053		
Turnout				
Conservative hold		Swing		
Conservative hold		Swing		
Conservative hold		Swing		

=== 1982 election ===
The election took place on 6 May 1982.

1982 Barnet London Borough Council election: Friern Barnet
Party	Candidate	Votes	%	±%
Conservative	David Burton	2,674		
Conservative	Frank Gibson	2,627		
Conservative	John Tiplady	2,590		
Alliance	Christopher Perkin	1,213		
Alliance	Bruce Standing	1,209		
Alliance	Frank Davis	1,183		
Labour	Peter Butcher	921		
Labour	Stephanie Dardis	862		
Labour	Harry Kerens	806		
Turnout				
Conservative hold		Swing		
Conservative hold		Swing		
Conservative hold		Swing		

=== 1978 election ===
The election took place on 4 May 1978.

1978 Barnet London Borough Council election: Friern Barnet
Party	Candidate	Votes	%	±%
Conservative	David Burton	2,856		
Conservative	John Tiplady	2,831		
Conservative	Frank Gibson	2,827		
Labour	Peter Butcher	838		
Labour	Frank Edwards	812		
Labour	Charles Owen	809		
Liberal	Karl Ruge	565		
Liberal	Christopher Perkin	549		
Liberal	Yvonne Jessop	506		
Turnout			41.4	
Conservative win (new boundaries)				
Conservative win (new boundaries)				
Conservative win (new boundaries)				

== 1968–1978 Barnet council elections ==
=== 1974 election ===
The election took place on 2 May 1974.

1974 Barnet London Borough Council election: Friern Barnet
Party	Candidate	Votes	%	±%
Conservative	David Burton	2,275		
Conservative	Frank Gibson	2,272		
Conservative	John Tiplady	2,265		
Labour	R. Dunn	1,063		
Liberal	S. Crossick	1,025		
Labour	J. Scammell	1,020		
Labour	C. Williams	1,007		
Liberal	R. Pearman	990		
Liberal	R. Aron	974		
Turnout			42.4	
Conservative hold		Swing		
Conservative hold		Swing		
Conservative hold		Swing		

=== 1971 election ===
The election took place on 13 May 1971.

1971 Barnet London Borough Council election: Friern Barnet
Party	Candidate	Votes	%	±%
Conservative	Ena Constable	2,424		
Conservative	John Tiplady	2,357		
Conservative	W. Pearson	2,348		
Labour	T. Pugh	904		
Labour	M. De Vane	838		
Labour	R. Malvanker	807		
Liberal	G. Morris	592		
Liberal	S. Winter	572		
Liberal	R. Aron	549		
Turnout			34.0	
Conservative hold		Swing		
Conservative hold		Swing		
Conservative hold		Swing		

=== 1970 by-election ===
The by-election took place on 10 June 1970.

1970 Friern Barnet by-election
Party	Candidate	Votes	%	±%
Conservative	John Tiplady	1,616		
Liberal	S. Winter	277		
Labour	M. Goddard	263		
Turnout			18.6	

=== 1968 election ===
The election took place on 9 May 1968.

1968 Barnet London Borough Council election: Friern Barnet
Party	Candidate	Votes	%	±%
Conservative	Ena Constable	3,093	78.3	
Conservative	William Tangye	2,984		
Conservative	W. Pearson	2,865		
Liberal	K. Ruge	529	12.1	
Liberal	D. Duncombe	436		
Liberal	J. Veats	422		
Labour	J. Roberts	384	9.6	
Labour	T. Parker	362		
Labour	A. Wright	347		
Turnout			38.0	
Conservative win (new seat)				
Conservative win (new seat)				
Conservative win (new seat)				
