= 2010 Barnet London Borough Council election =

2010 local election in England

- 6 May 2010

All 63 seats to Barnet London Borough Council 32 seats needed for a majority
	First party	Second party	Third party
Party	Conservative	Labour	Liberal Democrats
Seats won	39	21	3
Seat change	▲2	▲1	▼3
Popular vote	62,285	46,102	29,911
Percentage	40.8%	30.2%	19.6%
Swing	▼0.9%	▲3.6%	▼0.1%
- Map of the results of the 2010 Barnet council election. Conservatives in blue, Labour in red and Liberal Democrats in yellow.
Council control before election
Conservative Party (UK)
Council control after election
Conservative Party (UK)

The 2010 Barnet Council election took place on 6 May 2010 to elect members of Barnet London Borough Council in London, England. The whole council was up for election and the Conservative Party stayed in overall control of the council.

== Background ==
Before the election the Conservatives ran the council with 36 seats, compared to 20 for Labour and 6 for the Liberal Democrats, with one seat vacant in Golders Green ward. A total of 251 candidates stood in the election including a full slate of 63 each from the Conservative, Labour and Liberal Democrat parties. The Green Party stood 51 candidates, a record for the party in Barnet, while there were 11 candidates from the new Residents Association of Barnet, 1 from the British National Party and 2 independents.

The Conservative councillors Mike Freer and Matthew Offord stood down at the election, as they were standing in the constituencies of Finchley and Golders Green and Hendon respectively in the general election, which took place at the same time as the council election.

== Election result ==
The results saw the Conservatives increase their majority on the council after making a net gain of 2 seats to have 39 councillors. The Conservatives lost 1 seat to Labour in Coppetts ward, but gained 3 seats from the Liberal Democrats. This left Labour on 21 seats, while the Liberal Democrats were reduced to 3 seats in Childs Hill, after losing 2 seats in Mill Hill and 1 seat in High Barnet to the Conservatives. Neither the Green Party nor the Residents' Association of Barnet managed to win any seats.

== Election result ==
The results saw the Conservatives increase their majority on the council after making a net gain of 2 seats to have 39 councillors. The Conservatives lost 1 seat to Labour in Coppetts ward, but gained 3 seats from the Liberal Democrats. This left Labour on 21 seats, while the Liberal Democrats were reduced to 3 seats in Childs Hill, after losing 2 seats in Mill Hill and 1 seat in High Barnet to the Conservatives. Neither the Green Party nor the Residents' Association of Barnet managed to win any seats.

Barnet local election result 2010
Party	Seats	Gains	Losses	Net gain/loss	Seats %	Votes %	Votes	+/−
Conservative	39	3	1	+2	61.9	40.8	62,285	-0.9
Labour	21	1	0	+1	33.3	30.2	46,102	+3.6
Liberal Democrats	3	0	3	-3	4.8	19.6	29,911	-0.1
Green	0	0	0	0	0.0	6.2	9,469	-4.1
Residents' Association	0	0	0	0	0.0	2.3	3,454	N/A
Independent	0	0	0	0	0.0	0.6	938	-0.8
BNP	0	0	0	0	0.0	0.2	364	N/A

== Ward results ==
=== Brunswick Park ===
Brunswick Park (3 seats)
Party	Candidate	Votes	%	±%
Conservative	Andreas Tambourides*	3,496	46.8	−14.4
Conservative	Lisa Rutter*	3,353	44.9	−14.3
Conservative	Lynne Hillan*	3,307	44.3	−19.2
Labour	Marianne Haylett	1,994	26.7	+11.4
Labour	Lawrence Williams	1,937	25.9	+12.2
Labour	Clement Magoba	1,758	23.5	+10.0
Liberal Democrats	Charles Wicksteed	1,289	17.3	+3.4
Liberal Democrats	Eileen Umbo	1,217	16.3	+3.2
Liberal Democrats	Gabrielle Wong	1,066	14.3	+2.7
Green	Ashley Bond	548	7.3	−2.3
Green	Murat Gurses	431	5.8	N/A
Green	Howard Javes	409	5.5	N/A
Turnout		7,468	65.0	+22.4
Conservative hold		Swing		
Conservative hold		Swing		
Conservative hold		Swing		

=== Burnt Oak ===
Burnt Oak (3 seats)
Party	Candidate	Votes	%	±%
Labour	Claire Farrier*	3,541	59.0	−5.9
Labour	Alex Brodkin	3,519	58.6	−0.3
Labour	Charlie O'Macauley*	3,230	53.8	−3.6
Conservative	Keith Dyall	1,315	21.9	+4.1
Conservative	Pat Sparrow	1,241	20.7	+3.4
Conservative	Michael Martin	1,179	19.6	+3.3
Liberal Democrats	Karen Hatchett	890	14.8	+2.9
Liberal Democrats	Michael Roberts	780	13.0	+2.1
Liberal Democrats	Henryk Feszczur	760	12.7	+0.8
Turnout		6,005	54.6	+22.2
Labour hold		Swing		
Labour hold		Swing		
Labour hold		Swing		

=== Childs Hill ===
Childs Hill (3 seats)
Party	Candidate	Votes	%	±%
Liberal Democrats	Jack Cohen*	2,596	38.2	−5.8
Liberal Democrats	Monroe Palmer*	2,519	37.1	−7.1
Liberal Democrats	Susette Palmer*	2,404	35.4	−7.0
Conservative	John Gearson	2,285	33.7	−1.0
Conservative	Robert Curtis	2,258	33.3	−0.4
Conservative	Jill Summers	2,177	32.1	+0.1
Labour	Sonia Bryant	1,603	23.6	+7.7
Labour	Alan Or-Bach	1,296	19.1	+3.6
Labour	Ade Oyenuga	1,258	18.5	+3.5
Green	Christine Antoniou	456	6.7	−4.9
Green	Jenifer Millstone	369	5.4	N/A
Green	Victor Schonfeld	352	5.2	N/A
Turnout		6,787	55.3	+19.2
Liberal Democrats hold		Swing		
Liberal Democrats hold		Swing		
Liberal Democrats hold		Swing		

=== Colindale ===
Colindale (3 seats)
Party	Candidate	Votes	%	±%
Labour	Geoff Johnson	3,259	57.7	+2.8
Labour	Gill Sargeant*	2,836	50.2	−1.1
Labour	Zakia Zubairi*	2,711	48.0	−3.0
Conservative	Brian Mann	1,175	20.8	−1.0
Conservative	William Nicholson	1,175	20.8	−0.7
Liberal Democrats	Danny Estermann	1,095	19.4	+3.5
Conservative	Sirous Esfandyari-Moghaddam	1,019	18.0	+2.2
Liberal Democrats	Philip Reynolds	898	15.9	+0.6
Liberal Democrats	Sabriye Warsame	764	13.5	−4.5
Green	Zain Sardar	337	6.0	−5.9
Green	Daniel Graham	306	5.4	N/A
Green	Charlene Concepcion	276	4.9	N/A
Turnout		5,648	51.4	+20.4
Labour hold		Swing		
Labour hold		Swing		
Labour hold		Swing		

=== Coppetts ===
Coppetts (3 seats)
Party	Candidate	Votes	%	±%
Labour	Barry Rawlings*	2,576	37.3	−1.1
Conservative	Kate Salinger*	2,493	36.1	−1.9
Labour	Pauline Webb	2,471	35.8	+0.5
Labour	Kathy Levine	2,373	34.4	−0.3
Conservative	Mukesh Depala*	2,288	33.2	−2.5
Conservative	Nicky Wolfe	2,144	31.1	−2.6
Liberal Democrats	Neil Ferguson	1,316	19.1	+7.1
Liberal Democrats	Anthony Spitzel	1,156	16.8	+5.3
Liberal Democrats	Elizabeth Wardle	1,016	14.7	+3.9
Green	Edward Bunting	681	9.9	−2.4
Green	David Gutmann	448	6.5	−5.3
Green	Elestren Oldfield	378	5.5	−6.5
Turnout		6,900	60.0	+20.0
Labour hold		Swing		
Conservative hold		Swing		
Labour gain from Conservative		Swing		

=== East Barnet ===
East Barnet (3 seats)
Party	Candidate	Votes	%	±%
Conservative	Joanna Tambourides*	2,882	37.7	−10.8
Conservative	Barry Evangeli	2,818	36.9	−11.1
Conservative	Robert Rams*	2,813	36.8	−9.1
Labour	Robert Persad	1,675	21.9	−13.9
Labour	Andreas Ioannidis	1,557	20.4	−12.3
Labour	Tusha Chakraborti	1,547	20.2	−11.0
Liberal Democrats	Roger Aitken	1,347	17.6	+5.2
Residents' Association	John Dix	1,264	16.5	N/A
Residents' Association	Denis Robb	1,233	16.1	N/A
Residents' Association	Sandra Lea	1,158	15.1	N/A
Liberal Democrats	Stephen Barber	1,155	15.1	+4.4
Liberal Democrats	Dennis Bird	1,105	14.5	+6.1
Green	Kate Tansley	451	5.9	−5.3
Green	Christopher Kondic	397	5.2	N/A
BNP	Stephen Curry	364	4.8	N/A
Turnout		7,644	66.6	+20.3
Conservative hold		Swing		
Conservative hold		Swing		
Conservative hold		Swing		

=== East Finchley ===
East Finchley (3 seats)
Party	Candidate	Votes	%	±%
Labour	Alison Moore*	3,315	45.0	+0.9
Labour	Andrew McNeil*	2,931	39.8	−2.3
Labour	Colin Rogers*	2,868	39.0	−3.1
Conservative	Kit Friend	1,994	27.1	+1.4
Conservative	John Scott	1,855	25.2	−0.5
Liberal Democrats	Joyce Arram	1,735	23.6	+5.8
Conservative	Aarti Bhanderi-Shah	1,723	23.4	−2.2
Liberal Democrats	Gerald Darrer	1,397	19.0	+3.7
Liberal Democrats	Micky Watkins	1,237	16.8	+3.6
Green	Noel Lynch	652	8.9	−8.9
Green	Stephen Norman	588	8.0	−6.0
Green	Andrew Newby	477	6.5	N/A
Turnout		7,363	66.3	+23.4
Labour hold		Swing		
Labour hold		Swing		
Labour hold		Swing		

=== Edgware ===
Edgware (3 seats)
Party	Candidate	Votes	%	±%
Conservative	Darrel Yawitch*	3,917	52.2	−0.7
Conservative	Helena Hart*	3,784	50.4	+0.2
Conservative	Joan Scannell*	3,673	48.9	+0.3
Labour	John Johnston	2,152	28.7	+6.0
Labour	Parmodh Sharma	1,718	22.9	−2.8
Labour	Nagus Narenthira	1,686	22.5	+1.9
Liberal Democrats	Eli Abeles	1,044	13.9	−7.8
Liberal Democrats	Aliza Abeles	988	13.2	−3.2
Liberal Democrats	Sheila Gottsche	750	10.0	−6.2
Residents' Association	Linda Edwards	627	8.4	N/A
Green	Romola de Souza	311	4.1	−2.5
Green	Aharon Hasin	197	2.6	N/A
Green	Jane Lithgow	190	2.5	−1.3
Turnout		7,507	67.0	+27.8
Conservative hold		Swing		
Conservative hold		Swing		
Conservative hold		Swing		

=== Finchley Church End ===
Finchley Church End (3 seats)
Party	Candidate	Votes	%	±%
Conservative	Eva Greenspan*	3,833	54.0	−9.4
Conservative	Dan Thomas*	3,403	48.0	−10.5
Conservative	Graham Old	3,340	47.1	−14.8
Labour	Oliver Segal*	1,696	23.9	+5.5
Labour	Mary McGuirk	1,652	23.3	+6.2
Labour	Arjun Mittra	1,515	21.4	+4.6
Liberal Democrats	Malcolm Davis	1,040	14.7	+1.9
Liberal Democrats	Diana Darrer	952	13.4	+1.0
Liberal Democrats	Sheila Yarwood	771	10.9	+0.3
Green	Paul Dunn	441	6.2	−7.6
Residents' Association	Estelle Phillips	341	4.8	N/A
Green	Donald Lyven	336	4.7	N/A
Residents' Association	Roger Enskat	324	4.6	N/A
Residents' Association	Brian Ross	321	4.5	N/A
Green	Andrew Shirlaw	283	4.0	N/A
Turnout		7,092	67.1	+24.3
Conservative hold		Swing		
Conservative hold		Swing		
Conservative hold		Swing		

=== Garden Suburb ===
Garden Suburb (3 seats)
Party	Candidate	Votes	%	±%
Conservative	John Marshall*	4,243	57.4	+3.8
Conservative	Andrew Harper*	4,204	56.9	+5.8
Conservative	Daniel Seal	3,976	53.8	+6.0
Liberal Democrats	Naomi Byrne	1,525	20.6	−17.1
Labour	Janet Solomons	1,339	18.1	+7.9
Liberal Democrats	Peter Lusher	1,259	17.0	−14.6
Labour	Tony Boulton	1,216	16.5	+6.3
Labour	Cordy McNeil	1,116	15.1	+7.9
Liberal Democrats	Simon Motz	1,100	14.9	−16.0
Green	Ivor Jaswon	761	10.3	+1.2
Turnout		7,390	70.9	+24.6
Conservative hold		Swing		
Conservative hold		Swing		
Conservative hold		Swing		

=== Golders Green ===
Golders Green (3 seats)
Party	Candidate	Votes	%	±%
Conservative	Dean Cohen*	3,259	53.0	−5.2
Conservative	Melvin Cohen*	3,051	49.6	−9.9
Conservative	Reuben Thompstone	2,516	40.9	−17.5
Labour	David Robinson	1,451	23.6	+4.4
Labour	Paul Levine	1,446	23.5	+7.1
Labour	Margot Robinson	1,354	22.0	+6.5
Liberal Democrats	Ruth Cohen	885	14.4	+2.8
Liberal Democrats	Weng Ang	857	13.9	+2.7
Liberal Democrats	Honora Morrissey	703	11.4	+1.8
Residents' Association	Dorothy Badrick	408	6.6	−4.2
Residents' Association	Eunice Oyeyele	284	4.6	N/A
Green	Michelle Lynch	257	4.2	N/A
Green	Dolores Incenzo	241	3.9	−5.3
Green	Andrew Saffrey	231	3.8	N/A
Turnout		6,149	57.5	+20.8
Conservative hold		Swing		
Conservative hold		Swing		
Conservative hold		Swing		

=== Hale ===
Hale (3 seats)
Party	Candidate	Votes	%	±%
Conservative	Thomas Davey*	3,384	43.4	−3.2
Conservative	Brian Gordon*	3,380	43.3	−4.1
Conservative	Hugh Rayner*	3,174	40.7	−2.3
Labour	Eileen Doyle	2,706	34.7	−2.6
Labour	Daniel Elton	2,274	29.2	−7.7
Labour	Hayes Rees	1,989	25.5	−10.3
Liberal Democrats	James Creighton	1,279	16.4	+5.6
Liberal Democrats	Michael Goodman	1,238	15.9	+5.9
Liberal Democrats	Geoffrey Jacobs	1,008	12.9	+2.2
Residents' Association	Derek French	466	6.0	N/A
Green	Richard Askew	334	4.3	N/A
Green	Paul Homer	240	3.1	N/A
Green	David Lake	203	2.6	−4.8
Turnout		7,799	66.7	+20.9
Conservative hold		Swing		
Conservative hold		Swing		
Conservative hold		Swing		

=== Hendon ===
Hendon (3 seats)
Party	Candidate	Votes	%	±%
Conservative	Mark Shooter	3,366	51.9	−0.7
Conservative	Anthony Finn*	3,345	51.6	−3.7
Conservative	Maureen Braun*	3,115	48.1	−5.2
Labour	Linda Attwood	1,692	26.1	+9.8
Labour	David Beere	1,636	25.2	+10.4
Labour	Pierre Jeanmaire	1,612	24.9	+7.3
Liberal Democrats	Jonathan Davies	874	13.5	−10.0
Liberal Democrats	Jason Moleman	804	12.4	−9.4
Liberal Democrats	Anoushka Fernandes-Vidal	765	11.8	−8.8
Green	Manisha Abeyasinghe	319	4.9	N/A
Green	Jennifer Goodman	313	4.8	N/A
Green	Pablo de Mello	230	3.5	−4.0
Turnout		6,482	57.0	+22.4
Conservative hold		Swing		
Conservative hold		Swing		
Conservative hold		Swing		

=== High Barnet ===
High Barnet (3 seats)
Party	Candidate	Votes	%	±%
Conservative	Wendy Prentice*	3,499	44.6	−0.5
Conservative	Bridget Perry*	3,469	44.2	−0.5
Conservative	David Longstaff	3,290	41.9	+0.5
Liberal Democrats	Duncan MacDonald*	2,505	31.9	−10.7
Liberal Democrats	Sean Hooker	2,436	31.0	−10.9
Liberal Democrats	Jonty Stern	1,928	24.6	−14.3
Labour	Sue Russell	1,238	15.8	+6.5
Labour	Philip Harding	1,233	15.7	+8.1
Labour	Erach Amaria	1,136	14.5	+7.5
Green	Maggie Curati	661	8.4	−0.9
Green	Richard Hewison	578	7.4	N/A
Green	Tim Riley	421	5.4	N/A
Turnout		7,852	71.3	+21.3
Conservative hold		Swing		
Conservative hold		Swing		
Conservative gain from Liberal Democrats		Swing		

=== Mill Hill ===
Mill Hill (3 seats)
Party	Candidate	Votes	%	±%
Conservative	John Hart*	3,969	48.0	+7.5
Conservative	Sury Khatri	3,563	43.1	+3.5
Conservative	Brian Schama	3,513	42.5	+3.2
Liberal Democrats	Jeremy Davies*	2,507	30.3	−12.6
Liberal Democrats	Kim Checchetto	2,342	28.3	−15.1
Liberal Democrats	Roger Tichborne	2,260	27.3	−8.7
Labour	Stephen Curtis	1,461	17.7	+7.7
Labour	Will Parnaby	1,402	17.0	+4.6
Labour	Agnes Macauley	1,221	14.8	+2.7
Green	Dilan Kurt	385	4.7	−5.0
Green	David Williams	304	3.7	N/A
Green	Dilem Kurt	245	3.0	N/A
Turnout		8.268	66.0	+21.6
Conservative hold		Swing		
Conservative gain from Liberal Democrats		Swing		
Conservative gain from Liberal Democrats		Swing		

=== Oakleigh ===
Oakleigh (3 seats)
Party	Candidate	Votes	%	±%
Conservative	Brian Salinger*	3,814	49.4	−2.7
Conservative	Sachin Rajput*	3,612	46.8	−2.0
Conservative	Stephen Sowerby	3,586	46.5	−4.3
Labour	Sylvia Grant	1,734	22.5	+9.2
Liberal Democrats	Jon Finlayson	1,711	22.2	−6.3
Labour	Brenda Sandford	1,695	22.0	+9.1
Labour	Gordon Massey	1,585	20.5	+9.6
Liberal Democrats	David Keech	1,543	20.0	−7.4
Liberal Democrats	Adele Winston	1,473	19.1	−8.5
Independent	Philip Clayton	551	7.1	N/A
Turnout		7,719	67.1	+22.4
Conservative hold		Swing		
Conservative hold		Swing		
Conservative hold		Swing		

=== Totteridge ===
Totteridge (3 seats)
Party	Candidate	Votes	%	±%
Conservative	Alison Cornelius*	3,739	53.5	−0.5
Conservative	Brian Coleman*	3,705	53.0	−4.7
Conservative	Richard Cornelius*	3,570	51.1	−6.6
Labour	Pamela Bradbury	1,469	21.0	+6.9
Labour	Oliver Deed	1,331	19.1	+6.0
Liberal Democrats	Alexander Gilbert	1,317	18.9	+2.6
Labour	Fred Jarvis	1,303	18.7	+6.8
Liberal Democrats	Joan Waller	1,150	16.5	+1.8
Liberal Democrats	Elizabeth Wills	1,072	15.3	N/A
Green	Julie Rosenfield	516	7.4	−8.7
Green	Katie Margolis	437	6.3	N/A
Green	Paul Vassalli	252	3.6	N/A
Turnout		6,985	68.1	+25.6
Conservative hold		Swing		
Conservative hold		Swing		
Conservative hold		Swing		

=== Underhill ===
Underhill (3 seats)
Party	Candidate	Votes	%	±%
Labour	Anita Campbell*	2,761	38.0	−4.3
Conservative	Rowan Turner	2,676	36.8	−4.8
Conservative	Andrew Strongolou	2,628	36.2	−3.4
Conservative	Daniel Webb*	2,608	35.9	−3.8
Labour	Tim Roberts	2,251	31.0	−7.3
Labour	Matthew Worth	2,166	29.8	−9.3
Liberal Democrats	David Nowell	1,386	19.1	+4.7
Liberal Democrats	Michael Cole	1,362	18.7	+6.7
Liberal Democrats	Pauline McKinnell	1,302	17.9	+7.1
Green	Georgia Theodorou	669	9.2	−0.5
Green	Solomon Natelson	461	6.3	N/A
Turnout		7,266	63.8	+15.3
Labour hold		Swing		
Conservative hold		Swing		
Conservative hold		Swing		

=== West Finchley ===
West Finchley (3 seats)
Party	Candidate	Votes	%	±%
Labour	Ross Houston*	2,758	40.2	−1.5
Labour	Jim Tierney*	2,744	40.0	+0.2
Labour	Kath McGuirk*	2,668	38.9	+0.3
Conservative	Myles Longfield	2,197	32.0	−5.5
Conservative	Henry Morris	2,059	30.0	−7.1
Conservative	David Leighton	2,025	29.5	−7.2
Liberal Democrats	Ron Finlay	1,348	19.7	+5.8
Liberal Democrats	Rita Landeryou	1,290	18.8	+5.5
Liberal Democrats	Deborah Warland	1,117	16.3	+3.9
Green	John Colmans	807	11.8	−3.2
Residents' Association	Mike Gee	348	5.1	−9.9
Turnout		6,860	63.6	+18.9
Labour hold		Swing		
Labour hold		Swing		
Labour hold		Swing		

=== West Hendon ===
West Hendon (3 seats)
Party	Candidate	Votes	%	±%
Labour	Julie Johnson*	2,678	42.6	−4.5
Labour	Agnes Slocombe*	2,594	41.3	−3.7
Labour	Ansuya Sodha*	2,353	37.4	−5.9
Conservative	Asher Bornstein	2,293	36.5	+3.0
Conservative	Lisa Gamsu-Fachler	2,134	33.9	+2.8
Conservative	Adrian Murray-Leonard	2,130	33.9	+4.4
Liberal Democrats	James Emery	748	11.9	−2.3
Liberal Democrats	Pearl Emery	683	10.9	−1.6
Liberal Democrats	Diana Iwi	600	9.5	−0.7
Independent	Ferdoos Amin	387	6.2	N/A
Green	Ben Samuel	356	5.7	−5.4
Green	Miriam Green	323	5.1	N/A
Green	Sara Bunting	289	4.6	N/A
Turnout		6,287	58.7	+23.2
Labour hold		Swing		
Labour hold		Swing		
Labour hold		Swing		

=== Woodhouse ===
Woodhouse (3 seats)
Party	Candidate	Votes	%	±%
Labour	Anne Hutton*	3,004	40.0	−3.2
Labour	Geof Cooke*	2,950	39.3	−4.3
Labour	Alan Schneiderman*	2,687	35.8	−3.1
Conservative	Manish Depala	2,456	32.7	−3.5
Conservative	Matthew Knight	2,358	31.4	−4.2
Conservative	Anshul Gupta	2,139	28.5	−6.4
Liberal Democrats	Deborah Granville	1,474	19.6	+6.5
Liberal Democrats	Dudley Miles	1,313	17.5	+6.7
Liberal Democrats	Ian Murphy	1,257	16.7	+1.7
Green	David Burns	527	7.0	N/A
Green	Gardi Vaswani	397	5.3	−8.5
Green	Matthew Wimborne	315	4.2	N/A
Turnout		7,506	63.1	+17.8
Labour hold		Swing		
Labour hold		Swing		
Labour hold		Swing		

== By-elections between 2010 and 2014 ==
=== East Finchley ===
East Finchley by-election, 12 April 2012
Party	Candidate	Votes	%	±%
Labour	Arjun Mittra	2,117	67.8	+28.0
Conservative	Anshul Gupta	543	17.4	−9.7
Liberal Democrats	Jane Gibson	461	14.8	−8.8
Majority		1,574	50.4	
Turnout		3,141	28	
Labour hold		Swing		

The by-election was called following the resignation of Cllr Andrew McNeil on 22 February. At the previous election, the Green Party candidate had polled 8.5% of votes cast.

=== Brunswick Park ===
Brunswick Park by-election, 31 May 2012
Party	Candidate	Votes	%	±%
Labour	Andreas Ioannidis	1,769	51.1	+24.4
Conservative	Shaheen Mahmood	1,598	46.1	+1.8
Liberal Democrats	Yahaya Kiingi	97	2.8	−14.5
Majority		171	5.0	
Turnout		3,464		
Labour gain from Conservative		Swing		

The by-election was called following the death of Cllr Lynne Hillan on 5 April.
