= Eugene Stepanenko =

Ukrainian stage and film director, screenwriter

Eugene Stepanenko KBE OMRI
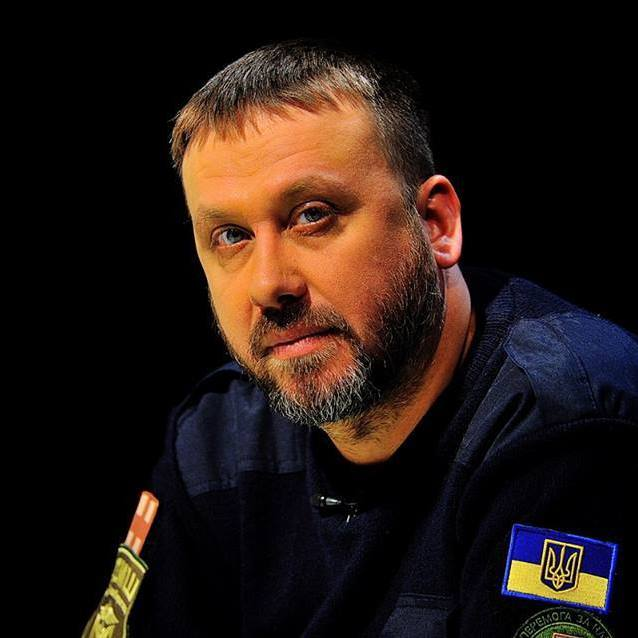
- Born: August 5, 1974 (age 51); Korsun-Shevchenkivskyi, Ukrainian SSR, Soviet Union
- Occupations: Director, producer, screenwriter, TV-host

Eugene Stepanenko (born August 5, 1974) is a Ukrainian stage and film director, screenwriter, producer, teacher and TV-host. Stepanenko resides in Kyiv, Ukraine, after living in Paris, France and Saint Petersburg, Russia.

== Early life ==
Stepanenko too a one-year course on documentary film in La Femis film school in Paris, France. He studied screenwriting and directing under Alexei German and Svetlana Karmalita in St. Petersburg, Russia.

== Career ==
He worked in St. Petersburg, Georgia and Ukraine, including for the St. Petersburg Documentary Film Studio. His projects appeared on Discovery channel, RTR, Channel 5, TV 100 – St. Petersburg, PIK – Georgia, Inter, NTN, Channel 5 – Ukraine, UA First and ICTV.

During the beginning of the War in Donbass, he served in the Ukraine Special Forces and participated in the airport battles in Donetsk, Mariupol, Debaltsevo. Stepaneko was one of the organisers of Defense Mariupol in September 2014. He served in a special operations center after an injury. He was one of the founders of Pirogov First Voluntary mobile hospital. The tasks of the hospital are humanitarian missions to assist military and civilian populations in the conflict zone. During 1.5 years of operation, the hospital assisted about 4,500 patients.

After the service, he engaged in documentary theater. He created war-related productions, trying to understand its causes and the changes in people's minds.

After completing his military service, he founded Production Center ltd, a company engaged in film production, creating series projects for Ukrainian and Russian TV channels. Stepanenko is known for his films about war and peace, including Debaltsevo and Reservists, and performances Airport (based on the book by Sergei Loiko) and Kotel.

The director produces documentary films and documentary theater.

He cohosts War and Peace with Yuri Makarov on TV channel UA:Pershiy.

Stepanenko is married and has two children.

== Filmography and theatrical productions ==
- 2000 – Filming of commercials for "Chevrolet", "Honda", "Nivea" and a number of local customers (director).
- 2003 – The play "Love Lace" by Ostrovsky. Youth Theatre on Fontanka, St. Petersburg (stage director).
- 2003 – "Foreign Petersburg" film. Studio LenDokfilm (director).
- 2004–2006 – The cycle of documentary films "Letters from the province" for RTR culture TV-channel (director).
- 2005–2006 – The cycle of documentary films "Just people" for channel "TV 100 St. Petersburg" (director).
- 2005 – The documentary film "Komi Roig" commissioned by the Russian Ethnographic Museum (director).
- 2005 – The documentary "Ijma" broadcast on TV 5 France (director).
- 2006 – The cycle of documentary films "Our mova" broadcast on 3 national channels (director).
- 2008 – The theatrical production of "Children's Garden" on the play by Andrei Kureichik in "Small Drama Theatre Kyiv" (stage director).
- 2011 – The documentary "9/11 – 10 years" on the TV channel Inter (director).
- 2013 – Reality show "The reservists" broadcasting on 2 national channels (the author of the original idea and the director).
- 2015 – Performance "Kotel", a documentary play based on the events in Illovaysk (director).
- 2015 – Staging "The Airport" by Sergei Loiko. Premiere was in Ivan Franko theater, a TV version of the show broadcast on Channel 5 Ukraine and 1 National TV channel (stage director).
- 2016 – Documentary film "Debaltsevo". National premiere was in Ukraine with the participation of the President of Ukraine and a simultaneous display of 6 national Ukraina TV channels & 12 country (director).
- 2016 – Documentary film about Ukrainian cyborg Igor Branovitsky devoted to Independent Day of Ukraine (director).
- 2017 – currently working on an international theater project "Decomposition", performance "Taras Shevchenko", documentary movie "The wings".
