= Stepan Stepanenko =

British political analyst and archaeologist

- Education: University of York (MA by Research); École Pratique des Hautes Études (PhD)
- Occupations: Political analyst, archaeologist
- Known for: Research on medieval Eastern Europe; political analysis of Russia–Ukraine relations
- Awards: Alexander von Humboldt Foundation Research Fellowship

Stepan Stepanenko is a British political analyst and archaeologist. His academic research has focused on the archaeology of medieval Eastern Europe, particularly the Chernihiv region. He is affiliated with the CNRS and the Leibniz-Zentrum für Archäologie (LEIZA) in Mainz, where his work has examined settlement patterns and material culture in the 9th–11th centuries.

Stepanenko has also written on Russian, Ukrainian, and Belarusian affairs. His analysis has been covered internationally, including in iNews and the Danish newspaper Kristeligt Dagblad. He has also contributed opinion articles to LBC and the Kyiv Post.

== Early life and education ==
Stepanenko earned a Master of Arts by Research in Archaeology from the University of York. He later completed a PhD at the École Pratique des Hautes Études (PSL Research University, Paris). He was awarded a Humboldt Research Fellowship in Germany.

== Academic career ==
Stepanenko has researched the archaeology of the Chernihiv region and wider Eastern Europe. He edited the volume A Viking Century: Chernihiv area from 900 to 1000 AD in the Hlib Ivakin memorial series, which brought together new studies on chronology, settlement, and material culture.

His academic work has also addressed cultural heritage and the illicit trade of antiquities during the war in Ukraine, including evidence to the UK Parliament on looting practices and Russian involvement, and discussion at the Henry Jackson Society.

In 2025, he convened the international conference Linking Worlds: 9–11th Century Baltic and Black Sea Trade and Communications through Western Ukraine and Eastern Poland, held at the Leibniz-Zentrum für Archäologie in Mainz and supported by the DFG, CNRS, and the Humboldt Foundation.

== Political and analytical work ==
In 2023, Stepanenko briefly served as a member of the Coordination Council of the Belarusian opposition.

He has worked as a research fellow at the Henry Jackson Society, and has submitted written evidence on defence and foreign policy to the UK Parliament, some co-authored with Major General (Rtd) John Holmes. His submissions have been cited in reports of the House of Commons and House of Lords.

His work has also addressed UK involvement in Central Asia and the strategic significance of the Middle Corridor, publishing a policy report on the subject. Coverage of his analysis appeared in Kazakh and UK media, including The Astana Times, Kazinform, and FBJ-Online.

On 19 August 2024, he was included on the Russian government sanctions list.

=== Politics ===
In 2014, Stepanenko stood as a Conservative Party candidate for the East Finchley ward in the Barnet London Borough Council election. He received 1,013 votes but was not elected.

== Media ==
Stepanenko has been cited in UK and international outlets including iNews, Kristeligt Dagblad, and The Astana Times, and has appeared as a commentator on GB News, TalkTV, and LBC radio.

== Selected publications ==
- A Viking Century: Chernihiv area from 900 to 1000 AD (ed., 2022).

== Recognition ==
- Alexander von Humboldt Foundation Research Fellowship.
- Included on the Russian government sanctions list, 19 August 2024.
