= 2014 Barnet London Borough Council election =

2014 local election in England

- 22 May 2014

All 63 seats to Barnet London Borough Council 32 seats needed for a majority

	First party	Second party	Third party
Party	Conservative	Labour	Liberal Democrats
Seats won	32	30	1
Seat change	▼7	▲9	▼2
Popular vote	38,286	36,076	8,037
Percentage	38.6%	36.4%	8.1%
Swing	▼2.2%	▲6.2%	▼11.5%
- Map of the results of the 2014 Barnet council election. Conservatives in blue, Labour in red and Liberal Democrats in yellow.
Council control before election
Conservative Party (UK)
Council control after election
Conservative Party (UK)

The 2014 Barnet Borough Council election took place on 22 May 2014 to elect members of Barnet Council in England. It took place on the same day as other local elections and it resulted in the Conservative Party holding on to overall control of the council.

== Background ==
Before the election the Conservatives ran the council with 38 seats, compared to 22 for Labour and 3 for the Liberal Democrats. A total of 247 candidates stood in the election including a full slate of 63 each from the Conservative, Labour and Liberal Democrat parties. The Green Party stood 43 candidates, while there were 9 candidates from UKIP, 5 Independents and 1 from Left Unity. Following the death of Green Party candidate Jessica Yorke, the poll for Colindale ward was cancelled on 19 May and rescheduled to take place on 26 June.

== Election result ==
Barnet local election result 2014
Party	Seats	Gains	Losses	Net gain/loss	Seats %	Votes %	Votes	+/−
Conservative	32	0	7	-7	53.3	38.6	38,286	-2.2
Labour	30	9	0	+9	45.0	36.4	36,076	+6.2
Green	0	0	0	0	0.0	10.9	10,800	+4.7
Liberal Democrats	1	0	2	-2	1.7	8.1	8,037	-11.5
UKIP	0	0	0	0	0.0	4.8	4,780	New
Independent	0	0	0	0	0.0	1.1	1,127	+0.5
Left Unity	0	0	0	0	0.0	0.1	107	New

^{Results for Colindale included in table.}

== Ward results ==
=== Brunswick Park ===
Brunswick Park (3 seats)
Party	Candidate	Votes	%	±%
Labour	Kathy Levine	1,951	40.9	+14.2
Labour	Andreas Ioannidis*	1,944	40.7	+14.8
Conservative	Lisa Rutter*	1,899	39.8	−5.1
Conservative	Andreas Tambourides*	1,876	39.3	−7.5
Labour	James Rowe	1,820	38.1	+14.6
Conservative	Antonis Savvides	1,742	36.5	−7.8
Green	Howard Javes	499	10.4	+4.9
Liberal Democrats	Sandra Beeton	270	5.7	−11.6
Liberal Democrats	Jennifer Ritson	218	4.6	−11.7
Liberal Democrats	Sakura Otten	168	3.5	−10.8
Total votes		4,776		
Labour gain from Conservative		Swing		
Labour hold		Swing		
Conservative hold		Swing		

=== Burnt Oak ===
Burnt Oak (3 seats)
Party	Candidate	Votes	%	±%
Labour	Claire Farrier*	2,622	63.8	+4.8
Labour	Charlie O’Macauley*	2,223	54.1	+0.3
Labour	Ammar Naqvi	2,177	53.0	−5.6
Conservative	Lachhya Gurung	889	21.6	−0.3
Conservative	John Connolly	854	20.8	+0.1
Conservative	Richa Karnani	651	15.8	−3.8
Green	Maggie Curati	447	10.9	N/A
Independent	Bidemi Alabi	328	8.0	N/A
Liberal Democrats	Michael Roberts	286	7.0	−6.0
Liberal Democrats	Diana Iwi	242	5.9	−8.9
Liberal Democrats	Yahaya Kiyingi	152	3.7	−9.0
Total votes		4,110		
Labour hold		Swing		
Labour hold		Swing		
Labour hold		Swing		

=== Childs Hill ===
Childs Hill (3 seats)
Party	Candidate	Votes	%	±%
Conservative	Shimon Ryde	1,544	32.8	−0.9
Conservative	Peter Zinkin	1,536	32.6	−0.7
Liberal Democrats	Jack Cohen*	1,509	32.0	−6.2
Conservative	Rohit Grover	1,500	31.8	−0.3
Labour	Andrew Smith	1,463	31.0	+7.4
Labour	Ade Ajakaiye	1,408	29.9	+10.8
Labour	Nila Patel	1,381	29.3	+10.8
Liberal Democrats	Charlotte Henry	1,222	25.9	−11.2
Liberal Democrats	Jonathan Davies	1,198	25.4	−10.0
Green	Francesco Marasco	501	10.6	+3.9
Total votes		4,712		
Conservative gain from Liberal Democrats		Swing		
Conservative gain from Liberal Democrats		Swing		
Liberal Democrats hold		Swing		

=== Colindale (delayed election) ===
Colindale (3 seats)
Party	Candidate	Votes	%	±%
Labour	Nagus Narenthira	2,190	68.4	+10.7
Labour	Gill Sargeant*	2,088	65.2	+15.0
Labour	Zakia Zubairi*	2,015	62.9	+14.9
Conservative	Nneka Akwaeze	501	15.6	−5.2
Conservative	John Nicholson	466	14.5	−6.3
Conservative	Golnar Bokaei	420	13.1	−4.9
UKIP	John Baskin	347	10.8	N/A
UKIP	Barry Ryan	309	9.6	N/A
UKIP	Khalid Khan	268	8.4	N/A
Liberal Democrats	Daniel Estermann	133	4.2	−15.2
Green	Maggie Curati	130	4.1	−1.9
Green	Andrew Newby	114	3.6	−1.8
Green	Francesco Marasco	108	3.4	−1.5
Liberal Democrats	Victor Corney	90	2.8	−13.1
Liberal Democrats	Sabriye Warsame	87	2.7	−10.8
Total votes		3,203		
Labour hold		Swing		
Labour hold		Swing		
Labour hold		Swing		

=== Coppetts ===
Coppetts (3 seats)
Party	Candidate	Votes	%	±%
Labour	Barry Rawlings*	2,256	47.9	+10.6
Labour	Pauline Coakley-Webb*	2,201	46.7	+10.9
Labour	Reema Patel	2,179	46.2	+11.8
Conservative	Kate Salinger*	1,517	32.2	−3.9
Conservative	Lorna Green	1,355	28.7	−4.5
Conservative	Andreas Nicolaides	1,277	27.1	−4.0
Green	Rebecca Bunting	640	13.6	+7.1
Green	Edward Bunting	544	11.5	+1.6
Green	Andrew Newby	469	9.9	+4.4
Liberal Democrats	David Bullen	218	4.6	−14.5
Liberal Democrats	Enrique Boo	197	4.2	−12.6
Independent	Mehdi Akhavan	163	3.5	N/A
Liberal Democrats	Melvyn Rees	153	3.2	−11.5
Total votes		4,714		
Labour hold		Swing		
Labour hold		Swing		
Labour gain from Conservative		Swing		

=== East Barnet ===
East Barnet (3 seats)
Party	Candidate	Votes	%	±%
Labour	Rebecca Challice	2,108	43.1	+21.2
Labour	Laurie Williams	2,044	41.8	+21.4
Labour	Philip Cohen	1,993	40.7	+20.5
Conservative	Barry Evangeli*	1,894	38.7	+1.8
Conservative	Joanna Tambourides*	1,873	38.3	+0.6
Conservative	Robert Rams*	1,820	37.2	+0.4
Green	Roger Aitken	638	13.0	+7.1
Green	Pennie Varvarides	576	11.8	+6.6
Green	Kevin Pressland	505	10.3	N/A
Liberal Democrats	Deborah Roberts	194	4.0	−13.6
Liberal Democrats	Eileen Umbo	175	3.6	−11.5
Liberal Democrats	Joe Giltinane	173	3.5	−11.0
Total votes		4,892		
Labour gain from Conservative		Swing		
Labour gain from Conservative		Swing		
Labour gain from Conservative		Swing		

=== East Finchley ===
East Finchley (3 seats)
Party	Candidate	Votes	%	±%
Labour	Alison Moore*	2,711	57.5	+12.5
Labour	Arjun Mittra*	2,565	54.4	+14.6
Labour	Alon Or-Bach	2,201	46.7	+7.7
Conservative	Stepan Stepanenko	1,013	21.5	−5.6
Conservative	Anshul Gupta	988	20.9	−4.3
Conservative	Alan Maund	988	20.9	−2.5
Green	Noel Lynch	640	13.6	+4.7
Green	Stephen Norman	606	12.8	+4.8
Green	David Mellows	602	12.8	+6.3
Liberal Democrats	Joyce Arram	410	8.7	−14.9
Liberal Democrats	Malcolm Davis	310	6.6	−12.4
Liberal Democrats	Millicent Watkins	248	5.3	−11.5
Total votes		4,717		
Labour hold		Swing		
Labour hold		Swing		
Labour hold		Swing		

=== Edgware ===
Edgware (3 seats)
Party	Candidate	Votes	%	±%
Conservative	Brian Gordon	2,732	61.0	+8.8
Conservative	Helena Hart*	2,369	52.9	+2.5
Conservative	Joan Scannell*	2,182	48.7	−0.2
Labour	Julie Johnson	1,180	26.4	−2.3
Labour	Geoffrey Johnson	1,155	25.8	+2.9
Labour	Raymond Hale	1,140	25.5	+3.0
Green	Catherine Margolis	474	10.6	+6.5
Liberal Democrats	Aliza Abeles	446	10.0	−3.2
Liberal Democrats	Elias Abeles	410	9.2	−4.7
Liberal Democrats	Alexander Ollier	169	3.8	−6.2
Total votes		4,476		
Conservative hold		Swing		
Conservative hold		Swing		
Conservative hold		Swing		

=== Finchley Church End ===
Finchley Church End (3 seats)
Party	Candidate	Votes	%	±%
Conservative	Eva Greenspan*	2,571	56.4	+2.4
Conservative	Graham Old*	2,284	50.1	+3.0
Conservative	Dan Thomas*	2,197	48.2	+0.2
Labour	Janet Bagley	1,257	27.6	+3.7
Labour	Mike Walsh	1,201	26.4	+5.0
Labour	Mary McGuirk	1,192	26.2	+2.9
Green	Vedantha Kumar	512	11.2	+5.0
UKIP	Amir Latif	365	8.0	N/A
Liberal Democrats	Diana Darrer	305	6.7	−6.7
Liberal Democrats	Sarah Hoyle	267	5.9	−8.8
Liberal Democrats	Sheila Yarwood	222	4.9	−6.0
Total votes		4,556		
Conservative hold		Swing		
Conservative hold		Swing		
Conservative hold		Swing		

=== Garden Suburb ===
Garden Suburb (3 seats)
Party	Candidate	Votes	%	±%
Conservative	John Marshall*	2,689	59.1	+1.7
Conservative	Gabriel Rozenberg	2,560	56.3	−0.6
Conservative	Daniel Seal*	2,539	55.8	+2.0
Labour	Nick Goldberg	1,110	24.4	+6.3
Labour	Ruth Brown	1,101	24.2	+7.7
Labour	Romin Sutherland	943	20.7	+5.6
Green	Romola De-Souza	645	14.2	+3.9
Liberal Democrats	Peter Lusher	382	8.4	−8.6
Liberal Democrats	Altan Akbiyik	358	7.9	−12.7
Liberal Democrats	Stephen Barber	347	7.6	−7.3
Total votes		4,550		
Conservative hold		Swing		
Conservative hold		Swing		
Conservative hold		Swing		

=== Golders Green ===
Golders Green (3 seats)
Party	Candidate	Votes	%	±%
Conservative	Dean Cohen*	2,423	61.4	+8.4
Conservative	Melvin Cohen*	2,302	58.3	+8.7
Conservative	Reuben Thompstone*	1,831	46.4	+5.5
Labour	Charles Harvey	1,024	25.9	+2.3
Labour	Margot Robinson	900	22.8	+0.8
Labour	Sue O`Halloran	885	22.4	−1.1
Green	Charlene Concepcion	369	9.3	+5.1
Green	Adele Ward	330	8.4	+4.5
Green	Louisa Radice	314	8.0	+4.2
Liberal Democrats	Ruth Cohen	246	6.2	−8.2
Liberal Democrats	Honora Morrissey	156	4.0	−7.4
Liberal Democrats	Eddie Eatwell	126	3.2	−10.7
Total votes		3,948		
Conservative hold		Swing		
Conservative hold		Swing		
Conservative hold		Swing		

=== Hale ===
Hale (3 seats)
Party	Candidate	Votes	%	±%
Conservative	Tom Davey*	2,178	43.8	+0.4
Conservative	Hugh Rayner*	2,155	43.4	+2.7
Labour	Kitty Lyons	2,019	40.6	+5.9
Conservative	Elliot Simberg	2,010	40.5	−2.8
Labour	Pierre Jeanmaire	1,994	40.1	+10.9
Labour	Roger Lyons	1,870	37.6	+12.1
Green	Nicolas Ceasar	536	10.8	+6.5
Liberal Democrats	Michael Goodman	335	6.7	−9.2
Liberal Democrats	James Creighton	297	6.0	−10.4
Liberal Democrats	Geoffrey Jacobs	243	4.9	−8.0
Total votes		4,968		
Conservative hold		Swing		
Conservative hold		Swing		
Labour gain from Conservative		Swing		

=== Hendon ===
Hendon (3 seats)
Party	Candidate	Votes	%	±%
Conservative	Anthony Finn*	2,128	51.0	−0.6
Conservative	Mark Shooter*	2,087	50.1	−1.8
Conservative	Maureen Braun*	2,015	48.3	+0.2
Labour	David Beere	1,191	28.6	+3.4
Labour	Gerrard Roots	1,165	27.9	+1.8
Labour	Ruth Montague	1,113	26.7	+1.8
UKIP	Barry Ryan	420	10.1	N/A
Green	Andy Monaghan	390	9.4	+4.5
Liberal Democrats	Jason Moleman	280	6.7	−5.7
Liberal Democrats	Henryk Feszczur	243	5.8	−7.7
Liberal Democrats	Charles Wakefield	180	4.3	−7.5
Total votes		4,169		
Conservative hold		Swing		
Conservative hold		Swing		
Conservative hold		Swing		

=== High Barnet ===
High Barnet (3 seats)
Party	Candidate	Votes	%	±%
Conservative	Wendy Prentice*	2,171	41.3	−3.3
Conservative	David Longstaff*	2,161	41.1	−0.8
Conservative	Bridget Perry*	2,152	41.0	−3.2
Labour	Phil Harding	1,209	23.0	+7.3
Labour	Marianne Haylett	1,188	22.6	+6.8
Labour	Paul Levine	1,052	20.0	+5.5
Green	Phil Fletcher	973	18.5	+10.1
Green	A. M. Poppy	922	17.5	+10.1
Liberal Democrats	Duncan MacDonald	859	16.3	−15.6
Green	Valerie Lawson	828	15.8	+10.4
Liberal Democrats	Sean Hooker	705	13.4	−17.6
Liberal Democrats	Jane Gibson	631	12.0	−12.6
Total votes		5,255		
Conservative hold		Swing		
Conservative hold		Swing		
Conservative hold		Swing		

=== Mill Hill ===
Mill Hill (3 seats)
Party	Candidate	Votes	%	±%
Conservative	John Hart*	2,058	41.9	−6.1
Conservative	Val Duschinsky	1,936	39.4	−3.1
Conservative	Sury Khatri*	1,864	38.0	−5.1
Labour	Deborah Handley	1,264	25.8	+8.1
Labour	Sian John	1,231	25.1	+8.1
Labour	Colin Francome	1,229	25.0	+10.2
UKIP	George Jones	731	14.9	N/A
Liberal Democrats	Jeremy Davies	721	14.7	−15.6
Liberal Democrats	Alasdair Hill	512	10.4	−17.9
Green	Barbara Rustin	495	10.1	+5.4
Liberal Democrats	Michael Lees	470	9.6	−17.7
Independent	Rolf Clayton	371	7.6	N/A
Green	Luke Ilott	282	5.7	+2.7
Green	David Williams	228	4.6	+0.9
Total votes		4,908		
Conservative hold		Swing		
Conservative hold		Swing		
Conservative hold		Swing		

=== Oakleigh ===
Oakleigh (3 seats)
Party	Candidate	Votes	%	±%
Conservative	Brian Salinger*	1,935	41.6	−7.8
Conservative	Sachin Rajput*	1,899	40.8	−6.0
Conservative	Stephen Sowerby*	1,826	39.2	−7.3
Labour	Pamela Bradbury	1,110	23.9	+1.4
Labour	Rachel Barker	1,075	23.1	+1.1
Labour	Parmodh Sharma	936	20.1	−0.4
UKIP	Victor Kaye	498	10.7	N/A
Green	Richard Cutting	436	9.4	N/A
Green	Daniel Newby	370	8.0	N/A
Green	Gideon Shapiro	317	6.8	N/A
Liberal Democrats	Jon Finlayson	239	5.1	−17.1
Liberal Democrats	Gerard Fitzgerald	188	4.0	−16.0
Liberal Democrats	Leonie Hodge	187	4.0	−15.1
Left Unity	Philip Clayton	107	2.3	−4.8
Total votes		4,654		
Conservative hold		Swing		
Conservative hold		Swing		
Conservative hold		Swing		

=== Totteridge ===
Totteridge (3 seats)
Party	Candidate	Votes	%	±%
Conservative	Alison Cornelius*	2,210	52.2	−1.3
Conservative	Richard Cornelius*	2,147	50.7	−0.4
Conservative	Caroline Stock	2,090	49.3	−3.7
Labour	Deborah Heneghan	1,048	24.7	+3.7
Labour	Donald Lyven	912	21.5	+2.4
Labour	Robert Persad	798	18.8	+0.1
UKIP	Keith Fraser	494	11.7	N/A
Green	Ash Auld	464	11.0	+3.6
Green	Richard Parkinson	363	8.6	+2.3
Liberal Democrats	Janice Turner	320	7.6	−11.3
Independent	Brian Coleman*	265	6.3	−46.7
Liberal Democrats	Michael Cole	256	6.0	−10.5
Liberal Democrats	Sheila Gottsche	212	5.0	−10.3
Independent	George Linskey	137	3.2	N/A
Total votes		4,237		
Conservative hold		Swing		
Conservative hold		Swing		
Conservative hold		Swing		

=== Underhill ===
Underhill (3 seats)
Party	Candidate	Votes	%	±%
Labour	Paul Edwards	2,078	42.3	+4.3
Labour	Amy Trevethan	1,950	39.7	+9.9
Labour	Tim Roberts	1,889	38.4	+7.4
Conservative	James Barton	1,637	33.3	−2.9
Conservative	Rowan Turner*	1,429	29.1	−7.7
Conservative	Michael Subramaniyam	1,264	25.7	−10.2
UKIP	John Baskin	1,016	20.7	N/A
Green	Dawn Laughton	550	11.2	N/A
Green	Gina Theodorou	525	10.7	+1.5
Green	Solomon Natelson	344	7.0	+0.7
Liberal Democrats	Alexander Gilbert	232	4.7	−14.4
Liberal Democrats	Maria Manalo	170	3.5	−15.2
Liberal Democrats	Jonty Stern	162	3.3	−14.6
Total votes		4,918		
Labour hold		Swing		
Labour gain from Conservative		Swing		
Labour gain from Conservative		Swing		

=== West Finchley ===
West Finchley (3 seats)
Party	Candidate	Votes	%	±%
Labour	Ross Houston*	2,214	50.0	+9.8
Labour	Jim Tierney*	2,141	48.3	+8.3
Labour	Kath McGuirk*	2,113	47.7	+8.8
Conservative	Shaun Dias	1,367	30.9	+0.9
Conservative	Myles Longfield	1,292	29.2	−2.8
Conservative	Ajantha Tennakoon	1,067	24.1	−5.4
Green	Nina Owen	550	12.4	+0.6
Green	Tim Riley	440	9.9	N/A
UKIP	Ted Anderson	407	9.2	N/A
Liberal Democrats	Rita Landeryou	262	5.9	−12.9
Liberal Democrats	John Chalmers	238	5.4	−10.9
Liberal Democrats	Ronald Finlay	206	4.7	−15.0
Total votes		4,430		
Labour hold		Swing		
Labour hold		Swing		
Labour hold		Swing		

=== West Hendon ===
West Hendon (3 seats)
Party	Candidate	Votes	%	±%
Labour	Adam Langleben	1,794	42.3	−0.3
Labour	Devra Kay	1,769	41.7	+4.3
Labour	Agnes Slocombe*	1,747	41.2	−0.1
Conservative	Saira Hettiarachchi	1,488	35.1	−1.4
Conservative	Brian Mann	1,459	34.4	+0.5
Conservative	Ansuya Sodha*	1,357	32.0	−5.4
UKIP	Adrian Murray-Leonard	445	10.5	N/A
Green	Ben Samuel	307	7.2	+1.5
Green	Sara Bunting	300	7.1	+2.5
Green	Miriam Green	292	6.9	+1.8
Liberal Democrats	Pearl Emery	172	4.1	−6.8
Liberal Democrats	James Emery	163	3.8	−8.1
Liberal Democrats	David Ive	163	3.8	−5.7
Total votes		4,244		
Labour hold		Swing		
Labour hold		Swing		
Labour hold		Swing		

=== Woodhouse ===
Woodhouse (3 seats)
Party	Candidate	Votes	%	±%
Labour	Anne Hutton*	2,348	47.4	+7.4
Labour	Geof Cooke*	2,287	46.1	+6.8
Labour	Alan Schneiderman*	2,067	41.7	+5.9
Conservative	Mark Higgins	1,442	29.1	−3.6
Conservative	Mukesh Depala	1,350	27.2	−4.2
Conservative	Nurul Alam	1,318	26.6	−1.9
Green	Diane Burstein	604	12.2	+8.0
UKIP	Karl Khan	551	11.1	N/A
Green	David Burns	543	11.0	+4.0
Green	Gardi Vaswani	471	9.5	+4.2
Liberal Democrats	Ian Murphy	218	4.4	−12.3
Liberal Democrats	Pauline McKinnell	211	4.3	−15.3
Liberal Democrats	Lisa Smith	193	3.9	−13.6
Total votes		4,958		
Labour hold		Swing		
Labour hold		Swing		
Labour hold		Swing		

== By-elections between 2014 and 2018 ==
=== Underhill ===
Underhill by-election, 5 May 2016
Party	Candidate	Votes	%	±%
Labour	Jess Brayne	2,314	41.4	+1.7
Conservative	Lesley Evans	1,979	35.4	+2.1
UKIP	Barry Ryan	459	8.2	−12.5
Liberal Democrats	Duncan MacDonald	452	8.1	+3.4
Green	Phil Fletcher	387	6.9	−4.3
Majority		335	6.0	−0.4
Total votes		5,591		
Labour hold		Swing		

The by-election was called following the resignation of Cllr Amy Trevethan.
