= Barnet London Borough Council =

Local authority of Barnet in London

Barnet Council
- Coat of arms

- Council logo

Type
- Type: London borough council of the London Borough of Barnet
- Houses: Unicameral

History
- Founded: 1 April 1965

Leadership
- Mayor: Zahra Beg, Labour since 19 May 2026
- Leader: Barry Rawlings, Labour since 24 May 2022
- Chief Executive: Cath Shaw since June 2024

Structure
- Seats: 63 councillors
- Political groups: Minority administration Labour (31) Opposition parties Conservative (31) Green (1)
- Length of term: 4 years

Elections
- Voting system: First past the post
- Last election: 7 May 2026
- Next election: 2 May 2030

Meeting place
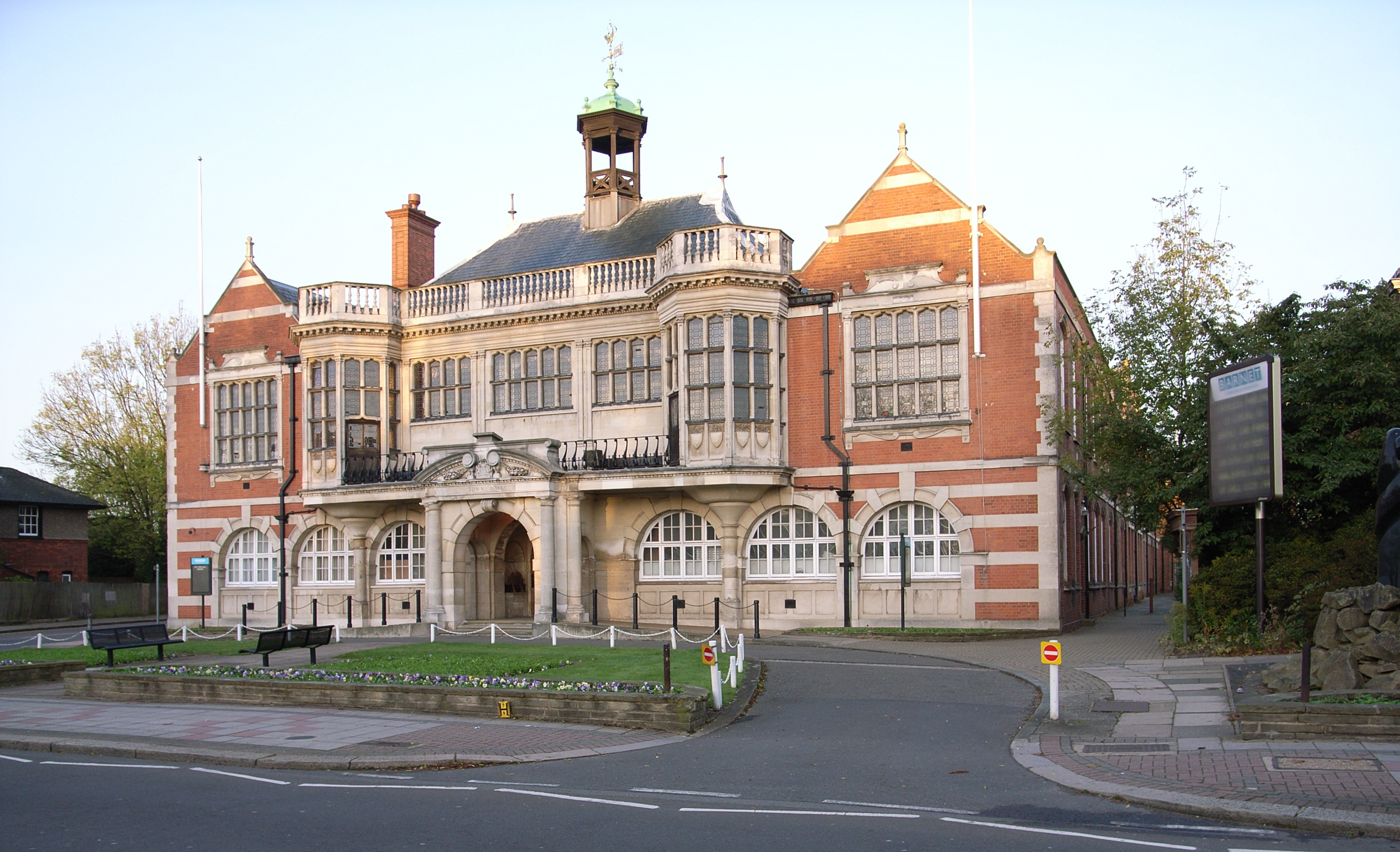
- Hendon Town Hall, The Burroughs, London, NW4 4BQ

Website
- www.barnet.gov.uk

Barnet London Borough Council, also known as Barnet Council, is the local authority for the London Borough of Barnet in Greater London, England. The council is responsible for providing certain services within the borough of Barnet. The council has been under no overall control since 2026, with Labour and the Conservatives having an equal number of councillors, and one Green councillor. The council meets at Hendon Town Hall and has its main offices at 2 Bristol Avenue in Colindale.

== History ==
There has been a Barnet local authority since 5 October 1863 when a local government district was created for the town of Barnet, also known as Chipping Barnet, governed by an elected local board. Such districts were reconstituted as urban districts under the Local Government Act 1894, which saw the board replaced by an urban district council.

The much larger London Borough of Barnet and its council were created under the London Government Act 1963, with the first election held in 1964. For its first year the council operated as a shadow authority alongside the area's five outgoing authorities, being the borough councils of Finchley and Hendon and the urban district councils of Barnet, East Barnet and Friern Barnet. The new council formally came into its powers on 1 April 1965, at which point the old districts and their councils were abolished. The minister responsible for the decision to merge the councils was Sir Keith Joseph.

The council's full legal name is "The Mayor and Burgesses of the London Borough of Barnet". The councils logo includes the copy "Barnet London Borough".

From 1965 until 1986 the council was a lower-tier authority, with upper-tier functions provided by the Greater London Council. The split of powers and functions meant that the Greater London Council was responsible for "wide area" services such as fire, ambulance, flood prevention, and refuse disposal; with the borough councils (including Barnet) responsible for "personal" services such as social care, libraries, cemeteries and refuse collection. As an outer London borough council Barnet has been a local education authority since 1965. The Greater London Council was abolished in 1986 and its functions passed to the London borough councils, with some services provided through joint committees.

Since 2000 the Greater London Authority has taken some responsibility for highways and planning control from the council, but within the English local government system the council remains a "most purpose" authority in terms of the available range of powers and functions.

Barnet Council created an ALMO, Barnet Homes, in 2004 to manage some housing services. The organisation was initially focused on managing the decent homes programme. Barnet Homes became part of The Barnet Group in 2012 and other council services were transferred to the organisation to manage.

In 2010, outline planning permission was provided for Brent Cross Town, which is part of one of the largest regeneration projects Barnet Council has ever managed. Barnet Council created a joint venture with Argent Related (now known as Related Argent) which is responsible for the redevelopment.

In 2012 Barnet outsourced the majority of its functions to Capita under what it called the 'One Barnet' programme, to be managed from locations outside of Barnet, including Northern Ireland, and the South West and North of England. The scheme was controversial; a local resident, Maria Stella Nash, tried to challenge the council's decision via a judicial review, without success and an application to appeal the decision was unsuccessful. Most of the outsourced functions were brought in-house during 2023, and some contracts ended in 2026.

Barnet was one of six local authorities in London that were given permission by the government to relax funding rules, in financial year 2025 to 2026, allowing them to raise an extra £55.7 million by borrowing or via the sale of assets. For financial year 2026 to 2027 they were allocated £79.3 million of exceptional financial support, due to a funding deficit.

== Powers and functions ==
The local authority derives its powers and functions from the London Government Act 1963 and subsequent legislation, and has the powers and functions of a London borough council. It sets council tax and as a billing authority it also collects precepts for the Greater London Authority functions and business rates.

Barnet sets planning policies which complement the Greater London Authority London Plan and national policies, and decides on almost all planning applications accordingly. It is a local education authority and is also responsible for social services, traffic and most roads, anti-social behaviour reviews, libraries, and environmental services including waste collection and disposal.

=== Social housing ===
The council's social housing, consisting of 13,000 homes, is managed by Barnet Homes, which is part of the Barnet Group, a local authority trading company. They were awarded the highest possible rating by the Regulator of Social Housing, in 2025. In April 2026, Barnet Council renewed an agreement with Barnet Homes, that contracts the company to manage their social housing for another 10 years. In September 2026, they were criticised for appointing Laura Johnson, the previous Housing Director for the Royal Borough of Kensington and Chelsea when the Grenfell Tower tragedy occurred. The Grenfell inquiry found that her decisions reduced fire safety. Barnet Homes responded by saying she was the most suitable candidate for the role, but confirmed in October 2026, that she was no longer employed by their organisation.

== Political control ==
The council went under no overall control at the 2026 election, after which a Labour minority administration formed to run the council.

The first election was held in 1964, initially operating as a shadow authority alongside the outgoing authorities until it came into its powers on 1 April 1965. Political control of the council since 1965 has been as follows:

Party in control	Years
Conservative	1965–1994
No overall control	1994–2002
Conservative	2002–2022
Labour	2022–2026
No overall control	2026–present

=== Leadership ===
Political leadership is provided by the leader of the council. The role of mayor is largely ceremonial in Barnet. The leaders since 1969 have been:

Councillor	Party	From	To
Alan Fletcher	Conservative	1969	1973
Andrew Pares	Conservative	1973	1975
Leslie Pym	Conservative	1975	1991
Roy Schutz	Conservative	1991	1994
Alan Williams	Labour	1994	2002
Victor Lyon	Conservative	May 2002	May 2005
Brian Salinger	Conservative	17 May 2005	May 2006
Mike Freer	Conservative	16 May 2006	15 Dec 2009
Lynne Hillan	Conservative	15 Dec 2009	17 May 2011
Richard Cornelius	Conservative	15 Jun 2011	9 May 2019
Dan Thomas	Conservative	21 May 2019	May 2022
Barry Rawlings	Labour	24 May 2022	

== Elections ==
Since the last boundary changes in 2022 the council has comprised 63 councillors representing 24 wards, with each ward electing two or three councillors. Seats are filled using plurality block voting; elections are held every four years.

Following the 2026 election, when Labour lost 10 seats to the Conservatives, the composition of the council is:

Party	Councillors
Labour	31
Conservative	31
Green	1
Total	63

The next election is due in May 2030.

== Wards ==
The wards of Barnet and the number of seats:

1. Barnet Vale (3 seats)
2. Brunswick Park (3)
3. Burnt Oak (3)
4. Childs Hill (3)
5. Colindale North (2)
6. Colindale South (3)
7. Cricklewood (2)
8. East Barnet (3)
9. East Finchley (3)
10. Edgware (3)
11. Edgwarebury (2)
12. Finchley Church End (3)
13. Friern Barnet (3)
14. Garden Suburb (2)
15. Golders Green (2)
16. Hendon (3)
17. High Barnet (2)
18. Mill Hill (3)
19. Totteridge and Woodside (3)
20. Underhill (2)
21. West Finchley (3)
22. West Hendon (3)
23. Whetstone (2)
24. Woodhouse (2)

== Premises ==
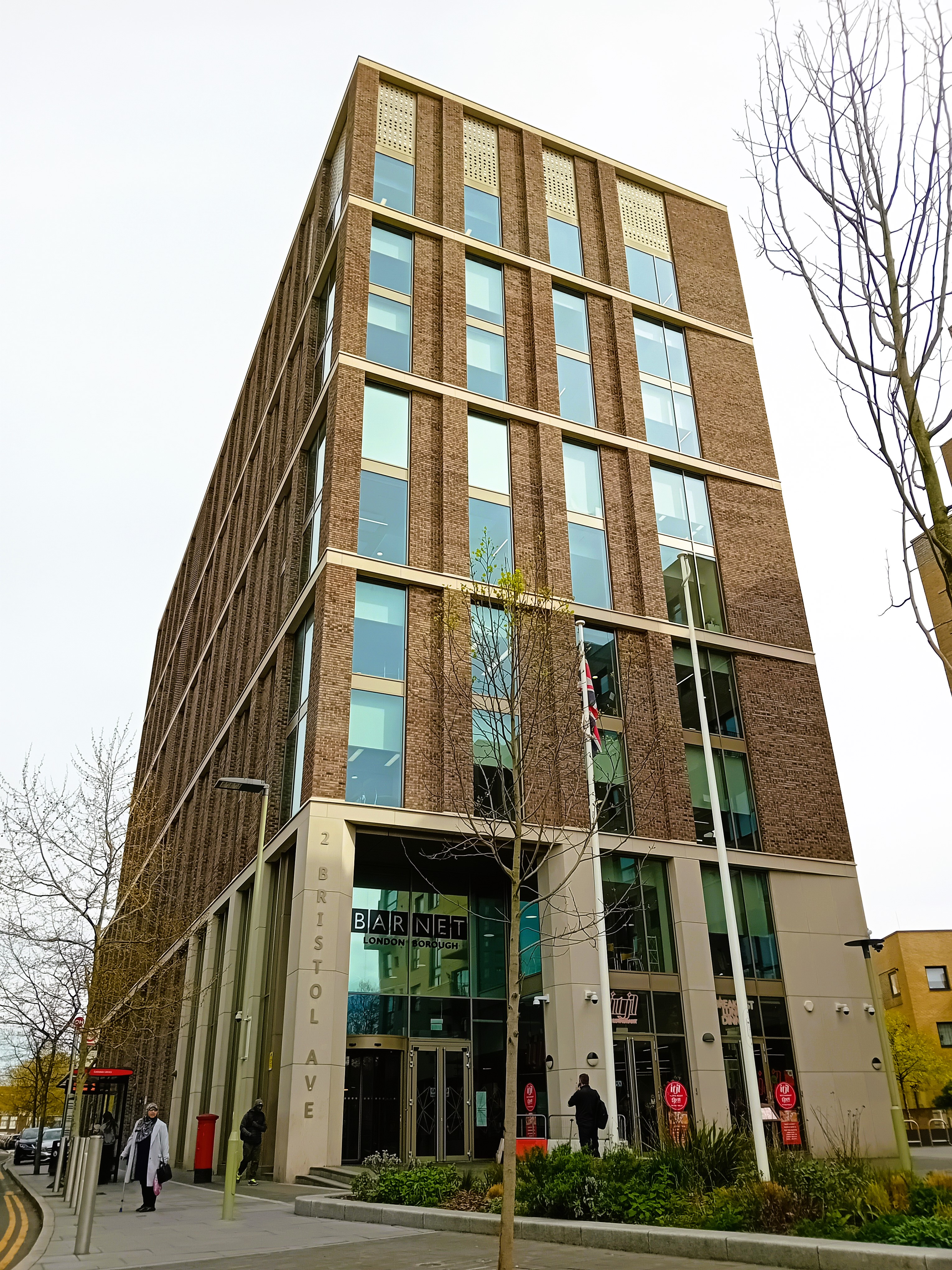
2 Bristol Avenue, Colindale: Council's main offices since 2019

The council has its main offices at 2 Bristol Avenue in Colindale, which was completed in 2019. Council meetings are held at Hendon Town Hall, which was completed in 1901 for Hendon Urban District Council. The town hall in Wood Street, previously used by Barnet Urban District Council, was subsequently used by Barnet Council as its register office, before becoming the premises of the North London Coroner's Court.

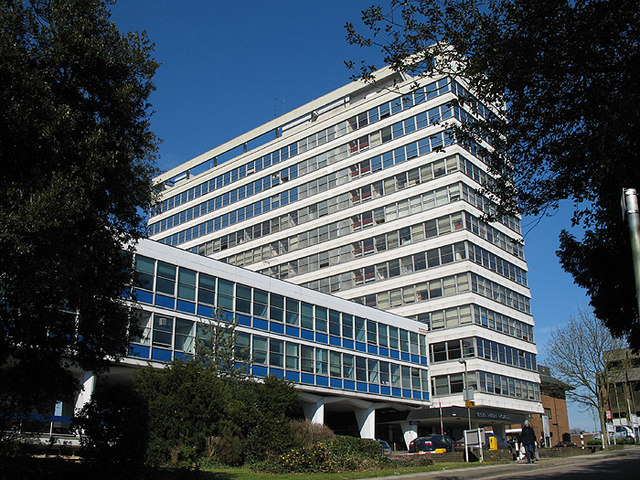
Barnet House, 1255 High Road, Whetstone: Council's main offices 1986–2019

Prior to 2019 the council's main offices were at Barnet House in Whetstone, which had been built in 1966 as 'Ever Ready House', being the headquarters of the British Ever Ready Electrical Company. The council moved into the building in 1986 and renamed it Barnet House.

== See also ==
- North West London Credit Union
