= 2 Bristol Avenue =

Municipal building in Colindale, London, England

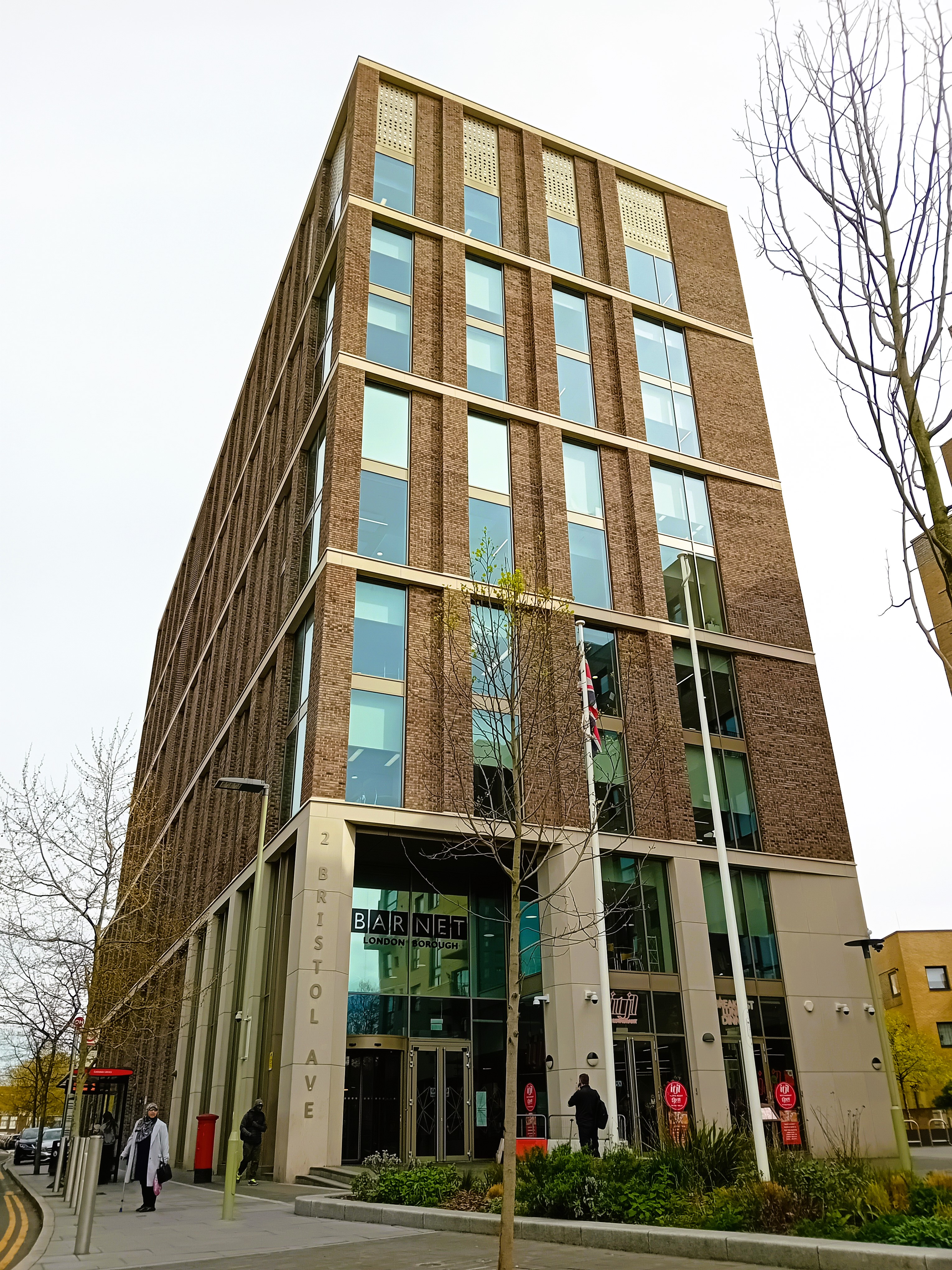
- The building in 2024

- Shown in Greater London
- 51.5976°N 0.2450°W
- Location: 2 Bristol Avenue, Colindale, London, NW9 4EU, England

History
- Built: 2019

Site notes
- Architect: Hawkins\Brown
- Architectural style: Modern style

2 Bristol Avenue is a municipal building in Bristol Avenue, Colindale, London. It is the administrative headquarters of Barnet London Borough Council.

== History ==
The building was commissioned to replace Barnet House in Whetstone as the administrative headquarters of Barnet London Borough Council. Civic leaders had deemed the building in Whetstone as uneconomic to operate as they sought to save circa £1 million a year in accommodation costs. The site that they selected for the new building had previously been part of Hendon Aerodrome, until it was closed in 1968, and was designated by the council as a regeneration area.

Construction work on the new nine-storey building commenced in December 2016. It was designed by Hawkins\Brown in the modern style, built by Galliford Try in concrete, brick and glass at a cost of £36 million and was completed in September 2019.

The scheme used post-tensioned concrete slabs, which were externally visible, on each of the floors. Internally, the principal spaces were the offices for 1,400 council staff, a recreation terrace on the 4th floor where staff could congregate and a cafe.

A new public area, to be known as Patterson Square, was established in front of the building on the corner of Bristol Avenue and Grahame Park Way. The public area, which involved provision of public seating, landscaping and a flagpole, was named after Gabrielle Patterson, who was the UK's first woman flying instructor. The choice of name was also intended to recall the connection with Hendon Aerodrome. Patterson instructed trainees on various aircraft included the de Havilland Mosquito and the Vickers Wellington during the Second World War.
