= Barnet House, London =

Barnet House
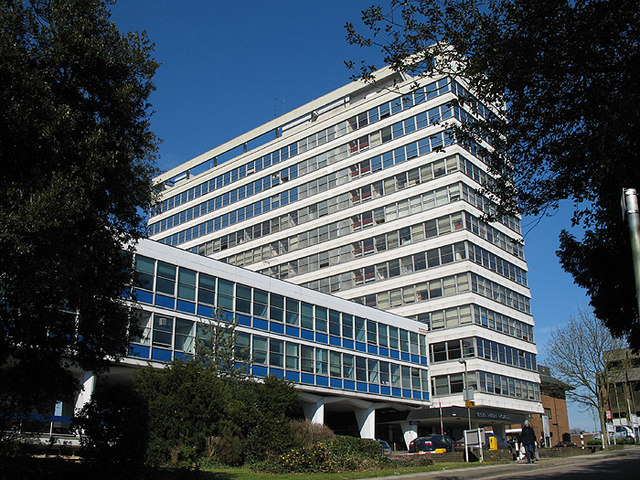
- Interactive map of the Barnet House area

General information
- Architectural style: Modern style
- Coordinates: 51.629429°N 0.175116°W
- Completed: 1966

Technical details
- Floor count: 12

Design and construction
- Architect: Richard Seifert

Barnet House is a twelve-storey office block at 1255 High Road, on the corner of Baxendale, at Whetstone, London, N20.

== History ==
The building was commissioned as Ever Ready House, to serve as the headquarters of the British Ever Ready Electrical Company. The site the directors selected had previously been occupied by a private villa known as "Woodside", which had been built for Joseph Baxendale in 1841, and which had served as a care home from 1889.

The new building was designed by Richard Seifert in the modern style and was completed in 1966. The design involved a twelve storey-tower facing onto High Road, with a three-storey structure behind. The tower was faced with alternating bands of concrete and metal-framed windows. In 1986 it became the main offices of Barnet London Borough Council, which renamed it Barnet House. After finding the building in Whetstone uneconomic to operate, the council relocated to a new building at 2 Bristol Avenue in Colindale in 2019.

In March 2017, it was announced that the building in Whetstone would be converted into 254 flats, some as small as 16 square metres (170 sq ft). The size of the smallest flats in the building was criticised by local councillors with one saying "These rabbit hutch homes would turn Barnet House into a human filing cabinet".

In December 2017 it was reported that the planning application to convert the building to residential accommodation had been rejected by the London Mayor, Sadiq Khan, on the grounds that the application included too few affordable homes.
