= Green Man, Whetstone =

Former pub in Whetstone, London

Coordinates: 51.6315°N 0.175°W

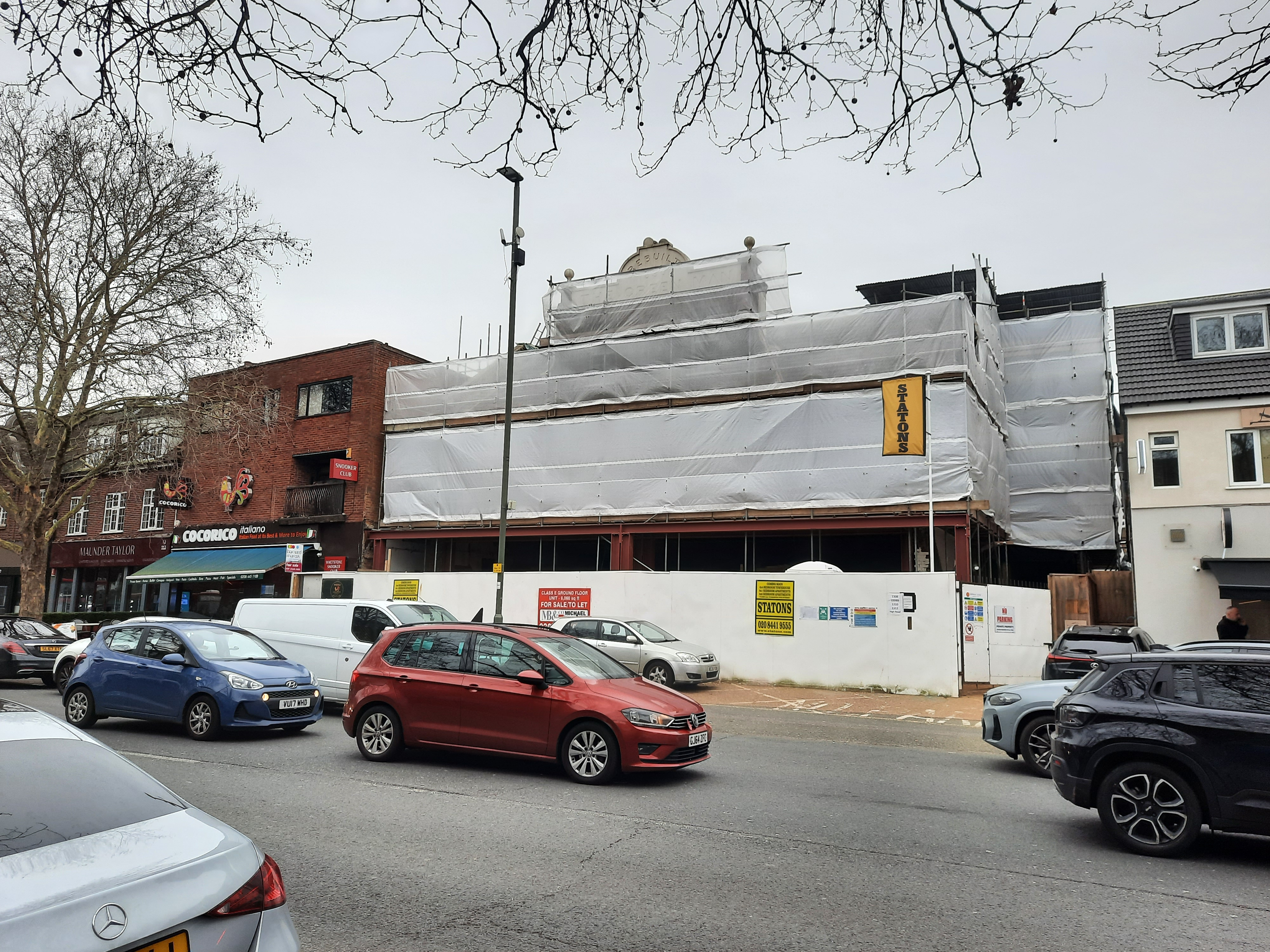
The site of the Green Man in Wheststone, as it appears today.

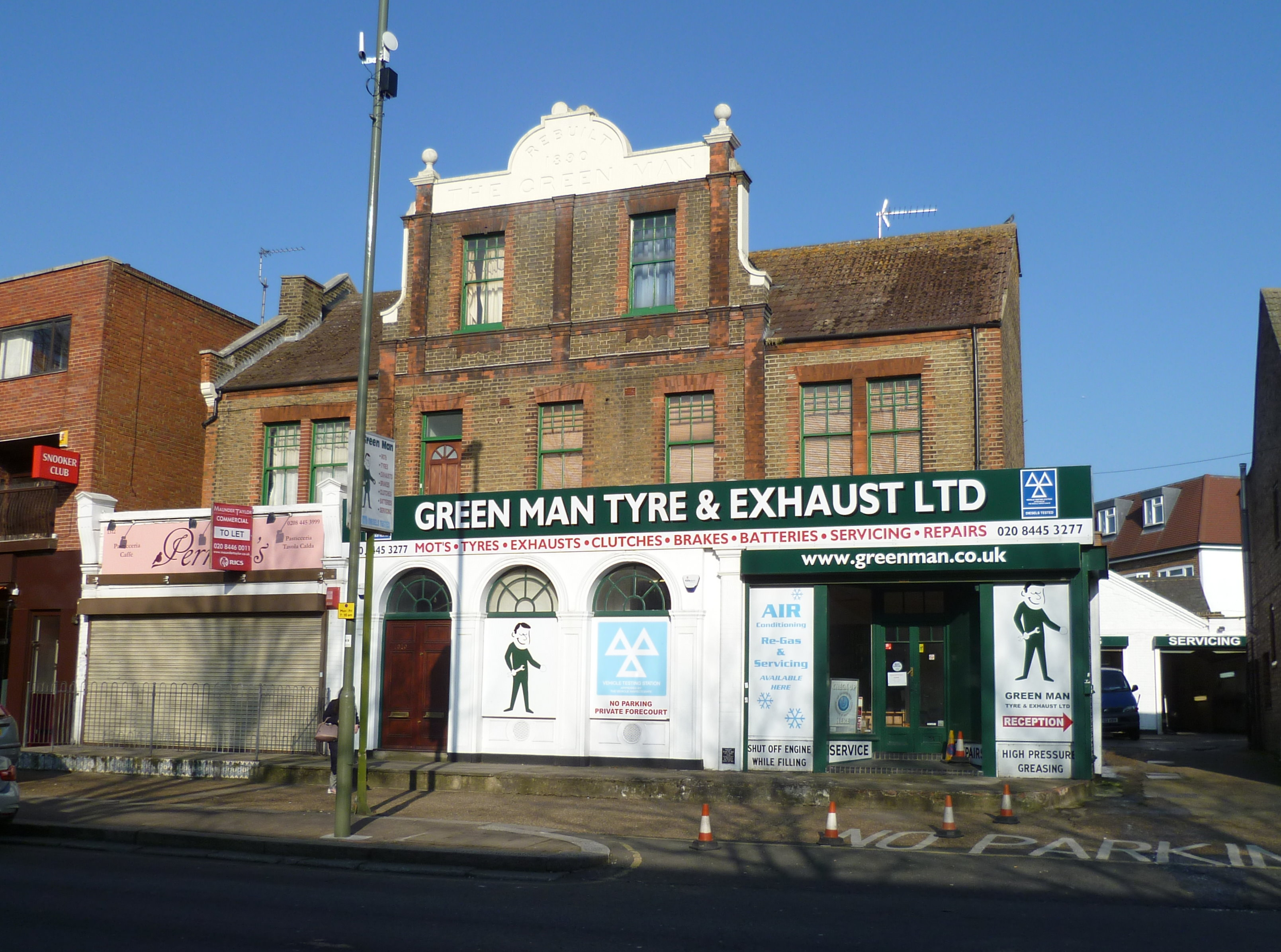
The Green Man, Whetstone, operating as a garage in 2015

The Green Man was a public house at 1308 High Road, Whetstone, north London, that dated from the 15th century and subsequently redeveloped several times. It closed in the late 20th century and was for many years a motor repair business.

== History ==
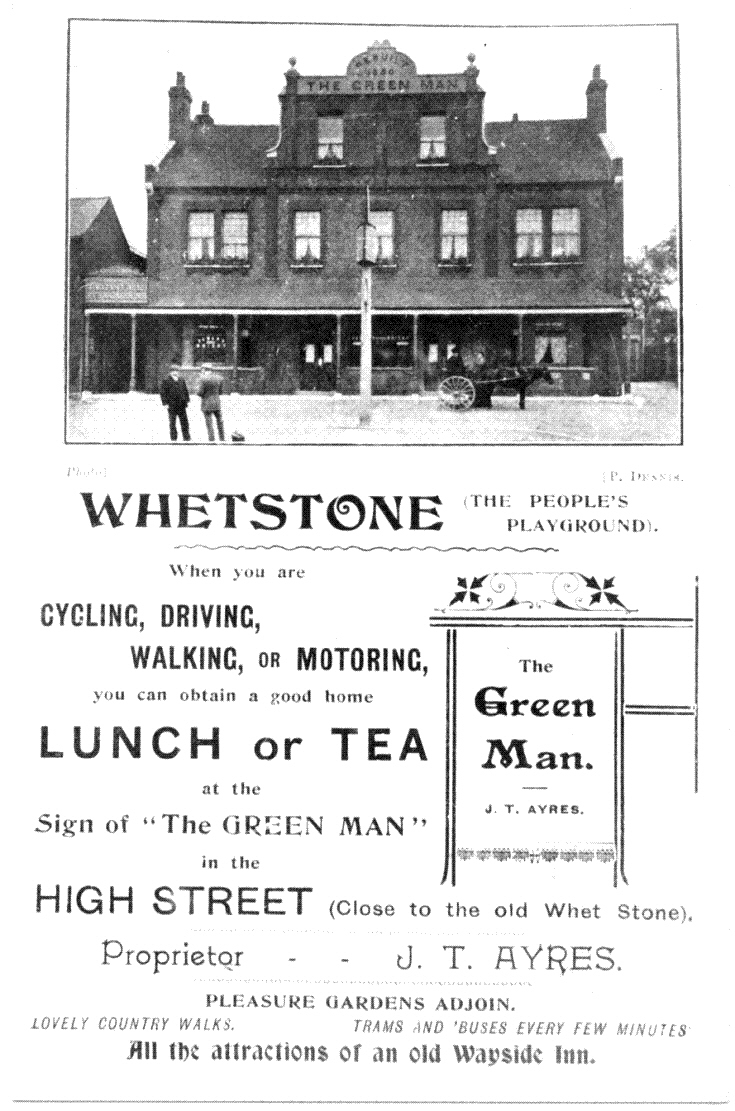
Advertisement for The Green Man, c. 1900

An inn belonged to the Heybourne family is thought to have existed on the site as early as 1400. It was known as The Lion when it was sold by John Doggett to Thomas Copewood in 1485. It may later have been known as The Red Lion. It subsequently became The Green Man.

The pub was located on the High Road, originally part of the Great North Road, the principal route north out of London to Scotland since medieval times, and popular with drovers. At one time it had a large pond and eight acres of grazing at the rear. The pub was closed by 1980 and was for many years a motor repair business, which shut down in 2025. Planning permission was granted in 2024 for the site to be redeveloped into a combination of flats, houses and commercial units.

== The building ==
The pub was rebuilt in 1740 and refronted in 1830. The current building, which at the front is the pub's former stables, dates from 1890 when it was again rebuilt.
