= Oriental City =

Yaohan Plaza / Oriental City

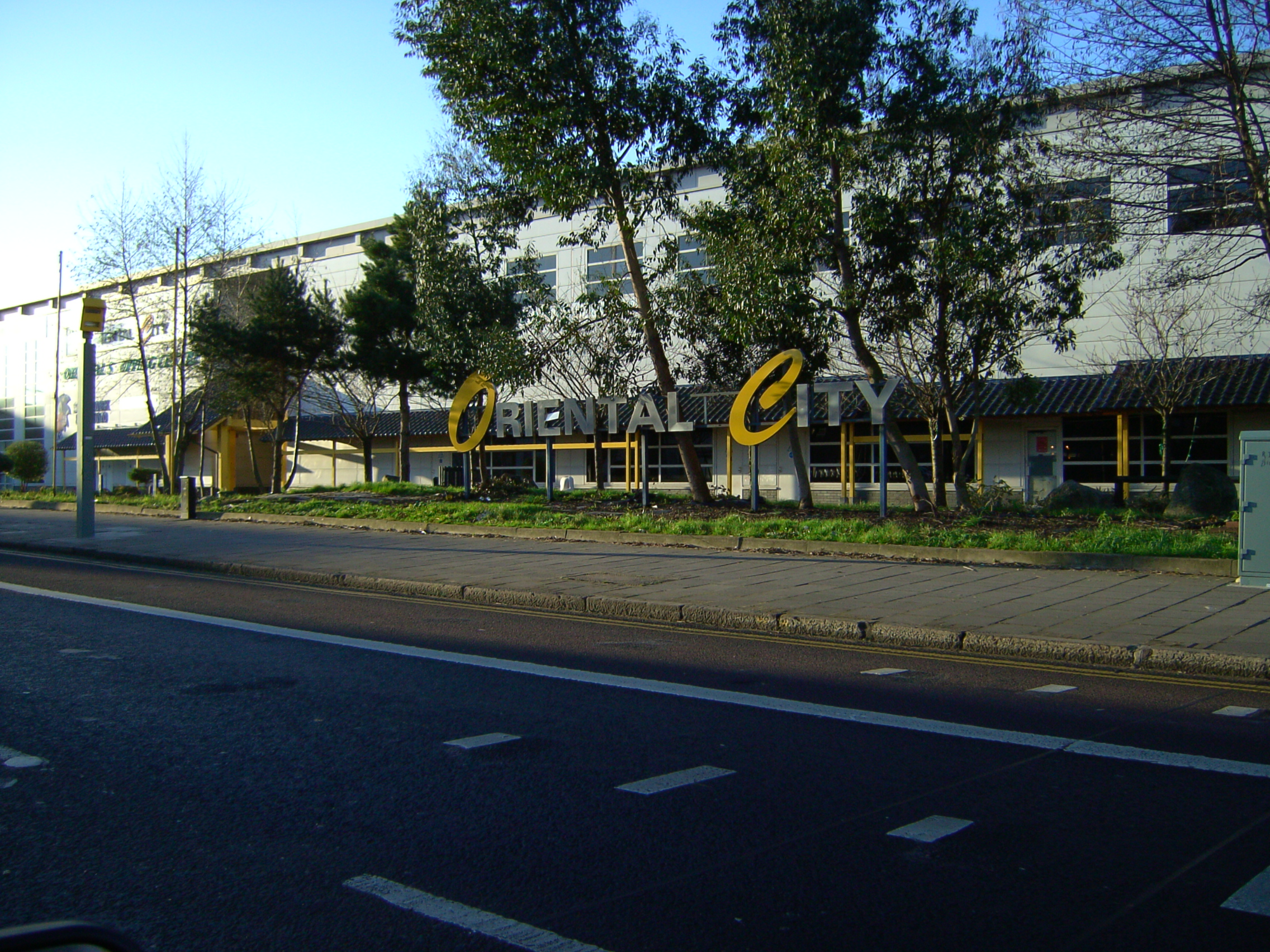
- From Edgware Road
- Location: Colindale, London Borough of Brent, England
- Coordinates: 51°35′36″N 0°15′37″W
- Opened: August 1993; 33 years ago
- Closed: June 2008; 18 years ago
- Owner: Yaohan Co., Ltd (1993-1997)
- Num. of stores: 73
- Num. of anchor tenants: 1
- Floor area: 141,000 sq ft (13,100 m^{2})
- Floors: 2
- Parking: 800 spaces

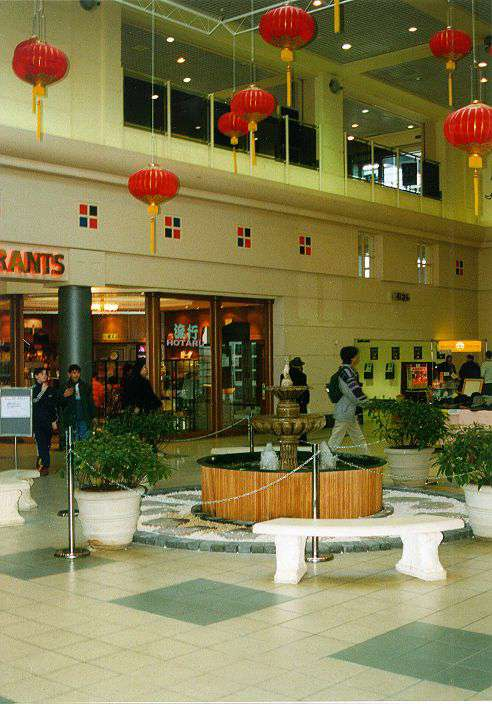
The main hall about 1997. Banners proclaiming "All Japan under one roof" had been replaced by red lanterns.

Oriental City was a shopping centre at 399 Edgware Road in Colindale, North London, England. Yaohan Plaza played a short but significant role in promoting Japanese cuisine and culture in London. Later, as Oriental City, it was referred to as London's "real Chinatown".

Yaohan opened it in 1993, as a luxury Japanese shopping centre. After Yaohan's bankruptcy in 1997, it became a lower-end mall offering foods, other goods and services to the East Asian community.

The complex closed in 2008 and was demolished in 2014 to make way for a Morrisons supermarket. In 2017, the smaller Bang Bang Oriental Food Hall opened on part of the site.

== History ==
=== Yaohan Plaza ===
During the rapid growth of the Japanese economy in the 1980s, many Japanese businesses established in the United Kingdom. Honda formed a partnership with British Leyland in 1979 and Nissan opened its first European factory in Sunderland in 1986. Such activities caused a significant increase in Japanese living in the UK.

Yaohan, the Japanese department store, opened in London in 1993. At the time, an estimated over 40,000 Japanese lived in the vicinity, and there was growing local interest in Japanese cuisine and culture. It would serve that large Japanese community and introduce Europeans to Japanese food and Japanese culture. Yaohan had already established operations in Hong Kong, Singapore and the United States.

Yaohan invested £50 million (£87 million in 2021) in its Colindale store with 10,134 square metres (109,080 sq ft) of retail space, office areas and parking for 800 cars. The building incorporated Japanese architectural elements such as a tile roof. Internally, shops presented traditional Japanese facades similar to the Edo-Koji shopping area at Tokyo International Airport. Yaohan Plaza, London opened as a high-end Japanese shopping centre on 28 August 1993 with the slogan: "All Japan under one roof." Chindon'ya musicians performed at the opening.

Yaohan Plaza featured a grand entrance hall with wooden frame supporting a ceremonial banner and knot, below a traditional tile roof. The single-storey north wing housed a Japanese supermarket and food court. Other shops and restaurants were in two storeys to the south and there was a multi-storey car park. Yaohan had 15 directly owned retail operations, 47 third-party stores and eleven restaurants. The supermarket sold Japanese foods, including dry goods, sushi and bento boxes, fresh fish, and Japanese-style meats to suit yakiniku and shabu shabu. Fresh fruit was flown in from Japan, and a Japanese-style bakery operated on site. The supermarket offered over 70 varieties of sake and 40 varieties of miso. Prices were considered high relative to Japan due to import costs, but 10-20 per cent lower than smaller Japanese shops in central London. The New York Times reported in 1993 that a 1.5 litre bottle of cold Japanese tea cost £4.99 (£8.69 in 2021). Yaohan's sushi kitchen operated 24 hours a day and supplied Waitrose, Selfridges, and Harvey Nichols.

There was a full-service sushi bar, izakaya, okonomiyaki restaurant, ramen bar and a café, as well as a food court offering bento boxes, kushiyaki, donburi such as unatamadon noodles, and other Japanese foods. A wagashi-ya operated and Minamoto Kitchoan used Yaohan Plaza to establish a London presence. Expatriates from Mino operated 'Utsuwa no Yakata', which sold Japanese porcelain and tablewares. The main hall hosted fairs for products such as imported antiques as well as car promotions and cultural displays such as kimono.

The SegaDome arcade was a miniature SegaWorld and a large graphic of Sega's mascot Sonic the Hedgehog adorned the outside of the building.

Other Japanese shops included a bookshop, Asahiya Shoten, with a large selection of manga, a video rental shop, an imported toy shop that also sold computer and video games, a Sanrio boutique and an electronics retailer. Services included a hairdresser specialising in Asian hair, travel agency, estate agent, cram school and dental practice. British and European luxury goods were offered to Japanese tourists by Liberty of London. Yaohan Plaza claimed that 70% of customers were Japanese. It arranged with a local taxi service to provide Japanese-language service and female drivers.

Yaohan Plaza employed 190 staff, and each was expected to participate in morning rituals typical of a Japanese company, including singing the company song.

The opening of Yaohan Plaza attracted media attention. Monique Roffey in The Independent described it as a "hypermarket cum shopping mall cum cultural space-capsule".

By 1995, Yaohan encountered problems. A report suggested younger Japanese, a growing demographic in Britain's Japanese community, were less interested in the Japanese shopping experience. They had reduced spending power during a time of recession and were unwilling to pay a premium for imported goods. Customers complained about food going on sale past its sell-by date. Yaohan renamed their shopping centre Oriental City and sought to attract the Chinese, Korean, Vietnamese, Thai and Malaysian communities in the United Kingdom. Several Japanese outlets were replaced and British Chinese became the largest group of customers.

Yaohan's expansion across Asia left it vulnerable to the 1997 Asian financial crisis, and the business filed for bankruptcy that year. The London shopping centre was sold in October 1997 to Malaysian owners.

=== Oriental City ===
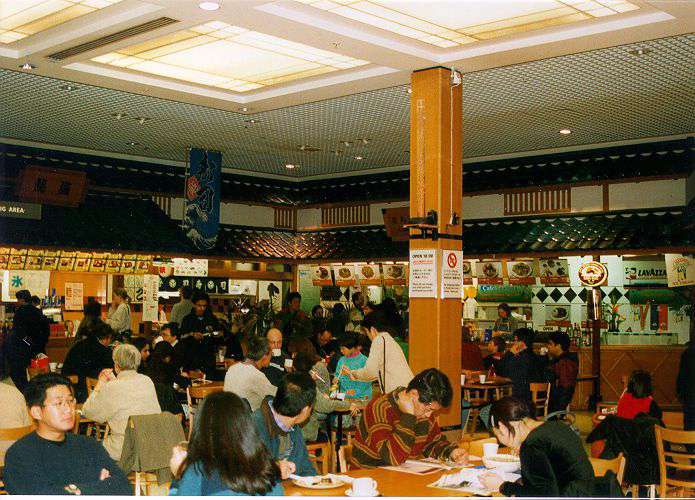
The Oriental City food court

The oriental supermarket and food court remained, but the food court stalls now offered Malaysian, Thai, Vietnamese, Chinese and Korean foods, as well as Japanese foods.

Some of the more expensive to maintain Japanese architectural elements had been removed or neglected; the grand entrance decor was reduced to a pair of Chinese guardian lions. The Japanese garden was no longer maintained and fell into disrepair. Elements of the exterior natural wood tone were painted yellow. However, most stalls in the food court maintained a distinctly Japanese facade despite serving other cuisines.

The upper floor contained two dim sum restaurants, a Sichuan restaurant, and an 'all you can eat' restaurant. Outside, there were stalls for durian and satay.

There was a high turnover of non-food shops. Of the original tenants, only Utsuwa-No-Yataka remained, the majority having moved on by 2003. By 2006, retail outlets included a tailor, jeweller, hairdresser, beauty shop, Chinese medicine shops, a martial arts school and store, furniture store, and the Sega Park arcade. The complex included a casino. Original okonomiyaki restaurant, Abeno, went on to earn a Michelin star after relocating to central London.

Oriental City became a focal point for the Oriental community, hosting events which promoted the cultural identity of different East Asian and Southeast Asian countries. These typically consisted of performing arts, and promoting the country's cuisine.

In 2006, Oriental City received about 10,000 weekly visitors.

=== Closure and redevelopment ===
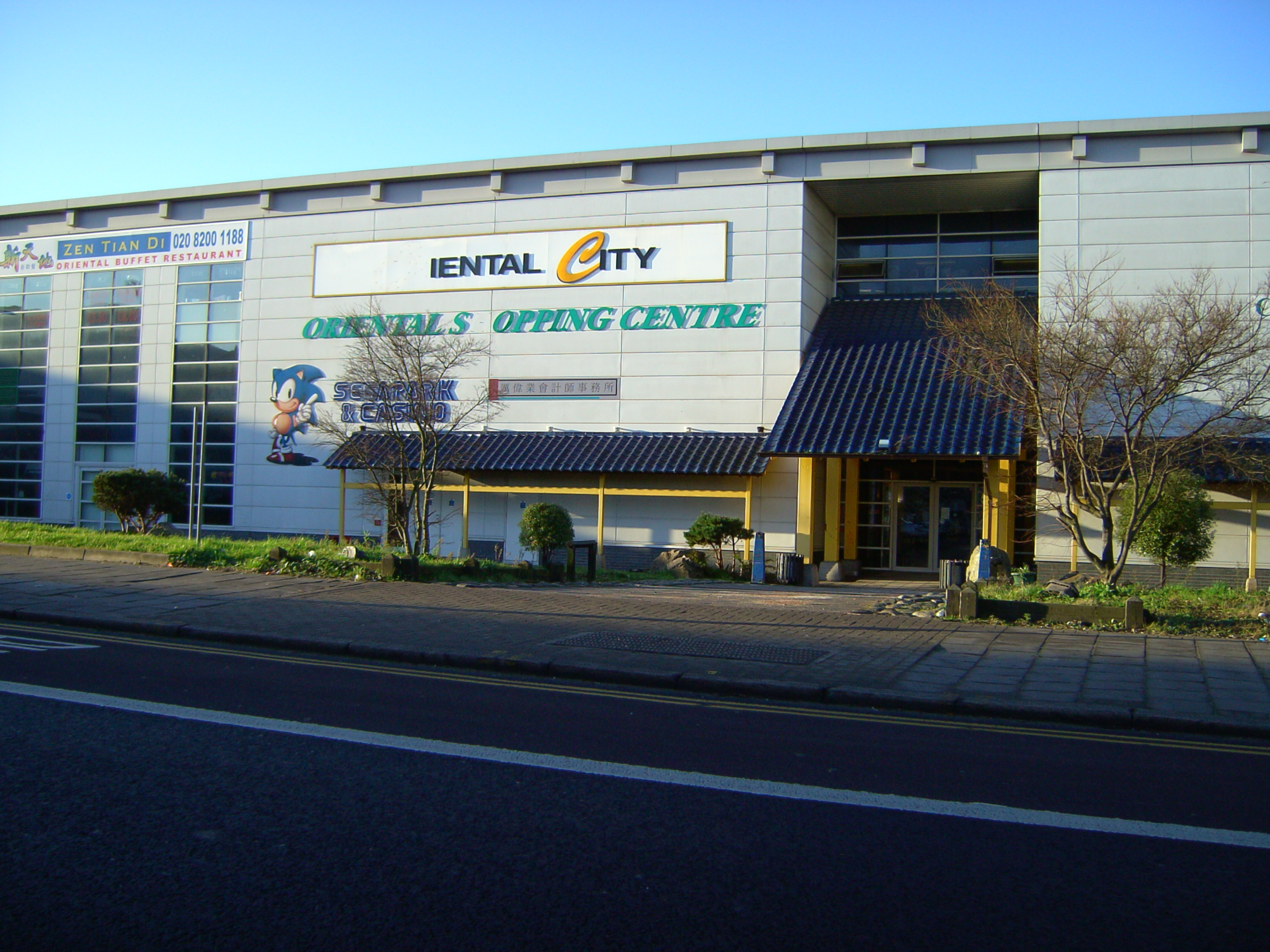
Secondary entrance to the south wing

In November 2006, Oriental City was bought by developer Development Securities who planned to demolish the centre and replace it with a B&Q, housing and a primary school. The developer stated that there would be provisions for the current tenants of Oriental City to continue in the new premises; however, the tenants objected. They argued the new complex would take up to nine years to complete, contrary to the developer's claimed three years. Tenants did not believe their businesses could survive the temporary relocation.

The East Asian community feared redevelopment would mean the loss of an important community focal point. The tenants shut their businesses for a day to protest at Brent Town Hall. They were backed by a long-time visitor to Oriental City, ex-Arsenal footballer and pundit Ian Wright, who met planning officials to object to the plans.

In February 2007, the Chinese Consul General wrote to the then-Mayor of London Ken Livingstone to express his "deep concern" about the project, calling for the proposal to be modified. Following a petition, it was announced that Oriental City would remain open until at least May 2008, rent free to the tenants. It closed its doors at 7:00 pm on Sunday 1 June 2008, with thousands of people flocking to Oriental City for the last time.

Development Securities attempted to sell their site to B&S Homes for £68 million. The purchasers paid a non refundable £16 million deposit but did not complete the purchase.

In early 2009, there was speculation that Oriental City would reopen. At the time, it was reported that discussions were taking place between the owners and former tenants, but in February 2010, the former tenants held a protest at the site over the continued closure. Morrisons was identified as interested in the site for a new supermarket.

In May 2013, planning permission was granted for a mixed-use development with Morrisons as an anchor tenant. Its store opened in March 2016. Brent Council reserved a remaining part of the site for "Far Eastern and Oriental uses". 30,000 square feet (2,800 m^{2}) of restaurant space became the Bang Bang Oriental Food Hall.

== In TV and film ==
The centre was used as an abandoned mall in the BBC One series Luther. It appeared in the 2012 film Dredd, where it was restored to a semblance of its former glory with a Blade Runner-like makeover. It was used in the first episode of the 2011 BBC Three series The Fades. Oriental City was the single location used for the 2012 TV film of a Royal Shakespeare Company production of Julius Caesar, directed by Gregory Doran. The complex appeared in 2013 during a first-season episode of the BBC Two series Charlie Brooker's Weekly Wipe, with Brooker wandering around various parts of the derelict car park, Zen Tian Di Chinese buffet and a set of escalators. The centre was used for the music video Bittersweet Memories by Welsh metalcore band Bullet for My Valentine.

== See also ==
- Japanese community of London
- Wing Yip
