= Colindale =

Area of Barnet in London, England

Coordinates: 51.5930°N 0.2479°W

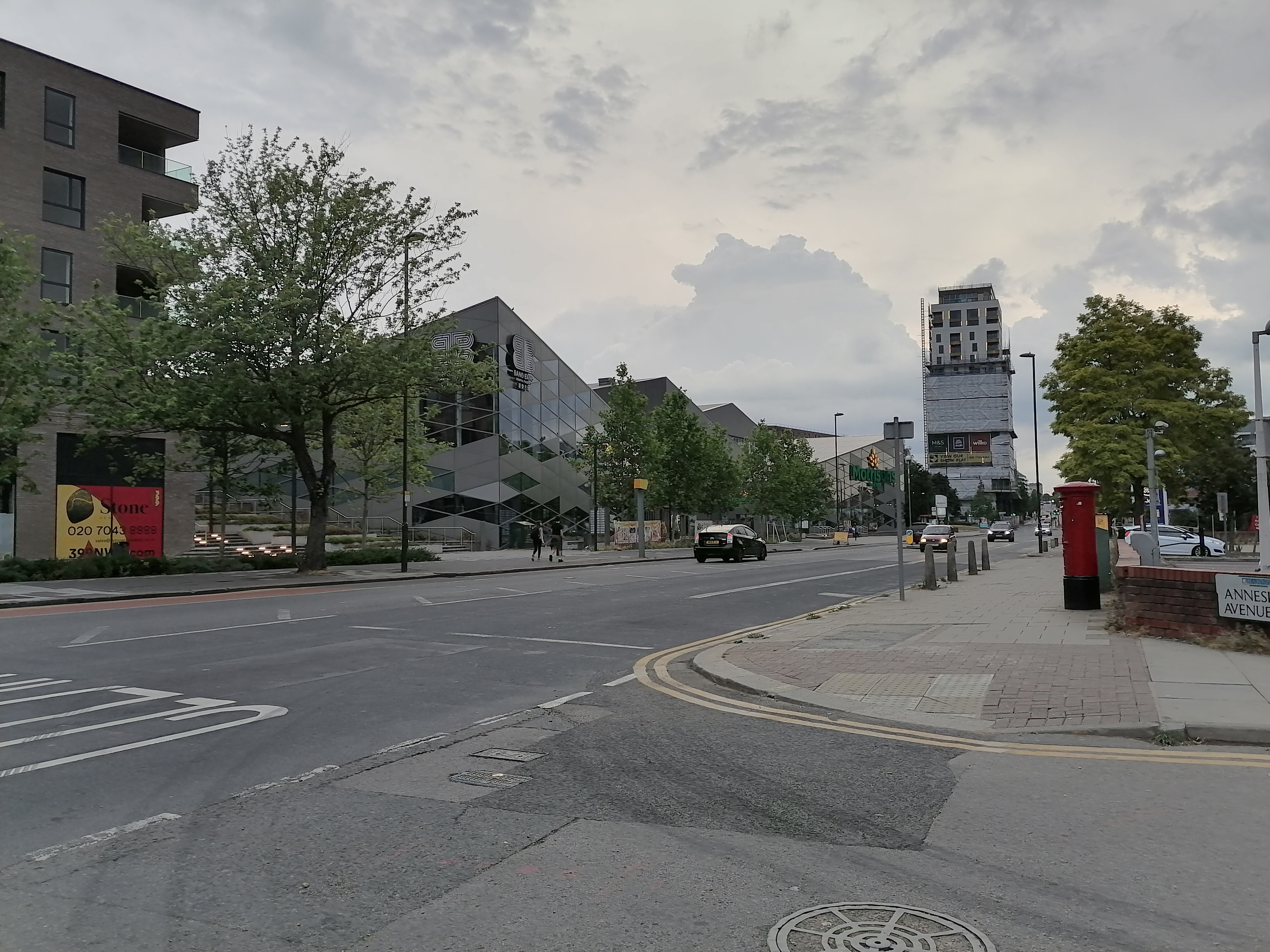
- A section of Edgware Road showing Bang Bang Oriental Food Hall and a Morrisons supermarket, formerly the site of Oriental City

- Location within Greater London
- Population: 17,098 (2011 Census. Ward)
- OS grid reference: TQ213897
- Ceremonial county: Greater London
- Region: London
- Country: England
- Sovereign state: United Kingdom
- Post town: LONDON
- Postcode district: NW9
- Post town: EDGWARE
- Postcode district: HA8
- Dialling code: 020
- Police: Metropolitan
- Fire: London
- Ambulance: London
- UK Parliament: Hendon

Colindale is a district in the London Borough of Barnet; its main shopping street on the A5 forming the borough boundary with neighbouring Brent. Colindale is a suburban area, and in recent years has had many new apartments built. It is also the location of the 1960s–1970s Grahame Park housing estate, built on former parts of Hendon Aerodrome. It is situated about eight miles (thirteen kilometres) northwest of Charing Cross, directly northwest of Hendon, to the south of Edgware and east of Queensbury.

== History ==
Formerly in the borough and ancient parish of Hendon, the area was essentially the dale between Mill Hill and The Burroughs. By the middle of the 20th century, it had come to include that part of the Edgware Road between The Hyde and Burnt Oak.

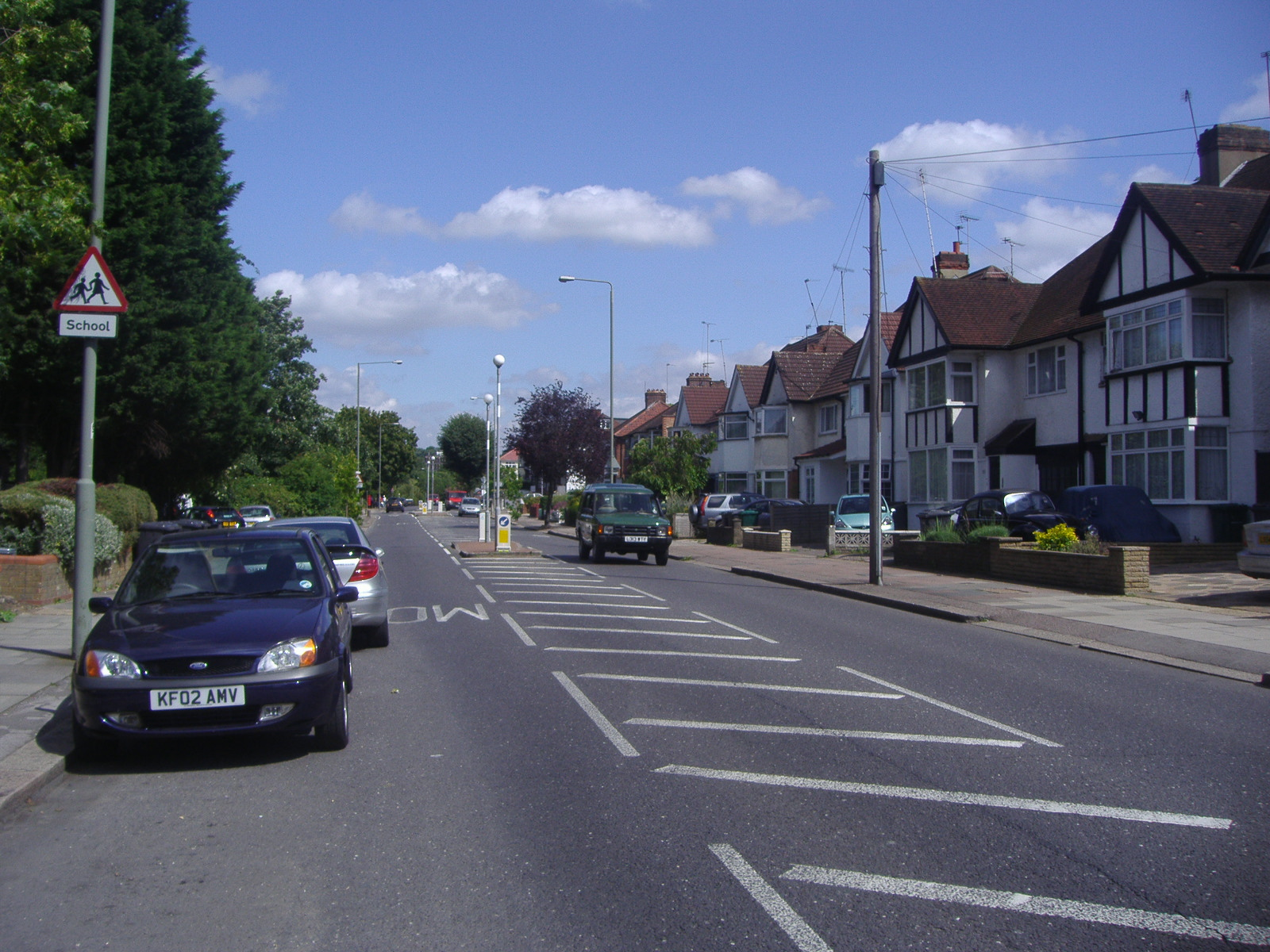
Colindeep Lane today

The area was originally called Collin Deep after the 16th-century family of John Collin. Until the 20th century, Colindale was without any buildings save for a large house called Colindale Lodge, Colindale Farm and a few cottages. A spelling with two Ls, 'Collindale', has been used. All of these properties were on Colindeep Lane which had in the medieval period been an alternative route out of London (via Hampstead, Golders Green and Hendon) to the Edgware Road. By the end of the 16th century it was not often used as a main road and by the middle part of the 19th century was called Ancient Street.

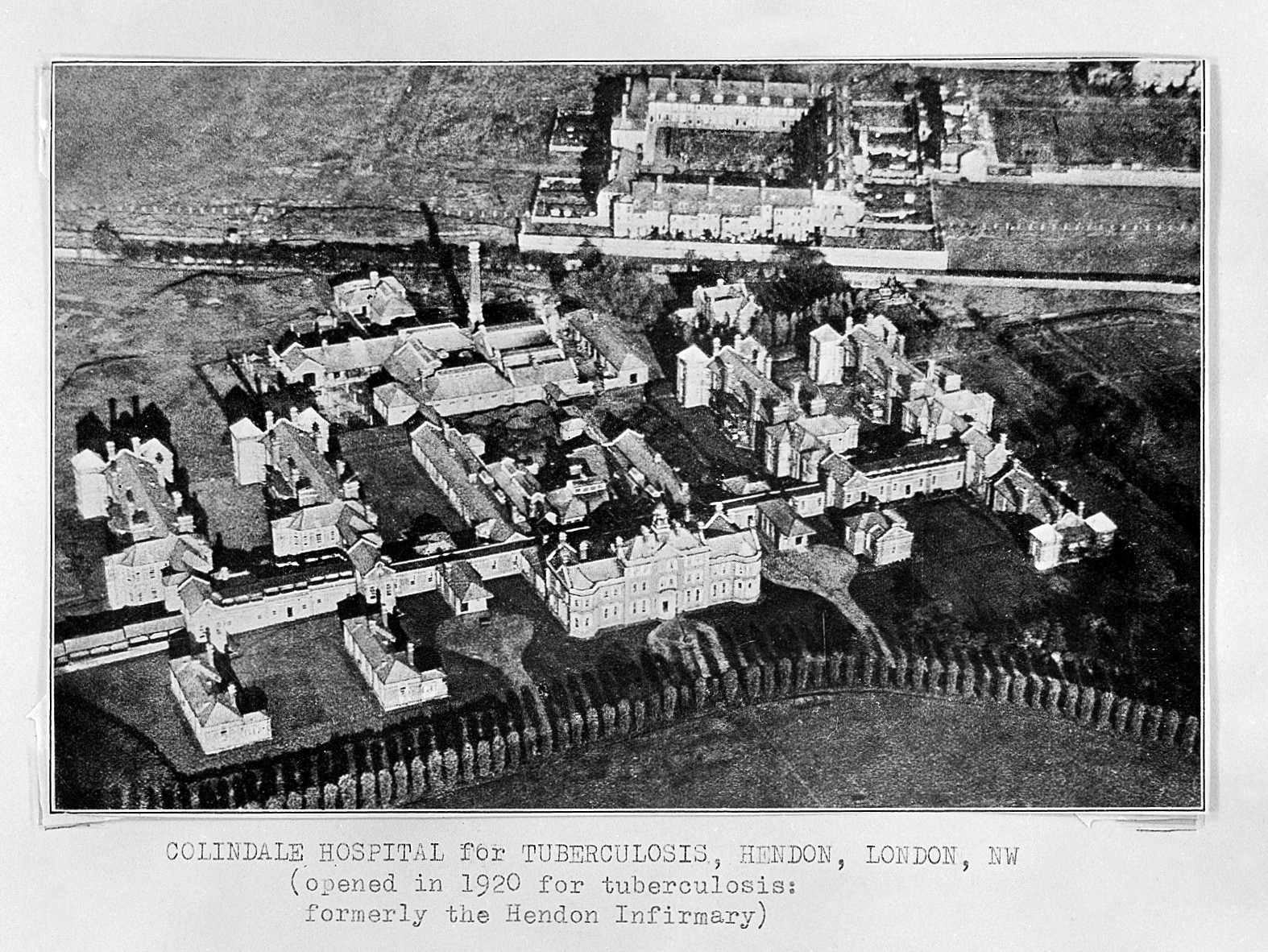
Hendon Infirmary, later Colindale Hospital for tuberculosis, c. 1930

By the end of the 19th century, cheap land prices made Colindale attractive to developers. Colindale Hospital was opened in 1898 as an asylum for the long-term sick of central London, and in 1907 The Government Lymph Establishment for making vaccines was built. By 1996 the majority of the hospital was closed, and by 2009 was mostly derelict. The site is now a housing development, consisting primarily of apartment blocks. Only the Grade II Listed administration buildings at the centre of the hospital site remain.

In 1902, the British Library built a new depository for newspapers and periodicals on Colindale Avenue. Initially, material was merely stored at Colindale and transported into central London for consultation. However, the newspaper library reading room moved to Colindale in 1934.

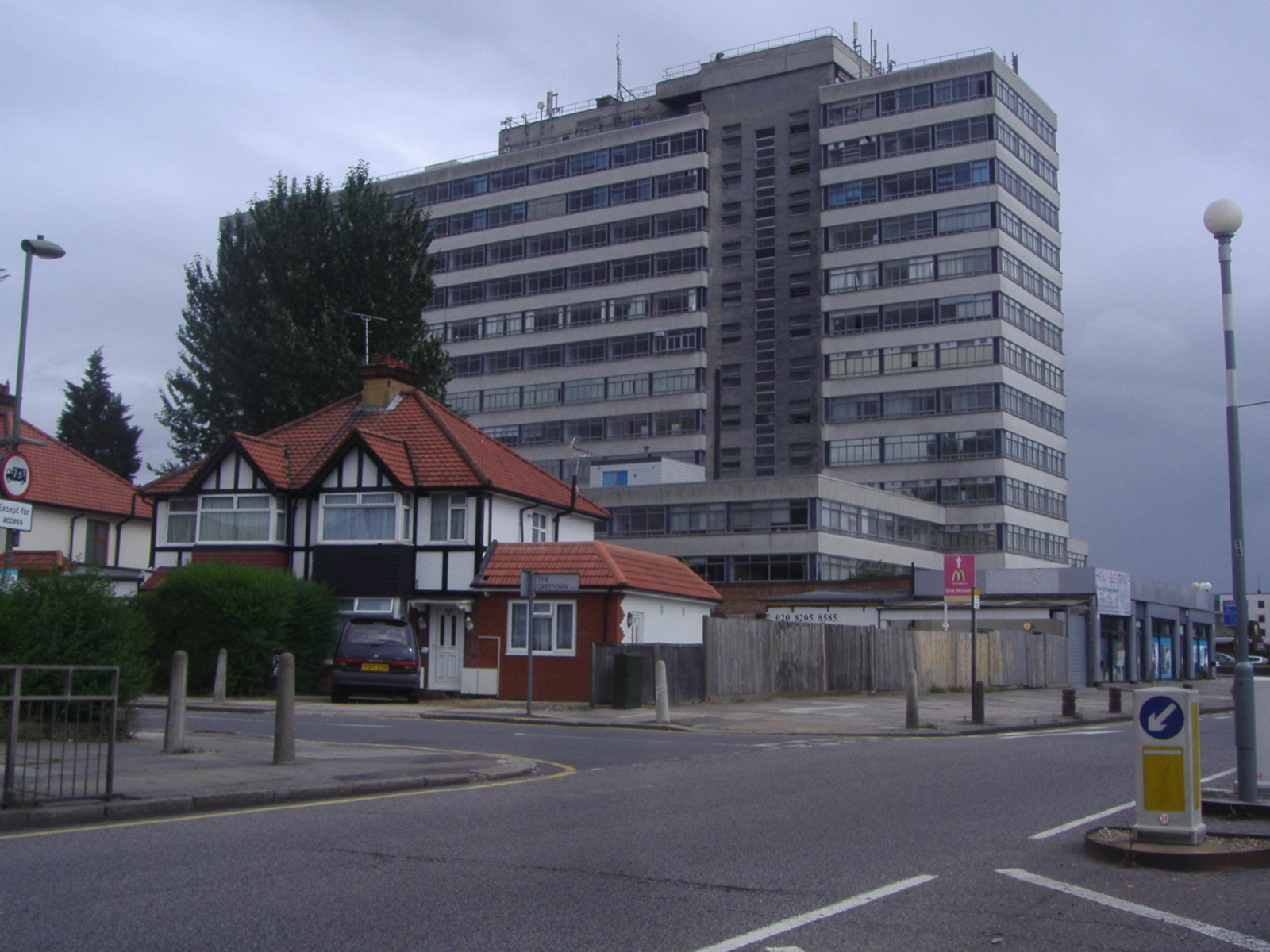
1960s built Merit House, on the former site of Hendon Tram Depot

Hendon Tram Depot (site now occupied by Merit House, opposite Oriental City) was in 1910 the scene of the first trials in Britain of a trolleybus. This location eventually became Colindale Trolleybus Depot, from which route 645 operated until January 1962, when the depot was closed down and eventually demolished. Land behind the depot was used from 1959 to 1962 by the George Cohen 600 Group for scrapping the vast majority of London's fleet of 1891 trolleybuses.

During the mid 1950s, Colindale was nicknamed "The Red Belt" because of the large number of leading communists who had lived there, including Billy Strachan, Harry Pollitt, Reg Birch, and Peter Kerrigan.

=== Manufacturing ===
Garston's Ltd established a trunk factory in 1901, as well as a row of cottages called Leatherville. As such it is the first manufacturer 'in the Colindale'. By 1914 there was already housing between Colindale Avenue and Annesley Avenue, mostly to house the workers of such endeavours.

During the First World War, Colindale became an important centre of aircraft production. The Airco factory was, at the time, the largest aircraft manufacturing company in the world.

Immediately after the First World War demand for aircraft declined, but a number of other manufacturing companies came to Colindale. General Motors took over some of the Airco buildings. Franco Illuminated Signs opened on Aerodrome Road in 1922, having made the lights for the Franco British Exhibition of 1908 (it was later abbreviated to 'Franco'). It was best known for the neon signs found in Piccadilly from the 1920s to the 1970s. Frigidaire started in a wooden shack in Aerodrome Road, employing 11 people in 1923, and selling the first automatic household fridges in England.

The reason why many of these and other companies chose Colindale was that there was land available for expansion. However, by 1923, when the tube railway reached Colindale, land prices had increased and factory expansion was not so easy, so some industries looked elsewhere for premises. In 1931, Frigidaire, for example, decided to build a new manufacturing plant to the west, on the A5 Edgware Road, and had moved its entire operations there by 1946.

=== Suburban expansion ===
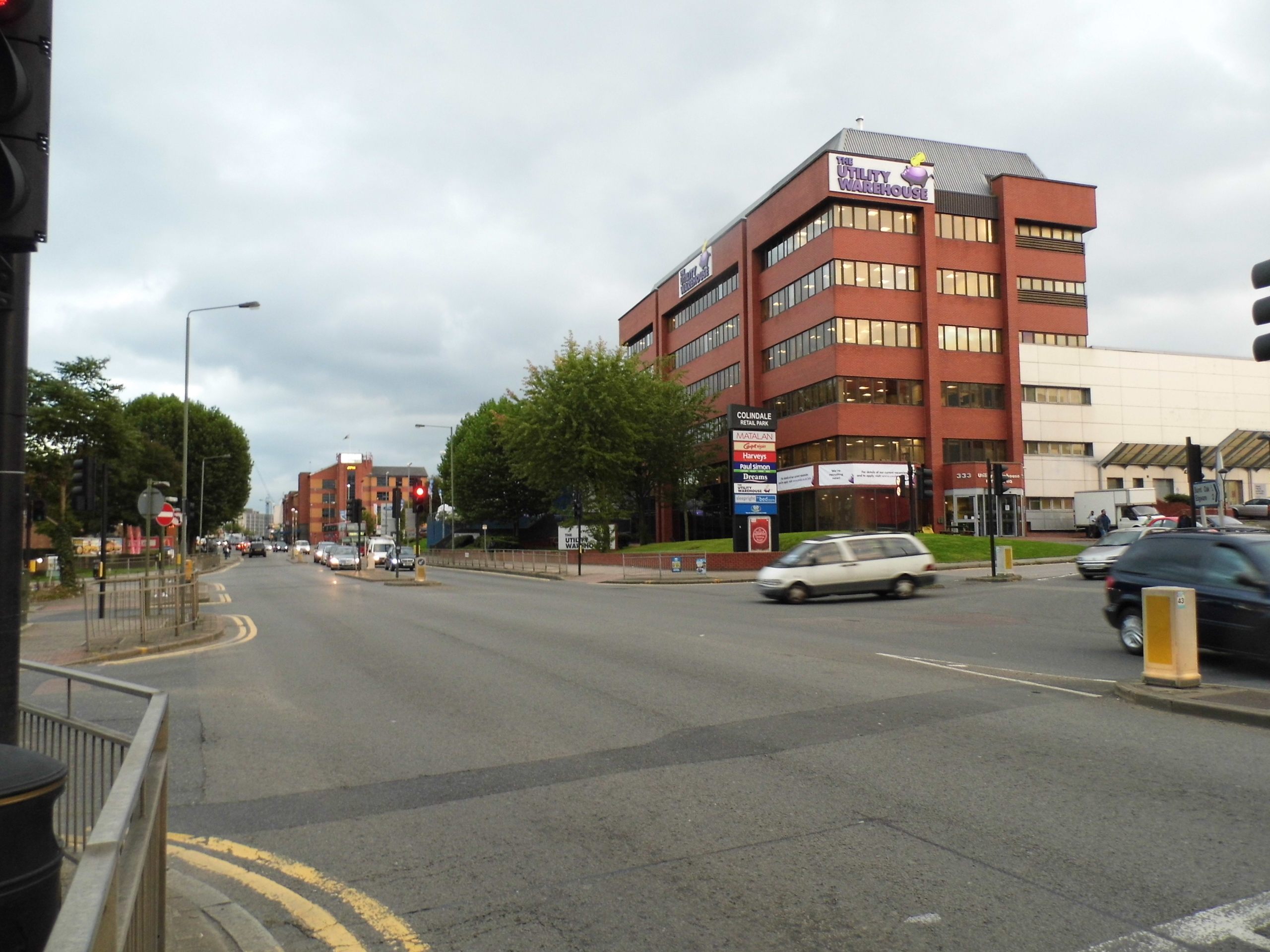
Edgware Road

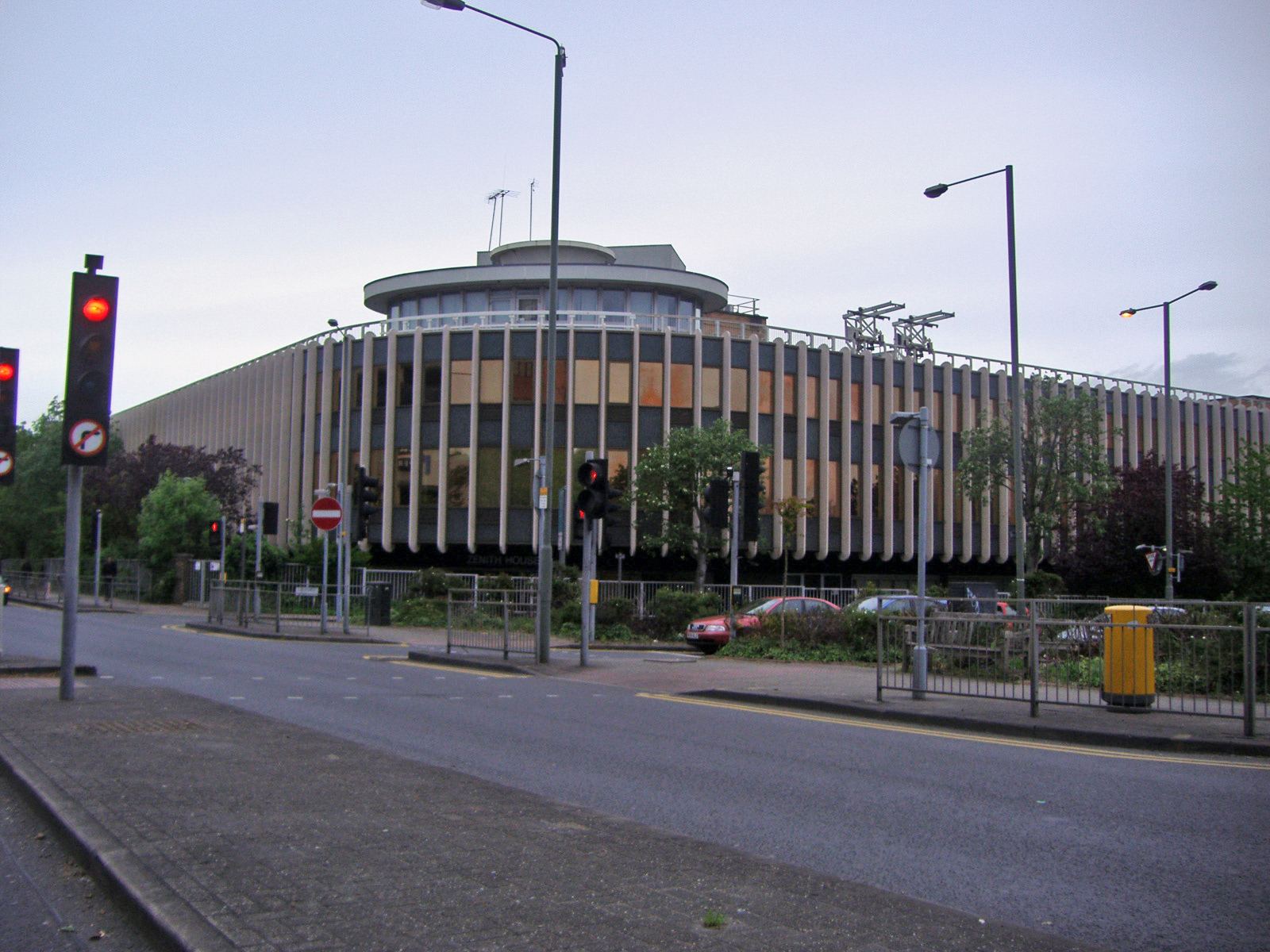
Zenith House, Edgware Road (demolished 2008)

After the tube station opened, development as a London suburb was rapid, and by 1939 much of the western side was semi-detached housing. Typical was the Colin Park Estate, built by F. H. Stucke & Co. around Colindeep Lane in 1927. Some of the houses on this estate are by the architect E. G. Trobridge.

St Matthias started as a mission church in 1905. Its permanent building was opened in 1934, and rebuilt between 1971 and 1973. Colindale Primary School opened in Colindeep Lane in 1921, with a new building constructed in Woodfield Avenue in 1933. In 2011 the design and build for a new three form entry school was completed by The Kier Group and Sprunt Architects.

In September 1940, Colindale tube station and the Newspaper Library (rebuilt 1957) were bombed, and the site was visited by George VI and Queen Elizabeth, the late Queen Mother. A V-1 flying bomb hit Colindale Hospital on 1 July 1944, killing four members of the Women's Auxiliary Air Force.

=== Today ===
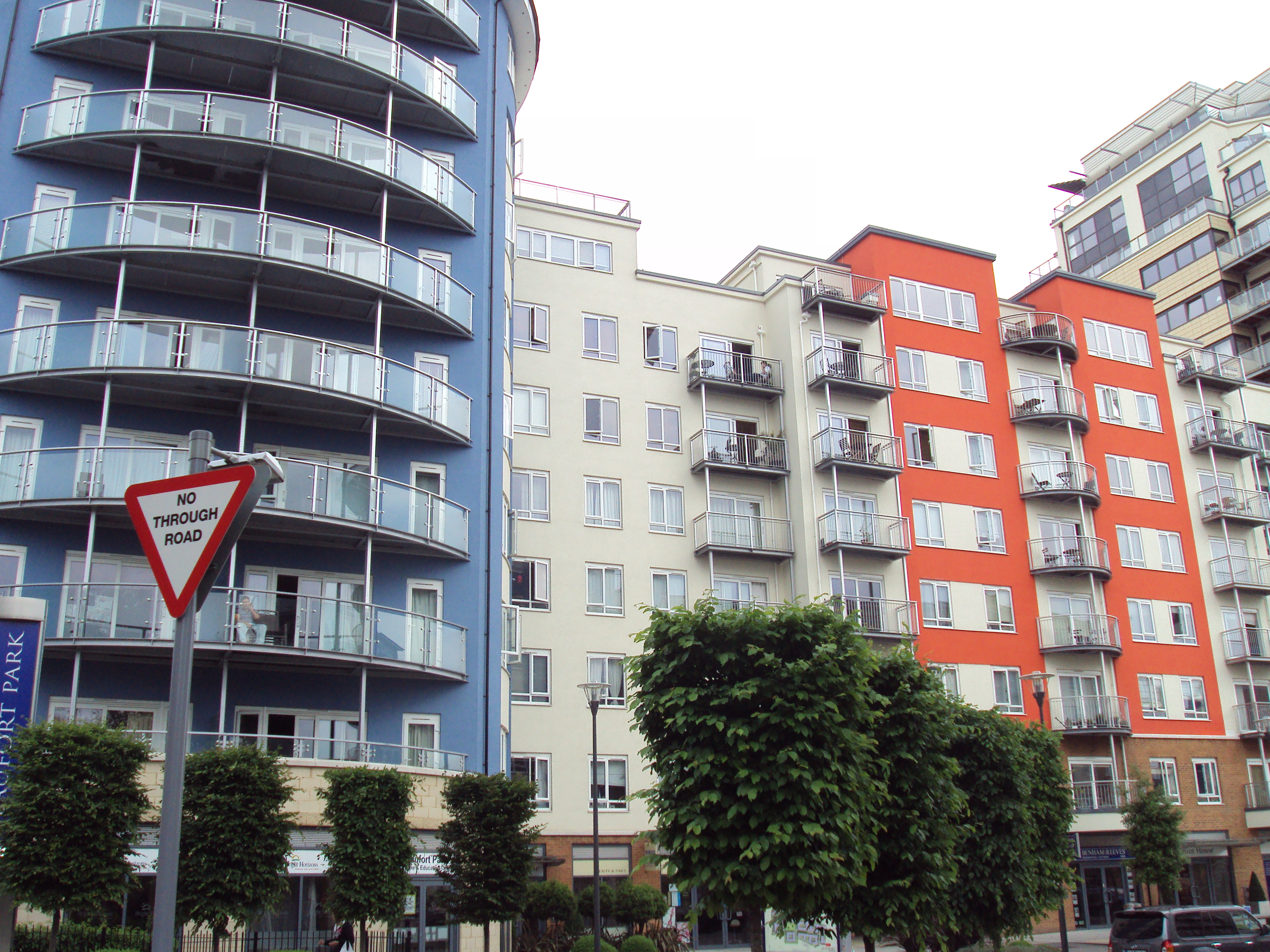
Beaufort Park new builds

Colindale houses many of North London's largest institutions, including the Royal Air Force Museum, Public Health England's Centre for Infections, the Colindale Campus of Barnet and Southgate College (opened August 2016) and the Peel Centre (better known as Hendon Police College). The British Library's newspaper depository was also in Colindale until it was closed in 2013 (replaced by a new depository in Boston Spa, West Yorkshire). The Oriental City was a mecca for London's East Asian community until its 2008 closure. A different complex for East Asian interests, Bang Bang Oriental Food Hall, has since been built in the area.

Also located here is the Grahame Park Estate, built on the former Hendon Aerodrome.

==== Development ====
Parts of Colindale have been designated by the Mayor of London in his London Plan as a 'proposed area of intensification'. As a result, Barnet Council designated a 'Colindale Area Action Plan' (AAP) and carried out public consultation events.

As of the 2010s, a major regeneration scheme has been underway, one of the largest regeneration schemes in North London.

Barnet Council identified Colindale as a neighbourhood for regeneration to improve its high levels of deprivation. Many of the London Borough of Barnet's council services moved to 2 Bristol Avenue in Colindale in 2019.

== Demography ==
The 2011 census showed that Colindale was the most ethnically diverse area of Barnet, with 59.9% of the population belonging to a minority background. In Colindale ward at the 2011 census, 23% of the population was White British, 15% Other White, 14% Black African, 11% Other Asian, 9% Indian and 5% Chinese. The most spoken foreign language was Romanian. Out of 6,290 households, 2,283 (36%) property tenures were owned, 2,157 (34%) socially rented, and 1,635 (26%) privately rented.

By the 2021 census, the area had been split into two wards, Colindale North and Colindale South. The total number of households in the area had almost doubled, to 11,941; of which 4,272 (36%) were owned, 3,229 (27%) socially rented, and 4,440 (37%) privately rented, indicating a relative rise in the proportion of private rentals.

Having the highest Chinese population in Barnet and one of the highest in London overall, Colindale has been referred to as a "mini-Chinatown", especially with the former Oriental City complex that was previously located in the area. This has been heightened by the Bang Bang Oriental Foodhall opening in the area and providing a community centre for the Chinese population.

Colindale is also home to Grahame Park, the largest post-war housing estate in Barnet and also the most deprived part of the borough.

== Geography ==
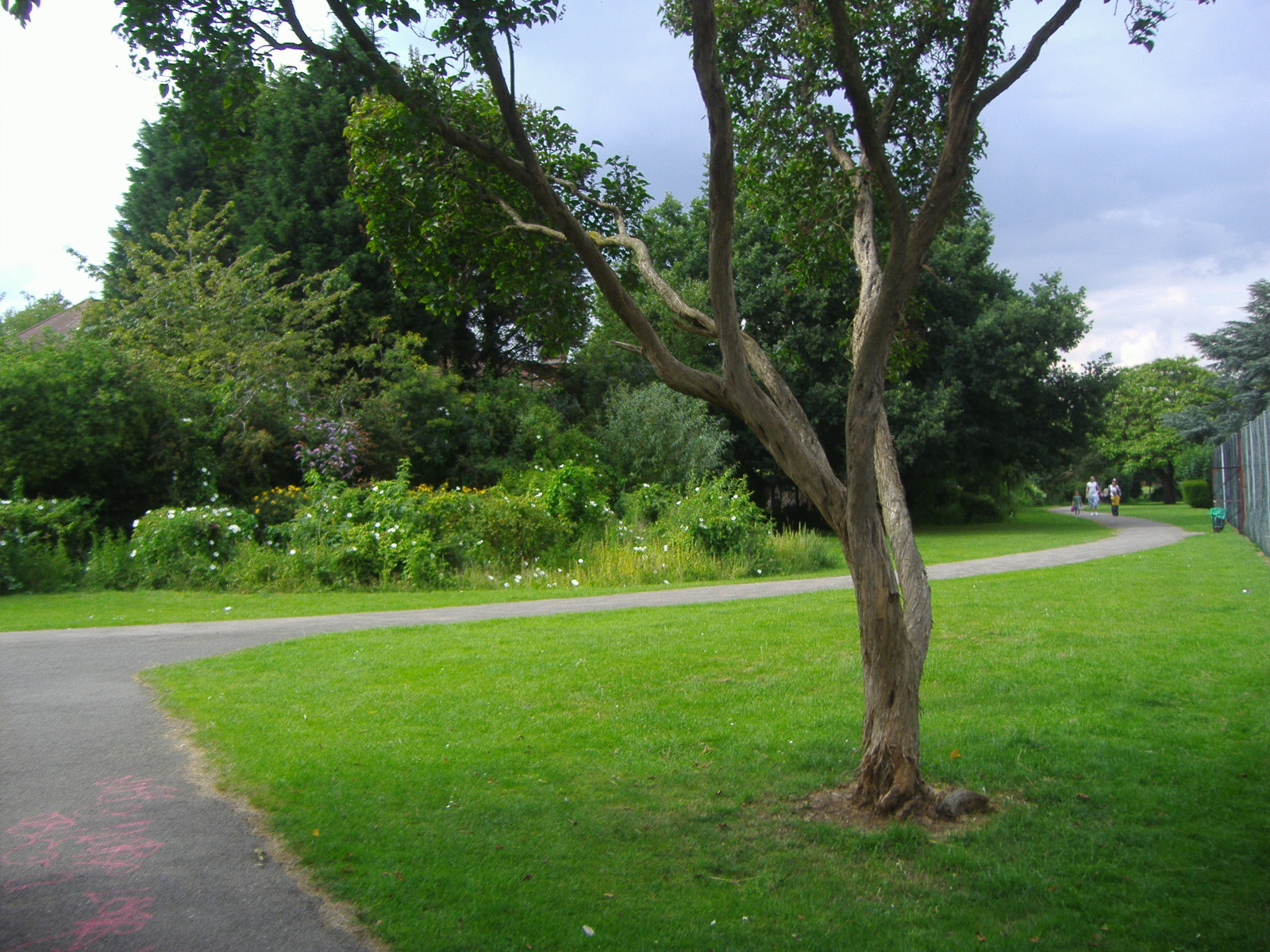
Trees in Rushgrove Park, Colindale

A small brook, a tributary of the River Brent called the Silk Stream, runs north to South. The area is home to several parks including Montrose Playing Fields, Silkstream Park, Heybourne Park and Colindale Park and a pond at Heybourne Park.

== Economy ==
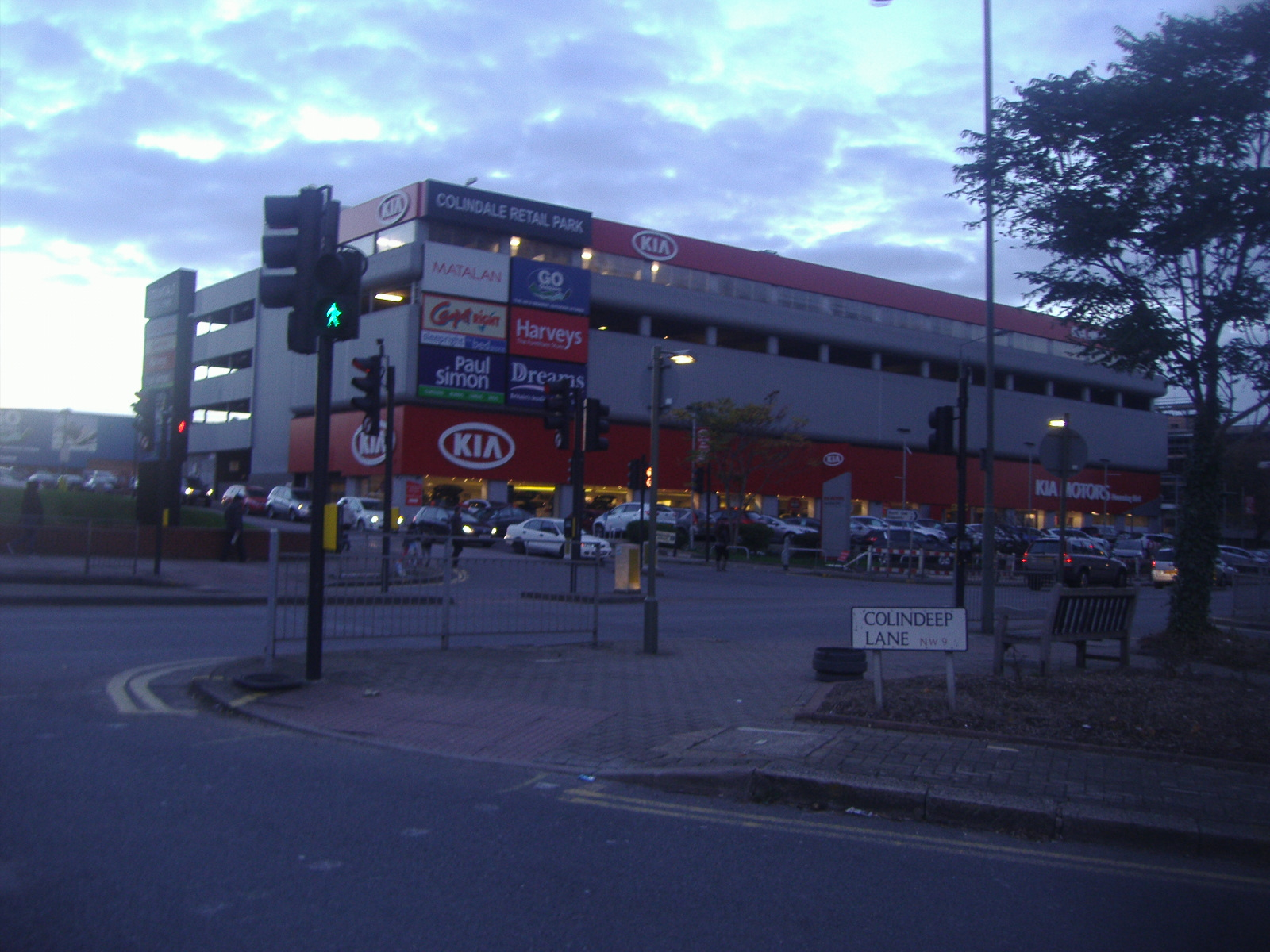
Colindale Retail Park

Argonaut Games once had its headquarters in Colindale. Oriental City was located in Colindale's Edgware Road until its closure and replaced by Bang Bang Oriental Food Hall.

== Transport ==
Colindale Tube Station

Colindale Underground station, on the Northern line's Edgware branch, is situated on the north side of the east-west Colindale Avenue.

Local London Buses are: 32, 125, 142, 186, 204, 292, 303, 324, 632, 642, N5, and N32.

== Politics and government ==
Colindale is part of the Hendon constituency for elections to the House of Commons of the United Kingdom.

Colindale is covered by Colindale North and Colindale South wards for elections to Barnet London Borough Council.
