= Whetstone, London =

Suburb of north London, England

Coordinates: 51.6260°N 0.1715°W

Whetstone
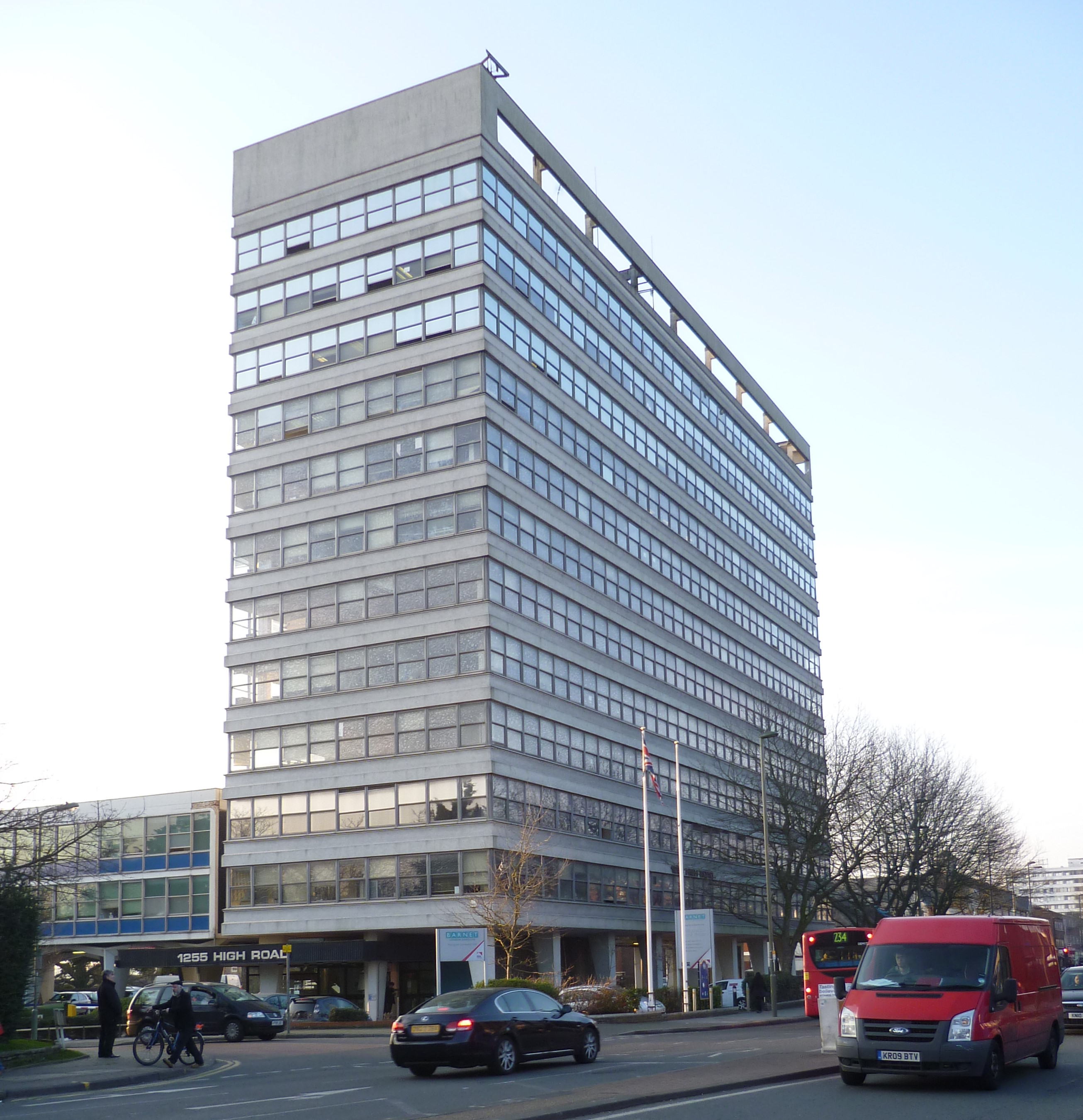
- Barnet House: formerly Barnet council offices, originally the Ever-Ready building, dominates the centre of Whetstone.

- Location within Greater London
- OS grid reference: TQ265935
- London borough: Barnet
- Ceremonial county: Greater London
- Region: London
- Country: England
- Sovereign state: United Kingdom
- Post town: LONDON
- Postcode district: N20
- Dialling code: 020
- Police: Metropolitan
- Fire: London
- Ambulance: London
- UK Parliament: Chipping Barnet
- London Assembly: Barnet and Camden

Whetstone /ˈwɛtstoʊn/ is a suburb of north London, in the London Borough of Barnet, bearing the postcode N20. It is served by an Underground station called Totteridge and Whetstone (Totteridge being to the west of Whetstone). Whetstone is around 7.8 miles north of Charing Cross. Prior to 1965 it was part of the Borough of Finchley.

The High Road is the A1000, formerly known as the Great North Road, parts of it still bear this name. Until the late 19th century its tiny developed area was one of two main settlements in the ancient parish of Friern Barnet, the other being Colney Hatch. It was thus the northernmost settlement in the Ossulstone hundred. Whetstone is also the northernmost part of the parish of Finchley.

== History ==
=== Early history ===
In medieval times the Hospitallers had a settlement nearby in Friern Barnet probably where Friary Park is now and alongside the old road to London. In 1340 the Bishop of London opened a gate into his park (the Highgate) which enabled a straight road across Finchley Common along the ridge there. The Hospitallers' settlement moved further west and became known as West Town, also known variously as "le Weston" (1398), "Wheston" (1417), and "Whetstonestret" (1439).

It was the northernmost settlement in the Ossulstone hundred.

Until the late 19th century its tiny developed area was one of two main settlements in the ancient parish of Friern Barnet, the other being Colney Hatch. Friern Barnet remained its ecclesiastical parish and its civil form was at that time giving way to urban and rural districts, in this case Friern Barnet Urban District.

=== The Whetstone ===
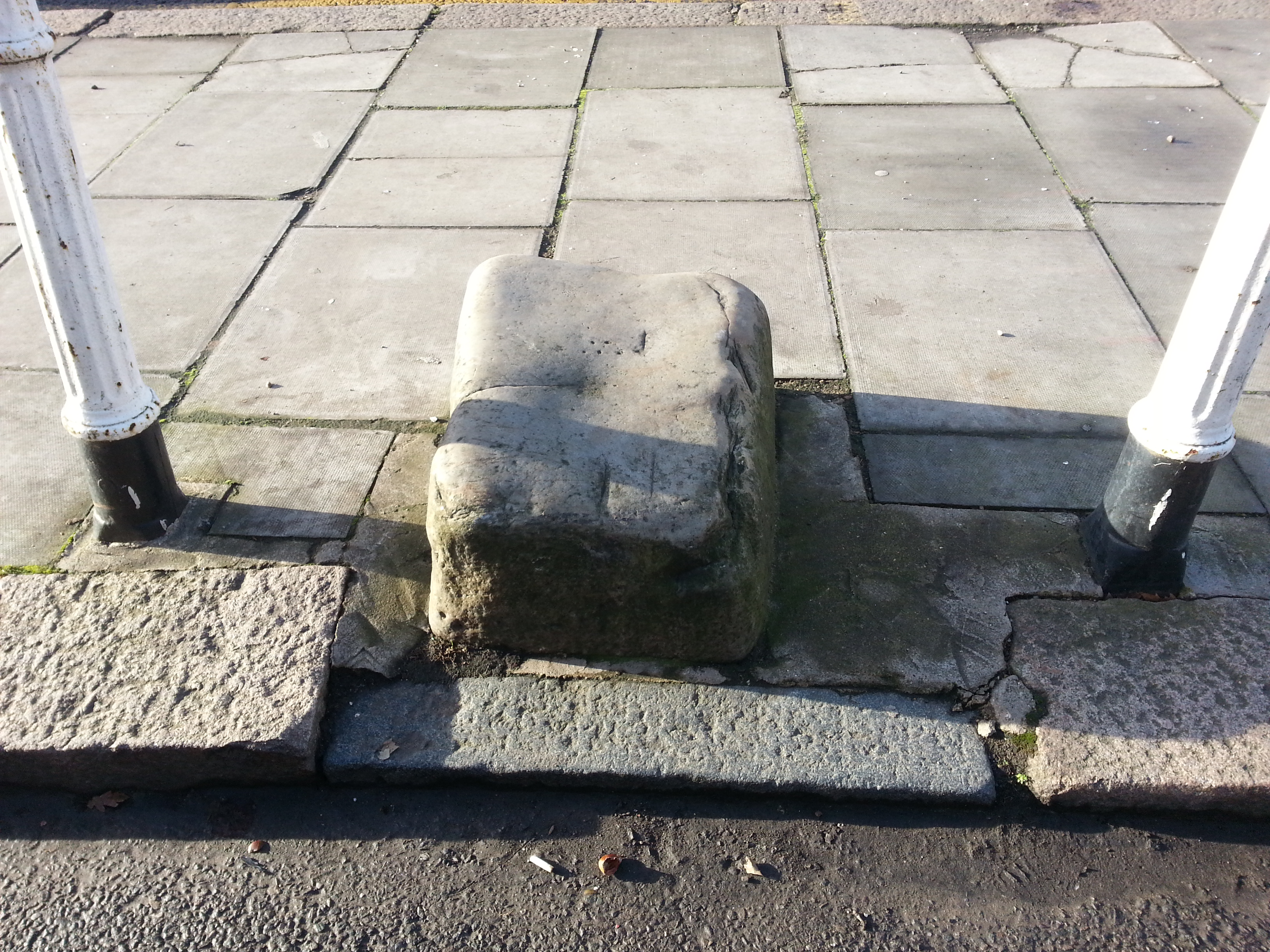
The Whetstone

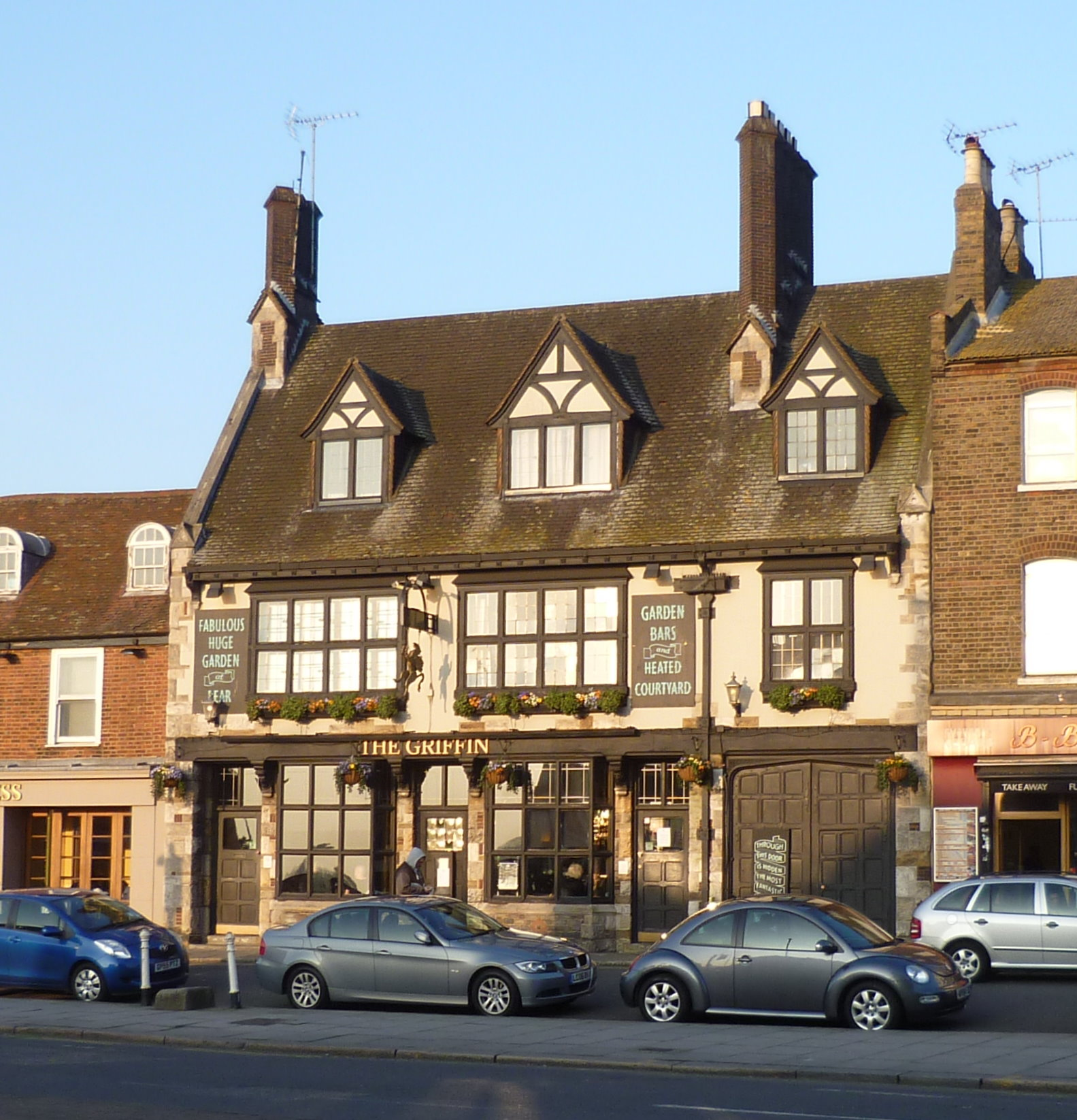
The Griffin pub with the Whetstone visible in the left foreground

John Heathfield of the Friern Barnet & District Local History Society writes that according to the Royal Commission on the Historical Monuments of England, the stone outside The Griffin public house commonly known as the Whetstone, is a mounting block, and if so "it would have been connected to the toll gate erected by the Whetstone & Highgate Turnpike Trust about 1730."

An historic legend regarding the whetstone itself tells that the stone was used by soldiers on their march towards High Barnet (approx. 3.5 miles north of Whetstone) in preparation for the battle of Barnet in 1471.

He also states that the earliest evidence for the existence of the stone is a photograph taken in 1861 which shows it much closer to The Griffin than it is now. The stone was moved to its present location when the toll gate was removed in 1863.

Until the late 19th century this was the northern hamlet, centred on a crossroads, of the medieval parish of Friern Barnet which stretched 3 miles (4.8 km) south-southeast and was half as wide as long. The very rural parish until then had one other main population centre, equally a hamlet, Colney Hatch.

== Geography ==
Whetstone is the northernmost part of the Finchley plateau. Whetstone lies about 312 feet (95 m) above sea level.

Swan Lane Open Space is a park in south Whetstone and the Dollis Valley Greenwalk along the bank of Dollis Brook passes through it.

== Transport ==
Whetstone has transport links with a national rail station on the Welwyn Garden City branch of the Thameslink network (Oakleigh Park Station, approx. one mile east of Whetstone high road), a TFL London underground station on the Northern line (Totteridge and Whetstone) and numerous TFL buses headed towards Walthamstow, Highbury, High Barnet, Brent Cross, Arnos Grove, Highgate, Muswell Hill, Edgware, Winchmore Hill, Trafalgar Square and Colindale.

Buses that serve Whetstone include the 125 from Winchmore Hill to Colindale, the 234 from Barnet, The Spires to Archway, the 263 from Barnet Hospital to Highbury Barn, the 383 from High Barnet to Finchley Memorial Hospital via Friary Park, the 34 from Walthamstow to Barnet Church, the 251 from Arnos Grove to Edgware, the 326 from Brent Cross to High Barnet and the N20 from High Barnet to Trafalgar Square.

Stations in the area are:

- Totteridge and Whetstone (Northern line)
- Oakleigh Park Thameslink

== See also ==
- Green Man, Whetstone
