= British Ever Ready Electrical Company =

British electrical firm

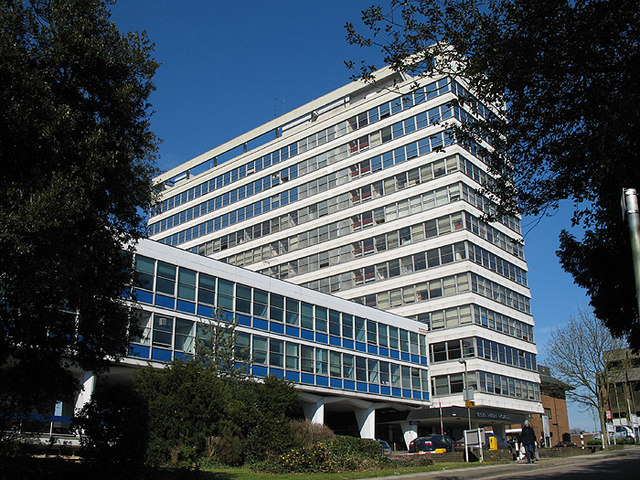
Barnet House (formerly Ever Ready House), 2007

The British Ever Ready Electrical Company (BEREC) was a British electrical firm formed in 1906 as the export branch of the American Eveready Battery Company. In 1914 it became independent of its American parent company.

For decades the firm dominated the UK consumer battery market and had several factories in the UK, the largest of which was built at Tanfield Lea, County Durham, in 1968. Other factories included Dawley, Four Ashes, Maldon, Newburn, London (Victoria Works, Forest Road and from 1936, the St Ann's Works in Harringay) and Park Lane, Wolverhampton. The company's research effort was centred upon the Central Laboratories, later known as Group Technical Centre, in St. Ann's Road, Harringay, London N15. The company's head office was Ever Ready House in Whetstone, London N20. Overseas manufacturing sites included South Africa, Nigeria, Sri Lanka and Jamaica. The company also included UK engineering divisions Cramic Engineering and Toolrite.

In 1972, the company acquired J. A. Crabtree & Co, a manufacturer of electrical accessories.

The company was the subject of a hostile takeover by Hanson Trust in 1981. Hanson closed factories, cut jobs and sold the German (Daimon) and Italian (Superpila) subsidiaries to Duracell. Shortly before this the British Ever Ready Electrical Company changed its name to Berec Group. From the 1950s the BEREC name was only used for exports of batteries and radio sets (as British Ever Ready Export Company). Some Daimon batteries were branded BEREC as were some produced in Switzerland. One of Hanson's first decisions was to revert from BEREC to Ever Ready as the UK brand.

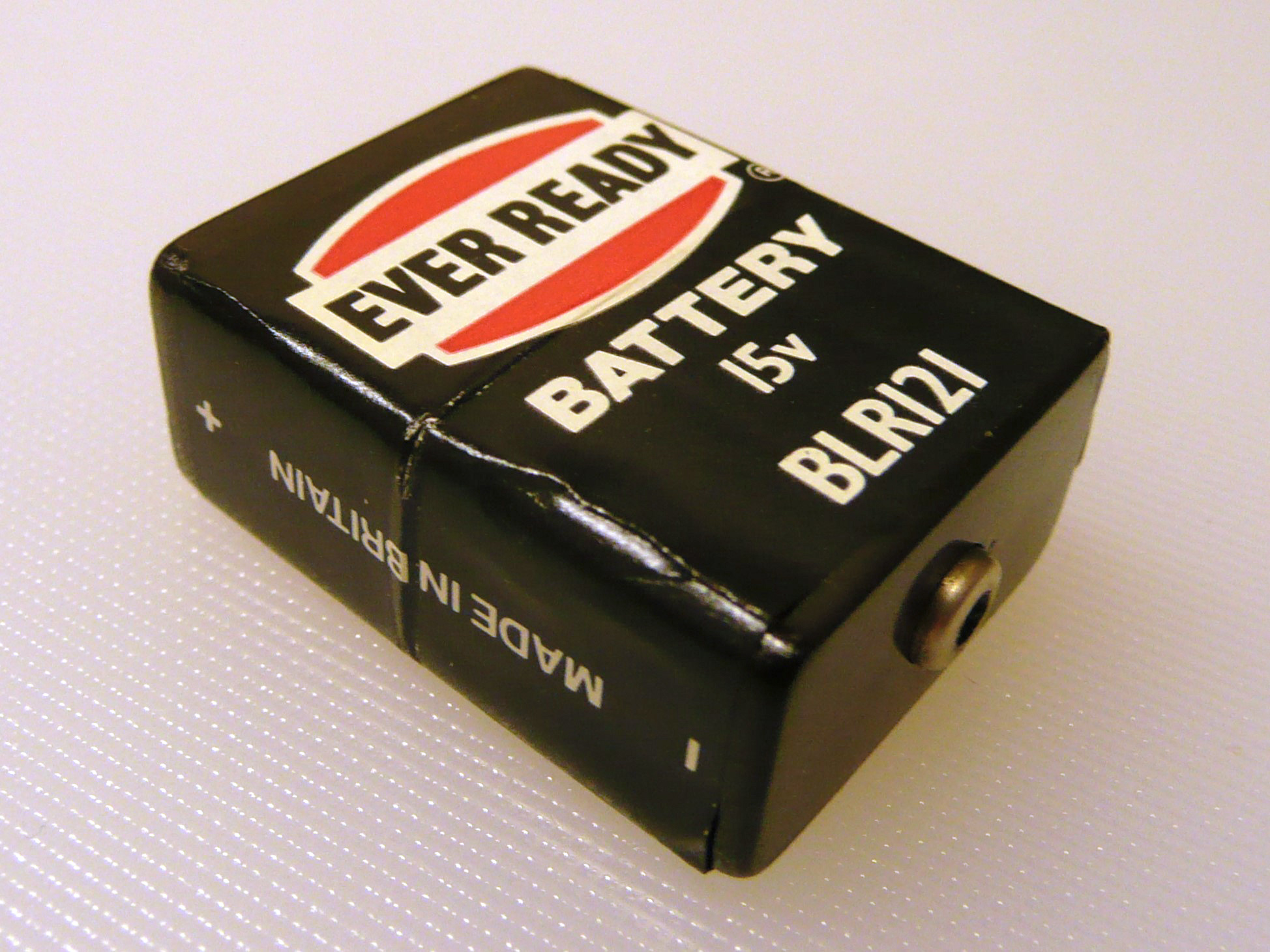
An old Ever Ready battery

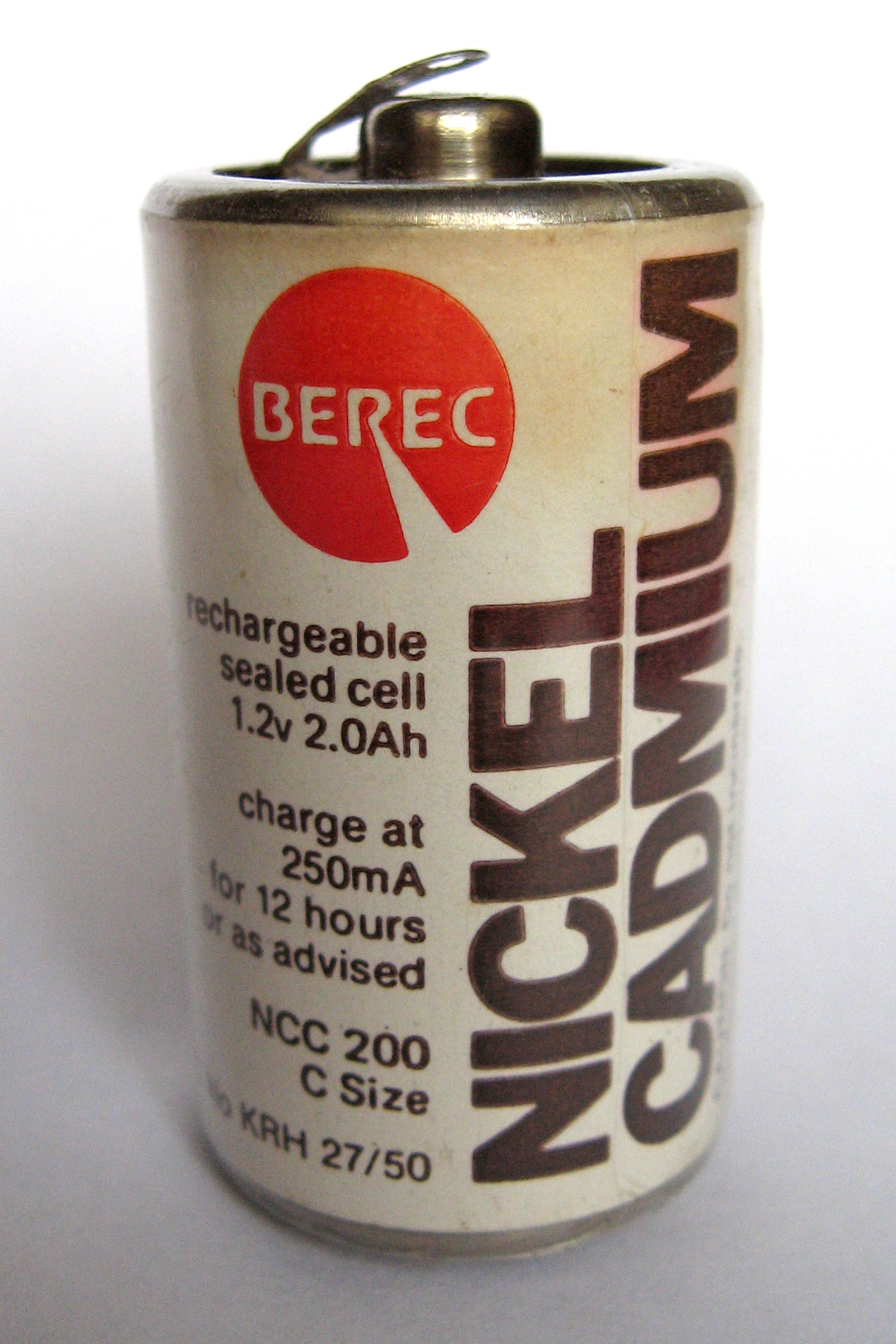
A BEREC-branded battery

In 1992, the company was sold by Hanson Trust to Ralston Purina, owners of the American Eveready company, and is now a part of Energizer Holdings. The company closed Tanfield Lea, its last UK factory, in 1996. Production of some Ever Ready batteries (PP6, PP7 and PP9) continued in the UK until 1999 by Univercell Battery Company, near the old Dawley factory, using the original machinery. Univercell moved to Stafford Park 12 and was sold to the AceOn Group in 2012; AceOn continued to manufacture Ever Ready batteries for specialist applications.

The company was also a producer of torches and bicycle lamps. Ever Ready also manufactured radios from 1934 up until 1964. Ever Ready owned a controlling interest in Lissen (which mainly made radio sets) from 1928. With the 1922 founder of Lissen forming Vidor in 1934, Ever Ready took over Lissen completely. Many models of radio set were manufactured in both Lissen and Ever Ready versions until 1941, when the Blitz ended production. From 1942 until 1945 only one Ever Ready radio model was produced. In 1981 three "offshore" models were produced, one from Hong Kong and two from Malaysia. The "Saucepan Special" radio was sold in large numbers to Africa. The Dawley factory was originally set up primarily to make B103 and B136 batteries for the Saucepan radio.

== See also ==
- Eveready East Africa
- P. R. Mallory and Co Inc
- Ucar batteries
