= List of MPs for constituencies in London (2019–2024) =

MPs of London constituencies from 2019 to 2024

- Colours on map indicate the party allegiance of each constituency's MP at the time of the election.

This is a list of the 73 members of parliament (MPs) who were elected to the House of Commons of the United Kingdom by London constituencies for the Fifty-Eighth Parliament of the United Kingdom (2019 to 2024) at the 2019 United Kingdom general election.

== Composition at 2019 election ==
Affiliation	Members
Labour	49
Conservative	21
Lib Dem	3
Total	73

== List ==
Constituency	MP	Party	Notes
Barking	Margaret Hodge	Labour	
Battersea	Marsha de Cordova	Labour	
Beckenham	Bob Stewart	Conservative	
Bermondsey and Old Southwark	Neil Coyle	Labour	
Bethnal Green and Bow	Rushanara Ali	Labour	
Bexleyheath and Crayford	David Evennett	Conservative	
Brent Central	Dawn Butler	Labour	
Brent North	Barry Gardiner	Labour	
Brentford and Isleworth	Ruth Cadbury	Labour	
Bromley and Chislehurst	Bob Neill	Conservative	
Camberwell and Peckham	Harriet Harman	Labour	
Carshalton and Wallington	Elliot Colburn	Conservative	
Chelsea and Fulham	Greg Hands	Conservative	
Chingford and Woodford Green	Iain Duncan Smith	Conservative	
Chipping Barnet	Theresa Villiers	Conservative	
Cities of London and Westminster	Nickie Aiken	Conservative	
Croydon Central	Sarah Jones	Labour	
Croydon North	Steve Reed	Labour Co-op	
Croydon South	Chris Philp	Conservative	
Dagenham and Rainham	Jon Cruddas	Labour	
Dulwich and West Norwood	Helen Hayes	Labour	
Ealing Central and Acton	Rupa Huq	Labour	
Ealing North	James Murray	Labour Co-op	
Ealing Southall	Virendra Sharma	Labour	
East Ham	Stephen Timms	Labour	
Edmonton	Kate Osamor	Labour Co-op	
Eltham	Clive Efford	Labour	
Enfield North	Feryal Clark	Labour	
Enfield Southgate	Charalambos "Bambos" Charalambous	Labour	
Erith and Thamesmead	Abena Oppong-Asare	Labour	
Feltham and Heston	Seema Malhotra	Labour Co-op	
Finchley and Golders Green	Mike Freer	Conservative	
Greenwich and Woolwich	Matthew Pennycook	Labour	
Hackney North and Stoke Newington	Diane Abbott	Labour	
Hackney South and Shoreditch	Meg Hillier	Labour Co-op	
Hammersmith	Andy Slaughter	Labour	
Hampstead and Kilburn	Tulip Siddiq	Labour	
Harrow East	Bob Blackman	Conservative	
Harrow West	Gareth Thomas	Labour Co-op	
Hayes and Harlington	John McDonnell	Labour	
Hendon	Matthew Offord	Conservative	
Holborn and St Pancras	Sir Keir Starmer	Labour	
Hornchurch and Upminster	Julia Lopez	Conservative	
Hornsey and Wood Green	Catherine West	Labour	
Ilford North	Wes Streeting	Labour	
Ilford South	Sam Tarry	Labour	
Islington North	Jeremy Corbyn	Labour	Sat as an Independent
Islington South and Finsbury	Emily Thornberry	Labour	
Kensington	Felicity Buchan	Conservative	
Kingston and Surbiton	Ed Davey	Liberal Democrat	
Lewisham Deptford	Vicky Foxcroft	Labour	
Lewisham East	Janet Daby	Labour	
Lewisham West and Penge	Ellie Reeves	Labour	
Leyton and Wanstead	John Cryer	Labour	
Mitcham and Morden	Siobhain McDonagh	Labour	
Old Bexley and Sidcup	James Brokenshire	Conservative	2021 by-election
Orpington	Gareth Bacon	Conservative	
Poplar and Limehouse	Apsana Begum	Labour	
Putney	Fleur Anderson	Labour	
Richmond Park	Sarah Olney	Liberal Democrat	
Romford	Andrew Rosindell	Conservative	
Ruislip, Northwood and Pinner	David Simmonds	Conservative	
Streatham	Bell Ribeiro-Addy	Labour	
Sutton and Cheam	Paul Scully	Conservative	
Tooting	Rosena Allin-Khan	Labour	
Tottenham	David Lammy	Labour	
Twickenham	Munira Wilson	Liberal Democrat	
Uxbridge and South Ruislip	Steve Tuckwell	Conservative	2023 by-election
Vauxhall	Florence Eshalomi	Labour Co-op	
Walthamstow	Stella Creasy	Labour Co-op	
West Ham	Lyn Brown	Labour	
Westminster North	Karen Buck	Labour	
Wimbledon	Stephen Hammond	Conservative	

== By-elections ==
- 2021 Old Bexley and Sidcup by-election, Louie French, Conservative
- 2023 Uxbridge and South Ruislip by-election, Steve Tuckwell, Conservative
