= Shanti S. Gupta =

Indian-American statistician (1925–2002)

- Born: January 25, 1925; Saunasi, Uttar Pradesh, British India
- Died: January 11, 2002 (aged 76); West Lafayette, Indiana
- Education: University of Delhi; University of North Carolina at Chapel Hill
- Known for: Ranking and selection theory
- Awards: Erskine Fellowship; Fellow of the AAAS; Fellow of the ASA; Fellow of the IMS
- Scientific career
- Fields: Statistics
- Workplaces: Bell Labs; Purdue University
- Thesis: On a Decision Rule for a Problem in Ranking Means
- Doctoral advisor: Raj Chandra Bose
- Doctoral students: John J. Deely; Raymond J. Carroll; Roger Lee Berger

President of Institute of Mathematical Statistics
- In office 1989–1990
- Preceded by: Ramanathan Gnanadesikan
- Succeeded by: David O. Siegmund

Head of the Department of Statistics, Purdue University
- In office 1968–1995
- Preceded by: (none)
- Succeeded by: Mary Ellen Bock

Shanti Swarup Gupta (January 25, 1925 – January 11, 2002) was an Indian-American statistician who served as the founding head of the department of statistics at Purdue University. He is best known for his pioneering work in ranking and selection theory, a branch of statistics used to determine the "best" populations among a group of candidates.

== Early life and education ==
Gupta was born in Saunasi, Uttar Pradesh, India. He attended the University of Delhi where he earned Bachelor of Arts and Master of Arts degrees in mathematics in 1943 and 1946, respectively. He then enrolled at the University of North Carolina at Chapel Hill, where he completed his Ph.D. in statistics in 1956 under the supervision of Raj Chandra Bose. His dissertation, titled On a Decision Rule for a Problem in Ranking Means, laid the groundwork for his future research in selection procedures.

== Career ==
After briefly working at Bell Labs, Gupta joined the faculty of Purdue University in 1962. At the time, statistics was part of the department of mathematics. In 1968, he became the founding head of Purdue's newly established department of statistics, a position he held until 1995. During his tenure, he transformed the department into a globally recognized center for statistical research. He authored or co-authored over 200 research papers and several influential books, most notably the 1979 Wiley publication Multiple Decision Procedures: Theory and Methodology of Selecting and Ranking Populations.

Shanti S. Gupta was a pivotal figure for the Journal of Statistical Planning and Inference, serving as an editor from its founding in 1977, then later as editor-in-chief during the late 1990s up until late 2001.

== Professional honors ==
Gupta was an active leader in the international statistics community. His contributions were recognized through several prestigious appointments, including:

- 1968: elected as Fellow of the Institute of Mathematical Statistics, and from 1989 to 1990 its president.
- 1970: elected as Fellow of the American Statistical Association.
- 1985: elected as Fellow of the American Association for the Advancement of Science.
- 1988: Erskine Fellowship at the University of Canterbury.

== Legacy ==
In honor of his contributions, Purdue University established the Shanti S. Gupta Distinguished Professorship in Statistics. He is credited with mentoring over 30 doctoral students, many of whom became prominent statisticians themselves.
