= Uxbridge and South Ruislip =

UK Parliament constituency (since 2010)

Coordinates: 51.54°N 0.44°W

- Borough constituency for the House of Commons
- Interactive map of boundaries from 2024
- Location within Greater London
- County: Greater London
- Electorate: 75,042 (March 2020)
- Major settlements: Uxbridge, South Ruislip, Ickenham, Hillingdon, Yiewsley

Current constituency
- Created: 2010
- Member of Parliament: Danny Beales (Labour)
- Seats: One
- Created from: Uxbridge (most); Ruislip-Northwood (part)

Uxbridge and South Ruislip is a constituency (Note: A county constituency (for the purposes of election expenses and type of returning officer).) in Greater London represented in the House of Commons of the UK Parliament since its 2010 creation. The seat has been held by Danny Beales of the Labour Party since July 2024.

From 2015 to 2023, the seat was held by former Prime Minister (2019–2022) Boris Johnson, of the Conservative Party. Johnson won the seat in 2015 with a majority of 10,695. In 2017, as Foreign Secretary, he won a narrower majority of 5,034 votes. In 2019, as Prime Minister, he won an increased majority of 7,210. Johnson formally resigned in June 2023 after receiving a copy of the Standard Committee's report into Partygate, which recommended a recall petition. The subsequent by-election was won by Conservative candidate Steve Tuckwell, who then lost the seat to Danny Beales in the 2024 general election.

An estimate by the House of Commons Library puts the "Leave" vote by the constituency in the 2016 referendum at 57.2%.

== Constituency profile ==
High Street, Uxbridge

Uxbridge and South Ruislip is a constituency in Greater London in England, within the Borough of Hillingdon. It covers the towns of Uxbridge and Yiewsley and the areas of South Ruislip, Cowley, Hillingdon, Ickenham and South Harefield.

This is a suburban constituency on the outskirts of London, located around 14 miles (23 km) west of the city centre. Uxbridge was traditionally a rural market town that served as a stopping point on the road between London and Oxford. It was absorbed into London's suburban expansion during the interwar period in a development of commuter residences known as Metro-land. The area contains numerous green spaces and is well-served by the London Underground. This constituency has average levels of wealth overall; there is some deprivation in Uxbridge and Yiewsley where most residents live in dense flats or terraces, whilst Ickenham and South Ruislip are affluent with many large detached houses. House prices across the constituency are generally higher than the UK average but lower than the rest of London.

Uxbridge and South Ruislip has above-average proportions of young and middle-aged adults and a small retired population; Brunel University of London, which has around 13,000 students, is located here. Residents have high rates of income, average levels of homeownership, and the child poverty rate is low. They are generally well-educated and a high proportion work in the business administration and education sectors. The percentage of residents claiming unemployment benefits is above-average.

Uxbridge and South Ruislip is an ethnically-diverse constituency. White people made up 57% of the population at the 2021 census, around one-fifth of whom were of non-British origin including Irish, Polish and Romanian communities. Asians, mostly of Indian origin, were the largest ethnic minority group at 26%. Black people made up 7% of residents.

At the local borough council, almost all seats in this constituency are represented by Conservatives, although Reform UK councillors were elected in Yiewsley. An estimated 57% of voters in Uxbridge and South Ruislip supported leaving the European Union in the 2016 referendum, higher than the UK-wide figure of 52%.

== History ==
The Conservative Party won in 2010 and 2015 by a margin of about 25%, and since 1970 the fourteen parliamentary elections in this constituency and its predecessor (the constituency of Uxbridge) were won by the Conservatives. The 2015 result gave the seat the 149th smallest majority of the Conservative Party's 331 seats by percentage of majority.

=== 2010–2017 ===
In 2010, for the Uxbridge-born Conservative candidate John Randall, the one-party swing in the seat was 0.1% greater than that seen nationally – enough on the newly drawn constituency boundaries to provide 48.3% of the vote, and a majority of more than 11,000 votes. In the 2010 and 2015 elections, three (of 8 and 13 candidates respectively) attained 5% or more of the vote, thus retaining their deposits.

In 2014, Boris Johnson was selected to run in the seat; he was elected in 2015 with a swing of less than 1% to Labour and 50.2% of the vote. However, the 2017 election saw a 13.6% increase in Labour's vote share, although Johnson also increased his votes, which reduced Johnson's majority to only 5,034, less than half his 2015 margin and by far the lowest for a Conservative candidate in the area since 2001.

=== 2019 general election ===
Boris Johnson became Prime Minister of the United Kingdom on 24 July 2019, following the resignation of Theresa May. His 2017 majority in Uxbridge and South Ruislip of 5,034 votes was the smallest of any sitting prime minister since 1924. The main challenger in the seat was the Labour Party, whose 2019 candidate was Ali Milani. In April 2019, think-tank Onward classified the seat as "vulnerable" for the Conservatives, while YouGov rated it on 27 November as "likely Conservative". An article in The Independent on the same date inferred a 22.2% chance of Milani winning the seat from odds by bookmaker Paddy Power. Johnson retained the seat with an increased vote share of 52.6% and an increased majority of 15%.

In 2019, two satirical candidates, Count Binface and Lord Buckethead, stood for election. The latter was the name of a character in the 1984 movie Gremloids. Several previous UK election candidates have used the name, but Jon Harvey was prevented from standing as such as Gremloids creator Todd Durham asserted his rights. Instead, an Official Monster Raving Loony used the name and Harvey stood as Count Binface. On 6 December, Lord Buckethead asked constituents to vote for Labour candidate Ali Milani. Also standing was William Tobin, who aimed to receive no votes. Still living abroad, as for the last 15 years, he was not able to vote in UK elections, but could stand as a candidate. Tobin stood to raise awareness of disenfranchisement (lack) of the vote for expatriates, as well as 16- and 17-year-olds and foreign nationals who live in the UK.

=== 2023 by-election ===
On 9 June 2023, Johnson announced his intention to resign, triggering the 2023 Uxbridge and South Ruislip by-election. The resignation occurred on 12 June 2023 and the by-election took place on 20 July 2023. It was won by the Tory candidate Steve Tuckwell, although with vote share reduced from 52.6% in 2019 to 45.2%, with Tuckwell beating Labour candidate Danny Beales by less than 500 votes.

=== 2024 general election ===
The latest election was held on Thursday, 4 July 2024. The seat was won by Labour candidate Danny Beales, who ousted Tory MP Steve Tuckwell after less than 12 months in office. Beales secured 16,599 votes (36.2%) compared to Tuckwell's 16,012 votes (34.9%). This was a reversal of the 2023 by-election (triggered by Boris Johnson's resignation), in which Tuckwell beat Beales by fewer than 500 votes (see below for full results). Other candidates running included: Reform UK candidate Tim Wheeler, Green Party candidate Sarah Green, and Liberal Democrats candidate Ian Rex-Hawkes.

== Boundaries ==
=== 2010–2024 ===
Map of 2010-2024 boundaries

Most of the constituency came from that of Uxbridge, which was first established under the Redistribution of Seats Act 1885; however parts of the seat came from Ruislip-Northwood and Hayes and Harlington, both of which had been carved out of the Uxbridge seat in 1950. The 1950 changes reflected the area's growth in population since 1918, the previous national reorganisation of seats.

The boundaries of the constituency changed prior to the general election in 2010 as Parliament approved the Fifth periodic review of Westminster constituencies. Ickenham and parts of West Ruislip were allocated to the new seat of Ruislip, Northwood and Pinner. Treating the constituency as the direct successor to the Uxbridge seat, it gained the electoral wards:

- Cavendish, South Ruislip and Manor.

The seat comprised the following electoral wards:

- Brunel, Cavendish, Hillingdon East, Manor, South Ruislip, Uxbridge North, Uxbridge South, and Yiewsley in the London Borough of Hillingdon

=== Current ===
Further to the 2023 review of Westminster constituencies, which came into effect for the 2024 general election, the constituency is composed of the following wards of the London Borough of Hillingdon:

- Colham & Cowley; Hillingdon East; Hillingdon West; Ickenham & South Harefield; Ruislip Manor; South Ruislip; Uxbridge; Yiewsley.

As a result of a new ward structure which came into effect in May 2022, the boundary with Ruislip, Northwood and Pinner was realigned, with the constituency gaining the Ickenham & South Harefield ward, but losing parts of the (redrawn) Eastcote and Ruislip wards.

== Members of Parliament ==
Years	Member	Party
Constituency created from Uxbridge and Ruislip-Northwood
2010	John Randall	Conservative
2015	Boris Johnson	Conservative
2023 by-election	Steve Tuckwell	Conservative
2024	Danny Beales	Labour

== Elections ==
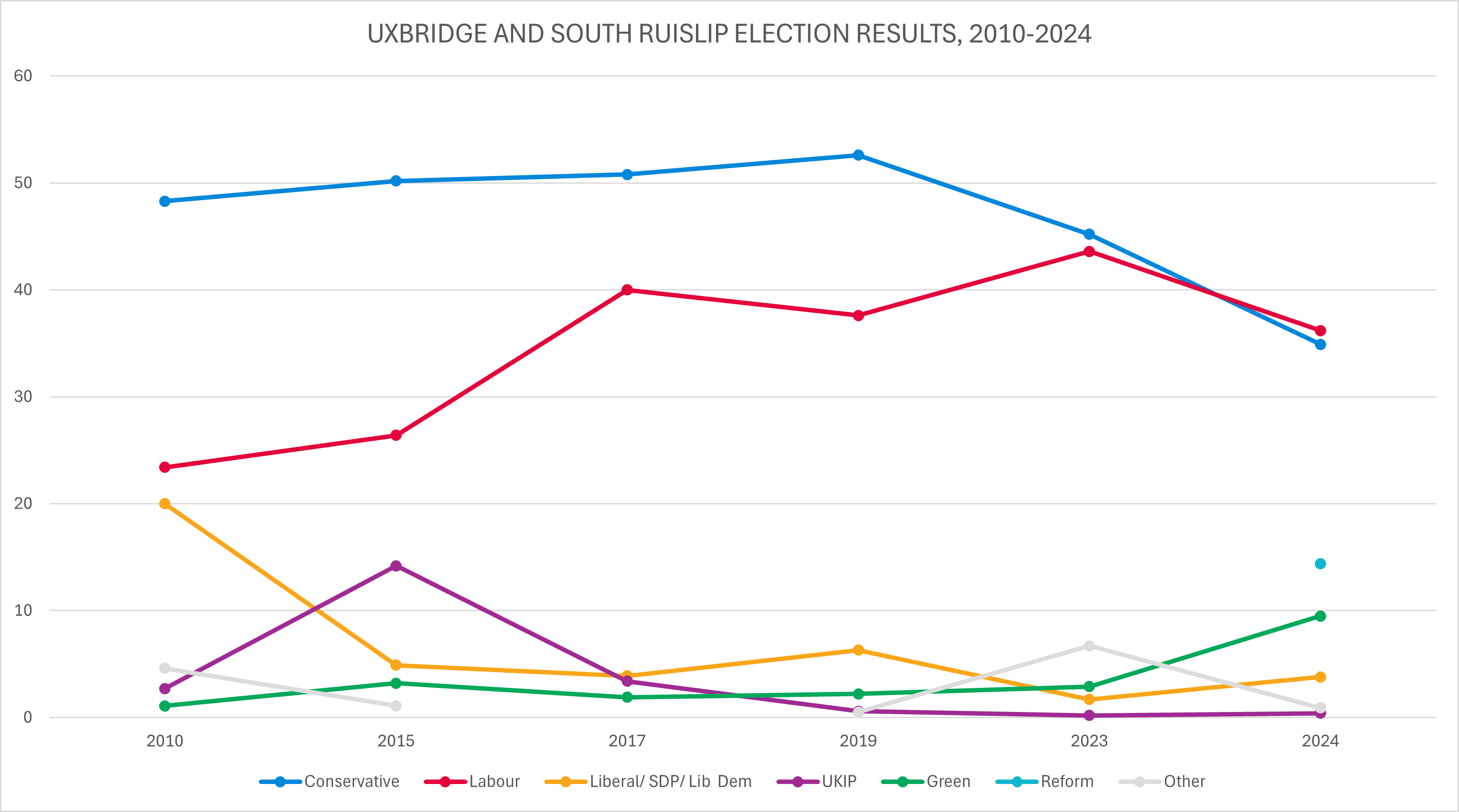
Election results 2010-2024

=== Elections in the 2020s ===
General election 2024: Uxbridge and South Ruislip
Party	Candidate	Votes	%	±%
Labour	Danny Beales	16,599	36.2	–0.8
Conservative	Steve Tuckwell	16,012	34.9	–17.7
Reform	Tim Wheeler	6,610	14.4	N/A
Green	Sarah Green	4,354	9.5	+6.8
Liberal Democrats	Ian Rex-Hawkes	1,752	3.8	–2.8
TUSC	Gary Harbord	223	0.5	N/A
SDP	Stephen Gardner	200	0.4	N/A
UKIP	Geoff Courtenay	164	0.4	–0.2
Majority		587	1.3	N/A
Turnout		45,914	61.4	–6.3
Registered electors		74,746		
Labour gain from Conservative		Swing	▲8.5	

Vote share changes for the 2024 election are compared to the notional results from the 2019 election, not the 2023 by-election.

2019 notional result
Party	Vote	%
Conservative	26,712	52.6
Labour	18,773	37.0
Liberal Democrats	3,371	6.6
Green	1,347	2.7
Others	579	1.2
Turnout	50,782	67.7
Electorate	75,042	

2023 Uxbridge and South Ruislip by-election
Party	Candidate	Votes	%	±%
Conservative	Steve Tuckwell	13,965	45.2	–7.4
Labour	Danny Beales	13,470	43.6	+6.0
Green	Sarah Green	893	2.9	+0.7
Reclaim	Laurence Fox	714	2.3	N/A
Liberal Democrats	Blaise Baquiche	526	1.7	–4.6
SDP	Steve Gardner	248	0.8	N/A
Independent	Kingsley Hamilton Anti-Ulez	208	0.7	N/A
Count Binface	Count Binface	190	0.6	+0.5
Independent	No-Ulez Leo Phaure	186	0.6	N/A
Rejoin EU	Richard Hewison	105	0.3	N/A
Let London Live	Piers Corbyn	101	0.3	N/A
Independent	Cameron Bell	91	0.3	N/A
CPA	Enomfon Ntefon	78	0.3	N/A
UKIP	Rebecca Jane	61	0.2	–0.4
Climate	Ed Gemmell	49	0.2	N/A
Monster Raving Loony	Howling Laud Hope	32	0.1	–0.2
Independent	77 Joseph	8	0.0	N/A
Majority		495	1.6	–13.4
Turnout		30,925	46.1	–22.4
Registered electors		67,067		
Conservative hold		Swing	–6.7	

=== Elections in the 2010s ===
General election 2019: Uxbridge and South Ruislip
Party	Candidate	Votes	%	±%
Conservative	Boris Johnson	25,351	52.6	+1.8
Labour	Ali Milani	18,141	37.6	–2.4
Liberal Democrats	Joanne Humphreys	3,026	6.3	+2.4
Green	Mark Keir	1,090	2.2	+0.3
UKIP	Geoffrey Courtenay	283	0.6	–2.8
Monster Raving Loony	Lord Buckethead	125	0.3	N/A
Independent	Count Binface	69	0.1	N/A
Independent	Alfie Utting	44	0.1	N/A
No description	Yace "Interplanetary Time Lord" Yogenstein	23	0.0	N/A
Independent	Norma Burke	22	0.0	N/A
	Bobby Smith	8	0.0	N/A
No description	William Tobin	5	0.0	N/A
Majority		7,210	15.0	+4.2
Turnout		48,187	68.5	+1.7
Registered electors		70,369		
Conservative hold		Swing	+2.1	

General election 2017: Uxbridge and South Ruislip
Party	Candidate	Votes	%	±%
Conservative	Boris Johnson	23,716	50.8	+0.6
Labour	Vincent Lo	18,682	40.0	+13.6
Liberal Democrats	Rosina Robson	1,835	3.9	–1.0
UKIP	Lizzy Kemp	1,577	3.4	–10.8
Green	Mark Keir	884	1.9	–1.3
Majority		5,034	10.8	–13.0
Turnout		46,694	66.8	+3.4
Registered electors		69,936		
Conservative hold		Swing	–6.5	

General election 2015: Uxbridge and South Ruislip
Party	Candidate	Votes	%	±%
Conservative	Boris Johnson	22,511	50.2	+1.9
Labour	Chris Summers	11,816	26.4	+3.0
UKIP	Jack Duffin	6,346	14.2	+11.5
Liberal Democrats	Michael Cox	2,215	4.9	–14.9
Green	Graham Lee	1,414	3.2	+2.1
TUSC	Gary Harbord	180	0.4	N/A
Independent	Jenny Thompson	84	0.2	N/A
Monster Raving Loony	Howling Laud Hope	72	0.2	N/A
Communities United	Sabrina Moosun	52	0.1	N/A
The Eccentric Party of Great Britain (UK)	Lord Toby Jug	50	0.1	N/A
Independent	Michael Doherty	39	0.1	N/A
The Realists' Party	Jane Lawrence	18	0.0	N/A
Independent	James Jackson	14	0.0	N/A
Majority		10,695	23.8	–1.1
Turnout		44,811	63.4	+0.1
Registered electors		70,631		
Conservative hold		Swing	–0.5	

General election 2010: Uxbridge and South Ruislip
Party	Candidate	Votes	%	±%
Conservative	John Randall*	21,758	48.3	
Labour	Sidharath Garg	10,542	23.4	
Liberal Democrats	Mike Cox	8,995	20.0	
BNP	Diane Neal	1,396	3.1	
UKIP	Mark Wadsworth	1,234	2.7	
Green	Mike Harling	477	1.1	
English Democrat	Roger Cooper	403	0.9	
National Front	Frank McCallister	271	0.6	
Majority		11,216	24.9	
Turnout		45,076	63.3	
Registered electors		71,160		
Conservative win (new seat)				

Source: BBC News
* Served as an MP in the 2005–2010 Parliament

== See also ==
- Parliamentary constituencies in London

== Notes ==
Parliament of the United Kingdom
Preceded by Maidenhead	Constituency represented by the prime minister 2019–2022	Succeeded by South West Norfolk
