= 2026 Hillingdon London Borough Council election =

Local election in England

- 7 May 2026

All 53 seats to Hillingdon London Borough Council 27 seats needed for a majority
	First party	Second party
Leader	Ian Edwards	Stuart Mathers
Party	Conservative	Labour
Last election	30 seats, 48.2%	23 seats, 41.5%
Seats before	31	16
Seats after	32	16
Seat change	▲2	▼7
Popular vote	83,502	45,304
Percentage	40.0%	21.7%
Swing	▼8.2pp	▼19.8pp
	Third party	Fourth party
Leader	TBC	Naser Abby
Party	Reform	Green
Last election	Did not stand	0 seats, 7.6%
Seats before	0	1
Seats after	4	1
Seat change	▲4	▲1
Popular vote	40,149	22,283
Percentage	19.2%	10.7%
Swing	▲19.2pp	▲3.1pp
- Map of the results of the 2026 Hillingdon London Borough Council election. Conservatives in blue, Labour in red, Green Party in green and Reform in light blue.
Leader before election
Ian Edwards
Conservative
Leader after election
Steve Tuckwell
Conservative

The 2026 Hillingdon London Borough Council election took place on 7 May 2026. All 53 members of Hillingdon London Borough Council were up for election. The elections took place alongside local elections in the other London boroughs and elections to local authorities across the United Kingdom.

The election saw the Conservatives retain their majority on the council. After the election, their incumbent leader, Ian Edwards, resigned as leader. The Conservatives then chose former MP Steve Tuckwell to be their new leader; he was formally appointed as the new leader of the council at the subsequent annual council meeting on 14 May 2026.

== Background ==
In the previous election in 2022, the Conservative Party maintained its control of the council despite losing 4 seats to the Labour Party.

== Council composition ==
After 2022 election		Before 2026 election		After 2026 election	
Party	Seats	Party	Seats	Party	Seats
Conservative	30	Conservative	30	Conservative	32
Labour	23	Labour	16	Labour	16
Hayes Independent Party	Not formed	Hayes Independent Party	5		
				Reform	4
Green	0	Green	1	Green	1

Changes 2022–2026:

- February 2024: Labina Basit (Labour) leaves party to sit as an independent
- March 2024: Alan Chapman (Conservative) resigns – by-election held May 2024
- May 2024: Kelly Martin (Conservative) wins by-election
- June 2025: Peter Curling (Labour) and Janet Gardner (Labour) leave party to sit as independents
- September 2025: Scott Farley (Labour) and Rita Judge (Labour) leave party to sit as independents
- October 2025:
  - Jas Dhot (Labour) joins Conservatives
  - Naser Abby (Labour) suspended from party
- January 2026: Hayes Independent Party formed – Labina Basit, Peter Curling, Scott Farley, Janet Gardner, and Rita Judge (Independent) join party
- February 2026:
  - Keith Burrows (Conservative) resigns – seat left vacant until election
  - Naser Abby (Independent) joins Greens
- Countermanded Poll
  - Hillingdon West Ward election took place on 18th June - CON HOLD - Cllr Adam Bennett & Cllr Reeta Chamdal 2026

== Election result ==
2026 Hillingdon London Borough Council election
Party	Candidates	Seats	Gains	Losses	Net gain/loss	Seats %	Votes %	Votes	+/−
Conservative	53	32	2	0	▲2	60.4	40.1	85,535	–8.1
Labour	53	16	0	7	▼7	30.2	21.6	46,136	–19.9
Reform	52	4	4	0	▲4	7.5	19.2	40,979	New
Green	33	1	1	0	▲1	1.9	10.8	22,977	+3.2
Liberal Democrats	39	0	0	0	Steady	0.0	5.0	10,554	+3.3
Hayes Ind.	14	0	0	0	Steady	0.0	2.2	4,726	New
Independent	5	0	0	0	Steady	0.0	0.8	1,605	+0.6
TUSC	5	0	0	0	Steady	0.0	0.2	356	-0.1
UKIP	2	0	0	0	Steady	0.0	0.1	154	Steady
SDP	1	0	0	0	Steady	0.0	0.1	127	-0.1

== Results by ward ==
=== Belmore ===
Belmore (3)
Party	Candidate	Votes	%	±%
Labour	Amanpreet Kaur	1,573	40.7	
Labour	Jagjit Singh	1,423	36.8	−33.9
Labour	Sital Punja	1,316	34.0	
Conservative	Kelly Bridges	900	23.3	
Conservative	Lauren Davies	863	22.3	
Green	Kahinde Johnson	767	19.8	
Conservative	Reva Gudi	752	19.5	
Reform	Steve Hardy	590	15.3	
Independent	Franclean Rajalingam	531	13.7	
Reform	Robert Quayle	519	13.4	
Reform	Peter Tee	494	12.8	
Hayes Ind.	Labina Basit	373	9.6	
Hayes Ind.	Dion Doherty	329	8.5	
Liberal Democrats	Jon North	215	5.6	
Turnout		3,866	34.11	−0.53
Labour hold				
Labour hold				
Labour gain from Hayes Ind.				

=== Charville ===
Charville (2)
Party	Candidate	Votes	%	±%
Conservative	Darran Davies	1,537	45.6	−5.0
Conservative	Archan Raval	1,197	35.5	
Labour	Eliza Castell	912	27.1	
Labour	Barry Nelson-West	812	24.1	−27.7
Reform	Roshan Bangay	600	17.8	
Reform	Gurjit Singh	531	15.8	
Green	Richard Pye	498	14.8	
Liberal Democrats	Graydon Rodwell	133	3.9	
Hayes Ind.	Chris Hills	87	2.6	
Hayes Ind.	Mike Usher	63	1.9	
UKIP	Shahana Khursheed	48	1.4	
Turnout		3,371	43.51	+4.80
Conservative gain from Labour				
Conservative hold				

=== Colham & Cowley ===
Colham & Cowley (3)
Party	Candidate	Votes	%	±%
Conservative	James Bourke	1,758	37.1	
Conservative	Shehryar Ahmad-Wallana	1,711	36.1	−14.1
Conservative	Adam Huddle	1,580	33.3	
Reform	Vicky Healan	1082	22.8	
Reform	Marion Hyde	1066	22.5	
Reform	Andrew Retter	1048	22.1	
Labour	Shamima Khanom	1027	21.7	
Labour	James Wainwright	937	19.8	
Labour	Ronak Masrani	911	19.2	
Green	Gabriella Saunders	721	15.2	
Green	Niall Murphy	716	15.1	
Liberal Democrats	Caroline Mutton	209	4.4	
Liberal Democrats	Majharul Miah	170	3.6	
Liberal Democrats	Arif Munir	148	3.1	
UKIP	Geoff Courtenay	106	2.2	−3.2
Turnout		4,741	39.74	+3.24
Conservative hold				
Conservative hold				
Conservative hold				

=== Eastcote ===
Eastcote (3)
Party	Candidate	Votes	%	±%
Conservative	Nick Denys	3,680	57.6	−7.8
Conservative	Ian Edwards	3,669	57.4	
Conservative	Daniel Singham	3,112	48.7	−13.5
Reform	Barry King	1,064	16.6	
Green	Bernice Rogers	1,019	15.9	
Labour	Harjot Gill	965	15.1	
Reform	Spencer Lisi	939	14.7	
Labour	Elizabeth Saunders	888	13.9	
Reform	Manjinder Singh	826	12.9	
Labour	Arnold Mukuvare	701	11.0	
Liberal Democrats	Susan Killip	616	9.6	
Liberal Democrats	Hilary Sculthorp	449	7.0	
Liberal Democrats	Satjit Singh	355	5.6	
TUSC	Tim Henry	113	1.8	0.4
Turnout		6,391	50.22	+8.12
Conservative hold				
Conservative hold				
Conservative hold				

=== Harefield Village ===
Harefield Village (1)
Party	Candidate	Votes	%	±%
Conservative	Tommy Balaam	980	45.3	
Reform	Gerard Barry	816	37.8	
Liberal Democrats	Jonathan Banks	200	9.3	
Labour	Malcolm Widgington	165	7.6	
Turnout		2161	53.34	+13.39
Conservative hold				

=== Hayes Town ===
Hayes Town (3)
Party	Candidate	Votes	%	±%
Labour	Stuart Mathers	1,022	30.9	
Labour	Navnit Dhesi	987	29.8	
Labour	Raju Sansarpuri	844	25.5	−49.1
Green	Mustafa El-Shetob	696	21.0	
Conservative	Christine Moore	608	18.4	
Conservative	Amerjit Kalirai	581	17.5	
Reform	Rosemary Barker	577	17.4	
Conservative	Hanna Ali	576	17.4	
Reform	Andy Enstone	532	16.1	
Reform	Gurcharan Singh	497	15.0	
Hayes Ind.	Janet Gardner	465	14.0	
Independent	Omar Ali	412	12.4	
Hayes Ind.	Peter Curling	366	11.1	
Hayes Ind.	Hari Bhandari	354	10.7	
Liberal Democrats	Shahid Baig	277	8.4	
Liberal Democrats	Hilary Leighter	223	6.7	
Independent	Mustapha B. Sowe	93	2.8	
Turnout		3,311	30.75	+2.45
Labour gain from Hayes Ind.				
Labour gain from Hayes Ind.				
Labour hold				

=== Heathrow Villages ===
Heathrow Villages (2)
Party	Candidate	Votes	%	±%
Labour	Narinder Garg	803	25.8	
Reform	Matthew Elder	798	25.7	
Labour	Bharat Singh Thind	754	24.2	
Conservative	Darren Brian Upjohn	630	20.3	
Conservative	Sanjiv Bisnauthsing	618	19.9	
Reform	Ali Salimian	577	18.6	
Green	Christine West	534	17.2	
Independent	Mario Quadros	407	13.1	
Green	David Williams	404	13.0	
Independent	Vishal Mistry	162	5.2	
Liberal Democrats	Kim Mathulla Mathen	145	4.7	
Turnout		3110	33.87	+4.27
Labour hold				
Reform gain from Labour				

=== Hillingdon East ===
Hillingdon East (3)
Party	Candidate	Votes	%	±%
Conservative	Wayne Bridges	2,065	45.4	
Conservative	Kelly Martin	1,895	41.7	
Conservative	Colleen Sullivan	1,858	40.9	
Reform	Ifan Evans	894	19.7	
Reform	Linda King	890	19.6	
Labour	Katy Armitage	871	19.2	
Labour	John Campbell	820	18	
Green	Eli Ross	789	17.4	
Reform	Tony Yusuf-Adam	777	17.1	
Labour	Oliwia Molinska	696	15.3	
Liberal Democrats	Tom Cottew	389	6.4	
Liberal Democrats	Zachary Huddle	378	8.3	
Liberal Democrats	Chowdhury Shamsuddin	333	7.3	
SDP	Steve Gardner	127	2.8	
TUSC	Julia Leonard	75	1.7	
Turnout		4545	41.41	+9.61
Conservative hold				
Conservative hold				
Conservative hold				

=== Hillingdon West ===
The vote for Hillingdon West has been postponed until 18 June 2026, following the death of Shaun Cooling, one of the Reform UK candidates.

Hillingdon West (2)
Party	Candidate	Votes	%	±%
Conservative	Adam Bennett	1,084	46.7	
Conservative	Reeta Chamdal	949	40.9	
Labour	Tiff Beales	470	20.2	
Reform	Margaret Forrest	433	18.7	
Reform	Justin Anderson	397	17.1	
Labour	Imran Razak	362	15.6	
Green	Ruhi Patel	353	15.2	
Green	Alicia Windsor	341	14.7	
Liberal Democrats	Muhammad Iqbal	63	2.7	
Liberal Democrats	Gautam Sabarwal	49	2.1	
Turnout		2,329	33.95	
Rejected ballots		8		
Registered electors		6,860		
Conservative hold				
Conservative hold				

=== Ickenham & South Harefield ===
Ickenham and South Harefield (3)
Party	Candidate	Votes	%	±%
Conservative	Jane Palmer	2,842	48.1	
Conservative	Eddie Lavery	2,811	47.6	
Conservative	Kaushik Banerjee	2,482	42.0	
Reform	Erica Moss	1,335	22.6	
Reform	Howard Dini	1,294	21.9	
Green	Sonia Gadhavi	937	15.9	
Green	Nav Sethi	841	14.2	
Green	Rose-Marie Adams	768	13.0	
Labour	Ben Nelson-West	735	12.4	
Labour	Sandra Roby	729	12.3	
Labour	Alex Sim	714	12.1	
Liberal Democrats	Alan Masters	350	5.9	
Liberal Democrats	Tariq Mahmood	272	4.6	
Turnout		5911	51.31	+10.11
Conservative hold				
Conservative hold				
Conservative hold				

=== Northwood ===
Northwood (2)
Party	Candidate	Votes	%	±%
Conservative	Henry Higgins	2,051	53.0	−8.9
Conservative	Ekta Gohil	2,037	52.6	
Green	Scott Miles	515	13.3	+7.5
Reform	Karl Lawrence	423	10.9	
Labour	Roshan Ghei	405	10.5	
Liberal Democrats	Mary Gregory	388	10.0	
Reform	Sofia Myers	384	9.9	
Labour	Sandeep Kaur	355	9.2	
Liberal Democrats	Eugene Dalton-Ruark	297	7.7	
Turnout		3869	43.5	+5.03
Conservative hold				
Conservative hold				

=== Northwood Hills ===
Northwood Hills (2)
Party	Candidate	Votes	%	±%
Conservative	Jonathan Bianco	2,092	53.2	
Conservative	Ranjeet Rathore	1,902	48.4	
Green	Zahra Latif	638	16.2	
Green	Steve Edmeades	629	16.0	
Reform	Kirk Clugston	620	15.8	
Reform	Karen Retter	606	15.4	
Labour	Mohinder Birah	412	10.5	
Labour	Alan Darbin	412	10.5	
Liberal Democrats	Ulla Mallick	171	4.3	
Liberal Democrats	Saghaer Mallick	154	3.9	
Turnout		3932	46.37	+10.97
Conservative hold				
Conservative hold				

=== Pinkwell ===
Pinkwell (3)
Party	Candidate	Votes	%	±%
Labour	Tony Gill	1,514	38.9	
Labour	Tony Eginton	1,405	36.1	
Labour	Kuldeep Lakhmana	1,348	34.6	
Conservative	Haq Nawaz	865	22.2	
Conservative	Alexander Old	769	19.8	
Green	Lucie West	726	18.7	
Reform	Gregory Charvy	702	18.0	
Reform	Kuldeep Jhala	621	16.0	
Conservative	Syed Quadry	560	14.4	
Reform	Nadeem Rajput	528	13.6	
Hayes Ind.	Jasvinder Dhillon	469	12.1	
Hayes Ind.	Hashim Sheikh	347	8.9	
Liberal Democrats	Peter Dollimore	315	8.1	
Liberal Democrats	Thessiver Nawaz	241	6.2	
Turnout		3891	34.12	+4.80
Labour hold				
Labour hold				
Labour hold				

=== Ruislip ===
Ruislip (3)
Party	Candidate	Votes	%	±%
Conservative	Philip Corthorne	3,553	57.5	−11.5
Conservative	Peter Smallwood	3,420	55.4	−10.6
Conservative	John Riley	3,362	54.5	11.8
Reform	Margaret Heritage	1,161	18.8	
Reform	Louis Hughes	1,129	18.3	
Reform	Sean McSharry	1,099	17.8	
Green	Andrew Blakie	787	12.7	
Labour	Sarah Askam	786	12.7	
Labour	Simon Eckley	684	11.1	
Labour	Jaya Punja	590	9.6	
Liberal Democrats	Kevin Aleong	505	8.2	
Liberal Democrats	Tolga Uyanik	382	6.2	
Turnout		6,174	52.87	+11.07
Conservative hold				
Conservative hold				
Conservative hold				

=== Ruislip Manor ===
Ruislip Manor (2)
Party	Candidate	Votes	%	±%
Conservative	Douglas Mills	2,097	25.9	
Conservative	Susan O'Brien	2,072	25.6	
Reform	Tony Prothero	905	11.2	
Reform	Timothy Wheeler	893	11.0	
Labour	Paul Espley	695	8.6	
Green	Leila Akinwale	591	7.3	
Labour	Arshpreet Singh	518	6.4	
Liberal Democrats	Miguel Santos	313	3.9	
Turnout		4194	53.16	+11.56
Conservative hold				
Conservative hold				

=== South Ruislip ===
South Ruislip (3)
Party	Candidate	Votes	%	±%
Conservative	Steve Tuckwell	3,021	55.9	
Conservative	Richard Mills	2,663	49.3	
Conservative	John Garner	2,532	46.9	
Reform	Richard Sellars	1002	18.5	
Reform	Tejpal Barnes	969	17.9	
Reform	Sandeep Andhrutkar	900	16.7	
Labour	Sarah Ryder	880	16.3	
Labour	Katrina Phenyo	790	14.6	
Green	Svavar Svavarsson	783	14.5	
Labour	Joseph Kirrane	762	14.1	
Liberal Democrats	Karen Banks	333	6.2	
Liberal Democrats	Andy Bell	283	5.2	
Liberal Democrats	Gavin Coleman	195	3.6	
Turnout		5403	45.39	+9.49
Conservative hold				
Conservative hold				
Conservative hold				

=== Uxbridge ===
Uxbridge (3)
Party	Candidate	Votes	%	±%
Conservative	Terence Murray	1,715	36.3	
Conservative	Riley Russell	1,705	36.0	
Conservative	Anil Taneja	1,569	33.2	
Labour	Tony Burles	1121	23.7	−22.0
Labour	Masoud Dildar	980	20.7	
Labour	Boikanyo Trust Phenyo	907	19.2	
Reform	Gerry Anderson	808	17.1	
Reform	Douglas Lewis	761	16.1	
Reform	Stephen Lewis	736	15.6	
Green	Andy Panayiotou	646	13.7	+4.8
Green	Amjad Ali	634	13.4	
Green	Peter Ryerson	623	13.2	
Liberal Democrats	Sajid Iqbal	393	8.3	
Liberal Democrats	Max Peston	380	8.0	
Liberal Democrats	Syed Shah	374	7.9	
TUSC	Gary Harbord	86	1.8	−1.5
Turnout		4730	42.12	+3.12
Conservative hold				
Conservative gain from Labour				
Conservative hold				

=== West Drayton ===
West Drayton (3)
Party	Candidate	Votes	%	±%
Reform	Paul Capps	1,353	29.3	
Green	Sarah Hassoun	1,182	25.6	
Labour	Jan Sweeting	1,166	25.2	
Labour	Steve Garelick	1,149	24.9	
Reform	Hetal Upadhyay	1,122	24.3	
Reform	Amir Parsayan	1,083	23.4	
Labour	Mohammed Islam	1,059	22.9	
Green	Edward Rowe	1,034	22.4	
Green	Piers Holden	1,026	22.2	
Conservative	Chris Smallwood	960	20.8	
Conservative	Sachin Bansal	948	20.5	
Conservative	Mohammed Rab	717	15.5	
Liberal Democrats	David Howell	243	5.3	
Turnout		4,621	38.6	+4.5
Reform gain from Labour				
Green gain from Hayes Ind.				
Labour hold				

=== Wood End ===
Wood End (3)
Party	Candidate	Votes	%	±%
Labour	Elizabeth Dumergue	1,327	32.8	
Labour	Kamal Preet Kaur	1,254	31.0	
Labour	Gursharan Mand	1,203	29.7	
Green	Naser Abby	948	23.4	
Conservative	Oliver Cadore	805	19.9	
Green	Izabela Iskra	779	19.3	
Green	Maureen Natumi	742	18.3	
Reform	Philip Gillman	718	17.8	
Reform	Reginald Toms	687	17.0	
Conservative	Naeha Menon	664	16.4	
Conservative	Mary O'Connor	649	16.0	
Reform	Neil Warrillow	638	15.8	
Hayes Ind.	Ahmad Rafique	341	8.4	
Hayes Ind.	Danielle Watson	315	7.8	
Hayes Ind.	Rakesh Kumar	281	6.9	
Liberal Democrats	Christine Hooper	225	5.6	
TUSC	Jason Buck	48	1.2	
Turnout		4045	33.39	+5.19
Labour hold				
Labour hold				
Labour hold				

=== Yeading ===
Yeading (2)
Party	Candidate	Votes	%	±%
Labour	Hedson Farinha De Castro	834	28.5	
Labour	Elizabeth Garelick	814	27.8	
Conservative	Jas Dhot	588	20.1	
Reform	Viral Desai	577	19.7	
Reform	Promila Deswal	531	18.2	
Hayes Ind.	Scott Farley	504	17.2	
Conservative	Rosie Giddings	492	16.8	
Hayes Ind.	Karina Marqvardt	432	14.8	
Green	Sarah West	263	9.0	
Liberal Democrats	Melanie Winterbotham	159	5.4	
Turnout		2925	34.41	+6.11
Labour gain from Conservative				
Labour gain from Hayes Ind.				

=== Yiewsley ===
Yiewsley (2)
Party	Candidate	Votes	%	±%
Reform	Sophie Dror	726	27.5	
Reform	Stacey Lucas	721	27.3	
Labour	David Balghan	714	27.0	
Labour	Sagal Ismail Saed	615	23.3	
Green	Sonia Caetano	571	21.6	
Conservative	Elizabeth Moses	501	19.0	
Conservative	Sriram Tanjore	488	18.5	
Green	Damian Laprus	476	18.0	
Liberal Democrats	Robert Danavell	119	4.5	
Liberal Democrats	Mahtab Ahammad	110	4.2	
TUSC	Derek Marsdon	34	1.3	
Turnout		2640	33.14	+4.84
Reform gain from Labour				
Reform gain from Labour				

== Results ==
Seat share
Conservative Party	60.4
Labour Party	30.2
Reform UK	7.5
Green Party of England and Wales	1.9

Vote share
Conservative Party	40.0%
Labour Party	21.7%
Reform UK	19.2%
Green Party of England and Wales	10.7%
Liberal Democrats	7.4%
UK Independence Party	0.8%
Trade Unionist and Socialist Coalition	0.2%
Social Democratic Party	0.1%
