= 2023 Uxbridge and South Ruislip by-election =

Election in London parliamentary constituency

- 20 July 2023

Uxbridge and South Ruislip constituency
- Turnout: 46.2% (▼17.3 pp)
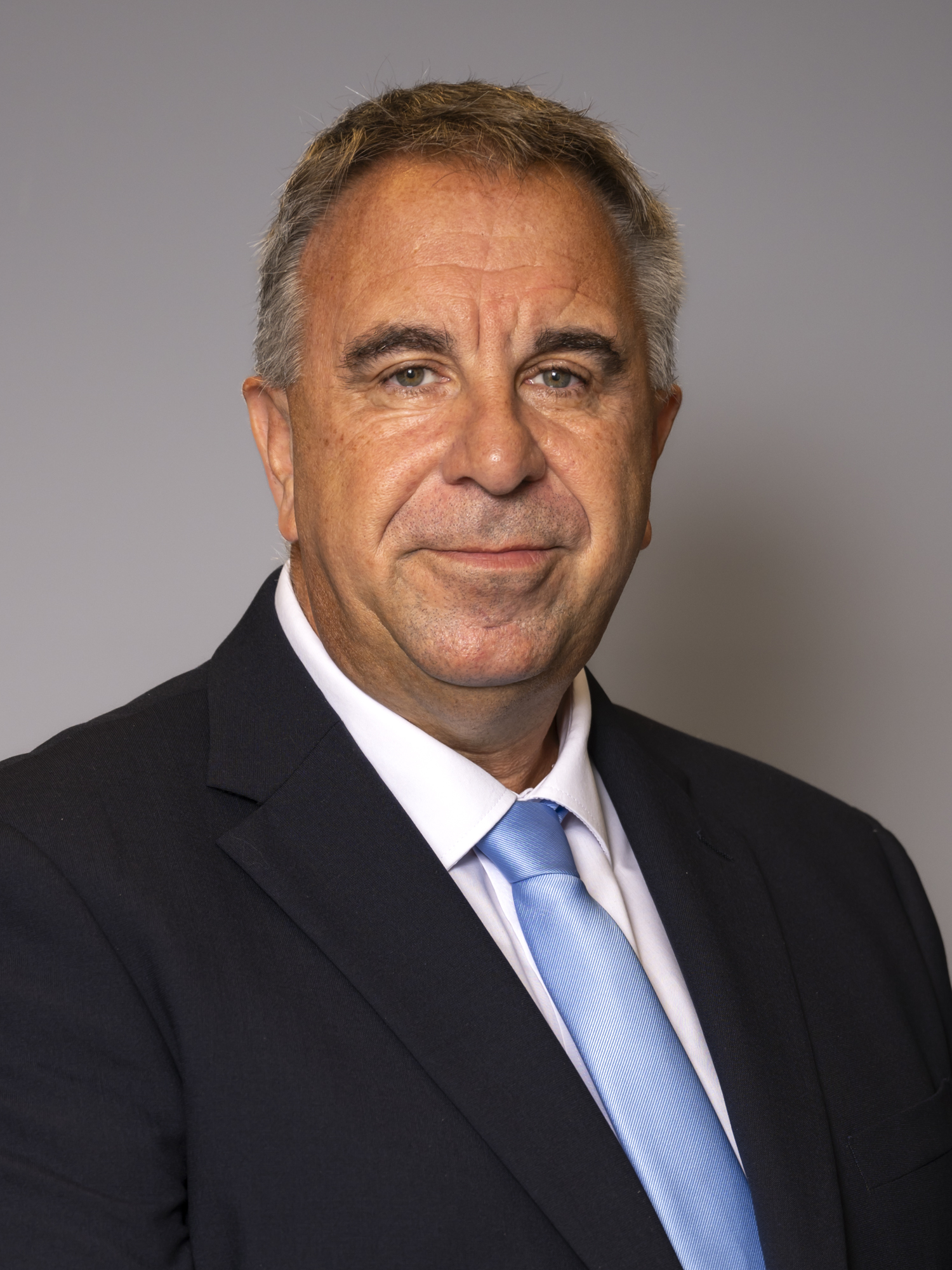

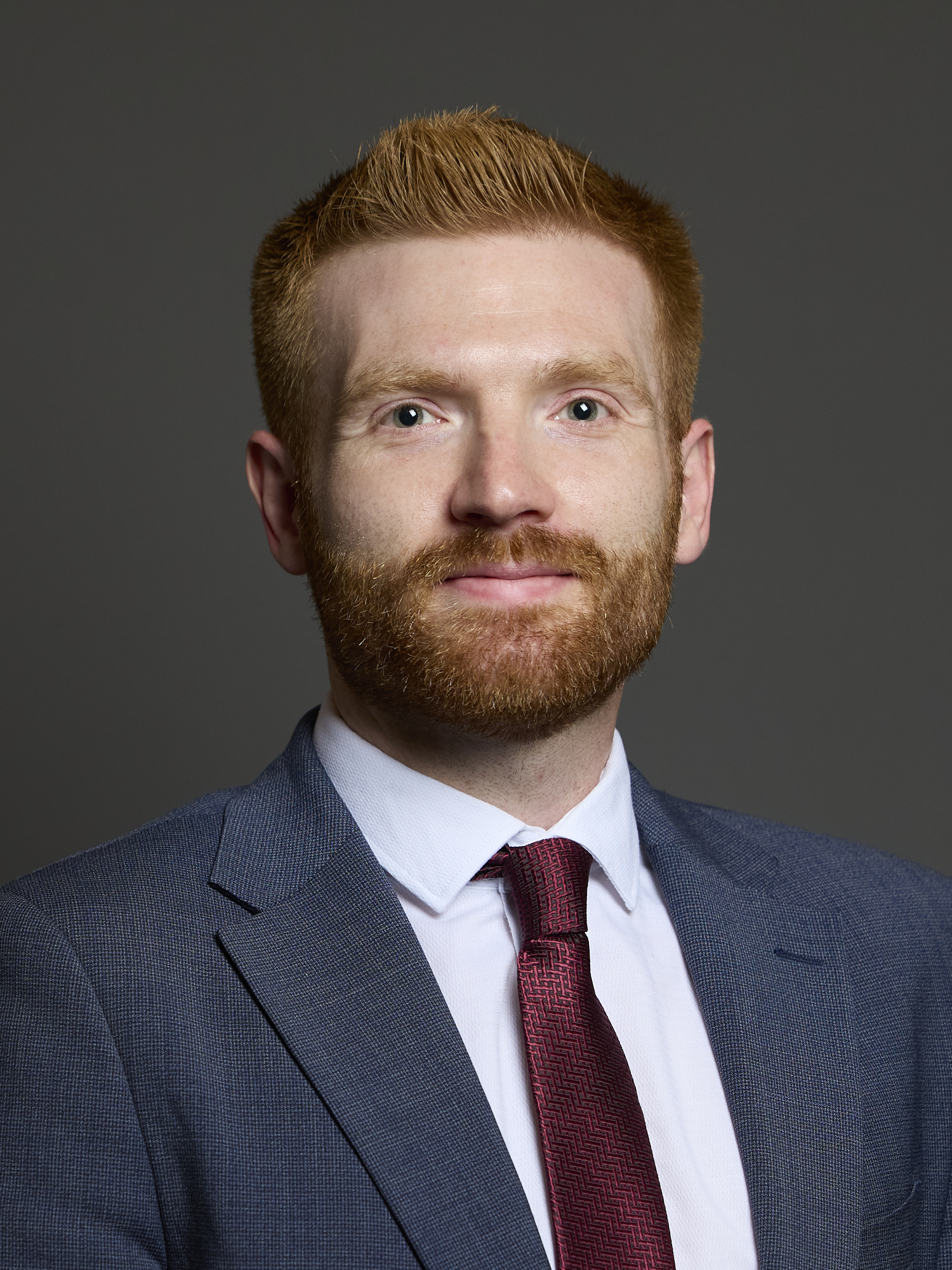
	First party	Second party
Candidate	Steve Tuckwell	Danny Beales
Party	Conservative	Labour
Popular vote	13,965	13,470
Percentage	45.2%	43.6%
Swing	▼7.4 pp	▲6.0 pp
MP before election
Boris Johnson
Conservative
Elected MP
Steve Tuckwell
Conservative

A by-election for the United Kingdom parliamentary constituency of Uxbridge and South Ruislip was held on 20 July 2023, following the resignation of former Prime Minister Boris Johnson as its member of Parliament (MP) on 12 June. The Conservative Party's candidate, Steve Tuckwell, narrowly held the seat with a reduced majority of 495 votes.

The result was considered an upset, as Labour had targeted the seat heavily; a large backlash against Johnson was expected in the constituency in the wake of the Partygate affair. Tuckwell attributed his victory to the unpopularity of London's Ultra Low Emission Zone scheme, installed by his parliamentary predecessor when he was mayor, and its proposed expansion into the Borough of Hillingdon.

== Background ==
Uxbridge and South Ruislip is a constituency in West London, part of the suburban sprawl of Greater London. Suburbs in the constituency include Uxbridge, South Ruislip, Eastcote, Hillingdon and Yiewsley.

Johnson was first elected as an MP in 2001 for the seat of Henley. After leaving Parliament to focus on being Mayor of London, an office to which he was elected in 2008, he was elected as the MP for Uxbridge and South Ruislip in 2015. In July 2019, he became leader of the Conservative Party and Prime Minister when he won the leadership election touched off by the resignation of Theresa May. He defended his office in December 2019 with a landslide victory at the general election, the largest Conservative victory since 1987. However, he stood down as Prime Minister and party leader in July 2022 following a series of scandals and by-election defeats which culminated in the mass resignation of much of his cabinet. In the subsequent leadership election, Liz Truss succeeded Johnson as Prime Minister, only to resign herself and be succeeded in October by Rishi Sunak.

Johnson announced his pending resignation from Parliament in response to an investigation by the Commons Privileges Committee that was launched into whether he had knowingly misled Parliament in comments about Partygate. He was highly critical of the report, which recommended a suspension from Parliament that would have been long enough to trigger a recall petition that, if successful, would have forced a by-election.

His resignation took effect on 12 June. The writs for the by-election were moved, in Parliament, by Chief Whip Simon Hart on 14 June. A by-election must take place between 21 and 27 working days from the issuing of the writs; thus the by-election for Uxbridge would have had to occur between 13 and 21 July. Hillingdon Council later confirmed that the by-election would take place on 20 July.

On the same day, the Selby and Ainsty and Somerton and Frome by-elections were held.

== Campaign ==
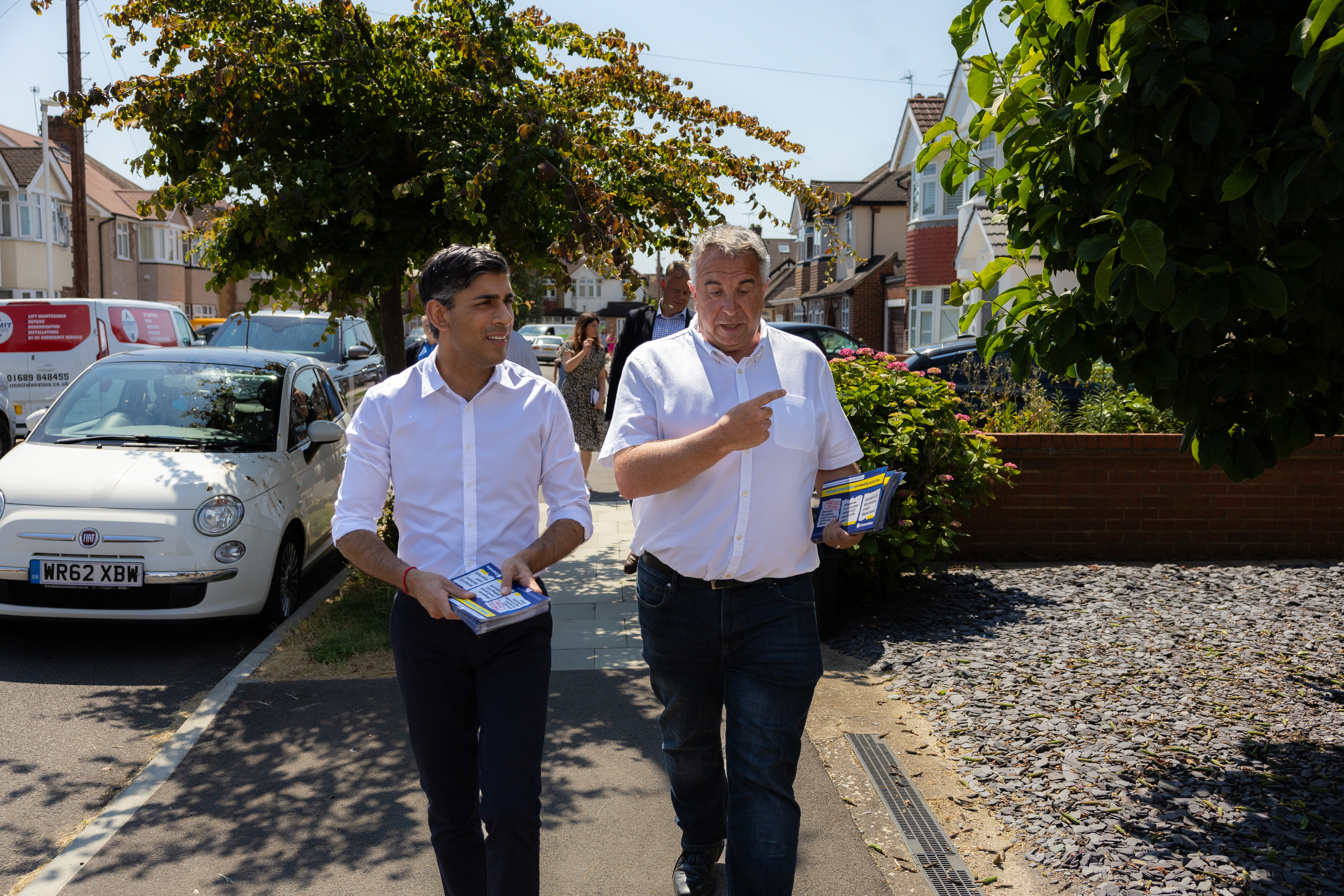
Conservative candidate Steve Tuckwell, right, campaigning for the by-election with Prime Minister Rishi Sunak

Labour began campaigning the day after Johnson's resignation was announced, with candidate Danny Beales joined by Shadow Work and Pensions Secretary Jonathan Ashworth and Labour's campaign co-ordinator Shabana Mahmood speaking to press with assembled supporters before canvassing. On 10 June, Sir Ed Davey, the leader of the Liberal Democrats, ruled out a Lib–Lab pact, as did Mahmood on 13 June.

At a hustings on 4 July, Beales said that it was "not the right time" to expand London's Ultra Low Emission Zone (ULEZ) into Hillingdon. Beales had previously supported the policy earlier in the campaign.

Weeks before the by-election, London Mayor Sadiq Khan reversed his decision to close Uxbridge police station, in a move described by political opponents as a "cynical" attempt to influence voters. The closure of the station was long opposed by the Conservative-run council and the previous MP. The London Conservatives referred the mayor to the watchdog, Greater London Assembly's monitoring officer. Both the Conservatives and the Labour candidate claimed credit for the reversal of the closure.

== Polling ==
One poll of the constituency was conducted in the days shortly before Boris Johnson's resignation by Lord Ashcroft Polls. The poll was criticised by a journalist in The New Statesman for sampling issues, and allegedly under-representing the young. National polls suggested Labour could win the seat, but that it would be a close race against the Conservatives. A poll by JL Partners after Johnson's resignation showed Labour in the lead, but within its margin of error.

Dates conducted	Pollster	Client	Sample size	Con	Lab	Lib Dems	Green	Reform	Reclaim	Others	Lead
20 Jul 2023	2023 by-election		—	45.2%	43.6%	1.7%	2.9%	–	2.3%	4.4%	1.6
26 Jun – 4 Jul 2023	JL Partners	38 Degrees	500	33%	41%	6%	4%	–	5%	10%	8
9 Jun 2023	Boris Johnson resigns as an MP triggering a by-election										
18 May – 2 Jun 2023	Lord Ashcroft Polls	N/A	936	50% (Note: Boris Johnson as the Conservative candidate)	33%	6%	5%	3%	–	4%	17
12 Dec 2019	2019 general election		–	52.6%	37.6%	6.3%	2.2%	–	–	1.3%	15.0

== Result ==
Seventeen candidates were standing in this by-election. The full list was announced on 23 June 2023.

Bar chart of the election result.

2023 Uxbridge and South Ruislip by-election
Party	Candidate	Votes	%	±%
Conservative	Steve Tuckwell	13,965	45.2	▼7.4
Labour	Danny Beales	13,470	43.6	▲6.0
Green	Sarah Green	893	2.9	▲0.7
Reclaim	Laurence Fox	714	2.3	New
Liberal Democrats	Blaise Baquiche	526	1.7	▼4.6
SDP	Steve Gardner	248	0.8	New
Independent	Kingsley Hamilton Anti-Ulez (Note: Names "Anti-Ulez" and "No-Ulez" indicate opposition to London's Ultra Low Emission Zone (ULEZ).)	208	0.7	New
Binface	Count Binface	190	0.6	▲0.5
Independent	No-Ulez Leo Phaure	186	0.6	New
Rejoin EU	Richard Hewison	105	0.3	New
Let London Live	Piers Corbyn	101	0.3	New
Independent	Cameron Bell	91	0.3	New
CPA	Enomfon Ntefon	78	0.3	New
UKIP	Rebecca Jane	61	0.2	▼0.4
Climate	Ed Gemmell	49	0.2	New
Monster Raving Loony	Howling Laud Hope	32	0.1	▼0.2
Independent	77 Joseph (Note: Otherwise known as Thomas Faithful Darwood, his ballot name alludes to Pharaoh's dream interpreted by Joseph in the Book of Genesis.)	8	0.0	New
Majority		495	1.6	▼13.4
Turnout		30,925	46.1	▼22.4
Rejected ballots		77		
Registered electors		67,067		
Conservative hold		Swing	▼6.7	

== Aftermath ==
Against expectations, Labour failed to take the seat, despite winning the Selby and Ainsty by-election on the same day with a much larger swing. Many interpreted the result as being about opposition to the ULEZ expansion. Much of Steve Tuckwell's campaign literature did not mention Boris Johnson at all, while barely mentioning either the Conservative Party or Rishi Sunak. Both Labour's leader, Keir Starmer, and deputy leader, Angela Rayner, blamed opposition to ULEZ, with Starmer suggesting the Labour London Mayor Sadiq Khan should rethink the policy. Khan defended the policy and Starmer soon sought to heal the rift. The defeated Labour candidate, Beales, also criticised the ULEZ policy. openDemocracy noted that despite strong negative feeling towards high-ranking politicians like Sunak, Starmer, and Khan, Tuckwell won more than half as many votes as Johnson had won in 2019.

The elected chair of Uxbridge and South Ruislip Constituency Labour Party resigned his position and left the party on the day after the election, praising former leader Jeremy Corbyn.

Tuckwell would later go on to lose the seat to Beales at the 2024 Election by an equally narrow margin of only 587 votes, serving just under a year as the constituency's MP.

== Previous result ==
General election 2019: Uxbridge and South Ruislip
Party	Candidate	Votes	%	±%
Conservative	Boris Johnson	25,351	52.6	▲1.8
Labour	Ali Milani	18,141	37.6	▼2.4
Liberal Democrats	Joanne Humphreys	3,026	6.3	▲2.4
Green	Mark Keir	1,090	2.2	▲0.3
UKIP	Geoffrey Courtenay	283	0.6	▼2.8
Monster Raving Loony	Lord Buckethead	125	0.3	New
Independent	Count Binface	69	0.1	New
Independent	Alfie Utting	44	0.1	New
(Note: This independent candidate left the optional Description field blank on the "Statement of Persons Nominated" (PDF). London Borough of Hillingdon. Archived from the original (PDF) on 15 November 2019.)	Yace "Interplanetary Time Lord" Yogenstein	23	0.0	New
Independent	Norma Burke	22	0.0	New
	Bobby Smith	8	0.0	New
	William Tobin	5	0.0	New
Majority		7,210	15.0	▲4.2
Turnout		48,187	68.5	▲1.7
Registered electors		70,369		
Conservative hold		Swing	▲2.1	
