= John J. Deely =

American-born statistician and educator

- Born: January 13, 1933; Cleveland, Ohio
- Died: January 17, 2025 (aged 92); West Lafayette, Indiana
- Citizenship: United States, New Zealand
- Education: Georgia Institute of Technology (BEE); Purdue University (MS, PhD)
- Known for: Bayesian statistics Decision theory
- Awards: Erskine Fellowship; David S. Moore Teaching Award; Fellow of the American Statistical Association; Purdue Statistics Outstanding Alumnus Award
- Scientific career
- Fields: Statistics
- Workplaces: National Advisory Committee for Aeronautics; Purdue University; Sandia National Laboratories; University of Canterbury
- Thesis: Multiple Decision Procedures from an Empirical Bayes Approach
- Doctoral advisor: Shanti S. Gupta

John Joseph Deely (January 13, 1933 – January 17, 2025) was an American-born statistician and educator who specialized in Bayesian statistics, specifically empirical Bayes methods and decision theory. He spent nearly three decades at the University of Canterbury in New Zealand, where he served as the chair of the statistics department, before returning to Purdue University for the latter portion of his career.

== Early life and education ==
Deely was born in Cleveland, Ohio, on January 13, 1933. He attended the Georgia Institute of Technology, earning a Bachelor of Electrical Engineering in 1955. Following his undergraduate studies, he worked as an aeronautical research scientist for the National Advisory Committee for Aeronautics (NACA), the predecessor to NASA.

Deely transitioned to study mathematics and statistics at Purdue University, where he completed an M.S. in mathematics in 1958 and a Ph.D. in statistics in 1965 under the supervision of Shanti S. Gupta. His doctoral thesis was titled Multiple Decision Procedures from an Empirical Bayes Approach.

== Academic career ==
After earning his doctorate, Deely worked as a staff member in the Statistical Research Division of Sandia National Laboratories in Albuquerque, New Mexico, from 1965 to 1968. In 1969, he relocated to New Zealand to join the faculty of the University of Canterbury as a senior lecturer. He was promoted to Reader in 1970 and became a full professor and chair of the department of statistics in 1972.

During his 28-year tenure at Canterbury, Deely is credited with significantly expanding the statistics program from a single course into a robust department with eight specialized courses and a strong postgraduate research culture. He supervised eight Ph.D. students and sixteen M.Sc. students during this period.

In 1997, due to the compulsory retirement laws in New Zealand at the time, Deely returned to the United States and joined Purdue University as a visiting professor. In 2000, he became a continuing lecturer, a role he held until his retirement at the age of 85. At Purdue, he became well known for teaching "Statistics and Society" (STAT 113), an introductory course for non-statistics majors, which he estimated to have taught to over 8,000 students.

== Contributions to statistics ==
Deely's research focused on the application of Bayesian methods to practical decision-making. His work often involved Bayesian hierarchical modeling and ranking and selection procedures.

He was an active member of the International Society for Bayesian Analysis (IBSA). He was noted within the community for his sense of humor, particularly for his "Deely Awards," which he presented at ISBA banquets to recognize humorous or unusual aspects of academic presentations.

== Personal life ==
Deely was a dual citizen of the United States and New Zealand. Deely was married to Elizabeth "Ann" Young for 35 years. He had six children from his first marriage to Anola. He died at his home in West Lafayette, Indiana on January 17, 2025, aged 92.
