= William Tobin (astronomer) =

British–New Zealand astronomer (1953–2022)

William John Tobin (28 July 1953 – 7 July 2022) was a British–New Zealand astronomer and academic. In the 2019 United Kingdom general election he stood as an independent candidate against Boris Johnson in the Uxbridge and South Ruislip constituency. As he had not resided in Britain for more than 15 years he was ineligible to vote but eligible to stand as a candidate. He focused his campaign on voting rights using the slogan "Don't vote for Tobin, let Tobin vote". He gained five votes.

== Early life and education ==
Tobin was born in Manchester and attended Stockport Grammar School. He was an undergraduate at Emmanuel College at the University of Cambridge graduating with a degree in natural sciences. He did post-graduate study in astronomy at the University of Wisconsin–Madison where he gained a PhD.

== Career ==
From 1979 to 1982 Tobin held a postdoctoral lectureship at the University of St Andrews in Scotland and from 1982 to 1987 a position at the Marseille Astrophysics Laboratory.

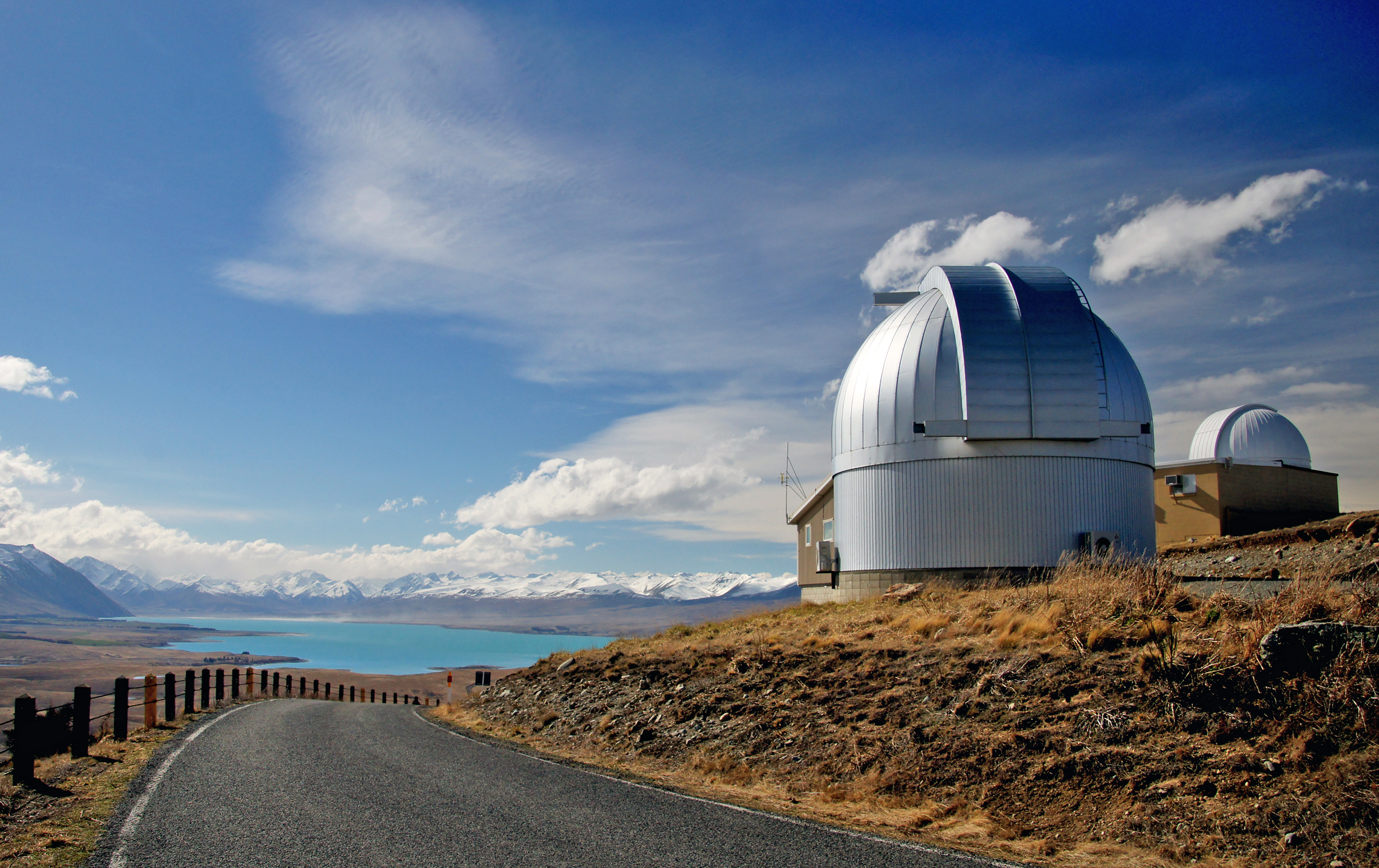
Mt John University Observatory in 2013

In 1987 Tobin became a lecturer in astronomy at the University of Canterbury in Christchurch, New Zealand. He held that position for 19 years until his retirement in 2006. During that time he was also the director of the Mt John University Observatory where he studied the star beta Pictoris. Other areas of research were spectra and photometry of blue stars and eclipsing binary stars in the Magellanic Clouds.

The history of astronomy was another field of Tobin's research. He studied the past Transit of Venus expeditions and wrote a biography of the French physicist Léon Foucault. Tobin's research on telescopes made by James Short found that Otago Museum's telescope was made in 1736 making it the oldest telescope in New Zealand.

Tobin retired to France but continued to work on astronomy projects. He returned to New Zealand in 2008 to take up a visiting Erskine Fellowship at Canterbury, in 2012 to attend the Starlight Conference in Tekapo and the 50th anniversary of the Mt John University Observatory in 2015.

== Political candidacy ==
Tobin stood as a candidate in the Uxbridge and South Ruislip constituency against Boris Johnson in the 2019 general election. Although he was a British citizen he had not been resident in Britain for more than 15 years making him ineligible to vote in the 2016 Brexit referendum or the general election. Electoral law allowed him to stand as a candidate. He considered that the British electoral system was unfair and used his election platform to highlight the system which disenfranchised expatriate Britons, particularly those living in Europe in the Brexit referendum, foreigners living in the United Kingdom and 16 and 17-year-olds. He also promoted electoral reform, particularly proportional representation having observed the change in New Zealand from a first-past-the-post system to mixed-member proportional representation. Tobin's campaign slogan was "Don't vote Tobin, let Tobin vote". Although he urged voters not to vote for him he received five votes, which was the lowest number of votes for any candidate in the election. He detailed his reasons for standing and his campaign in his book I'm standing!: the story of my candidacy, with advice for future candidates.

== Personal life ==
Tobin met his French wife Laurence at St Andrews and they had two daughters. He retired to live with his family in Brittany.

Tobin died on 6 July 2022.

== Legacy ==
Tobin's friend and author Marie Connolly dedicated her murder mystery set at Mt John to him.

== Selected works ==
=== Books ===
- Tobin, W; Evans, G.M. (1996). Stars in a cluster : Mt John University Observatory : tenth anniversary of the McLellan telescope : hundredth anniversary of the Townsend telescope : publications 1979-1995. Christchurch, N.Z.: Dept. of Physics & Astronomy, University of Canterbury. ISBN 0-473-03838-2. OCLC 35206638.
- Tobin, W. (2003). The life and science of Léon Foucault: the man who proved the earth rotates.
- Tobin, W. (2020). I'm standing!: the story of my candidacy, with advice for future candidates.

=== Articles ===
- Tobin W.; Kaufmann, J. P. (1984). "Analysis of the three high-velocity B stars HD 125924, 165955 and CPD - 72 deg 1184". Monthly Notices of the Royal Astronomical Society. 207: 369–392.
- Pritchard J. D.; Tobin W.; Clark M. (1995). "HV 982, a Magellanic Cloud eclipsing binary star system". Experimental Astronomy. 5: 43–48. Bibcode:1995ExA.....5...43P. ISSN 0922-6435. Wikidata Q68954930.
- Bayne, G.; Tobin, W.; Pritchard, J. D.; Bond, I.; Pollard, K. R.; Besier, S. C.; Noda, S.; Sumi, T.; Yanagisawa, T.; Sekiguchi, M.; Honda, M.; Muraki, Y.; Takeuti, M.; Hearnshaw, J. B.; Kilmartin, P. M. (2002). "The MOA catalogue of eclipsing binary stars in the Small Magellanic Cloud". Monthly Notices of the Royal Astronomical Society. 331 (3): 609–614. Bibcode:2002MNRAS.331..609B. doi:10.1046/j.1365-8711.2002.05010.x.
- Bayne, G. P.; Tobin, W.; Pritchard, J. D.; Pollard, K. R.; Albrow, M. D. (2004). "CCD photometry of variable stars in the Magellanic Clouds - VII. The eclipsing binaries MACHO*05:36:48.7−69:17:00 in the LMC, and MOA J005018.4−723855 and J005623.5−722123 in the SMC". Monthly Notices of the Royal Astronomical Society. 349 (3): 833–840. Bibcode:2004MNRAS.349..833B. doi:10.1111/j.1365-2966.2004.07535.x. S2CID 121406045.
- Tobin, W. (Dec 2016). 'Concerning heritage telescopes' Southern stars. 55 (4): 21–23.
- Tobin, W. (Jun 2017). 'The Louwman Collection of historic telescopes.' Southern stars. 56 (2): 6–9.
- Tobin, William; Barnes, Stuart I; Persson, Stephen; Pollard, Karen R (11 October 2019). "β Pictoris: observations of the Ca ii H&K absorptions in 1997 and 1998". Monthly Notices of the Royal Astronomical Society. 489 (1): 574–593. doi:10.1093/mnras/stz1983. ISSN 0035-8711.
- Tobin, W. (2021). 'Two photograph albums from the German transit of Venus expedition to the Auckland Islands in 1874.' Journal of Astronomical History and Heritage. 24 (3): 823–861.
- Teaching Antarctic astronomy
