= Marcia G. Ory =

American sociologist

- Born: 1950 (age 75–76)
- Spouse: Raymond J. Carroll
- Awards: Research Laureate in Health Behavior Research

Academic background
- Education: BA, sociology and psychology, University of Texas at Austin; MA, sociology and human development, Indiana University Bloomington; PhD, family studies and human development, 1976, Purdue University; MPH, chronic disease epidemiology and behavioral sciences, Johns Hopkins Bloomberg School of Public Health
- Thesis: The decision to parent or not: normative and structural components. (1976)

Academic work
- Institutions: Texas A&M School of Public Health; National Institutes of Health

Marcia G. Ory (born 1950) is an American gerontologist with a background in Social Sciences, Public Health and Aging. She is a Regents and Distinguished Professor in the Department of Environmental and Occupational Health at the Texas A&M School of Public Health. Ory also serves as the director of the Texas A&M Board of Regents Center for Population Health and Aging.

== Early life and education ==
Ory was born in 1950 to mother Esther Rose who she later described as a life-long inspiration. She completed her Bachelor of Arts degree in Sociology and Psychology from the University of Texas at Austin and her Master's degree in Sociology and Human Development from Indiana University Bloomington. Following this, she also earned her PhD in Family Studies and Human Development at Purdue University and her MPH from Johns Hopkins Bloomberg School of Public Health. Following formal schoolwork, Ory was honored by the School of Consumer and Family Sciences at Purdue University as a distinguished alumni and selected as a distinguished fellow at the Institute of Advanced Studies at La Trobe University.

== Career ==
Ory spent twenty years in public service with the National Institute on Aging, eventually serving as Chief of the Social Science Research on Aging. In 2001, Ory received the M. Powell Lawton Award for excellence in applied gerontology from the Gerontological Society of America. Following her federal service, she joined the Texas A&M School of Public Health where her focus shifted to "building a community, state and national infrastructure to widely disseminate evidence-based disease prevention programs for older persons 50 years and older."

Upon joining the faculty, Ory created the Active for Life program through a grant from the Robert Wood Johnson Foundation. The program aimed to increase physical activity in the elderly. This initiative was later recognized with the 2005 Archstone Foundation Award of Excellence. Ory was also recognized as a national and international scholar in 2003 by being listed in the Who's Who in America. The following year, she was appointed to the board of directors of the Center for Health Improvement to provide counsel on aging and health promotion topics.

As a result of her "exemplary contributions to their university or agency and to the people of Texas," Ory was the recipient of the 2007 Regents Professor Award from the Texas A&M University System Board of Regents. In the same year, she also received the 2007 Distinguished Mentorship in Gerontology Award from the Gerontological Society of America. A few years later, Ory was appointed the principal investigator of the Communities of Texas, Cancer-Activity-Research-Education-Support program and the Texas Cancer Coalition. She also received the Philip G. Weiler Award for Leadership in Aging and Public Health from the American Public Health Association and the Presidential Award for Excellence in Research.

By 2012, Ory served as first author or co-author on over 200 peer-reviewed publications and edited 10 books. She was awarded the Texas A&M Health Science Center Presidential Award for Research. With expertise in translating research on evidence-based programs for older adults to practice, she was awarded a $100,000 WellCare Health Plans, Inc. community grant to conduct outreach and engagement. In recognition of her research and scholarship, Ory became one of the first Distinguished Professor from the School of Rural Public Health in 2013. The following year, she was appointed the Associate Dean of Research at the Texas A&M Health Science Center School of Public Health. While serving in this role, she was also recognized for significant contributions from the APHA Aging and Public Health Section and the Academy of Health Behavior Research Laureate in Health Behavior Research.

By 2016, Ory helped transition the Texas A&M Program on Healthy Aging to an established Board of Regents Center for Population Health and Aging. In 2018, she was named the Associate Vice President for Strategic Partnerships and Initiatives at Texas A&M and helped spearhead the Healthy South Texas Initiative which was designed to reduce chronic and infectious diseases prevalent in low-resourced communities. This work led to recognition by the Association of Schools and Programs as a finalist for the 2019 Harrison C. Spencer Award for Outstanding Community Service and the 2019 Healthcare Leadership Council Redefining American Healthcare Award. In recognition of the growing opioid epidemic, Ory also helped establish and co-chair the Texas A&M Opioid Task Force. Along with co-director Joy Alonzo, she received recognition in 2020 as an outstanding interprofessional activity as well as for a teamwork Teaching Award.

During the COVID-19 pandemic, Ory was part of a six-member investigative team using data from Texas to help model the potential spread of COVID-19 and its potential impacts on the state's health care system, economy, and other sectors. The following year, she also partook in Texas A&M's national vaccine study. In April 2021, Ory received the Texas A&M Women's Faculty Network's Outstanding Mentoring Award and the Association of Former Students’ Distinguished Achievement Award in Research. In 2025, Ory was elected a Fellow of the American Association for the Advancement of Science.

== Personal life ==
Ory is married to statistician Raymond J. Carroll. Together, they established the $25,000 Raymond J. Carroll and Marcia G. Ory Graduate Fellowship in Statistics to benefit graduate students pursuing degrees in statistics at Texas A&M University.
