= Roger Lee Berger =

American statistician

- Born: August 21, 1951 (age 75); Kansas, U.S.
- Citizenship: American
- Occupations: statistician and professor
- Known for: Statistical Inference (with George Casella)
- Honors: ASA Fellow (1999); IMS Fellow (1991); Purdue Distinguished Alumnus (2003)

Academic background
- Education: University of Kansas (BA); Purdue University (MS, PhD)
- Thesis: Minimax, Admissible, and Gamma-Minimax Multiple Decision Rules (1977)
- Doctoral advisor: Shanti S. Gupta

Academic work
- Institutions: Florida State University; North Carolina State University; Arizona State University
- Doctoral students: 11

Roger Lee Berger is an American statistician and professor, co-author of Statistical Inference, first published in 1990 with collaborator George Casella.

== Early life and education ==
Roger Lee Berger was born August 21, 1951, in rural northwest Kansas. His early interest in mathematics ripened as he attended the University of Kansas, switching from physics to mathematics with emphasis on real analysis as an undergraduate. Graduating in 1973, he studied graduate statistics at Purdue University, earning a master's degree in 1975 and a doctorate in 1977. Building on the work of his advisor Shanti S. Gupta in subset selection, Berger wrote Minimax, Admissible, and Gamma-Minimax Multiple Decision Rules to complete his doctoral studies.

== University career and research ==
Berger's first professor appointment was at Florida State University in 1977. Later, he served at North Carolina State University and then Arizona State University, where he retired in 2017. Throughout his career, he supervised eleven students in statistics on topics ranging from theory, such as exact hypothesis testing, more powerful tests with linear and elliptical constraints, to applied biostatistics. In 2003, Purdue deemed Berger a Distinguished Alumnus.

== Friendship and collaboration with George Casella ==
Berger and George Casella met at Purdue and became fast friends, studying statistics together. In 1983 at the Eastern North American Region (ENAR) conference of the International Biometric Society, Casella asked Berger to co-author a new master's level introductory text to statistical inference, hoping to revise and improve Hogg and Craig's Introduction to Mathematical Statistics. This led to the publication of Statistical Inference in 1990. They continued to publish papers together, touching on topics such as generalized means and the reconciliation of Bayesian and frequentist testing, until Casella's death in 2012.

== Published works ==
- Casella, George, and Berger, Roger L. Statistical Inference, Duxbury Press, Belmont, CA, 1990.
