= Raymond J. Carroll =

American statistician (born 1949)

Raymond James Carroll
- Born: April 21, 1949 (age 77); Yokohama, Japan
- Education: Purdue University, (Ph.D. 1974); University of Texas at Austin, (B.A. 1971)
- Known for: Measurement error model Non-parametric statistics
- Spouse: Marcia G. Ory
- Awards: R. A. Fisher Lectureship (2002); COPSS Presidents' Award (1988)
- Scientific career
- Fields: Statistics
- Workplaces: Texas A&M University, since 1987 University of North Carolina,1974-1987
- Doctoral advisor: Shanti S. Gupta
- Doctoral students: Marie Davidian; Bo Li

Raymond James Carroll is an American statistician, and Distinguished Professor of statistics, nutrition and toxicology at Texas A&M University. He is a recipient of 1988 COPSS Presidents' Award and 2002 R. A. Fisher Lectureship. He has made fundamental contributions to measurement error model, nonparametric and semiparametric modeling.

== Biography ==
Carroll was born in Japan of military parents in 1949 and grew up in Washington, D.C., Germany and Wichita Falls, Texas. He graduated with a B.A. from University of Texas at Austin in 1971 and a Ph.D. in statistics from Purdue University in 1974 under the supervision of Shanti S. Gupta. He was on the faculty at the University of North Carolina at Chapel Hill from 1974 to 1987. He also had visiting positions at the University of Heidelberg, the University of Wisconsin, and the National Heart, Lung, and Blood Institute. Carroll has been a full professor of statistics, nutrition and toxicology at Texas A&M University since 1987, was head of the Department of Statistics from 1987 to 1990, and was named a Distinguished Professor in 1997. He has visiting appointments at the Australian National University, the Humboldt University in Berlin and the National Cancer Institute. He was the founding director of the Texas A&M Center for Statistical Bioinformatics, and has been the director of Texas A&M Institute for Applied Mathematics and Computational Science since 2010. He holds an honorary doctorate from the Institut de Statistique, Université Catholique de Louvain in Belgium.

Carroll's many areas of research include measurement error model, nonparametric and semiparametric regression, inverse problem, functional data analysis, case-control studies, among others. His work has a broad variety of application fields, including radiation and nutritional epidemiology, molecular biology, genomics and many others. He has authored or coauthored four books, over 300 refereed papers and has given over 300 invited talks. He has supervised and mentored more than 30 Ph.D. students and can claim more than 90 descendants in his mathematical genealogy.

He received the COPSS Presidents' Award in 1988 and gave the Fisher Lecture at the 2002 Joint Statistical Meetings. He was the first statistician given a Method to Extend Research in Time (MERIT) Award from the National Cancer Institute. He served as editor of Biometrics and Journal of the American Statistical Association (Theory and Methods), and chair of ASA's Section on Nonparametric Statistics. A conference on "Statistical Methods for Complex Data" was held on the Texas A&M University campus in honor of Carroll in 2009. In the same year, the Raymond J. Carroll Young Investigator Award was established to honor Carroll for his fundamental contributions in many areas of statistical methodology and practice. The award is given bi-annually on odd numbered years to a statistician who has made important contributions to the area of statistics, with the recipients being Samuel Kou and Marc A. Suchard, both are also COPSS Presidents' Award recipients. Ray Carroll was in the selection committee of COPSS Presidents' Award during that period.

== Personal life ==
Carroll is married to Texas A&M behavioral scientist Marcia G. Ory.

== Honors and awards ==
- 2013 Fellow, American Association for the Advancement of Science
- 2012 Honorary Doctorate, Institut de Statistique, Université Catholique de Louvain
- 2005 MERIT Award, National Cancer Institute
- 2003 Mitchell Prize, International Society for Bayesian Analysis
- 2003 JASA Applications Editor Invited Paper
- 2003 Jerome Sacks Award for Outstanding Cross-Disciplinary Research, National Institute of Statistical Sciences
- 2002 R. A. Fisher Lectureship, Committee of Presidents of Statistical Societies
- 1997 Snedecor Award, COPSS
- 1994 Distinguished Alumnus, College of Science, Purdue University
- 1994 Don Owen Award, ASA's San Antonio Chapter
- 1988 COPSS Presidents' Award
- 1984 Fellow, Institute of Mathematical Statistics
- 1982 Fellow, American Statistical Association

== Bibliography ==
- Carroll, Raymond; Ruppert, David (1988). Transformation and Weighting in Regression. London: Chapman and Hall. ISBN 978-0412014215.
- Carroll, Raymond; Ruppert, David; Stefanski, Leonard (1995). Measurement Error in Nonlinear Models. London: Chapman and Hall.
- Ruppert, David; Wand, Matthew; Carroll, Raymond (July 2003). Semiparametric Regression. Cambridge University Press. ISBN 9780521785167.
- Carroll, Raymond; Ruppert, David; Stefanski, Leonard; Crainiceanu, Ciprian (2006). Measurement Error in Nonlinear Models: A Modern Perspective (2 ed.). CRC Press. ISBN 9781584886334.
- Liang, Faming; Liu, Chuanhai; Carroll, Raymond (August 2010). Advanced Markov Chain Monte Carlo: Learning from Past Samples. Wiley. ISBN 9780470748268.
