= Bo Li (statistician) =

Chinese-American statistician

- Education: Shanghai Jiao Tong University; Texas A&M University
- Scientific career
- Workplaces: Purdue University; University of Illinois at Urbana-Champaign; Washington University in St. Louis
- Thesis: An analysis of Texas rainfall data and asymptotic properties of space-time covariance estimators (2006)
- Doctoral advisor: Raymond J. Carroll; Michael Sherman
- Website: sds.wustl.edu/people/bo-li/

Bo Li is a Chinese-American statistician whose research focuses on spatial statistics, spatio-temporal statistics, geostatistics, and environmental statistics, with applications in paleoclimatology, estimation of crop yields, and agriculture-related cancer risks. She is the Stanley A. Sawyer Professor in the Department of Statistics and Data Science at the Washington University in St. Louis.

== Education and career ==
Li studied naval architecture, ocean engineering, fluid mechanics, and industrial foreign trade at Shanghai Jiao Tong University in China, earning bachelor's and master's degrees there. She went to Texas A&M University for graduate study in statistics. She earned a second master's degree in 2004, and completed her Ph.D. in 2006 under the joint supervision of Raymond J. Carroll and Michael Sherman.

After completing her Ph.D., she was a postdoctoral researcher at the National Center for Atmospheric Research, and then from 2008 to 2013 an assistant professor of statistics at Purdue University. She moved to the University of Illinois Urbana-Champaign in 2013. She was named as a Data Science Founder Professorial Scholar in 2019, given the Marjorie Roberts Professorship in 2023,, and was the chair of the Department of Statistics from 2019-2024. In 2024, she moved to the newly founded Department of Statistics and Data Science at Washington University in St. Louis as the Stanley A. Sawyer Professor in Statistics and Data Science.

She is 2023 chair of the American Statistical Association Section on Statistics and Environment, and serves on the Advisory Committee on Environmental Research and Education of the National Science Foundation Office of Integrative Activities.

== Recognition ==
Li was named as a Fellow of the American Statistical Association in 2019. She was the 2020 recipient of the H.O. Hartley Award, given by the Texas A&M University to a former student for distinguished service to statistics. The American Statistical Association Section on Statistics and Environment gave her their Distinguished Achievement Award in 2022.
