= Lynn Eberly =

Professor of biostatistics

Lynn Elizabeth Eberly
- Education: Washington University in St. Louis; Cornell University (PhD)
- Scientific career
- Fields: Statistics
- Workplaces: University of Minnesota
- Thesis: Convergence of Interval Estimates From the Gibbs Sampler
- Doctoral advisor: George Casella

Lynn Elizabeth Eberly is an American professor of biostatistics in the University of Minnesota School of Public Health, whose research involves longitudinal studies, medical imaging, and other forms of correlated data.

== Early life ==
Eberly double-majored in mathematics and German language and literature at Washington University in St. Louis, graduating in 1991. She earned her M.S. and Ph.D. in statistics from Cornell University in 1997, under the supervision of George Casella.

== Career ==
After graduating from Cornell, she joined the University of Minnesota faculty the same year.

Eberly's statistical expertise includes methods for, and applications to, correlated data, "including longitudinal cohort studies and medical imaging data." She has historically collaborated on research in longitudinal epidemiological studies, but has migrated to include human and animal studies using structural and functional imaging (NMR spectroscopy, MRI, fMRI, etc.). She has worked in other medical arenas to include of cancer, cardiovascular disease, geriatric pharmacoepidemiology, endocrinology, environmental health and ecology/wildlife biology.

With professor Chap T. Le, she is co-author of the textbook Introductory Biostatistics (2nd ed., Wiley, 2016).

In 2014, she was elected as a Fellow of the American Statistical Association "for excellence in statistical methodology related to correlated and medical imaging data; for broad impact in collaborative research and statistical consultation; for leadership in biostatistical core grant and data coordinating center activities; for excellence and innovation in teaching; and for diligence in service to the ASA, her university, and the profession."
