= Mark Benden =

American ergonomist

- Born: United States

Academic background
- Education: BS, 1990, BioEngineering, MSc, 1992, Industrial Engineering, PhD, 2006, Interdisciplinary Engineering, Texas A&M University College of Engineering
- Thesis: The obese office worker seating problem (2006)

Academic work
- Institutions: Texas A&M University School of Public Health

Mark E. Benden is an American ergonomist. He is a full professor and director of the Center for Worker Health (formerly known as the Ergonomics Center) at the Texas A&M University School of Public Health. In 2023, Benden was elected to the National Academy of Inventors for his innovations.

== Early life and education ==
Benden was raised in Maryland to a machinist father who inspired him to attend Texas A&M University for his Bachelor of Science in bioengineering with a focus on medicine. However, in his senior year, he shifted his career path after taking an elective course on ergonomics by Jerome Congleton. Subsequently, he pursued a Master's degree in industrial engineering. While completing his degrees, Benden was a member of the Texas A&M University Corps of Cadets and in the United States Army Reserve. Benden eventually became an officer of the United States Army Reserve and became an engineer for Johnson & Johnson's medical products division (Ethicon) upon the completion of his Master's degree.

== Career ==
After working for six years at Johnson & Johnson, Benden became the Director of Engineering and Development at Neutral Posture Inc. While at Neutral Posture, he completed his PhD in interdisciplinary engineering from Texas A&M and secured a patent for his armrest design. After 10 years with Johnson & Johnson, Benden joined the faculty at the Texas A&M School of Public Health in 2008. During his first year, Benden and colleague Eric Wilke began developing a new ambulance that could navigate crowded and narrow streets in rural areas following a medical trip by Wilke to Uganda. This led to the creation of the AmbiCycle, an ambulance that was nine feet long and used three wheels. At the same time, Benden began conducting studies to test the impact standing desks had on technology induced inactivity. This led to the creation of Stand2Learn, a start-up company tasked with developing the classroom version of standing desks for elementary, middle, and high school students that Benden had designed. From 2011 to 2013, Benden oversaw a study in three Texas elementary schools which found that standing desks had a larger positive impact on childhood obesity than regular standard desks over two years. In 2013, Benden was also promoted to the rank of associate professor with tenure. In 2015 he became the Chair of the Environmental and Occupational Health Department.

By May 2018, Benden's standing desks were used by 100,000 children inside schools in all 50 states and 13 other nations. As a result, he received the 2018 Innovation Award from Texas A&M Technology Commercialization. Stand2Learn was shortly thereafter acquired by Varidesk, a manufacturer of active office products. In 2019, Benden was named an inaugural senior member of the National Academy of Inventors as a result of his inventions to fight childhood obesity and improve classroom ergonomics. In 2023, Benden was elected a Fellow of the National Academy of Inventors.

== Personal life ==
Benden and his wife Teresa have three sons together.

== Selected publications ==
- Could You Stand to Lose? Weight Loss Secrets for Office Workers (2006, 2008)
