= Shawn Gibbs =

American industrial hygienist

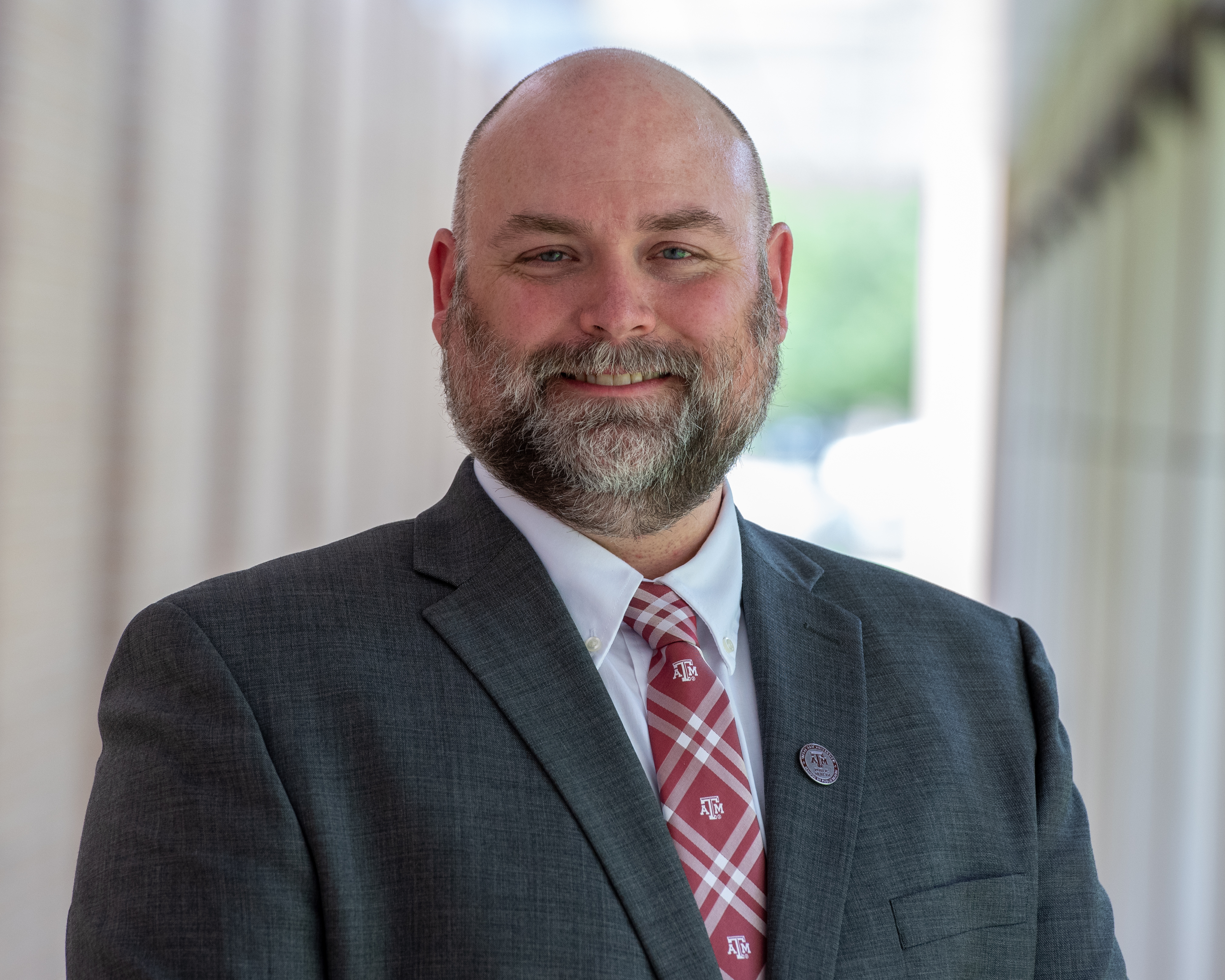

Academic background
- Education: BSc, biology, Ohio State University; MSc, environmental engineering, PhD, environmental science, 2002, University of Cincinnati; MBA, Agribusiness, University of Nebraska–Lincoln
- Thesis: Cross-connections in potable water distribution systems : the fate of wastewater microbes introduced into a distribution system simulator (2002)

Academic work
- Institutions: Texas A&M University School of Public Health; Indiana University; University of Nebraska Medical Center; University of Texas Health Science Center at Houston

Shawn G. Gibbs is an American industrial hygienist. As of 2020, he is the dean of the Texas A&M University School of Public Health. His research focuses on the disruption of high consequence infectious diseases.

== Early life and education ==
Gibbs graduated from Ohio State University with a Bachelor of Science degree in biology, becoming the first person in his family to graduate from college. Following this, he accepted a contractor position with the United States Environmental Protection Agency which led him to pursuing a master's degree and PhD at the University of Cincinnati.

== Career ==
Gibbs began his academic career at the University of Texas Health Science Center at Houston and was the co-director of two Cores of the Hispanic Health Disparities Research Center. While there, he was awarded a 2006 Fulbright Scholarship to conduct research in the Air Pollution Department of the National Research Center in Giza. Following this, Gibbs accepted an associate professor position in the department of environmental, agricultural, and occupational health at the University of Nebraska Medical Center (UNMC) in 2008.

During his tenure at UMNC, Gibbs was promoted to Full Professor and became a certified industrial hygienist with the American Board of Industrial Hygiene and served as the Associate Dean for Student Affairs in their College of Public Health. He also completed an MBA in Agribusiness from the institution. In 2013, Gibbs and UNMC were selected to host the Public Health cohort of Fulbright Visiting Scholars from Libya. Gibbs was later promoted to Director of Research in the Nebraska Biocontainment Unit (NBU) which was instrumental in the United States' response to the Western African Ebola virus epidemic. In this role, he helped determine policies, procedures, and best practices to treat patients with the disease. Gibbs and the NBU actively treated three patients with Ebola virus diseases. As recognition for their efforts in the USA, Gibbs and members of the NBU team received the American Industrial Hygiene’s Edward J. Baier Technical Achievement Award.

Gibbs eventually left UMNC to become a Professor and Executive Associate Dean of Indiana University's School of Public Health. While in this role, Gibbs continued to host Fulbright Scholar events and led a Fulbright Junior Faculty Development program for Egyptian scholars. He also served for four years on the Board of Scientific Counselors Homeland Security Subcommittee and collaborated with the United States Airforce on Aeromedical Evacuation of patients with high consequence infectious diseases.

In March 2020, Gibbs was announced as the dean of the Texas A&M School of Public Health effective May 1, 2020. As a result of his public health and infectious disease expertise, Gibbs was invited to join the Southeastern Conference Medical Task Force for COVID-19 where he developed a multi-pronged approach aimed at reducing the spread of the virus on campus. By December 2020, Gibbs was appointed to lead the Texas A&M's COVID-19 response. As the pandemic continued, Gibbs also sat on the SEC's Return to Activity and Medical Guidance Task Force which was recognized with the Michael L. Slive Distinguished Service Award for their leadership and significant impact to the betterment of the mission of the conference. Independently, Gibbs received the 2022 Industrial Hygiene Impact Award from the Board for Global Environmental, Health and Safety Credentialing and was appointed to sit on their Board of Directors.

== Personal life ==
Gibbs is married.
