= George Casella =

American statistician

George C. Casella
- Born: January 22, 1951; The Bronx, New York City
- Died: June 17, 2012 (aged 61); Gainesville, Florida
- Education: Fordham University; Purdue University
- Scientific career
- Fields: Statistics
- Institutions: Rutgers University; Cornell University; University of Florida
- Thesis: Minimax Ridge Regression Estimation (1977)
- Doctoral advisor: Leon Jay Gleser
- Doctoral students: Lynn Eberly

George Casella (January 22, 1951 – June 17, 2012) was a Distinguished Professor in the Department of Statistics at the University of Florida. He died from multiple myeloma.

== Academic career ==
Casella completed his undergraduate education at Fordham University and graduate education at Purdue University. He served on the faculty of Rutgers University, Cornell University, and the University of Florida. His contributions focused on the area of statistics including Monte Carlo methods, model selection, and genomic analysis. He was particularly active in Bayesian and empirical Bayes methods, with works connecting with the Stein phenomenon, on assessing and accelerating the convergence of Markov chain Monte Carlo methods, as in his Rao–Blackwellization technique, and recasting lasso as Bayesian posterior mode estimation with independent Laplace priors.

== Awards ==
Casella was named as a Fellow of the American Statistical Association and the Institute of Mathematical Statistics in 1988, and he was made an Elected Fellow of the International Statistical Institute in 1989. In 2009, he was made a Foreign Member of the Spanish Royal Academy of Sciences.

== Selected bibliography ==
- Casella, George; Lehmann, E. L. (1998). Theory of point estimation. Berlin: Springer. ISBN 0-387-98502-6.
- Lee Berger, Roger; Casella, George (2002). Statistical inference. Stamford, Connecticut: Thomson Learning. ISBN 0-534-24312-6.
- Casella, George; Robert, Christian P. (2004). Monte Carlo statistical methods. Berlin: Springer. ISBN 0-387-21239-6.
- McCulloch, Charles E.; Shayle R. Searle; Casella, George (2006). Variance components. New York: Wiley-Interscience. ISBN 0-470-00959-4.
- Casella, George (2008). Statistical design. Berlin: Springer. ISBN 978-0-387-75965-4.
- Casella, George; Robert, Christian P. (2009). Introducing Monte Carlo Methods with R (Use R). Berlin: Springer. ISBN 978-1-4419-1575-7.
- Casella, George; Wu, Rongling; Changxing Ma (2010). Statistical Genetics of Quantitative Traits: Linkage, Maps and QTL (Statistics for Biology and Health). Berlin: Springer. ISBN 978-1-4419-1912-0.
