= Texas A&M University School of Public Health =

Public health school in College Station, Texas

Coordinates: 30.609757°N 96.354196°W

- Former names: Texas A&M Health Science Center School of Rural Public Health
- Type: Public
- Established: 1998; 28 years ago
- Parent institution: Texas A&M University
- Dean: Shawn Gibbs
- Academic staff: 91
- Undergraduates: 2,451 majors; 451 minors
- Postgraduates: 306
- Doctoral students: 85
- Location: College Station, Texas & McAllen, Texas
- Website: public-health.tamu.edu

Texas A&M University School of Public Health, formerly known as the Texas A&M Health Science Center School of Rural Public Health, is the public health school of Texas A&M University and a component of Texas A&M Health. It offers research, service and degree programs and is the 5th largest School of Public Health in the nation by student count. It was founded in 1998, offering degrees at both the undergraduate and graduate level, and is accredited by CEPH and CAHME. The school has four departments: Environmental and Occupational Health; Epidemiology & Biostatistics; Health Policy and Management; and Health Behavior. They also have six Texas A&M University System Board of Regents approved centers: The Ergonomics Center; Southwest Rural Health Research Center; Center for Community Health and Aging; USA Center for Rural Public Health Preparedness; Center for Health & Nature; Center for Health Equity and Evaluation Research.

In 2025, Texas A&M University School of Public Health is ranked 27th in the Best Public Health Schools category and 28th for Healthcare Management Programs according to U.S. News & World Report.

== History ==
The Texas A&M University School of Public Health was founded in 1998. The school has four departments: Environmental and Occupational Health; Epidemiology & Biostatistics; Health Policy and Management; and Health Behavior. They also have six Texas A&M University System Board of Regents approved centers: The Ergonomics Center; Southwest Rural Health Research Center; Center for Community Health and Aging; USA Center for Rural Public Health Preparedness; Center for Health & Nature; Center for Health Equity and Evaluation Research. In 2023, the Southwest Rural Health Research Center developed Rural Healthy People 2030, a companion piece to the United States Department of Health and Human Services Healthy People 2030. This is the third edition for the center (Rural Healthy People 2010, 2020) and is developed once a decade to identify the most important priorities for rural America and best practices in addressing them.

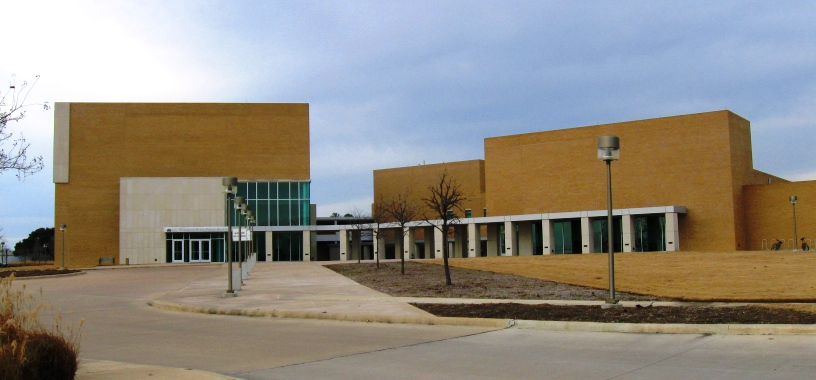
School of Public Health Building

In 2013, Texas A&M University School of Public Health was selected by the U.S. Army Medical Department Center and School to provide training to military personnel in the Department of Preventive Health Services Principles in the Army Preventive Medicine program, a collaborative graduate program at Ft. Sam Houston in San Antonio. Beginning in 2004, Texas A&M University School of Public Health began offering HAZWOPER training to prepare students to work in environmentally hazardous situations. Since 2010, the school has been awarded the National Institute for Occupational Safety and Health (NIOSH) Training Grant from the Centers for Disease Control and Prevention, which offers students interested in Occupational Health and Safety the opportunity to apply for full-tuition support, a monthly stipend, and funds for travel to conferences and training. Since 2018, the school has offered a five-week study abroad program to help students learn more about efficient emergency preparedness efforts in Europe.

During the COVID-19 pandemic, two Texas A&M University School of Public Health professors established the Mobile Responding to Air Pollution in Disasters (mRAPiD) Core Lab to help better develop lab-based and field-based rapid response to disasters across Texas. In 2023, SPH partnered with a faith-based nonprofit to study water contamination in ‘colonias' at Texas' Southwest border with Mexico.

In 2024, Texas A&M University School of Public Health received a National Academy of Sciences grant to improve health outcomes associated with the environment and climate.

== Rankings ==
The school has consistently ranked in the top 40 among all public health schools in the United States by U.S. News and World Report. In 2015, it ranked 33 among the best graduate health care management programs. In 2025, U.S. News and World Report ranked Texas A&M University School of Public Health 27th in the Best Public Health Schools category and 28th for Healthcare Management Programs.

== Notable faculty ==
- Marcia G. Ory
- Shawn Gibbs
- Jay Maddock
- Mark Benden
