= Jay Maddock =

American public health expert

- Born: Rhode Island, USA

Academic background
- Education: BA, Psychology and Sociology, 1995, Syracuse University; MA, Psychology, 1997, PhD, Psychology, 1999, University of Rhode Island
- Thesis: Statistical Power and Effect Size in the Field of Health Psychology (1999)

Jason E. Maddock is an American public health expert. He is a Regents Professor at Texas A&M University and Director of the Center for Health and Nature at Houston Methodist Hospital. He also serves as the chair of the Nature and Health Alliance. Since 2020, Maddock has served as Editor-in-chief of the Journal of Healthy Eating and Active Living.

== Early life and education ==
Maddock was raised in Rhode Island, USA, as the oldest of four children. He completed his Bachelor of Arts degree in both psychology and sociology in 1995 before returning to Rhode Island for his Master's degree and PhD. Upon completing his PhD, Maddock moved to Hawaii for his post-doctoral degree at the Cancer Research Center of Hawaii.

== Career ==
=== Hawaii ===
Following his post-doctoral appointment, Maddock began working in the University of Hawaiʻi at Mānoa's Department of Public Health Studies. In 2000, Maddock took over the Healthy Hawaii Initiative, a statewide Department of Health program to reduce chronic disease. One of first studies in this role involved changing the bell times of local elementary schools to place recess before lunch. The results of this study showed there were fewer disciplinary issues with the bell changes and, as a result, the changes were expected to be implemented in other schools. While retaining his role as Evaluating Director of the Healthy Hawaii Initiative, Maddock also worked as an associate professor of public health sciences and epidemiology at the University of Hawaiʻi at Mānoa. By 2006, he helped spearhead two new degrees at the institution; a dual MPH/MS in social and behavioral sciences and a PhD in health promotion and health education. He was also appointed Director of the Office of Public Health Studies at the University of Hawaiʻi at Mānoa.

Two years later, Maddock became a principal investigator of the Get Fit Kaua'i coalition as part of the Nutrition and Physical Activity Coalition of Kauaʻi County, Hawaii. The coalition aimed to develop policy and environmental change in the county to improve physical health. In 2011, Maddock was recognized as a Fellow of the American Academy of Health Behavior for his "experience in system, environmental and policy research to improve population-level risk factors for chronic disease including physical inactivity, tobacco use and poor nutrition in multiethnic, disparate communities." As Director of the Office of Public Health Studies, Maddock signed the office as a founding member of the newly established Association of Schools and Programs of Public Health. In 2014, Maddock stepped down as director and department chair of the Office of Public Health Studies.

=== Texas ===
In February 2015, Maddock left Hawaii to become the dean of the Texas A&M Health Science Center School of Public Health. Shortly after being approved as Dean, Maddock was elected President of the American Academy of Health Behavior. In June 2015, Maddock was selected to serve as a member of the Texas Department of State Health Services Public Health Funding and Policy Committee. The following year, Maddock helped Texas A&M University School of Public Health establish partnerships with four universities in China, South Korea, and Austria. In August 2016, Maddock was appointed chair of the National Public Health Preparedness Advisory Group.

In August 2019, Maddock was named co-director of the Center for Health and Nature at Houston Methodist Hospital. After participating in the 2020 Active Living Conference, Maddock and other professionals in the public health field created the Journal of Healthy Eating and Active Living. Since its establishment, Maddock has served as the journal's Editor-in-chief. In November 2022, Maddock was appointed a Regents Professor as a result of his "contributions to the university and the people of Texas." The following month, he was appointed to serve as the chair of the Nature and Health Alliance, which had started at Texas A&M in December 2022.
