= South Ruislip =

Coordinates: 51.55737°N 0.39304°W

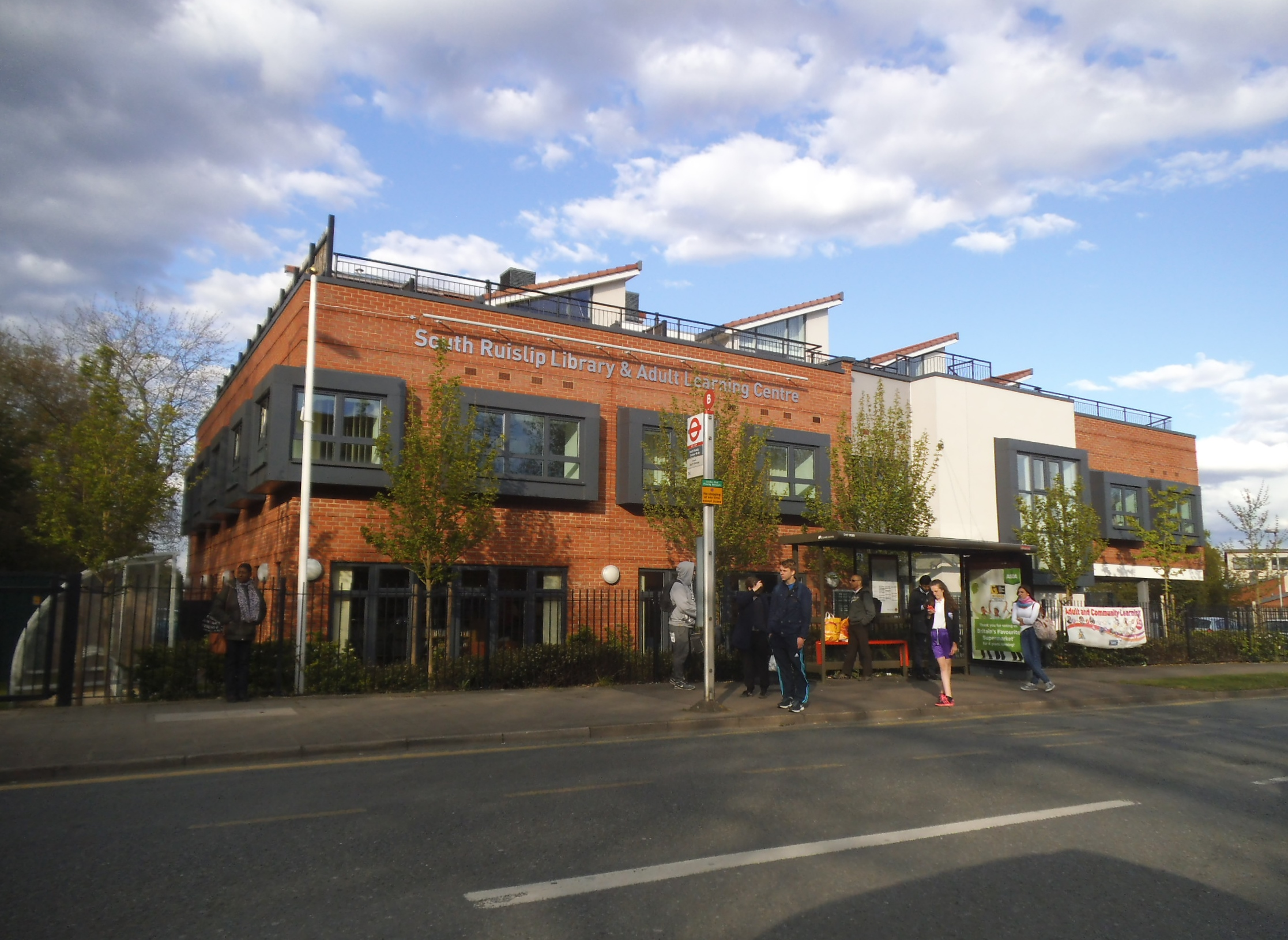
- South Ruislip library

- Location within Greater London
- OS grid reference: TQ115855
- London borough: Hillingdon
- Ceremonial county: Greater London
- Region: London
- Country: England
- Sovereign state: United Kingdom
- Post town: RUISLIP
- Postcode district: HA4
- Dialling code: 020
- Police: Metropolitan
- Fire: London
- Ambulance: London
- UK Parliament: Uxbridge and South Ruislip
- London Assembly: Ealing and Hillingdon

South Ruislip is an area of the London Borough of Hillingdon.

At the 2021 census, the population of the South Ruislip ward was 16,838.

== Education ==
Schools in South Ruislip include Bourne Primary, Deanesfield, Field End, St Swithun Wells and Queensmead.

== Sports ==
McGovern Park is located on West End Road and is the headquarters of London GAA. It is the primary venue for playing hurling and Gaelic football in Britain.

== Transport ==
South Ruislip station is served by the Central line of the London Underground. Chiltern Railways serve hourly, with trains to London Marylebone and High Wycombe. Although no bus route directly serves the station, London Buses route E7 serves one end of nearby Station Approach and route 114 serves the other.

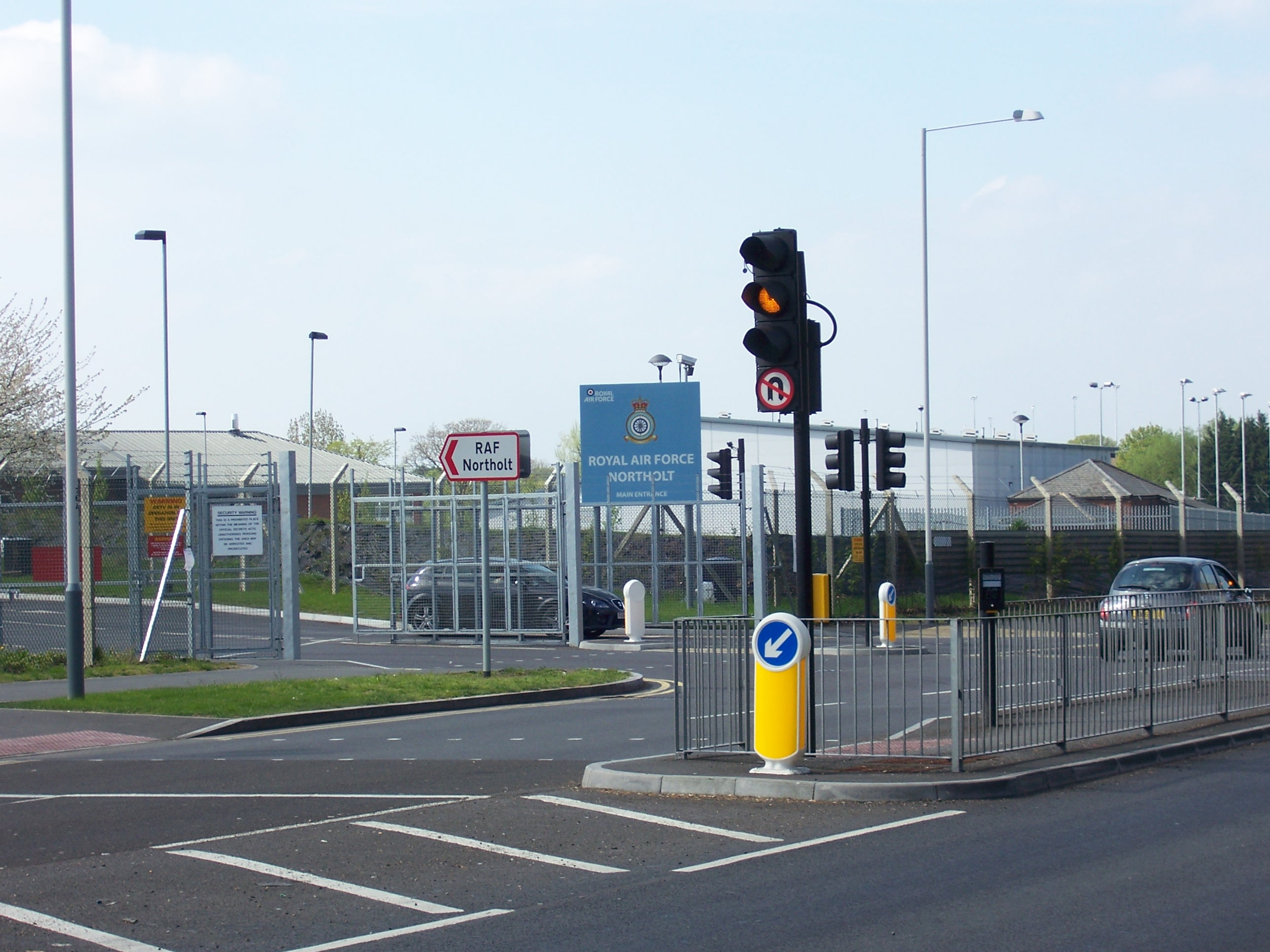
Entrance to RAF Northolt in South Ruislip

The Royal Air Force station, RAF Northolt, is situated in South Ruislip near the A40 and the tube station. Most early RAF airfields were named after the nearest railway station; in this case Northolt Junction, the original name of South Ruislip station.

== Demography ==
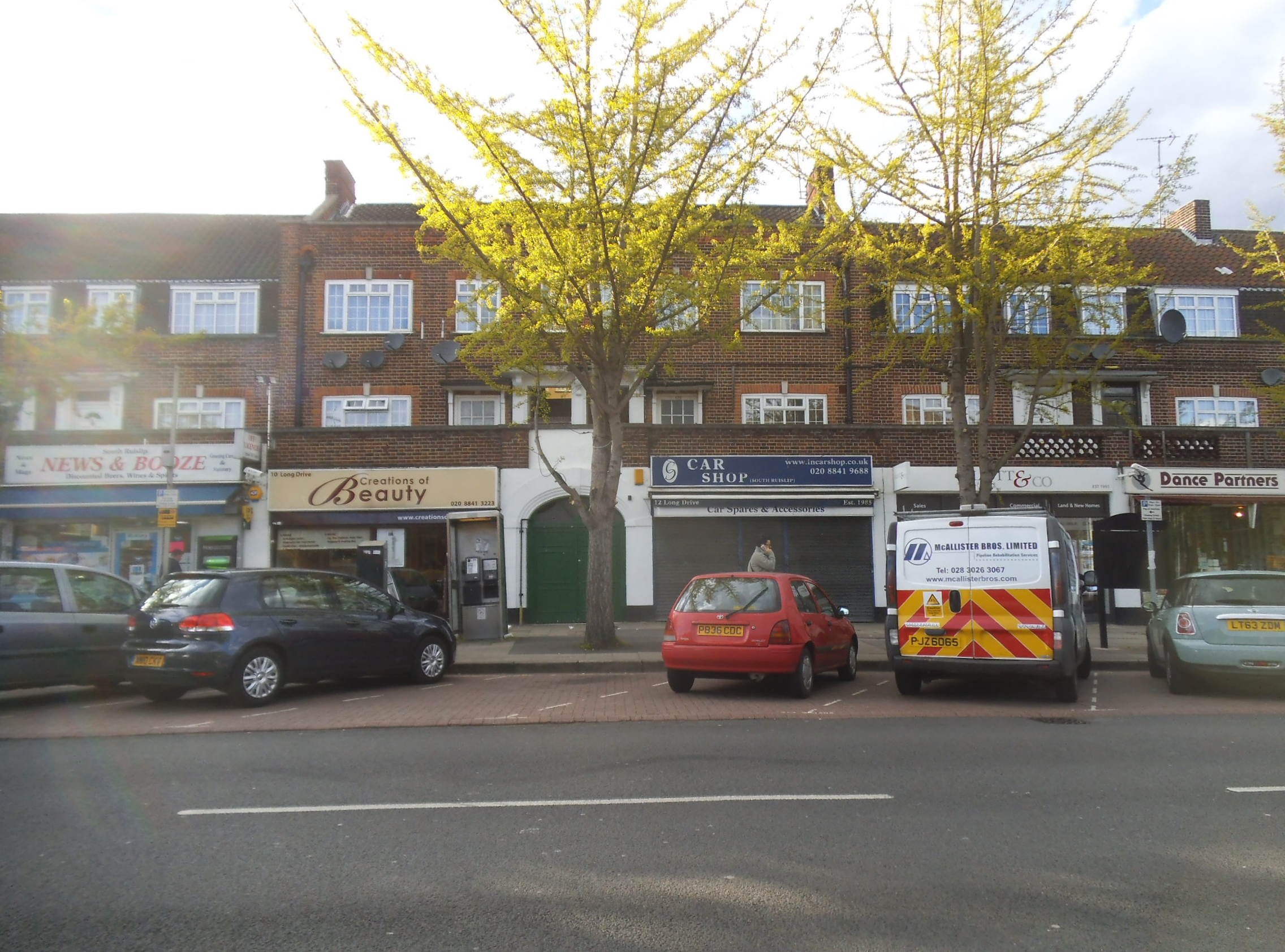
Shops in Long Drive

The population, according to the 2001 UK census, was 10,823. By 2008, this had reached 11,116.

In the 2011 UK census, the racial makeup of South Ruislip was: 73% White, 16% Asian, 5% Black. 75.8% of the working age population was economically active. 38% of residents lived in semi-detached houses; 28% in terraced houses; 27% in flats/maisonettes/apartments; and 8% in detached houses. 69.4% of households owned their homes, 19% were privately rented, 10.1% were socially rented.

== Landmarks ==
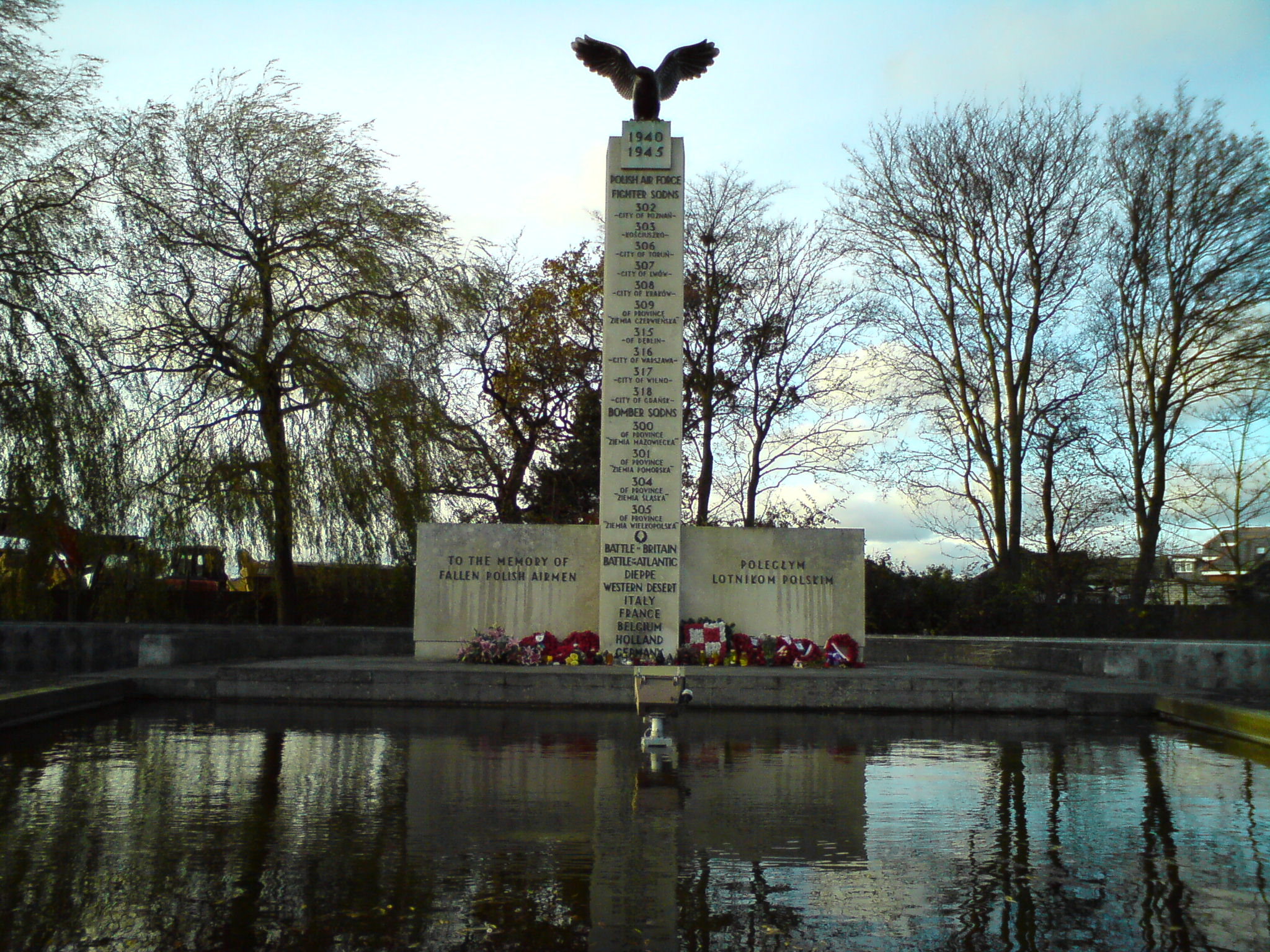
Polish War Memorial in South Ruislip

Polish fighter pilots during the Battle of Britain were based at RAF Northolt, and the Polish War Memorial was built later after the conflict. The memorial stands next to the A40 adjacent to the airfield, and is dedicated to the memory of the Polish airmen who fought with the Royal Air Force during the Second World War.

A damaged Vickers Wellington, attempting to land at RAF Northolt, crashed in Station Approach in October 1942. The resulting fire caused the remaining ammunition on board to detonate, and 21 people were killed.

In the 1950s and 1960s RAF South Ruislip supported by RAF West Ruislip was Headquarters, 7th Air Division of the Strategic Air Command (SAC), supporting SAC operations in the UK until 1958 when the 7th Air Division relocated to RAF High Wycombe, and the station became Headquarters, 3d Air Force and transferred to United States Air Forces, Europe. In 1972 HQ, 3d Air Force relocated to RAF Mildenhall and the buildings remained empty until 1995 when they were demolished.

In 2012, the BBC announced it would be moving the Digital Media Services branch of BBC Studios and Post Production from BBC Television Centre to the Odyssey Business Park opposite RAF Northolt between February and March 2013.

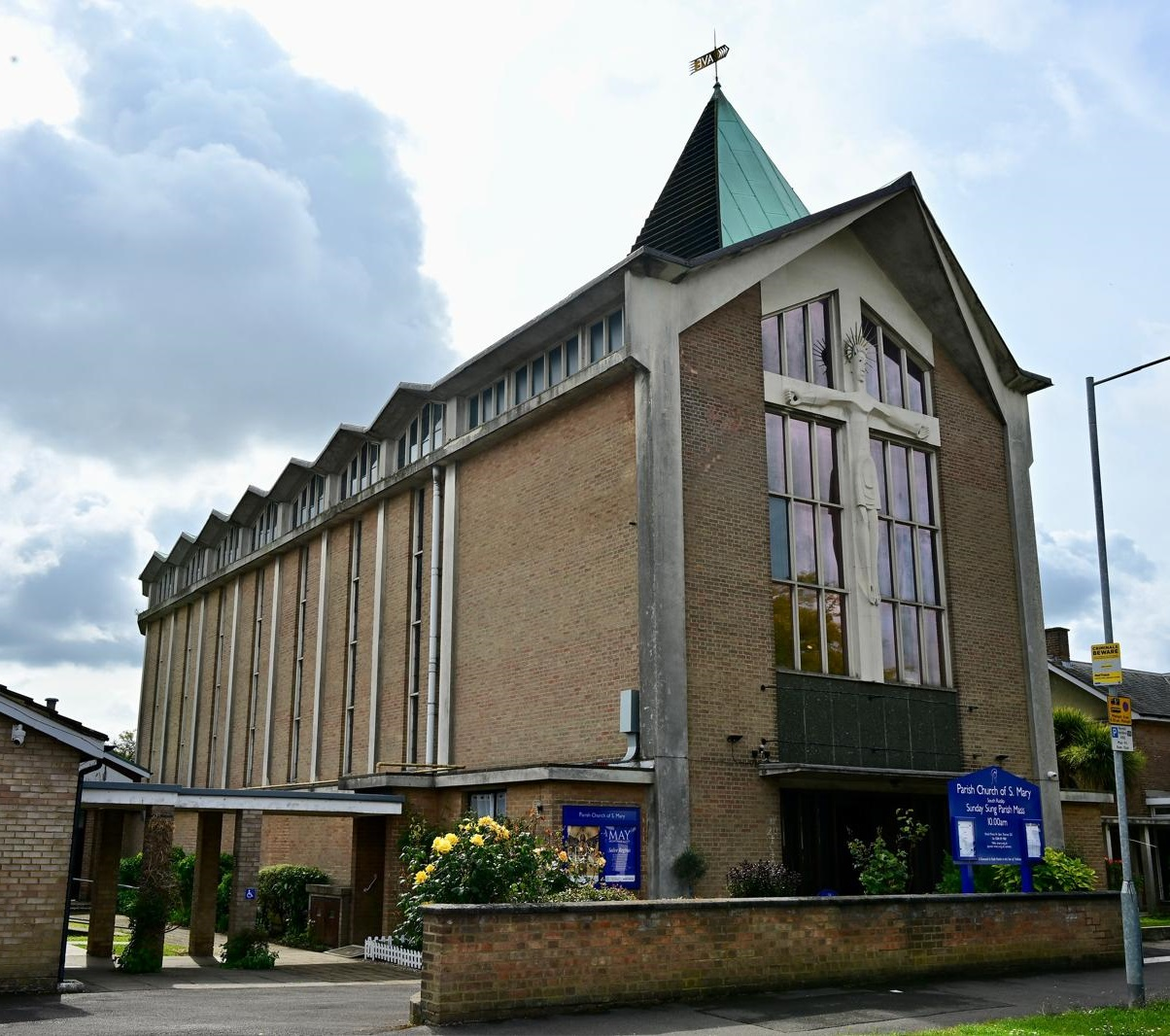
St Mary's Church, South Ruislip

The Church of England parish church of St Mary, South Ruislip was designed by the architect Laurence King in a modern style and constructed between 1957 and 1959.

== Politics ==
South Ruislip is part of the Uxbridge and South Ruislip constituency for elections to the House of Commons.

South Ruislip is part of the South Ruislip ward for elections to Hillingdon London Borough Council.
