= Steve Tuckwell =

British politician

Councillor Steve Tuckwell
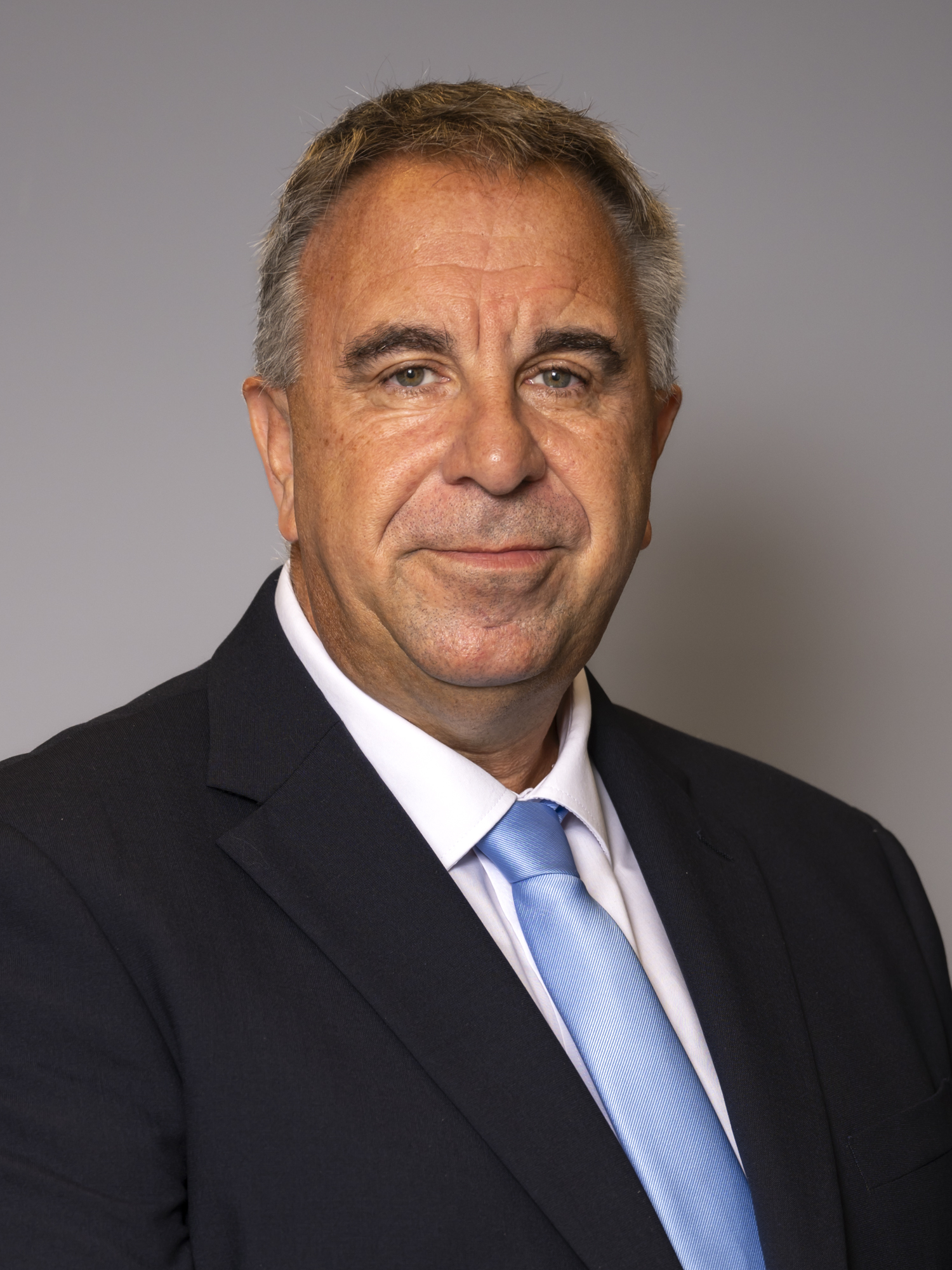
- Official portrait, 2023

Member of Parliament for Uxbridge and South Ruislip
- In office 20 July 2023 – 30 May 2024
- Preceded by: Boris Johnson
- Succeeded by: Danny Beales

Leader of Hillingdon Borough Council
- Incumbent
- Assumed office 14 May 2026
- Deputy: Richard Mills
- Preceded by: Ian Edwards

Member of Hillingdon London Borough Council for South Ruislip
- Incumbent
- Assumed office 7 May 2018

Personal details
- Born: 1968 or 1969 (age 57–58) Hillingdon, London, England
- Party: Conservative
- Domestic partner: Rachel
- Children: 2
- Education: Bishop Ramsey School

Steven Tuckwell (born 1968 or 1969) is a British politician who became the Member of Parliament (MP) for Uxbridge and South Ruislip from 2023 to 2024, in which he succeeded Boris Johnson, the former Prime Minister of the United Kingdom. A member of the Conservative Party, he has also sat on Hillingdon Borough Council since 2018.

He lost his seat in the 2024 general election to Labour's Danny Beales, whom he had narrowly defeated in the 2023 by-election.

== Early life and career before Parliament ==
A third-generation resident of Hillingdon, Tuckwell was born at Hillingdon Hospital. He attended local schools, including Bishop Ramsey School in Ruislip.

Tuckwell previously worked as a manager for Royal Mail. In the May 2018 election, he was elected a Conservative councillor for the ward of South Ruislip on Hillingdon London Borough Council. He was re-elected in May 2022.

At the time of his election to parliament, he worked for a vehicle leasing company.

== Parliamentary career ==
Tuckwell won the seat of Uxbridge and South Ruislip in a by-election held on 20 July 2023 following the resignation of former prime minister Boris Johnson, who had represented the constituency for the Conservative Party since the 2015 general election.

Tuckwell described the by-election as a "referendum on ULEZ", opposing the planned expansion of the Ultra Low Emission Zone (ULEZ) by Sadiq Khan, the Labour mayor of London, and he ran a "one-issue campaign" that avoided mention of his own party. Danny Beales, the Labour by-election candidate, also criticised the expansion. Labour leader Keir Starmer blamed the policy for the party's failure to take the seat.

He was sworn in as an MP on 5 September 2023, following the summer break, alongside Sarah Dyke and Keir Mather. Dyke, a Liberal Democrat, was elected to serve Somerton and Frome, and Mather, of the Labour Party, was elected for Selby and Ainsty in two by-elections held on the same day as Tuckwell's.

Tuckwell was narrowly defeated by Beales, by less than 600 votes, at the 2024 general election.

== Post-parliamentary career ==
As of 2025, Tuckwell served in the executive of Hillingdon London Borough Council, as cabinet member for planning, housing and growth.

After the 2026 Hillingdon London Borough Council election, Tuckwell was elected leader of the Conservative group on the council. On 14 May, Tuckwell was elected leader of the council.

== Personal life ==
Tuckwell lives in Hillingdon with his partner, Rachel. His two children attended local schools.

== See also ==
- List of United Kingdom MPs with the shortest service

Parliament of the United Kingdom
Preceded by Boris Johnson	Member of Parliament for Uxbridge and South Ruislip; 2023–2024	Succeeded by Danny Beales
