= Uxbridge (ward) =

Electoral ward in London, England

- Electoral ward for the Hillingdon London Borough Council
- Uxbridge ward boundaries since 2022
- Borough: Hillingdon
- County: Greater London
- Population: 17,962 (2021) (Note: 2021 Census data reported for 2022 ward boundaries)
- Major settlements: Uxbridge
- Area: 4.186 km²

Current electoral ward
- Created: 2022
- Number of members: 3
- Councillors: Terence Murray; Riley Russell; Anil Taneja
- Created from: Brunel; Uxbridge North; Uxbridge South
- GSS code: E05013580

Uxbridge is an electoral ward in the London Borough of Hillingdon. The ward was first used in the 2022 elections and elects three councillors to Hillingdon London Borough Council.

== Geography ==
The ward is named after the town of Uxbridge.

== Councillors ==
Election	Councillors		
2026	Terence Murray (Conservative)	Riley Russell (Conservative)	Anil Taneja (Conservative)

== Hillingdon council elections ==
The election took place on 7 May 2026.

=== Uxbridge ===
Uxbridge (3)
Party	Candidate	Votes	%	±%
Conservative	Terence Murray	1,715	36.3	
Conservative	Riley Russell	1,705	36.0	
Conservative	Anil Taneja	1,569	33.2	
Labour	Tony Burles	1121	23.7	−22.0
Labour	Masoud Dildar	980	20.7	
Labour	Boikanyo Trust Phenyo	907	19.2	
Reform	Gerry Anderson	808	17.1	
Reform	Douglas Lewis	761	16.1	
Reform	Stephen Lewis	736	15.6	
Green	Andy Panayiotou	646	13.7	+4.8
Green	Amjad Ali	634	13.4	
Green	Peter Ryerson	623	13.2	
Liberal Democrats	Sajid Iqbal	393	8.3	
Liberal Democrats	Max Peston	380	8.0	
Liberal Democrats	Syed Shah	374	7.9	
TUSC	Gary Harbord	86	1.8	−1.5
Turnout		4730	42.12	+3.12
Conservative hold				
Conservative gain from Labour				
Conservative hold				

=== 2022 election ===
The election took place on 5 May 2022.

2022 Hillingdon London Borough Council election: Uxbridge
Party	Candidate	Votes	%	±%
Conservative	Keith Burrows	1,971	51.1	
Labour	Tony Burles	1,764	45.7	
Conservative	Farhad Choubedar	1,740	45.1	
Conservative	Ranjeet Rathore	1,719	44.6	
Labour	Jagdip Gill	1,575	40.8	
Labour	Jess Thurgur	1,572	40.8	
Green	Christine West	452	11.7	
Green	Andronikos Panayiotou	342	8.9	
Green	Michael Ray-Howett	306	7.9	
TUSC	Gary Harbord	129	3.3	
Turnout		3,857	39.0	
Conservative win (new seat)				
Labour win (new seat)				
Conservative win (new seat)				

== See also ==
- List of electoral wards in Greater London
