= South Ruislip (ward) =

Electoral ward in London, England

- Electoral ward for the Hillingdon London Borough Council
- Borough: Hillingdon
- County: Greater London
- Population: 16,838 (2021)
- Major settlements: South Ruislip
- Area: 7.890 km²

Current electoral ward
- Created: 2002
- Seats: 3

South Ruislip is an electoral ward in the London Borough of Hillingdon. The ward was first used in the 2002 elections and elects three councillors to Hillingdon London Borough Council.

== Geography ==
The ward is named after the suburb of South Ruislip.

== Councillors ==
| Election | Councillors | | |
|---|---|---|---|
| 2022 | Richard Mills (Conservative) | Steve Tuckwell (Conservative) | Heena Makwana (Conservative) |

== Elections ==
=== 2022 ===
South Ruislip (3)
| Party | Candidate | Votes | % | ±% |
|---|---|---|---|---|
| Conservative | Richard James Mills | 2,373 | 60.1 | |
| Conservative | Steve Tuckwell | 2,356 | 59.7 | |
| Conservative | Heena Makwana | 2,343 | 59.4 | |
| Labour | Connor Myles Liberty | 1,195 | 30.3 | |
| Labour | Alexander Fraser Sim | 1,176 | 29.8 | |
| Labour | Mohan Lal Sharma | 1,077 | 27.3 | |
| Green | Sandra Mary Baynton | 385 | 9.8 | |
| Green | Deborah Howes | 365 | 9.2 | |
| Independent | Tiffany Rytter | 298 | 7.6 | |
| Green | Peter Leslie Crook | 271 | 6.9 | |
| Turnout | | 3,946 | 35.9 | |
| Conservative hold | | | | |
| Conservative hold | | | | |
| Conservative hold | | | | |

== See also ==
- List of electoral wards in Greater London
