= Jack Erskine =

New Zealand physicist and chess player

John Angus Erskine (28 January 1873 – 27 April 1960, Melbourne) was a New Zealand educated physicist, electrical engineer, benefactor, and chess master.

Born in Invercargill on 28 January 1873, he was a son of Robert Erskine, who migrated from Scotland to Southland, New Zealand, at the age of 16. Jack was educated at South School, and became the first Southland youth to win a Junior Scholarship to the University of New Zealand in 1890. The next year, he chose to enrol at Canterbury College (now University of Canterbury). He passed his final B.A. exams in 1893. With the start of the new term in April 1894, Ernest Rutherford and J.A. Erskine applied to use a basement room in which to carry out electrical experiments. It was here that Erskine investigated the magnetic screening of high-frequency oscillations by various metals, an offshoot of Rutherford's pioneering work. Results of his research appeared in the Transactions of the New Zealand Institute in 1895.

In 1896 Erskine won an 1851 Exhibition Scholarship and opted to study in Berlin at the Friedrich-Wilhelms-Universitat. In 1897, he and Rutherford holidayed together in Germany and year 1897 and part of 1898 Erskine was at the University of Leipzig. He then moved to London and spent 1899 and 1900 there, attending classes at University College and translating German works into English.

In 1901, Erskine returned to New Zealand to work as a boiler stoker. He then began working in the electrical industry, first in the United States (1903–1904), and then Australia (1905–1920). After 1920 he worked as a private consultant in Melbourne. He won the New Zealand Chess Championship twice; at Wellington 1928/29 (with a 100% score, 8/8) and Christchurch 1934/35.

== Erskine Fellowship ==
Erskine bequeathed his estate worth £254,794 to the University of Canterbury to be held in trust to fund international exchanges of academic staff. Each year, approximately 70 Erskine fellows travel to Christchurch for periods of up to three months (with travel and per diem allowance funded) and approximately 25 Canterbury academics are funded to travel to overseas institutions.
