= 1998 Hillingdon London Borough Council election =

1998 local election in England

← 1994	7 May 1998	2002 →

All 69 council seats for Hillingdon London Borough Council 35 seats needed for a majority
- Registered: 177,334
- Turnout: 61,932, 34.92% (▼16.17)

	First party	Second party
Party	Conservative	Labour
Last election	25 seats, 40.92%	43 seats, 44.59%
Seats before	25	43
Seats won	32	31
Seat change	▲9	▼13
Popular vote	68,407	56,205
Percentage	47.33%	38.88%
Swing	▲6.41	▼5.71
	Third party	Fourth party
Party	Liberal Democrats	Ind. Labour Party
Last election	0 seats, 13.79%	1 seat, 0.60%
Seats before	0	1
Seats won	4	0
Seat change	▲4	▼1
Popular vote	18,846	Did not run
Percentage	13.04%	Did not run
Swing	▼0.75	Did not run
Council Control before election
Labour
Council control after election
No Overall Control

The 1998 Hillingdon London Borough Council election took place on 7 May 1998 to elect members of Hillingdon London Borough Council in London, England. The whole council was up for election and the council went into no overall control.

== Election result ==
Hillingdon London Borough Council elections 1998
Party	Seats	Gains	Losses	Net gain/loss	Seats %	Votes %	Votes	+/−
Conservative	34	11	2	▲9	49.27	47.33	68,407	▲6.41
Labour	31	1	13	▼12	44.93	38.88	56,205	▼5.71
Liberal Democrats	4	4	0	▲4	5.80	13.04	18,846	▼0.75
Independent	0	0	0	Steady	0.00	0.47	676	New
Socialist (GB)	0	0	0	Steady	0.00	0.21	300	New
BNP	0	0	0	Steady	0.00	0.07	105	▼0.03
Ind. Labour Party	0	0	1	▼1	0.00	Did not run	Did not run	Did not run
Total	69						144,539	

== Ward results ==
(*) - Indicates an incumbent candidate

(†) - Indicates an incumbent candidate standing in a different ward

=== Barnhill ===
Barnhill (3)
Party	Candidate	Votes	%	±%
Labour	John Major* (Note: Major was elected in a by-election triggered by the resignation of Cllr Gulab Sharma in 1996.)	1,419	74.19	▲0.63
Labour	Lindsay Bliss*	1,360		
Labour	Anthony Way^{†} (Note: Way was a sitting Councillor representing the Yeading ward.)	1,286		
Conservative	Nigel Barker	485	25.81	▼0.63
Conservative	Arthur Preston	478		
Conservative	David Benson	451		
Registered electors		6,850		▲218
Turnout		1,948	28.44	▼18.42
Rejected ballots		10	0.51	▲0.22
Labour hold				
Labour hold				
Labour hold				

=== Botwell ===
Botwell (2)
Party	Candidate	Votes	%	±%
Labour	Linda Allen*	1,012	72.57	▲0.28
Labour	Timothy Freeman	970		
Conservative	Paul Bavington	397	27.43	▼0.28
Conservative	Robert Taylor	352		
Registered electors		4,889		▲141
Turnout		1,442	29.49	▼18.70
Rejected ballots		6	0.42	▲0.16
Labour hold				
Labour hold				

=== Bourne ===
Bourne (2)
Party	Candidate	Votes	%	±%
Conservative	Shirley Harper-O'Neill	895	45.24	▲5.13
Labour	John Morse*	893	44.21	▼2.22
Conservative	Thomas Lackner	858		
Labour	Sabelo Rawana	820		
Liberal Democrats	Margaret Jacobs	215	10.55	▼2.91
Liberal Democrats	Andrew Peach	194		
Registered electors		5,188		▼95
Turnout		2,025	39.03	▼13.69
Rejected ballots		6	0.30	▲0.08
Conservative gain from Labour				
Labour hold				

=== Cavendish ===
Cavendish (2)
Party	Candidate	Votes	%	±%
Liberal Democrats	Stephen Carey	1,426	52.84	▲18.01
Liberal Democrats	Janet Campbell	1,406		
Conservative	Keith Morris*	933	34.15	▼10.08
Conservative	Conn Iggulden	897		
Labour	Jayne Grant	351	13.01	▼7.93
Labour	Alan Gilbert	346		
Registered electors		5,531		▲321
Turnout		2,735	49.45	▼8.30
Rejected ballots		2	0.07	▼0.03
Liberal Democrats gain from Conservative				
Liberal Democrats gain from Conservative				

=== Charville ===
Charville (3)
Party	Candidate	Votes	%	±%
Labour	Michael Craxton*	1,158	47.42	▼6.23
Labour	Edward Harris^{†} (Note: Harris was a sitting councillor representing the Barnhill ward)	1,110		
Labour	Stuart Ouseley	1,028		
Conservative	Kathleen Cooke	946	37.89	▲3.66
Conservative	Mary O'Connor	876		
Conservative	Emile van Laer	812		
Liberal Democrats	Peter Dollimore	265	10.16	▼1.96
Liberal Democrats	Sheila Thomas	227		
Liberal Democrats	Leonard Toms	214		
BNP	Mark Bringlow	105	4.53	New
Registered electors		7,315		▼9
Turnout		2,330	31.85	▼21.25
Rejected ballots		8	0.34	▲0.19
Labour hold				
Labour hold				
Labour hold				

=== Colham ===
Colham (2)
Party	Candidate	Votes	%	±%
Labour	Archibald Morrison	624	47.28	▼5.29
Labour	Mohammed Khursheed	567		
Conservative	Peter Robins	517	39.50	▲9.17
Conservative	Janet Routledge	478		
Liberal Democrats	Florence Price	171	13.22	▼3.87
Liberal Democrats	John Price	162		
Registered electors		4,918		▲126
Turnout		1,325	26.94	▼21.83
Rejected ballots		9	0.68	▲0.59
Labour hold				
Labour hold				

=== Cowley ===
Cowley (3)
Party	Candidate	Votes	%	±%
Conservative	Geoffrey Courtenay	1,245	45.99	▲11.47
Conservative	David Simmonds	1,132		
Labour	Roderick Marshall	1,056	40.92	▼7.96
Labour	Peter Maguire	952		
Labour	Peter Osborne*	933		
Conservative	Sarabjit Singh	928		
Liberal Democrats	Brian Filgate	320	13.09	▼3.51
Liberal Democrats	Andrew Sims	307		
Registered electors		7,050		▲94
Turnout		2,459	34.88	▼14.95
Rejected ballots		9	0.37	▲0.37
Conservative gain from Labour				
Conservative gain from Labour				
Labour hold				

=== Crane ===
Crane (2)
Party	Candidate	Votes	%	±%
Labour	John Oswell* (Note: Oswell was elected in a by-election trigerred by the death of Cllr Christopher Mullen in 1995)	1,044	71.35	▼1.22
Labour	Clifford Pattenden	958		
Conservative	Derek Baxter	436	28.65	▲1.22
Conservative	Cynnthia Robertson	368		
Registered electors		4,988		▲194
Turnout		1,508	30.23	▼17.75
Rejected ballots		11	0.73	▼0.05
Labour hold				
Labour hold				

=== Deansfield ===
Deansfield (2)
Party	Candidate	Votes	%	±%
Conservative	James O'Neill	1,131	48.95	▲2.27
Conservative	Solveig Stone	1,079		
Labour	Ian Mitchell	736	32.29	▼21.03
Labour	Phyllis Sharkey	722		
Liberal Democrats	Michael Cox	471	18.76	New
Liberal Democrats	Amirali Lakha	376		
Registered electors		5,384		▼41
Turnout		2,343	43.52	▼13.03
Rejected ballots		4	0.17	▼0.42
Conservative gain from Labour				
Conservative gain from Labour				

=== Eastcote ===
Eastcote (3)
Party	Candidate	Votes	%	±%
Conservative	Catherine Dann*	1,980	63.24	▲4.55
Conservative	Graham Horn*	1,911		
Conservative	David Payne*	1,892		
Labour	Michael Roberts	628	20.42	▼0.25
Labour	Graeme Matthews	623		
Labour	Anthony Scott	616		
Liberal Democrats	David Marshall	546	16.34	▼4.80
Liberal Democrats	Garth Underwood	484		
Liberal Democrats	Melanie Winterbotham	464		
Registered electors		7,722		▲41
Turnout		3,053	39.54	▼11.68
Rejected ballots		13	0.43	▲0.28
Conservative hold				
Conservative hold				
Conservative hold				

=== Harefield ===
Harefield (2)
Party	Candidate	Votes	%	±%
Conservative	Sandra Jenkins	899	46.20	▲10.16
Conservative	Caroline Mutton	839		
Labour	Pauline Crawley*	838	41.95	▼12.54
Labour	Anthony Burles*	740		
Liberal Democrats	Elizabeth Jelfs	239	11.85	▲2.38
Liberal Democrats	James Jelfs	207		
Registered electors		5,346		▲471
Turnout		1,964	36.74	▲0.70
Rejected ballots		3	0.15	▲0.07
Conservative gain from Labour				
Conservative gain from Labour				

=== Harlington ===
Harlington (3)
Party	Candidate	Votes	%	±%
Labour	Brian Neighbour*	1,247	53.20	▲2.04
Labour	Graham Tomlin*	1,163		
Labour	Marion Way*	1,154		
Conservative	Marion Howell	640	27.80	▲5.12
Conservative	Matthew Fitzpatrick	625		
Conservative	Philip Newman	597		
Liberal Democrats	Anthony Little	538	14.66	▼11.50
Liberal Democrats	Barbara Grange	239		
Liberal Democrats	Tracy Taylor	205		
Independent	Robert Lewis	97	4.34	New
Registered electors		7,254		▲41
Turnout		2,179	30.04	▼20.31
Rejected ballots		4	0.18	▲0.18
Labour hold				
Labour hold				
Labour hold				

=== Heathrow ===
Heathrow (2)
Party	Candidate	Votes	%	±%
Labour	Catherine Stocker*	920	56.87	▼4.36
Labour	Michael Usher* (Note: Usher was elected in a by-election triggered by the Death of Cllr Philip Kordun in 1997)	864		
Conservative	Philip O'Connor	513	31.65	▲0.71
Conservative	Neil O'Connor	480		
Liberal Democrats	Carl Nielsen	204	11.48	New
Liberal Democrats	Stuart Gunn	156		
Registered electors		5,640		▲282
Turnout		1,640	29.08	▼20.53
Rejected ballots		9	0.55	▲0.32
Labour hold				
Labour hold				

=== Hillingdon East ===
Hillingdon East (2)
Party	Candidate	Votes	%	±%
Labour	David Horne^{†} (Note: Horne was a sitting councillor representing the Deansfield ward)	691	41.84	▲15.20
Labour	Iain McIntosh	689		
Conservative	Michael Gibson^{†} (Note: Gibson was a sitting councillor representing the Hillingdon West ward)	618	36.05	▲13.35
Conservative	Ian Taylor	571		
Liberal Democrats	Audrey Monk	217	12.10	▼1.49
Liberal Democrats	Jennifer Vernaza	182		
Socialist (GB)	Julia Leonard^{†} (Note: Leonard was a sitting councillor representing the Yeading ward. she was elected as a Labour councillor but decided to run this election with the Socialist Party of Great Britain)	165	10.01	New
Registered electors		5,329		▲155
Turnout		1,657	31.09	▼23.82
Rejected ballots		3	0.18	▲0.07
Labour hold				
Labour gain from Independent Labour				

=== Hillingdon North ===
Hillingdon North (2)
Party	Candidate	Votes	%	±%
Liberal Democrats	Jill Rhodes	942	40.93	▲5.09
Liberal Democrats	Andrew Vernazza	919		
Labour	John Bebbington*	764	33.19	▼7.96
Labour	John Lonsdale*	745		
Conservative	Colin Giddings	605	25.88	▲2.87
Conservative	Jane Crease^{†} (Note: Crease was a sitting councillor representing the Hillingdon West ward)	572		
Registered electors		5,116		▲41
Turnout		1,989	38.88	▼23.13
Rejected ballots		0	0.00	Steady
Liberal Democrats gain from Labour				
Liberal Democrats gain from Labour				

=== Hillingdon West ===
Hillingdon West (3)
Party	Candidate	Votes	%	±%
Conservative	Josephine Barrett	1,131	57.21	▲13.27
Conservative	Valeries Robins	1,099		
Conservative	Alfred Langley*	1,086		
Labour	Paul Barker	600	28.85	▼10.23
Labour	Jonathan Hill	536		
Labour	Sean McWhinnie	536		
Liberal Democrats	Eileen Holland	288	13.94	▼3.04
Liberal Democrats	Tony Bennett	277		
Liberal Democrats	Patrick Filgate	243		
Registered electors		7,458		▼63
Turnout		1,989	26.67	▼15.48
Rejected ballots		11	0.55	▲0.55
Conservative hold				
Conservative hold				
Conservative hold				

=== Ickenham ===
Ickenham (3)
Party	Candidate	Votes	%	±%
Conservative	Jacqueline Griffith	2,626	67.49	▲8.11
Conservative	Richard Barnes*	2,588		
Conservative	Raymond Puddifoot	2,576		
Labour	John Buckingham	847	20.86	▼0.89
Labour	Linda Buckingham	809		
Labour	Deborah Needham	752		
Liberal Democrats	Montague Cooke	475	11.65	▼7.22
Liberal Democrats	Alison Rudin	440		
Liberal Democrats	Shani Roberts	429		
Registered electors		8,909		▲237
Turnout		3,983	44.71	▼10.57
Rejected ballots		11	0.28	▲0.28
Conservative hold				
Conservative hold				
Conservative hold				

=== Manor ===
Manor (2)
Party	Candidate	Votes	%	±%
Conservative	David Yarrow*	1,158	53.88	▲7.50
Conservative	Mohammad Miraj	1,023		
Labour	Robert Nunn	587	28.41	▼0.72
Labour	Peter McDonald	563		
Liberal Democrats	Kim Mathen	379	17.71	▼6.78
Liberal Democrats	Norma Scott	338		
Registered electors		5,527		▲137
Turnout		2,047	37.04	▼16.74
Rejected ballots		4	0.20	▼0.21
Conservative hold				
Conservative hold				

=== Northwood ===
Northwood (3)
Party	Candidate	Votes	%	±%
Conservative	Robert Benson	1,707	68.95	▲2.28
Conservative	Scott Seaman-Digby	1,621		
Conservative	Albert Kanjee*	1,572		
Labour	Dorothy Blundell^{†} (Note: Blundell was a sitting councillor representing the West Drayton ward)	462	17.34	▲2.75
Labour	Gilbert Greenall	388		
Labour	Joseph Daniel	382		
Liberal Democrats	Keith Baker	363	13.71	▼5.03
Liberal Democrats	Jane Woodnutt	329		
Liberal Democrats	Shelagh Marshall	282		
Registered electors		7,556		▲370
Turnout		2,466	32.64	▼12.10
Rejected ballots		9	0.36	▲0.20
Conservative hold				
Conservative hold				
Conservative hold				

=== Northwood Hills ===
Northwood Hills (3)
Party	Candidate	Votes	%	±%
Conservative	David Bishop*	1,357	55.20	▲3.32
Conservative	Jonathan Bianco^{†} (Note: Bianco was a sitting councillor representing the Northwood ward)	1,318		
Conservative	Andrew Retter*	1,316		
Labour	Ruth Allan	770	27.84	▼0.86
Labour	Susan Hull	625		
Labour	Margaret McDonald	618		
Liberal Democrats	Henry Scott	440	16.96	▼2.46
Liberal Democrats	Gerard Grange	405		
Liberal Democrats	Neville Parsonage	381		
Registered electors		7,762		▲409
Turnout		2,504	32.26	▼16.94
Rejected ballots		21	0.84	▲0.70
Conservative hold				
Conservative hold				
Conservative hold				

=== Ruislip ===
Ruislip (2)
Party	Candidate	Votes	%	±%
Conservative	Michael Kilbey*	1,426	63.76	▲10.41
Conservative	Maurice Lancaster*	1,340		
Labour	Clifford Barton	467	21.16	▲0.61
Labour	David Herriott	451		
Liberal Democrats	Alexander Wilson	335	15.08	▼11.02
Liberal Democrats	Franci Croce	319		
Registered electors		5,580		▲32
Turnout		2,215	39.70	▼13.36
Rejected ballots		8	0.36	▲0.22
Conservative hold				
Conservative hold				

=== St Martins ===
St Martins (2)
Party	Candidate	Votes	%	±%
Conservative	Philip Corthorne*	1,409	54.69	▲1.34
Conservative	Douglas Mills*	1,279		
Labour	Alan Howard	548	21.42	▲0.87
Labour	Trevor Richards	505		
Liberal Democrats	Hilary Leighter	342	13.88	▼12.22
Liberal Democrats	Richard Bonner	340		
Independent	John Payton	246	10.01	New
Registered electors		5,842		▲294
Turnout		2,412	41.29	▼11.77
Rejected ballots		10	0.41	▲0.27
Conservative hold				
Conservative hold				

=== Townfield ===
Townfield (3)
Party	Candidate	Votes	%	±%
Labour	Roy Hill	1,697	61.47	▼7.87
Labour	Dalip Chand*	1,676		
Labour	Jeanne Smith	1,664		
Conservative	Sandra Anderson	789	26.34	▼4.32
Conservative	Michael Kirby	750		
Conservative	Imtiaz Ahmad	619		
Independent	Hamid Farooqi	333	12.19	New
Registered electors		8,450		▲428
Turnout		2,809	33.24	▼17.13
Rejected ballots		25	0.89	▲0.40
Labour hold				
Labour hold				
Labour hold				

=== Uxbridge North ===
Uxbridge North (2)
Party	Candidate	Votes	%	±%
Conservative	George Cooper*	1,229	61.92	▲9.38
Conservative	Michael Heywood*	1,118		
Labour	Doreen Dell	453	20.24	▼6.14
Liberal Democrats	Rosemary Gill	338	17.84	▼3.24
Labour	Sameena Khan	314		
Registered electors		5,000		▲113
Turnout		2,327	46.54	▼7.38
Rejected ballots		31	1.33	▲1.03
Conservative hold				
Conservative hold				

=== Uxbridge South ===
Uxbridge South (2)
Party	Candidate	Votes	%	±%
Labour	James Jonas	729	52.11	▼8.98
Labour	Anne O'Shea^{†} (Note: O'Shea was a sitting councillor representing the Deansfield ward)	689		
Conservative	David Hare	659	47.89	▲22.33
Conservative	David Routledge	644		
Registered electors		4,057		▼26
Turnout		1,430	35.25	▼15.33
Rejected ballots		16	1.12	▲0.97
Labour hold				
Labour hold				

=== West Drayton ===
West Drayton (2)
Party	Candidate	Votes	%	±%
Conservative	Ann Banks	1,271	57.04	▲18.90
Conservative	Dipak Patel	1,172		
Labour	Leigh Farrow	668	28.53	▼18.05
Labour	Ashok Rator	554		
Liberal Democrats	Kay Hooker	309	14.43	▼0.84
Registered electors		5,256		▲65
Turnout		1,989	37.84	▼14.42
Rejected ballots		0	0.00	▼0.18
Conservative gain from Labour				
Conservative gain from Labour				

=== Wood End ===
Wood End (2)
Party	Candidate	Votes	%	±%
Labour	Janet Gardner*	916	55.19	▼5.99
Labour	Peter Ryerson*	839		
Conservative	Albert Tyrrell	519	32.04	▲6.09
Conservative	Sian Kelly	500		
Liberal Democrats	Beryl Bell	203	12.77	▼0.10
Registered electors		5,004		▲103
Turnout		1,609	32.15	▼18.94
Rejected ballots		7	0.44	▲0.20
Labour hold				
Labour hold				

=== Yeading ===
Yeading (3)
Party	Candidate	Votes	%	±%
Labour	David Allam	1,191	57.84	▼7.06
Labour	Parmjit Dhanda	1,043		
Labour	Mahan Dhillon	984		
Conservative	Bruce Howell	573	29.49	▼5.61
Conservative	Andrew Teebay	545		
Conservative	Mohammad Bamber	523		
Socialist (GB)	Lee Ellery	235	12.67	New
Registered electors		7,173		▲615
Turnout		1,917	26.73	▼20.63
Rejected ballots		14	0.73	▲0.09
Labour hold				
Labour hold				
Labour hold				

=== Yiewsley ===
Yiewsley (2)
Party	Candidate	Votes	%	±%
Conservative	Daniel Banks	715	45.56	▲10.99
Conservative	Mark Chester	713		
Labour	Paul Harmsworth*	694	41.96	▼23.47
Labour	Norman Nunn-Price^{†} (Note: Nunn-Price was a sitting councillor representing the Bourne ward)	621		
Liberal Democrats	Christopher Gee	205	12.48	New
Liberal Democrats	Margaret Wainwright	186		
Registered electors		5,240		▼40
Turnout		1,638	31.26	▼16.25
Rejected ballots		7	0.43	▼0.09
Conservative gain from Labour				
Conservative gain from Labour				
