= 1990 Hillingdon London Borough Council election =

1990 local election in England

← 1986	3 May 1990	1994 →

All 69 seats for Hillingdon London Borough Council 35 seats needed for a majority
- Registered: 177,859
- Turnout: 94,069, 52.89%
	First party	Second party	Third party
Party	Conservative	Labour	Liberal Democrats
Seats before	28	34	7
Seats won	35	34	0 (Note: Includes results from candidates running as Lib Dem Focus Team)
Seat change	▲7	Steady	▼7
Popular vote	107,701	80,976	19,785
Percentage	50.33%	37.84%	9.24%
Council control before election
No Overall Control
Council control after election
Conservative

The 1990 Hillingdon Council election took place on 3 May 1990 to elect members of Hillingdon London Borough Council in London, England. The whole council was up for election and the Conservative Party gained overall control of the council.

== Election result ==
Hillingdon local election result 1990
Party	Seats	Gains	Losses	Net gain/loss	Seats %	Votes %	Votes	+/−
Conservative	35	7	0	▲7	50.73	50.33	107,701	
Labour	34	3	3	Steady	49.28	37.84	80,976	
Liberal Democrats	0	0	7	▼7	0.00	9.24	19,785	
Green	0	0	0	Steady	0.00	2.51	5,363	
Independent	0	0	0	Steady	0.00	0.07	153	
BNP	0	0	0	Steady	0.00	0.01	32	
Total	69						214,010	

== Ward results ==
(*) - Indicates an incumbent candidate

(†) - Indicates an incumbent candidate who is running in a different ward

=== Barnhill ===
Barnhill (3)
Party	Candidate	Votes	%
Labour	Edward A. Harris^{†} (Note: Edward was originally a councillor representing the Yeading ward)	2,156	63.85
Labour	Stephen L. Soskin	1,938	
Labour	Prakash P.K. Auchombit	1,921	
Conservative	Peggy M. Atthey	1,190	36.15
Conservative	Arthur J. Preston	1,135	
Conservative	Cynthia I. Robertson	1,081	
Registered electors		7,204	
Turnout		3,466	48.11
Rejected ballots		20	0.58
Labour hold			
Labour hold			
Labour hold			

=== Botwell ===
Botwell (2)
Party	Candidate	Votes	%
Labour	Jonathan Davey*	1,388	58.18
Labour	Sarah K. Dobson	1,293	
Conservative	Ann F. Banks	748	32.10
Conservative	Percy H. King	732	
Liberal Democrats	Andrew P. Cottrell	224	9.72
Registered electors		5,287	
Turnout		2,458	46.49
Rejected ballots		6	0.24
Labour hold			
Labour hold			

=== Bourne ===
Bourne (2)
Party	Candidate	Votes	%
Conservative	Thomas M. Lackner	1,367	48.30
Conservative	James J. O'Neill*	1,332	
Labour	Jennifer Fletcher	1,260	43.36
Labour	James B. McGurk	1,163	
Liberal Democrats	Hilary F. Leighter	257	8.34
Liberal Democrats	Kim M. Mathen	208	
Registered electors		5,169	
Turnout		2,937	56.82
Rejected ballots		10	0.34
Conservative gain from Labour			
Conservative hold			

=== Cavendish ===
Cavendish (2)
Party	Candidate	Votes	%
Conservative	Catherine S. Dann	1,481	47.13
Conservative	Timothy R. Jones	1,414	
Lib Dem Focus Team	Stephen J. Carey*	1,158	35.03
Lib Dem Focus Team	Angela J. Wegener*	994	
Labour	Maureen Crimmins	484	15.01
Labour	Eric P. Edlin	438	
Green	Robert Ersanilli	96	2.83
Green	Julie N. Hynds	78	
Registered electors		5,031	
Turnout		3,213	63.86
Rejected ballots		4	0.13
Conservative gain from Lib Dem Focus Team			
Conservative gain from Lib Dem Focus Team			

=== Charville ===
Charville (3)
Party	Candidate	Votes	%
Labour	Michael C. Craxton*	1,885	48.89
Conservative	Kim M. Abbott	1,870	51.11
Conservative	Patrick A. Cooke	1,832	
Conservative	Albert J. Tyrrell	1,776	
Labour	Anna T. Lefort	1,698	
Labour	Karen R. Livney^{†}	1,659	
Registered electors		7,586	
Turnout		3,955	52.14
Rejected ballots		18	0.46
Labour hold			
Conservative gain from Labour			
Conservative gain from Labour			

=== Colham ===
Colham (2)
Party	Candidate	Votes	%
Labour	Brian F. Hudson*	1,276	48.92
Labour	Philip E. Kordun*	1,077	
Conservative	Terry E. Loran	1,012	40.48
Conservative	Janis Russell	936	
Liberal Democrats	John M. Price	255	10.60
Registered electors		4,908	
Turnout		2,532	51.59
Rejected ballots		2	0.08
Labour hold			
Labour hold			

=== Cowley ===
Cowley (3)
Party	Candidate	Votes	%
Labour	John A. Frost^{†} (Note: John was originally a councillor representing the Charville ward)	1,609	39.80
Labour	David Williams	1,557	
Labour	Peter James*	1,542	
Conservative	Betty M. Buttrum	1,537	37.47
Conservative	Leonard D. Hyde	1,453	
Conservative	John E. Morgan	1,441	
Green	Helene J. Murphy	535	12.76
Green	Anthony C. Wilkinson	471	
Liberal Democrats	Graham J. Hutton	393	9.97
Registered electors		6,904	
Turnout		3,833	55.52
Rejected ballots		8	0.21
Labour hold			
Labour hold			
Labour hold			

=== Crane ===
Crane (2)
Party	Candidate	Votes	%
Labour	Patrick R. Lyons*	1,279	56.02
Labour	David E. Roberts	1,169	
Conservative	Derek D. Baxter	757	33.32
Conservative	Peter Clements	698	
Liberal Democrats	Colin S. Rodden	233	10.66
Registered electors		5,010	
Turnout		2,279	45.49
Rejected ballots		3	0.13
Labour hold			
Labour hold			

=== Deansfield ===
Deansfield (2)
Party	Candidate	Votes	%
Conservative	Maurice E. Lancaster	1,427	41.79
Conservative	Gordon D. McNulty	1,337	
Labour	Anne O'Shea	934	27.64
Labour	David J. Horne	893	
Lib Dem Focus Team	Charles E. Wegener*	871	26.00
Lib Dem Focus Team	Richard A. Bonner	849	
Green	Nicholas P. Cowper	167	4.57
Green	Greta Stevens	135	
Registered electors		5,665	
Turnout		3,480	61.43
Rejected ballots		15	0.43
Conservative gain from Lib Dem Focus Team			
Conservative hold			

=== Eastcote ===
Eastcote (3)
Party	Candidate	Votes	%
Conservative	Leonard J. Lally*	3,140	72.24
Conservative	Graham E.M. Horn* (Note: Replaced Terence Dicks as councillor after he resigned in 1987)	3,051	
Conservative	David W. Payne*	3,043	
Labour	Sarah P. Johnson	738	16.64
Labour	Ruth E. Laver	700	
Labour	Michael J.S. Roberts	688	
Liberal Democrats	Mary G. Butcher	520	11.12
Liberal Democrats	Garth L. Underwood	485	
Liberal Democrats	Eva N. Tenekedjian	416	
Registered electors		7,810	
Turnout		4,368	55.93
Rejected ballots		6	0.14
Conservative hold			
Conservative hold			
Conservative hold			

=== Harefield ===
Harefield (2)
Party	Candidate	Votes	%
Conservative	Donald H. Mitchell*	1,267	41.72
Conservative	Kenneth R. Abel*	1,171	
Labour	Christopher J. Malkin	1,059	35.73
Labour	Trevor A.T. Richards	1,029	
Green	Ian E. Flindall	527	16.97
Green	Geoffrey Stephenson	464	
Liberal Democrats	Elizabeth V. Jelfs	163	5.58
Registered electors		5,101	
Turnout		3,039	59.58
Rejected ballots		4	0.13
Conservative hold			
Conservative hold			

=== Harlington ===
Harlington (3)
Party	Candidate	Votes	%
Labour	Joseph Fenton^{†} (Note: Joseph was originally a councillor representing the Yeading ward)	1,550	41.75
Labour	Brian T. Neighbour*	1,486	
Labour	Marion Way	1,353	
Conservative	Michael H. Berry	1,266	33.76
Conservative	Michael P. O'Connor	1,160	
Conservative	Douglas Whitehead	1,123	
Liberal Democrats	Anthony J. Little	1,034	24.49
Liberal Democrats	Ann-Marie Sharkey	787	
Liberal Democrats	Abdul R. Quraishi	752	
Registered electors		7,534	
Turnout		3,780	50.17
Rejected ballots		3	0.08
Labour hold			
Labour hold			
Labour gain from Liberal Democrats			

=== Heathrow ===
Heathrow (2)
Party	Candidate	Votes	%
Labour	Keith J. Dobson^{†} (Note: Keith was originally a councillor representing the Barnhill ward)	1,342	49.88
Labour	Alan J. Boddy	1,236	
Conservative	Michael J. Heywood	1,033	39.86
Conservative	Charles W.G. Rackstraw	1,027	
Liberal Democrats	Philip T. Sherwood	265	10.26
Registered electors		5,701	
Turnout		2,716	47.64
Rejected ballots		6	0.22
Labour hold			
Labour hold			

=== Hillingdon East ===
Hillingdon East (2)
Party	Candidate	Votes	%
Labour	Walter D. Kennedy	1,188	43.48
Labour	Amir Osman	1,012	
Conservative	Michael J. Gibson	953	36.48
Conservative	Susan E. James	893	
Liberal Democrats	Michael J. Fordham	535	20.04
Liberal Democrats	Margaret G.V. Wainwright	479	
Registered electors		5,252	
Turnout		2,775	52.84
Rejected ballots		10	0.36
Labour hold			
Labour hold			

=== Hillingdon North ===
Hillingdon North (2)
Party	Candidate	Votes	%
Labour	John Bebbington	1,183	36.81
Labour	John G. Lonsdale	1,163	
Conservative	Christopher F. Holland	1,058	33.07
Conservative	William N. Paxton	1,050	
Lib Dem Focus Team	Brian Outhwaite*	885	25.26
Lib Dem Focus Team	Patrick F. Filgate*	724	
Green	Paul S. Wellington	126	3.86
Green	Tania M. Tanner	119	
BNP	Steven J. Moore	32	1.00
Registered electors		5,360	
Turnout		3,357	62.63
Rejected ballots		7	0.21
Labour gain from Lib Dem Focus Team			
Labour gain from Lib Dem Focus Team			

=== Hillingdon West ===
Hillingdon West (3)
Party	Candidate	Votes	%
Conservative	Andrew J. Boff*	1,804	50.74
Conservative	Elsie G. Boff*	1,725	
Conservative	Alfred G. Langley* (Note: Replaced Ernest Ing as councillor after he resigned in 1989)	1,604	
Labour	Ruchard Farrell	1,045	30.25
Labour	Michael M. Walker	1,008	
Labour	Stuart C. Rogers	1,006	
Liberal Democrats	Peter R. Craxton	344	10.20
Green	Clare C. Mitchell	300	8.81
Green	Jane K. Dyson	293	
Registered electors		7,381	
Turnout		3,307	44.80
Rejected ballots		2	0.06
Conservative hold			
Conservative hold			
Conservative hold			

=== Ickenham ===
Ickenham (3)
Party	Candidate	Votes	%
Conservative	Robert G. Taylor	3,496	65.11
Conservative	Richard M. Barnes	3,475	
Conservative	Mavis Knight*	3,437	
Labour	John Buckingham	991	17.44
Labour	Janet Pascoe	923	
Labour	William T. Gay	874	
Green	John B. Bandler	591	9.59
Liberal Democrats	Rosemary Gill	419	7.86
Green	Richard S. Ives	430	
Registered electors		8,900	
Turnout		5,244	58.92
Rejected ballots		8	0.15
Conservative hold			
Conservative hold			
Conservative hold			

=== Manor ===
Manor (2)
Party	Candidate	Votes	%
Conservative	Edwin Hales*	1,710	55.41
Conservative	David A. Yarrow	1,598	
Labour	Martin Hunt	734	22.18
Lib Dem Focus Team	Michael Cox	713	22.41
Lib Dem Focus Team	Anthony W. Worker	624	
Labour	Sabelo Rawana	589	
Registered electors		5,529	
Turnout		3,174	57.41
Rejected ballots		4	0.13
Conservative hold			
Conservative gain from Alliance			

=== Northwood ===
Northwood (3)
Party	Candidate	Votes	%
Conservative	Frank W. Taylor*	2,574	70.07
Conservative	Jonathan P.S. Bianco*	2,538	
Conservative	Albert Kanjee	2,367	
Labour	Gilbert Greenall	482	12.73
Labour	Janette E. Michael	472	
Labour	Richard H. Zoltowski	405	
Liberal Democrats	Joy R. Drew	393	9.75
Liberal Democrats	Norma J. Dawlings	355	
Liberal Democrats	Andrew W. Peach	294	
Green	Tadcusz K. Potiszil	265	7.45
Registered electors		7,261	
Turnout		3,605	49.65
Rejected ballots		6	0.17
Conservative hold			
Conservative hold			
Conservative hold			

=== Northwood Hills ===
Northwood Hills (3)
Party	Candidate	Votes	%
Conservative	Derek N. List*	2,170	58.79
Conservative	Andrew J. Retter	2,101	
Conservative	Graham E. Sewell*	2,098	
Labour	Ruth Allan	1,085	28.66
Labour	Thomas J. Atkins	1,039	
Labour	Margaret M. Bartlett	980	
Liberal Democrats	Richard K. Drew	474	12.55
Liberal Democrats	Leslie C. Butcher	455	
Liberal Democrats	David W.G. Cox	430	
Registered electors		7,394	
Turnout		3,795	51.33
Rejected ballots		7	0.18
Conservative hold			
Conservative hold			
Conservative hold			

=== Ruislip ===
Ruislip (2)
Party	Candidate	Votes	%
Conservative	Edmund G. Booth*	2,192	70.28
Conservative	Michael Kilbey*	2,050	
Labour	Clifford C. Barton	579	18.36
Labour	David R. Herriott	529	
Liberal Democrats	Sidney H. Davidson	371	11.36
Liberal Democrats	Neville G. Parsonage	314	
Registered electors		5,623	
Turnout		3,159	56.18
Rejected ballots		3	0.09
Conservative hold			
Conservative hold			

=== St Martins ===
St Martins (2)
Party	Candidate	Votes	%
Conservative	Douglas S. Mills*	2,015	65.19
Conservative	Derek J. Tow	1,977	
Labour	Alan H. Howard	720	22.99
Labour	Peter D. Moorhouse	687	
Liberal Democrats	Stuart Gunn	388	11.82
Liberal Democrats	Melanie M. Winterbotham	335	
Registered electors		6,001	
Turnout		3,227	53.77
Rejected ballots		3	0.09
Conservative hold			
Conservative hold			

=== Townfield ===
Townfield (3)
Party	Candidate	Votes	%
Labour	Graham C. Rogers*	2,312	64.94
Labour	Mark V. Gage^{†} (Note: Mark was originally a councillor that represented Bourne)	2,302	
Labour	Susan C. Saunders	2,287	
Conservative	Daniel A. Banks	1,266	35.06
Conservative	Sylvia C. Hector	1,254	
Conservative	Laurence F. Redding	1,206	
Registered electors		8,309	
Turnout		3,969	47.77
Rejected ballots		14	0.35
Labour hold			
Labour hold			
Labour hold			

=== Uxbridge North ===
Uxbridge North (2)
Party	Candidate	Votes	%
Conservative	George E. Cooper	1,752	64.38
Conservative	David W. Harnott*	1,736	
Labour	James A. Jonas	644	23.33
Labour	Michael M. Murray	619	
Liberal Democrats	Keith Hales	333	12.29
Registered electors		5,049	
Turnout		2,750	54.47
Rejected ballots		0	0.00
Conservative hold			
Conservative hold			

=== Uxbridge South ===
Uxbridge South (2)
Party	Candidate	Votes	%
Labour	Gordon McI. Bogan*	1,092	45.26
Labour	Michael J. Nash	1,055	
Conservative	Graham Reeves	754	31.01
Conservative	Ian C. Taylor	718	
Green	David M. Cooke	344	14.50
Liberal Democrats	Allan Wainwright	219	9.23
Registered electors		4,246	
Turnout		2,250	52.99
Rejected ballots		3	0.13
Labour hold			
Labour hold			

=== West Drayton ===
West Drayton (2)
Party	Candidate	Votes	%
Conservative	Kevin Brookes*	1,432	48.90
Conservative	Norman C. Hawkins	1,426	
Labour	Hubert J.C. Key	1,084	37.10
Labour	Helen E. Harmsworth	1,083	
Green	Tracie Stevens	232	7.22
Liberal Democrats	David P. Morgan	198	6.78
Green	William G. Cheesbrough	190	
Registered electors		5,557	
Turnout		3,060	55.07
Rejected ballots		3	0.10
Conservative hold			
Conservative hold			

=== Wood End ===
Wood End (2)
Party	Candidate	Votes	%
Labour	Graham R. Tomlin*	1,331	55.23
Labour	Peter M. Ryerson* (Note: Replaced cllr. Peter Fagan after he resigned in 1988)	1,287	
Conservative	Elizabeth Bryant	868	36.04
Conservative	William S. Moore	839	
Liberal Democrats	Beryl D. Bell	214	8.73
Liberal Democrats	Steven P. Helme	199	
Registered electors		5,119	
Turnout		2,533	49.48
Rejected ballots		1	0.04
Labour hold			
Labour hold			

=== Yeading ===
Yeading (3)
Party	Candidate	Votes	%
Labour	Leonard E. Smith	1,654	56.13
Labour	John Walker	1,603	
Labour	Steve Panayi	1,565	
Conservative	Bruce Howell	1,295	43.87
Conservative	Mary A. O'Connor	1,262	
Conservative	Andrew P. Teebay	1,211	
Registered electors		6,525	
Turnout		3,093	47.40
Rejected ballots		15	0.49
Labour hold			
Labour hold			
Labour hold			

=== Yiewsley ===
Yiewsley (2)
Party	Candidate	Votes	%
Labour	Paul K. Harmsworth*	1,357	48.54
Labour	Ruth E. Willis	1,207	
Conservative	Ann Caravan	999	37.11
Conservative	John R. Hanson	961	
Liberal Democrats	Dennis V. Tuckwell	226	8.56
Independent	Graham W. Hutchinson	153	5.79
Registered electors		5,443	
Turnout		2,715	49.88
Rejected ballots		2	0.07
Labour hold			
Labour hold			
