= 1994 Hillingdon London Borough Council election =

1994 local election in England

- 5 May 1994

All 69 seats up for election to Hillingdon London Borough Council 35 seats needed for a majority
- Registered: 172,926
- Turnout: 88,348, 51.09% (▼1.80)

	First party	Second party
Leader	Steve Panayi	Richard Barnes
Party	Labour	Conservative
Leader since	8 May 1993	8 January 1992
Leader's seat	Yeading	Ickenham
Last election	34 seats, 37.84%	35 seats, 50.33%
Seats before	34	34
Seats won	43	25
Seat change	▲9	▼9
Popular vote	91,098	83,605
Percentage	44.59%	40.92%
Swing	▲6.75	▼9.41
	Third party	Fourth party
Leader	N/A	Anthony Little
Party	Independent Labour	Liberal Democrats
Leader since	N/A	6 May 1982
Leader's seat	N/A	Harlington
Last election	Did not stand	0 seats, 9.24%
Seats before	1	0
Seats won	1	0
Seat change	Steady	Steady
Popular vote	1,223	28,172
Percentage	0.60%	13.79%
Swing	New	▲4.55
Council control before election
No Overall Control
Council control after election
Labour

The 1994 Hillingdon Council election was held on 5 May 1994 to elect members of the Hillingdon London Borough Council in London, England. The whole council was up for election and the Labour Party gained overall control of the council.

== Election result ==
Hillingdon London Borough Council elections 1994
Party	Seats	Gains	Losses	Net gain/loss	Seats %	Votes %	Votes	+/−
Labour	43	9	0	▲9	62.32	44.59	91,098	▲6.75
Conservative	25	0	9	▼9	36.23	40.92	83,605	▼9.41
Independent Labour	1	0	0	Steady	1.45	0.60	1,223	New
Liberal Democrats	0	0	0	Steady	0.00	13.79	28,172	▲4.55
BNP	0	0	0	Steady	0.00	0.10	203	▲0.09
Total	69						204,301	

== Ward results ==
(*) - Indicates an incumbent candidate

(†) - Indicates an incumbent candidate standing in a different ward

=== Barnhill ===
Barnhill (3)
Party	Candidate	Votes	%	±%
Labour	Edward Harris*	2,101	73.56	▲9.71
Labour	Lindsay Bliss	2,082		
Labour	Gulab Sharma	1,852		
Conservative	Arthur Preston	757	26.44	▼9.71
Conservative	Timothy Jones	717		
Conservative	Cynthia Robertson	695		
Registered electors		6,632		▼572
Turnout		3,108	46.86	▼1.25
Rejected ballots		9	0.29	▼0.29
Labour hold				
Labour hold				
Labour hold				

=== Botwell ===
Botwell (2)
Party	Candidate	Votes	%	±%
Labour	Linda Allen	1,556	72.29	▲14.11
Labour	Jon Davey	1,506		
Conservative	Kim Abbott	596	27.71	▼4.39
Conservative	Elizabeth Bryant	577		
Registered electors		4,748		▼539
Turnout		2,288	48.19	▲1.70
Rejected ballots		6	0.26	▲0.02
Labour hold				
Labour hold				

=== Bourne ===
Bourne (2)
Party	Candidate	Votes	%	±%
Labour	John Morse	1,326	46.43	▲3.07
Labour	Norman Nunn-Price	1,288		
Conservative	Shirley Harper	1,162	40.11	▼8.19
Conservative	James O'Neil*	1,095		
Liberal Democrats	Andrew Peach	379	13.46	▲5.12
Registered electors		5,283		▲114
Turnout		2,785	52.72	▼4.10
Rejected ballots		6	0.22	▼0.12
Labour gain from Conservative				
Labour gain from Conservative				

=== Cavendish ===
Cavendish (2)
Party	Candidate	Votes	%	±%
Conservative	Jeremy Bishop	1,290	44.23	▼2.90
Conservative	Keith Morris	1,278		
Liberal Democrats	Richard Bonner	1,044	34.83	▼0.20
Liberal Democrats	Harry Davies	978		
Labour	Douglas Whitehead	610	20.94	▲5.93
Labour	Maureen Crimmins	605		
Registered electors		5,210		▲179
Turnout		3,009	57.75	▼6.11
Rejected ballots		3	0.10	▼0.03
Conservative hold				
Conservative hold				

=== Charville ===
Charville (2)
Party	Candidate	Votes	%	±%
Labour	Michael Craxton*	2,107	53.65	▲4.76
Labour	Philip Berry	2,074		
Labour	Terence Donlevy	2,019		
Conservative	Patrick Cooke*	1,411	34.23	▼16.88
Conservative	Mary O'Connor	1,289		
Conservative	Matthew Fitzpatrick	1,256		
Liberal Democrats	Peter Dollimore	491	12.12	New
Liberal Democrats	John Rout	442		
Registered electors		7,324		▼262
Turnout		3,889	53.10	▲0.96
Rejected ballots		6	0.15	▼0.31
Labour hold				
Labour gain from Conservative				
Labour gain from Conservative				

=== Colham ===
Colham (2)
Party	Candidate	Votes	%	±%
Labour	Brian Hudson*	1,306	52.57	▲3.65
Labour	Shirley Virando	1,124		
Conservative	Betty Buttrum	741	30.33	▼10.15
Conservative	Ian Prince	660		
Liberal Democrats	John Price	395	17.09	▼6.49
Registered electors		4,792		▼116
Turnout		2,337	48.77	▼2.82
Rejected ballots		2	0.09	▲0.01
Labour hold				
Labour hold				

=== Cowley ===
Cowley (3)
Party	Candidate	Votes	%	±%
Labour	Peter James*	1,692	48.88	▲9.08
Labour	David Williams*	1,579		
Labour	Peter Osborne	1,571		
Conservative	Leonard Hyde	1,188	34.52	▼2.95
Conservative	Anthony Boulden	1,144		
Conservative	Paul Babbar	1,087		
Liberal Democrats	Pauline Kent	578	16.60	▲6.63
Liberal Democrats	Andrew Sims	558		
Liberal Democrats	Kevin Pickess	508		
Registered electors		6,956		▲52
Turnout		3,466	49.83	▼5.69
Rejected ballots		0	0.00	▼0.21
Labour hold				
Labour hold				
Labour hold				

=== Crane ===
Crane (2)
Party	Candidate	Votes	%	±%
Labour	Patrick Lyons*	1,582	72.57	▲16.55
Labour	Christopher Mullen	1,514		
Conservative	Derek Baxter	629	27.43	▼5.89
Conservative	Teresa Tilbury	541		
Registered electors		4,794		▼216
Turnout		2,300	47.98	▼2.49
Rejected ballots		18	0.78	▲0.65
Labour hold				
Labour hold				

=== Deansfield ===
Deansfield (2)
Party	Candidate	Votes	%	±%
Labour	Anne O'Shea	1,573	53.32	▲25.68
Labour	David Horne	1,513		
Conservative	Thomas Lackner^{†} (Note: Lackner was a sitting councillor representing the Bourne ward)	1,369	46.68	▲4.89
Conservative	Solveig Stone	1,332		
Registered electors		5,425		▼240
Turnout		3,068	56.55	▼4.88
Rejected ballots		18	0.59	▲0.16
Labour gain from Conservative				
Labour gain from Conservative				

=== Eastcote ===
Eastcote (3)
Party	Candidate	Votes	%	±%
Conservative	Catherine Dann^{†} (Note: Dann was a sitting councillor representing the Cavendish ward)	2,257	58.69	▼13.55
Conservative	David Payne*	2,216		
Conservative	Graham Horn*	2,213		
Liberal Democrats	Stephen Carey	859	21.14	▲10.02
Liberal Democrats	David Marshall	794		
Labour	Sarah Johnson	792	20.17	▲3.53
Labour	Michael Roberts	770		
Liberal Democrats	Garth Underwood	755		
Labour	Geraldine Stroud	737		
Registered electors		7,681		▼129
Turnout		3,934	51.22	▼4.71
Rejected ballots		6	0.15	▲0.01
Conservative hold				
Conservative hold				
Conservative hold				

=== Harefield ===
Harefield (2)
Party	Candidate	Votes	%	±%
Labour	Pauline Crawley* (Note: Crawley replaced Cllr Kenneth Abel after his death in 1993)	1,473	54.49	▲18.76
Labour	Anthony Burles	1,197		
Conservative	Donald Mitchell*	929	36.04	▼5.68
Conservative	Patricia Spargo	836		
Liberal Democrats	Elizabeth Jeffs	246	9.47	▲3.89
Liberal Democrats	Timothy Jeffs	218		
Registered electors		4,875		▼226
Turnout		2,625	53.85	▼5.73
Rejected ballots		2	0.08	▼0.05
Labour gain from Conservative				
Labour hold				

=== Harlington ===
Harlington (3)
Party	Candidate	Votes	%	±%
Labour	Brian Neighbour*	1,816	51.16	▲9.41
Labour	Graham Tomlin^{†} (Note: Tomlin was a sitting councillor representing the Wood End ward)	1,726		
Labour	Marion Way*	1,670		
Liberal Democrats	Anthony Little	1,040	26.16	▲1.67
Liberal Democrats	Carl Neilson	826		
Conservative	Michael Berry	809	22.68	▼11.08
Liberal Democrats	David Webb	799		
Conservative	Marion Howell	790		
Conservative	Michael O'Connor	710		
Registered electors		7,213		▼321
Turnout		3,632	50.35	▲0.18
Rejected ballots		0	0.00	▼0.08
Labour hold				
Labour hold				
Labour hold				

=== Heathrow ===
Heathrow (2)
Party	Candidate	Votes	%	±%
Labour	Philip Kordun^{†} (Note: Kordun was a sitting councillor representing the Colham ward)	1,587	61.23	▲11.35
Labour	Catherine Stocker	1,586		
Conservative	Daniel Banks	834	30.94	▼8.92
Conservative	Jonathan Banks	769		
BNP	Robert Church	203	7.83	New
Registered electors		5,358		▼343
Turnout		2,658	49.61	▲1.97
Rejected ballots		6	0.23	▲0.01
Labour hold				
Labour hold				

=== Hillingdon East ===
Hillingdon East (2)
Party	Candidate	Votes	%	±%
Labour	Leonard Smith^{†} (Note: Smith was a sitting councillor representing the Yeading ward)	1,338	26.69	▼23.19
Independent Labour	Walter Kennedy* (Note: Kennedy was originally nominated for Labour, but was suspended in Mar 1994 based on accusations he made donations to Militant Labour)	1,223	37.02	New
Conservative	Peter Robins	750	22.70	▼17.16
Conservative	Philip Fisher	749		
Liberal Democrats	Jill Rhodes	469	13.59	▲3.33
Liberal Democrats	Patrick Filgate	428		
Labour	Herbert Binding	425		
Registered electors		5,174		▼527
Turnout		2,841	54.91	▲7.27
Rejected ballots		3	0.11	▼0.11
Labour hold				
Independent Labour hold				

=== Hillingdon North ===
Hillingdon North (2)
Party	Candidate	Votes	%	±%
Labour	John Bebbington*	1,261	41.15	▲4.34
Labour	John Lonsdale*	1,234		
Liberal Democrats	Brian Outhwaite	1,089	35.84	▲10.58
Liberal Democrats	Ann-Marie Sharkey	1,085		
Conservative	Ian Taylor	706	23.01	▼10.06
Conservative	Karyn Kenway	690		
Registered electors		5,075		▼285
Turnout		3,147	62.01	▼0.62
Rejected ballots		0	0.00	▼0.21
Labour hold				
Labour hold				

=== Hillingdon West ===
Hillingdon West (3)
Party	Candidate	Votes	%	±%
Conservative	Jane Crease	1,359	43.94	▼6.80
Conservative	Michael Gibson	1,301		
Conservative	Alfred Langley*	1,300		
Labour	John Aldred	1,269	39.08	▲8.83
Labour	Anna Lefort	1,144		
Labour	Patricia Potter	1,110		
Liberal Democrats	David Barker	537	16.98	▲6.78
Liberal Democrats	Eileen Holland	511		
Liberal Democrats	Steven Fisher	481		
Registered electors		7,521		▲140
Turnout		3,170	42.15	▼2.65
Rejected ballots		0	0.00	▼0.06
Conservative hold				
Conservative hold				
Conservative hold				

=== Ickenham ===
Ickenham (3)
Party	Candidate	Votes	%	±%
Conservative	Richard Barnes*	2,767	59.38	▼5.73
Conservative	Mavis Knight*	2,753		
Conservative	Neil Sherry	2,677		
Labour	Linda Buckingham	1,031	21.75	▲4.31
Labour	John Buckingham	996		
Labour	David Bell	976		
Liberal Democrats	Mary Outhwaite	902	18.87	▲11.01
Liberal Democrats	Bruce Routledge	879		
Liberal Democrats	Alison Rudin	824		
Registered electors		8,672		▼228
Turnout		4,794	55.28	▼3.64
Rejected ballots		0	0.00	▼0.15
Conservative hold				
Conservative hold				
Conservative hold				

=== Manor ===
Manor (2)
Party	Candidate	Votes	%	±%
Conservative	Edwin Hales*	1,306	46.38	▼9.03
Conservative	David Yarrow*	1,292		
Labour	Roy Murray	838	29.13	▲6.95
Labour	Robert Nunn	793		
Liberal Democrats	Derek Honeygold	704	24.49	▲2.08
Liberal Democrats	Kim Mathen	667		
Registered electors		5,390		▼139
Turnout		2,899	53.78	▼3.63
Rejected ballots		12	0.41	▲0.28
Conservative hold				
Conservative hold				

=== Northwood ===
Northwood (3)
Party	Candidate	Votes	%	±%
Conservative	Frank Taylor*	2,093	66.67	▼3.40
Conservative	Jonathan Bianco*	2,082		
Conservative	Albert Kanjee*	1,952		
Liberal Democrats	Jane Woodnutt	596	18.74	▲8.99
Liberal Democrats	Norma Dawlings	587		
Liberal Democrats	Melanie Winterbotham	539		
Labour	Gilbert Greenall	458	14.59	▼1.86
Labour	Margaret Bartlett	454		
Labour	Bernard Gauntlett	430		
Registered electors		7,186		▼75
Turnout		3,215	44.74	▼4.91
Rejected ballots		5	0.16	▼0.01
Conservative hold				
Conservative hold				
Conservative hold				

=== Northwood Hills ===
Northwood Hills (3)
Party	Candidate	Votes	%	±%
Conservative	David Bishop* (Note: Bishop replaced Cllr Graham Sewell after his resignation in 1990)	1,828	51.88	▼6.91
Conservative	Susan James	1,788		
Conservative	Andrew Retter*	1,763		
Labour	Ruth Allan	1,069	28.70	▲0.04
Labour	James McGurk	954		
Labour	Barbara Evans	952		
Liberal Democrats	Keith Baker	709	19.42	▲6.87
Liberal Democrats	Mary Butcher	655		
Liberal Democrats	Leislie Butcher	650		
Registered electors		7,353		▼41
Turnout		3,618	49.20	▼2.13
Rejected ballots		5	0.14	▼0.04
Conservative hold				
Conservative hold				
Conservative hold				

=== Ruislip ===
Ruislip (2)
Party	Candidate	Votes	%	±%
Conservative	Michael Kilbey*	1,558	53.35	▼16.93
Conservative	Maurice Lancaster^{†} (Note: Lancaster was a sitting councillor representing the Deansfield ward)	1,479		
Liberal Democrats	Michael Cox	779	26.10	▲14.74
Liberal Democrats	Stuart Laycock	706		
Labour	Clifford Barton	595	20.55	▼2.19
Labour	David Herriott	574		
Registered electors		5,548		▼75
Turnout		2,944	53.06	▼3.12
Rejected ballots		4	0.14	▲0.05
Conservative hold				
Conservative hold				

=== St Martins ===
St Martins (2)
Party	Candidate	Votes	%	±%
Conservative	Philip Corthorne* (Note: Corthone replaced Cllr Derek Tow after his death in 1993)	1,631	53.92	▼11.27
Conservative	Douglas Mills*	1,573		
Labour	Alan Howard	917	29.72	▲6.73
Labour	Trevor Richards	848		
Liberal Democrats	Hilary Leighter	506	16.36	▲4.54
Liberal Democrats	Neville Parsonage	466		
Registered electors		5,804		▼197
Turnout		3,053	52.60	▼1.17
Rejected ballots		5	0.16	▲0.07
Conservative hold				
Conservative hold				

=== Townfield ===
Townfield (3)
Party	Candidate	Votes	%	±%
Labour	Chris Rogers	2,614	69.34	▲4.40
Labour	Christine Saunders*	2,547		
Labour	Dalip Chand	2,465		
Conservative	Kelly Armstrong	1,217	30.66	▼4.40
Conservative	Valerie Hannington	1,089		
Conservative	Robert Taylor	1,067		
Registered electors		8,022		▼287
Turnout		4,041	50.37	▲2.60
Rejected ballots		20	0.49	▲0.14
Labour hold				
Labour hold				
Labour hold				

=== Uxbridge North ===
Uxbridge North (2)
Party	Candidate	Votes	%	±%
Conservative	George Cooper*	1,409	52.54	▼11.84
Conservative	Michael Heywood	1,346		
Labour	Moira Spink	694	26.38	▲3.05
Labour	Sean McWhinnie	689		
Liberal Democrats	Rosemary Gill	608	21.08	▲8.79
Liberal Democrats	James Sims	497		
Registered electors		4,887		▼162
Turnout		2,635	53.92	▼0.55
Rejected ballots		8	0.30	▲0.30
Conservative hold				
Conservative hold				

=== Uxbridge South ===
Uxbridge South (2)
Party	Candidate	Votes	%	±%
Labour	Paul Baker	1,248	61.09	▲15.83
Labour	Michael Nash*	1,203		
Conservative	Eileen Barrett	581	25.56	▼5.45
Conservative	Nilesh Parekh	444		
Liberal Democrats	Andrew Vernazza	268	13.35	▲4.12
Registered electors		4,083		▼163
Turnout		2,065	50.58	▼2.41
Rejected ballots		3	0.15	▲0.02
Labour hold				
Labour hold				

=== West Drayton ===
West Drayton (2)
Party	Candidate	Votes	%	±%
Labour	Dorothy Blundell	1,250	46.58	▲9.48
Labour	Martin McGrath	1,189		
Conservative	Kevin Brookes*	1,008	38.14	▼10.76
Conservative	Norman Hawkins*	990		
Liberal Democrats	Iain Campbell	412	15.27	▲8.49
Liberal Democrats	Kay Hooker	388		
Registered electors		5,191		▼366
Turnout		2,713	52.26	▼2.81
Rejected ballots		5	0.18	▲0.08
Labour gain from Conservative				
Labour gain from Conservative				

=== Wood End ===
Wood End (2)
Party	Candidate	Votes	%	±%
Labour	Janet Gardner	1,584	61.18	▲5.95
Labour	Peter Ryerson*	1,458		
Conservative	Albert Tyrrell	688	25.95	▼10.09
Conservative	Douglas Whitehead	602		
Liberal Democrats	Beryl Bell	320	12.87	▲4.14
Registered electors		4,901		▼218
Turnout		2,504	51.09	▲1.61
Rejected ballots		6	0.24	▲0.20
Labour hold				
Labour hold				

=== Yeading ===
Yeading (3)
Party	Candidate	Votes	%	±%
Labour	Julia Leonard	1,912	64.90	▲8.77
Labour	Anthony Way	1,802		
Labour	Steve Panayi*	1,781		
Conservative	Raymond Green	998	35.10	▼8.77
Conservative	Paul Bavington	990		
Conservative	Bruce Howell	984		
Registered electors		6,558		▲33
Turnout		3,106	47.36	▼0.04
Rejected ballots		20	0.64	▲0.15
Labour hold				
Labour hold				
Labour hold				

=== Yiewsley ===
Yiewsley (2)
Party	Candidate	Votes	%	±%
Labour	Paul Harmsworth*	1,561	65.43	▲16.89
Labour	Karen Livney^{†} (Note: Livney was a sitting councillor representing the Uxbridge South ward after she replaced Cllr Gordon Bogan following his death in 1991)	1,501		
Conservative	Ann Banks	817	34.57	▼3.46
Conservative	Michael Bull	801		
Registered electors		5,270		▼173
Turnout		2,504	47.51	▼2.37
Rejected ballots		13	0.52	▲0.45
Labour hold				
Labour hold				
