= Ruislip, Northwood and Pinner =

UK Parliament constituency (since 2010)

Coordinates: 51.60°N 0.45°W

- Borough constituency for the House of Commons
- Interactive map of boundaries from 2024
- Location within Greater London
- County: Greater London
- Electorate: 72,168 (March 2020)
- Major settlements: Ruislip, Northwood, Pinner, Harefield, Eastcote, Hatch End

Current constituency
- Created: 2010
- Member of Parliament: David Simmonds (Conservative)
- Seats: One
- Created from: Ruislip-Northwood, Harrow West

Ruislip, Northwood and Pinner is a constituency (Note: A borough constituency (for the purposes of election expenses and type of returning officer)) in Greater London represented in the House of Commons of the UK Parliament since 2019 by David Simmonds, a Conservative. (Note: As with all constituencies, the constituency elects one Member of Parliament (MP) by the first past the post system of election at least every five years.)

== Constituency profile ==
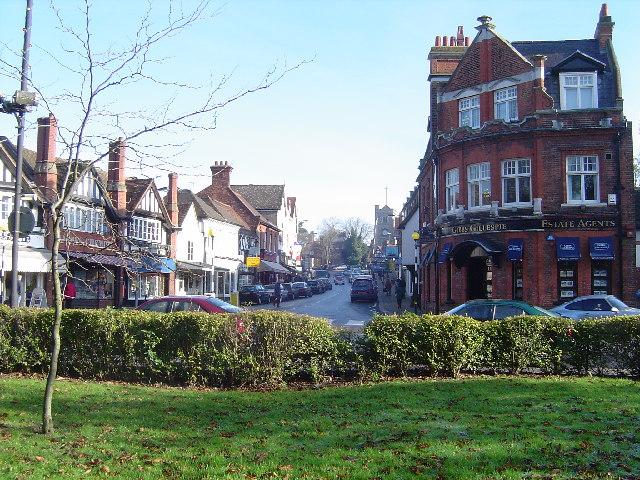
High Street, Pinner

Ruislip, Northwood and Pinner is a constituency in Greater London in England, covering parts of the boroughs of Hillingdon and Harrow. It includes the suburbs of Ruislip, Northwood and Pinner and the outlying village of Harefield.

This constituency covers suburbs and villages on the outer fringes of London, around 14 miles (23 km) north-west of the city centre. The area consists of highly-affluent suburban neighbourhoods developed during the interwar period, nicknamed Metro-land after the Metropolitan Railway (now the London Underground's Metropolitan line) which serves the area. Most residents live in large detached or semi-detached homes and the average house price is double the UK average; in 2021, Northwood was named by the Office for National Statistics as the place with the most expensive properties in the UK.

Ruislip, Northwood and Pinner has above-average populations of middle-aged adults and retirees and a low proportion of young adults. Residents have high levels of income and homeownership and the child poverty rate is very low. They are generally well-educated and a high proportion work in the health and education sectors. The percentage of residents claiming unemployment benefits is low.

The constituency is ethnically diverse. White people made up 55% of the population at the 2021 census, around one-fifth of whom were of non-British origin including large Irish and Romanian communities. Asians, mostly of Indian origin, were the largest ethnic minority group at 32%. They were mostly concentrated in Pinner where they made up just under half the population.

At the local borough council level, all seats in this constituency are represented by Conservative councillors. An estimated 53% of voters in Ruislip, Northwood and Pinner supported remaining in the European Union in the 2016 referendum, higher than the UK-wide figure of 48%.

== History ==
Parliament accepted the Boundary Commission's fifth periodic review of Westminster constituencies and created this constituency for General Election 2010. In this election it was won by the previous member for Ruislip, Northwood.

Predecessor seat

This seat is at its core the successor to Ruislip-Northwood which had an unbroken history as a Conservative safe seat with non-marginal majorities running from its 1950 creation. This Conservative success was only bolstered by the addition of generally highly Conservative, highly affluent Pinner in 2010.

Political history

The 2015 result was greater than the previous majority, having seen a major fall in the vote of the Liberal Democrats, of 11.7% less than national swing against the party of 15.7%, and made the seat the 57th safest of the Conservative Party's 331 seats by percentage of majority. Since 2015, the Conservative vote share has been slowly declining, while the Liberal Democrat and Labour vote share has been steadily rising.

== Boundaries ==
Map of boundaries 2010-2024

=== 2010–2024 ===
Following their 2007 review of parliamentary representation in North London, the Boundary Commission for England created the new seat of Ruislip, Northwood and Pinner to deal with population changes. It included parts of the Harrow West constituency and much of the former Ruislip-Northwood constituency.

This constituency had electoral wards:

- Eastcote and East Ruislip, Harefield, Ickenham, Northwood; Northwood Hills, West Ruislip in the London Borough of Hillingdon
- Hatch End, Pinner, Pinner South in the London Borough of Harrow

The only other three-place constituency name in England at the time was Normanton, Pontefract, and Castleford in Yorkshire.

=== Current ===
Further to the 2023 review of Westminster constituencies, which came into effect for the 2024 general election, the constituency is composed of:

- The London Borough of Harrow wards of: Hatch End; Pinner; Pinner South.
- The London Borough of Hillingdon wards of: Eastcote; Harefield Village; Northwood; Northwood Hills; Ruislip.

The Borough of Hillingdon ward of Ickenham and South Harefield was transferred to Uxbridge and South Ruislip, partly offset by minor expansions into neighbouring seats as a result of ward boundary changes.

== Members of Parliament ==
Election	Member	Party
2010	Nick Hurd	Conservative
2019	David Simmonds	Conservative

== Elections ==
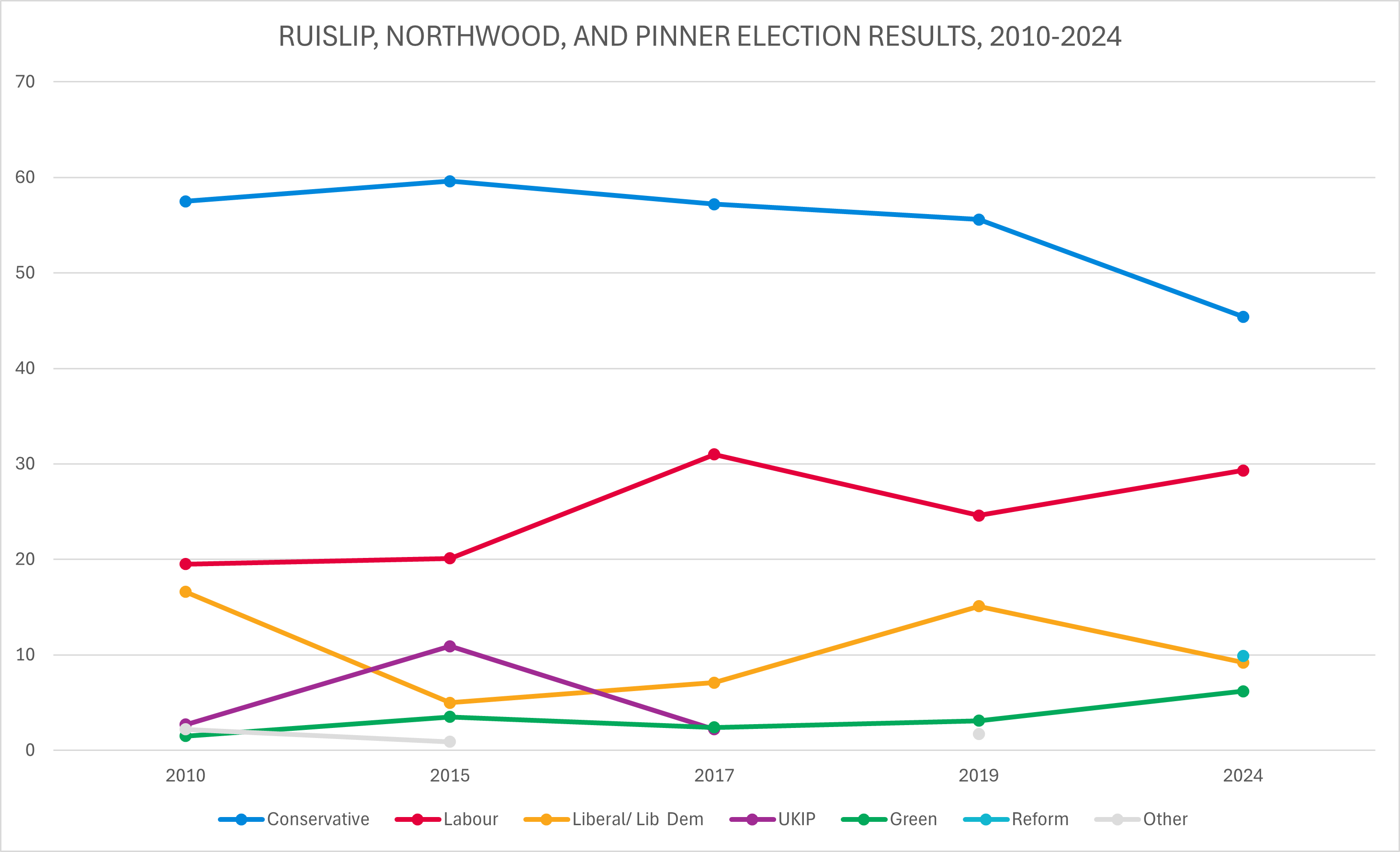
Election results 2010–2024

=== Elections in the 2020s ===
General election 2024: Ruislip, Northwood and Pinner
Party	Candidate	Votes	%	±%
Conservative	David Simmonds	21,366	45.4	−9.9
Labour	Tony Gill	13,785	29.3	+4.2
Reform	Ian Price	4,671	9.9	+9.8
Liberal Democrats	Jonathan Banks	4,343	9.2	−6.0
Green	Jess Lee	2,926	6.2	+3.6
Majority		7,581	16.1	−14.9
Turnout		47,091	65.7	−6.7
Registered electors		71,683		
Conservative hold		Swing	−7.1	

=== Elections in the 2010s ===
2019 notional result
Party	Vote	%
Conservative	28,916	55.3
Labour	13,106	25.1
Liberal Democrats	7,920	15.2
Green	1,381	2.6
Others	884	1.7
Brexit Party	49	0.1
Turnout	52,256	72.4
Electorate	72,168	

General election 2019: Ruislip, Northwood and Pinner
Party	Candidate	Votes	%	±%
Conservative	David Simmonds	29,391	55.6	−1.6
Labour	Peymana Assad	12,997	24.6	−6.4
Liberal Democrats	Jonathan Banks	7,986	15.1	+8.0
Green	Sarah Green	1,646	3.1	+0.7
Animal Welfare	Femy Amin	325	0.6	N/A
Independent	Tracy Blackwell	295	0.6	N/A
Independent	Julian Wilson	264	0.5	N/A
Majority		16,394	31.0	+4.8
Turnout		52,904	72.1	−0.6
Registered electors		73,389		
Conservative hold		Swing	+2.4	

General election 2017: Ruislip, Northwood and Pinner
Party	Candidate	Votes	%	±%
Conservative	Nick Hurd	30,555	57.2	−2.4
Labour	Rebecca Lury	16,575	31.0	+10.9
Liberal Democrats	Alexander Cunliffe	3,813	7.1	+2.1
Green	Sarah Green	1,268	2.4	−1.1
UKIP	Richard Braine	1,171	2.2	−8.7
Majority		13,980	26.2	−13.3
Turnout		53,382	72.7	+2.7
Registered electors		73,427		
Conservative hold		Swing	−6.6	

General election 2015: Ruislip, Northwood and Pinner
Party	Candidate	Votes	%	±%
Conservative	Nick Hurd	30,521	59.6	+2.1
Labour	Michael Borio	10,297	20.1	+0.6
UKIP	Gerard Barry	5,598	10.9	+8.2
Liberal Democrats	Josh Dixon	2,537	5.0	−11.6
Green	Karen Pillai	1,801	3.5	+2.0
TUSC	Wally Kennedy	302	0.6	N/A
National Liberal	Sockalingam Yogalingam	166	0.3	N/A
Majority		20,224	39.5	+1.5
Turnout		51,222	70.0	−0.8
Registered electors		73,216		
Conservative hold		Swing	+0.7	

General election 2010: Ruislip, Northwood and Pinner
Party	Candidate	Votes	%	±%
Conservative	Nick Hurd*	28,866	57.5	
Labour	Anita McDonald	9,806	19.5	
Liberal Democrats	Thomas Papworth	8,345	16.6	
UKIP	Jason Pontey	1,351	2.7	
National Front	Ian Edward	899	1.8	
Green	Graham Lee	740	1.5	
Christian	Ruby Akhtar	198	0.4	
Majority		19,060	38.0	
Turnout		50,205	70.8	
Registered electors		70,783		
Conservative win (new seat)				

* Served as an MP in the 2005–2010 Parliament

== See also ==
- Parliamentary constituencies in London
