= David Simmonds =

British politician

David Simmonds CBE MP
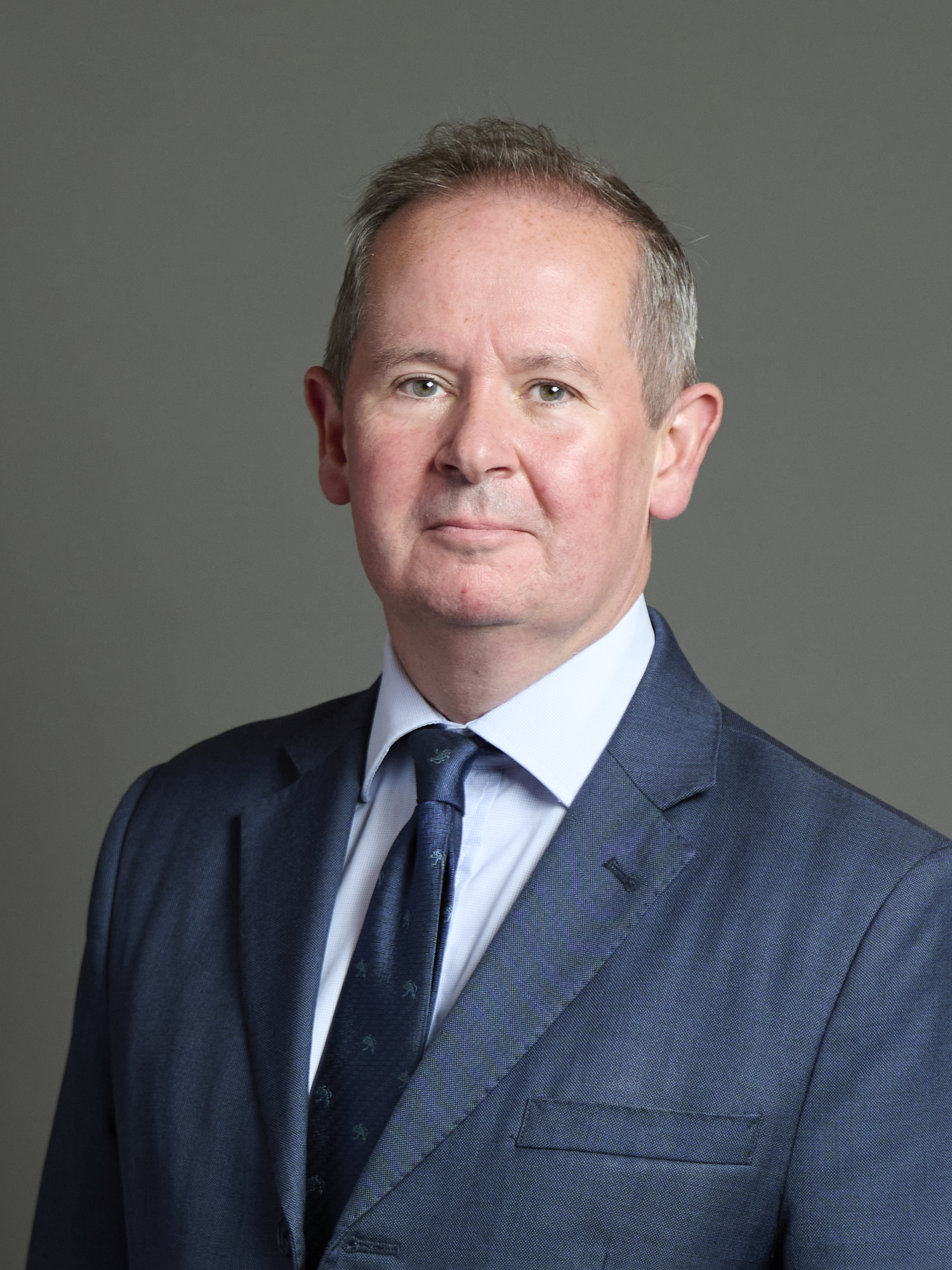
- Official portrait, 2024

Shadow Minister for Levelling Up, Housing and Communities Shadow Parliamentary Under-Secretary for Housing, Communities and Local Government (July–November 2024)
- Incumbent
- Assumed office 19 July 2024
- Leader: Rishi Sunak; Kemi Badenoch
- Preceded by: Position established

Senior Opposition Whip
- Incumbent
- Assumed office 19 July 2024
- Leader: Rishi Sunak; Kemi Badenoch

Member of Parliament for Ruislip, Northwood and Pinner
- Incumbent
- Assumed office 12 December 2019
- Preceded by: Nick Hurd
- Majority: 7,581 (16.1%)

Member of Hillingdon London Borough Council for Ickenham ward
- In office 2 May 2002 – 5 May 2022
- Succeeded by: Ward abolished

Member of Hillingdon London Borough Council for Cowley ward
- In office 7 May 1998 – 2 May 2002
- Succeeded by: Ward abolished

Personal details
- Born: David Timothy Simmonds; February 1976 (age 50) Canterbury, Kent, England
- Party: Conservative
- Children: 2
- Education: Durham University (BA Hons); Birkbeck, University of London (PGC)
- Website: Official website

David Timothy Simmonds CBE (born February 1976) is a British Conservative Party politician who has served as the Member of Parliament (MP) for Ruislip, Northwood and Pinner since 2019. He has served as a junior Shadow MHCLG minister and as a Senior Opposition Whip since July 2024. Simmonds was formerly a councillor on Hillingdon London Borough Council, having served from 1998 to 2022.

== Early life and career ==
David Timothy Simmonds was born in Canterbury in February 1976, the son of Rory and Veronica Simmonds. He attended Cardinal Newman RC School in Pontypridd, before going to Grey College, University of Durham, where he gained a BA. Simmonds gained a Postgraduate Certificate at Birkbeck College, University of London, and a Financial Planning Certificate from the Chartered Institute of Insurers (CII). His professional background is in financial services, where he worked for several high street banks after qualifying with the CII in 1997. He was a non-executive director at NHS Hillingdon.

== Political career ==
Simmonds was elected as a Conservative councillor for the London Borough of Hillingdon in 1998, winning his seat in Cowley from the Labour Party. From 2002 to 2022, he represented the borough's Ickenham ward.

He has served in hung and majority administrations as a committee chairman and Cabinet Member, with responsibilities including planning, housing, social services, education and children's services. He led work for the Local Government Association in a number of high-profile areas including children's services, education, immigration and Brexit, serving as Conservative Group Leader and Deputy Chairman of the organisation representing councils. Simmonds was also Chairman of the Children and Young People Board from 2011 to 2015.

His previous public service includes as Chairman of the National Employer's Organisation for Schoolteachers (NEOST) and of the European Federation of Education Employers (EFEE), as an active member of the Committee of the Regions and leader of the UK Conservative delegation there, and at the Congress of the Council of Europe.

He is known for his work on refugee children and led the implementation of the Vulnerable Persons Relocation Scheme (VPRS) with then-Home Secretary Theresa May to resettle vulnerable refugees to areas of the UK volunteering to take them in.

He served as Deputy Chairman and previously Treasurer of the Conservative Councillors Association, and served as an associate non-executive director in his local NHS and as a magistrate in North-West London. He stepped down as Deputy Leader of Hillingdon Council and as Deputy Chairman of the LGA following his election to Parliament. He was Deputy Leader of the council from 2002 to 2020, and Deputy Chairman of the LGA from 2015 to 2020.

== Parliamentary career ==
At the 2001 general election, Simmonds stood as the Conservative candidate in Caerphilly, coming third with 11.4% of the vote behind the Labour candidate Wayne David and the Plaid Cymru candidate Lindsay Whittle.

At the 2005 general election, he stood in Erewash, coming second with 30.4% of the vote behind the incumbent Labour MP Liz Blackman.

Simmonds was elected to Parliament as MP for Ruislip, Northwood and Pinner at the 2019 general election with 55.6% of the vote and a majority of 16,394. Simmonds is the Chair of the All-Party Parliamentary Group on Migration, the APPG on Housing and Planning, the APPG for Social Workers, and the APPG for Airport Communities.

On 7 July 2022, Simmonds was elected to the executive of the 1922 Committee of backbench Conservative MPs.

In February 2023, Simmonds was re-selected as the Conservative candidate for Ruislip, Northwood and Pinner at the 2024 general election.

== Honours ==
He was awarded a CBE in the 2015 Birthday Honours list.

== Personal life ==
Simmonds is married and has two children. He lists his recreations as travelling in Europe, wine and modern British prints.

Parliament of the United Kingdom
Preceded by Nick Hurd	Member of Parliament for Ruislip, Northwood and Pinner; 2019–present	Incumbent
