= 2022 Hillingdon London Borough Council election =

2022 local election in Hillingdon

2022 Hillingdon Council election
- 5 May 2022

All 53 council seats
	First party	Second party
Leader	Ian Edwards	Peter Curling
Party	Conservative	Labour
Last election	44 seats, 54.2%	21 seats, 38.5%
Seats won	30	23
- Map of the results of the 2022 Hillingdon London Borough Council election. Conservatives in blue, Labour in red.
council control before election
Conservative
Subsequent council control
TBD

The 2022 Hillingdon London Borough Council election took place on 5 May 2022. All 53 members of Hillingdon London Borough Council were elected. The elections took place alongside local elections in the other London boroughs and elections to local authorities across the United Kingdom.

In the previous election in 2018, the Conservative Party maintained its control of the council, winning 44 out of the 65 seats with the Labour Party as the council opposition with the remaining 21 seats. The 2022 election took place under new election boundaries, which reduced the number of councillors to 53. The Conservatives maintained control despite losing 4 seats to the Labour Party.

== Background ==
=== History ===
Result of the 2018 borough election

The thirty-two London boroughs were established in 1965 by the London Government Act 1963. They are the principal authorities in Greater London and have responsibilities including education, housing, planning, highways, social services, libraries, recreation, waste, environmental health and revenue collection. Some of the powers are shared with the Greater London Authority, which also manages passenger transport, police, and fire.

Hillingdon has been under Conservative control, Labour control and no overall control since its establishment. The Conservatives have held control since the 2006 election, when they won 45 seats with 47.0% of the vote to Labour's 18 seats on 24.4% of the vote and the Liberal Democrats' 2 seats with 20.5% of the vote. The Liberal Democrats lost their representation on the council in 2010 and did not regain it in the subsequent council elections in 2014 or 2018. In the most recent election in 2018, the Conservatives won 44 seats with 54.2% of the vote while Labour won 21 seats with 38.5% of the vote. Among the other parties, the Green Party performed best with 4.9% of the vote across the borough. The incumbent council leader was reselected after the 2018 election, Ray Puddifoot, who had led the Conservative group since 2000.

=== Council term ===
A Conservative councillor for Hillingdon East, Pat Jackson, resigned in early 2020. A by-election to replace her was held on 27 February 2020, which was held for the Conservatives by Colleen Sullivan with a large swing from Labour. A Conservative councillor for Charville ward, Neil Fyfe, died in November 2020. He had represented the ward since 2010. Due to the COVID-19 pandemic, the by-election to fill his seat wasn't held until 6 May 2021 alongside the 2021 London mayoral election and London Assembly election. The seat was held for the Conservatives by Darran Davies, with the Labour candidate coming second. Puddifoot stood down as council leader in January, and was replaced by the Conservative councillor and former Metropolitan Police commander Ian Edwards.

Along with most London boroughs, Hillingdon will be electing councillors under new ward boundaries in 2022. Following local consultation, the Local Government Boundary Commission for England produced new boundaries reducing the number of councillors from 65 to 53 across twelve three-councillor wards with eight two-seat wards and one single-seat ward.

== Electoral process ==
Hillingdon, as with all other London borough councils, elects all of its councillors at once every four years, with the previous election having taken place in 2018. The election took place by multi-member first-past-the-post voting, with each ward being represented by one, two or three councillors. Electors had as many votes as there are councillors to be elected in their ward, with the top two or three being elected.

All registered electors (British, Irish, Commonwealth and European Union citizens) living in London aged 18 or over were entitled to vote in the election. People who live at two addresses in different councils, such as university students with different term-time and holiday addresses, were entitled to be registered for and vote in elections in both local authorities. Voting in-person at polling stations took place from 7:00 to 22:00 on election day, and voters were able to apply for postal votes or proxy votes in advance of the election.

== Campaign ==
The Conservative peer Robert Hayward listed Hillingdon as one of four councils his party risked losing control of in London following the partygate scandal. Labour had been expected to make gains in the borough in the 2018 election, but had fallen back. The borough includes the then prime minister Boris Johnson's constituency, Uxbridge and South Ruislip, which a January poll suggested he would be at risk of losing in the event of a general election.

== Previous council composition ==
Councillors after the 2018 election

Councillors prior to the 2022 election

After 2018 election		Before 2022 election	
Party	Seats	Party	Seats
Conservative	44	Conservative	44 (new boundaries - 34)
Labour	21	Labour	21 (new boundaries - 19)

== Results summary ==
2022 Hillingdon London Borough Council election
Party	Seats	Gains	Losses	Net gain/loss	Seats %	Votes %	Votes	+/−
Conservative	30	0	3	▼3	56.6	48.2	85,819	-6.0
Labour	23	3	0	▲3	43.4	41.5	73,926	+3.0
Green	0	0	0	Steady	0.0	7.6	13,524	+2.7
Liberal Democrats	0	0	0	Steady	0.0	1.7	2,963	+0.1
TUSC	0	0	0	Steady	0.0	0.3	492	New
Independent	0	0	0	Steady	0.0	0.2	298	-0.3
SDP	0	0	0	Steady	0.0	0.2	293	New
NHA	0	0	0	Steady	0.0	0.1	219	New
Let London Live	0	0	0	Steady	0.0	0.1	212	New
UKIP	0	0	0	Steady	0.0	0.1	199	New
Total	53						177,945	

== Ward results ==
Statements of persons nominated were published on 6 April

=== Belmore ===
Belmore (3)
Party	Candidate	Votes	%	±%
Labour	Labina Basit	2,421	70.7	
Labour	Jagjit Singh	2,421	70.7	
Labour	Narinder Garg	2,368	69.2	
Conservative	Cameron Bell	923	27.0	
Conservative	John Morgan	824	24.1	
Conservative	Isobel Rodrigues	795	23.2	
Green	Katherine Lee	268	7.8	
Green	Andrew Gibbs	252	7.4	
Turnout		3,424	34.64	
Labour win (new seat)				
Labour win (new seat)				
Labour win (new seat)				

=== Charville ===
Charville (2)
Party	Candidate	Votes	%	±%
Labour	Barry Nelson-West	1,481	51.8	
Conservative	Darran Davies	1,447	50.6	
Labour	Sumen Starr	1,398	48.9	
Conservative	Teji Barnes	1,396	48.8	
Turnout		2,861	38.71	
Labour gain from Conservative				
Conservative hold				

=== Colham and Cowley ===
Colham & Cowley (3)
Party	Candidate	Votes	%	±%
Conservative	Shehyrar Ahmad-Wallana	1,851	50.2	
Conservative	Roy Chamdal	1,822	49.4	
Conservative	Ekta Gohil	1,702	46.1	
Labour	Tony Eginton	1,572	42.6	
Labour	Steve Garelick	1,455	39.5	
Labour	Karina Jogart	1,394	37.8	
Green	Nicole Crook	296	8.0	
Green	Valerie McDonnell	289	7.8	
Green	Lucy West	266	7.2	
NHA	Alastair Fischer	219	5.9	
UKIP	Geoff Courtenay	199	5.4	
Turnout		3,688	36.5	
Conservative win (new seat)				
Conservative win (new seat)				
Conservative win (new seat)				

=== Eastcote ===
Eastcote (3)
Party	Candidate	Votes	%	±%
Conservative	Nick Denys	3,396	65.4	
Conservative	Becky Haggar	3,272	63.1	
Conservative	Ian Edwards	3,227	62.2	
Labour	David Keys	1,256	24.2	
Labour	Robert Cowlin	1,201	23.1	
Labour	Joanne Tapper	1,190	22.9	
Green	Rachel Ross	611	11.8	
Liberal Democrats	Tom Cottew	542	10.4	
Green	Andrew Kennedy	495	9.5	
Green	David Stephens	304	5.9	
TUSC	Tim Henry	72	1.4	
Turnout		5,189	42.1	
Conservative win (new seat)				
Conservative win (new seat)				
Conservative win (new seat)				

=== Harefield Village ===
Harefield Village (1)
Party	Candidate	Votes	%	±%
Conservative	Jane Palmer	929	56.9	
Green	Niki Samuel	524	32.1	
Labour	Mohinder Birah	179	11.0	
Majority				
Turnout			39.95	
Conservative win (new seat)				

=== Hayes Town ===
Hayes Town (3)
Party	Candidate	Votes	%	±%
Labour	Peter Curling	1,906	78.5	
Labour	Janet Gardner	1,844	75.9	
Labour	Raju Sansurpuri	1,812	74.6	
Conservative	Lauren Davies	593	24.4	
Conservative	Taf Sowe	463	19.1	
Conservative	Tristan Pahl	454	18.7	
Let London Live	Hazel Gillender	212	8.7	
Turnout		2,428	28.3	
Labour win (new seat)				
Labour win (new seat)				
Labour win (new seat)				

=== Heathrow Villages ===
Heathrow Villages (2)
Party	Candidate	Votes	%	±%
Labour	June Nelson	1,336	55.5	
Labour	Peter Money	1,274	53.0	
Conservative	Christine Taylor	943	39.2	
Conservative	Daniel Sydenham	886	36.8	
Green	Alice Greenham	227	9.4	
Green	Zahid Khan	146	6.1	
Turnout		2,406	29.6	
Labour hold				
Labour hold				

=== Hillingdon East ===
Hillingdon East (3)
Party	Candidate	Votes	%	±%
Conservative	Colleen Sullivan	2,104	61.6	
Conservative	Wayne Bridges	2,097	61.4	
Conservative	Alan Chapman	2,066	60.5	
Labour	Jagdeep Singh Brar	1,311	38.4	
Labour	Gregory Goonesekera	1,231	36.1	
Labour	Gurmeet Singh Virk	1,194	35.0	
SDP	Stephen Gardner	239	7.0	
Turnout		3,414	31.8	
Conservative hold				
Conservative hold				
Conservative hold				

=== Hillingdon West ===
Hillingdon West (2)
Party	Candidate	Votes	%	±%
Conservative	Adam Bennett	1,124	57.3	
Conservative	Reeta Chamdal	1,014	51.7	
Labour	Margaret McDonald	704	35.9	
Labour	Ray Meen	688	35.0	
Green	Christine Pratt	213	10.9	
Green	David Allam	184	9.4	
Turnout		1,963	31.6	
Conservative win (new seat)				
Conservative win (new seat)				

=== Ickenham and South Harefield ===
Ickenham & South Harefield (3)
Party	Candidate	Votes	%	±%
Conservative	Martin Goddard	2,734	58.1	
Conservative	Eddie Lavery	2,681	57.0	
Conservative	Kaushik Banerjee	2,537	53.9	
Green	Sarah Green	1,246	26.5	
Labour	John Campbell	1,111	23.6	
Green	Rose-Marie Adams	1,061	22.5	
Labour	Paul Espley	997	21.2	
Labour	Kevin McDonald	938	19.9	
Green	Zena Wigram	817	17.4	
Turnout		4,707	41.2	
Conservative win (new seat)				
Conservative win (new seat)				
Conservative win (new seat)				

=== Northwood ===
Northwood (2)
Party	Candidate	Votes	%	±%
Conservative	Henry Higgins	1,823	61.9	
Conservative	Richard Lewis	1,783	60.5	
Labour	Jonathan Hutchins	630	21.4	
Liberal Democrats	Jonathan Banks	557	18.9	
Liberal Democrats	David Miller	455	15.4	
Green	Fiona Holding	288	9.8	
Labour	John Oswell	186	6.3	
Green	Scott Miles	170	5.8	
Turnout		2,946	38.5	
Conservative hold				
Conservative hold				

=== Northwood Hills ===
Northwood Hills (2)
Party	Candidate	Votes	%	±%
Conservative	Jonathan Bianco	1,686	59.2	
Conservative	Kishan Bhatt	1,627	57.1	
Labour	Kerri Prince	754	26.5	
Labour	Shabbar Sachedina	640	22.5	
Liberal Democrats	Peter Dollimore	359	12.6	
Green	Stephen Edmeads	319	11.2	
Green	Andrew Ross	310	10.9	
Turnout		2,847	35.4	
Conservative hold				
Conservative hold				

=== Pinkwell ===
Pinkwell (3)
Party	Candidate	Votes	%	±%
Labour	Tony Gill	2,314	80.0	
Labour	Kuldeep Lakhmana	2,214	76.5	
Labour	Gursharan Mand	2,154	74.5	
Conservative	Rosie Giddings	692	23.9	
Conservative	Darren Upjohn	669	23.1	
Conservative	Allan Kauffman	635	21.9	
Turnout		2,893	29.32	
Labour hold				
Labour hold				
Labour hold				

=== Ruislip ===
Ruislip (3)
Party	Candidate	Votes	%	±%
Conservative	Philip Corthorne	3,242	69.0	
Conservative	John Riley	3,115	66.3	
Conservative	Peter Smallwood	3,103	66.0	
Labour	John Morse	986	21.0	
Labour	Jane Smith	892	19.0	
Labour	Andrew Smith	808	17.2	
Green	Andrew Blakie	625	13.3	
Liberal Democrats	Alexander Cunliffe	546	11.6	
Green	Shivalee Patel	411	8.7	
Green	Jaishiva Virdee	374	8.0	
Turnout		4,701	41.8	
Conservative win (new seat)				
Conservative win (new seat)				
Conservative win (new seat)				

=== Ruislip Manor ===
Ruislip Manor (2)
Party	Candidate	Votes	%	±%
Conservative	Susan O' Brien	1,976	62.7	
Conservative	Douglas Mills	1,951	61.9	
Labour	Norrette Moore	806	25.6	
Labour	Roshan Ghei	782	24.8	
Green	Graham Lee	291	9.2	
Liberal Democrats	Melanie Winterbotham	268	8.5	
Green	Geoffrey Wilkinson	228	7.2	
Turnout		3,151	41.6	
Conservative win (new seat)				
Conservative win (new seat)				

=== South Ruislip ===
South Ruislip (3)
Party	Candidate	Votes	%	±%
Conservative	Richard Mills	2,373	60.1	
Conservative	Steve Tuckwell	2,356	59.7	
Conservative	Heena Makwana	2,343	59.4	
Labour	Connor Liberty	1,195	30.3	
Labour	Alexander Sim	1,176	29.8	
Labour	Mohan Sharma	1,077	27.3	
Green	Sandra Baynton	385	9.8	
Green	Deborah Howes	365	9.2	
Independent	Tiffany Rytter	298	7.6	
Green	Peter Crook	271	6.9	
Turnout		3,946	35.9	
Conservative hold				
Conservative hold				
Conservative hold				

=== Uxbridge ===
Uxbridge (3)
Party	Candidate	Votes	%	±%
Conservative	Keith Burrows	1,971	51.1	
Labour	Tony Burles	1,764	45.7	
Conservative	Farhad Choubedar	1,740	45.1	
Conservative	Ranjeet Singh Rathore	1,719	44.6	
Labour	Jagdip Singh Gill	1,575	40.8	
Labour	Jess Thurgur	1,572	40.8	
Green	Christine West	452	11.7	
Green	Andronikos Panayiotou	342	8.9	
Green	Michael Ray-Howett	306	7.9	
TUSC	Gary Harbord	129	3.3	
Turnout		3,857	39.0	
Conservative win (new seat)				
Labour win (new seat)				
Conservative win (new seat)				

=== West Drayton ===
West Drayton (3)
Party	Candidate	Votes	%	±%
Labour	Jan Sweeting	2,111	57.7	
Labour	Scott Farley	1,968	53.8	
Labour	Mohammed Islam	1,911	52.2	
Conservative	Kelly Martin	1,428	39.0	
Conservative	Sanjiv Bisnauthsing	1,312	35.9	
Conservative	Hanna Ali	1,296	35.4	
Green	Sarah West	315	8.6	
Green	Iain Bruce	272	7.4	
Green	Marcus Smith	209	5.7	
TUSC	Carlos Barros	154	4.2	
Turnout		3,659	34.1	
Labour hold				
Labour hold				
Labour hold				

=== Wood End ===
Wood End (3)
Party	Candidate	Votes	%	±%
Labour	Elizabeth Garelick	2,133	69.3	
Labour	Kamal Kaur	2,073	67.3	
Labour	Stuart Mathers	1,978	64.3	
Conservative	Nicola Brightman	969	31.5	
Conservative	Reva Gudi	886	28.8	
Conservative	David Yarrow	823	26.7	
Liberal Democrats	Chris Hooper	236	7.7	
TUSC	Jason Buck	137	4.5	
Turnout		3,078	28.2	
Labour win (new seat)				
Labour win (new seat)				
Labour win (new seat)				

=== Yeading ===
Yeading (2)
Party	Candidate	Votes	%	±%
Labour	Jas Dhot	1,553	70.5	
Labour	Rita Dhot	1,511	68.6	
Conservative	Kelly Bridges	711	32.3	
Conservative	Christopher Smallwood	633	28.7	
Turnout		2,204	28.3	
Labour hold				
Labour hold				

=== Yiewsley ===
Yiewsley (2)
Party	Candidate	Votes	%	±%
Labour	Naser Abby	1,361	59.7	
Labour	Sital Punja	1,120	49.1	
Conservative	James Cantwell	861	37.8	
Conservative	Alan Deville	842	36.9	
Green	John Bowman	205	9.0	
Green	Stephen Goss	170	7.5	
Turnout		2,279	28.3	
Labour gain from Conservative				
Labour gain from Conservative				

== By-elections ==
=== Hillingdon East ===
A by-election was held in the ward of Hillingdon East after the resignation of Conservative councillor Alan Chapman.

Hillingdon East by-election: 2 May 2024
Party	Candidate	Votes	%	±%
Conservative	Kelly Martin	2,911	58.1	−3.5
Labour	Steve Garelick	1,364	27.2	−11.2
Green	Sarah Green	363	7.2	New
Liberal Democrats	Tom Cottew	270	5.4	New
Independent	Geoff Courtenay	103	2.1	New
Turnout		5,045	46.6	
Rejected ballots		34		
Conservative hold		Swing		
