= Northwood Hills (disambiguation) =

Northwood Hills may refer to:

- Northwood Hills, Northwood, London
  - Northwood Hills tube station
  - Northwood Hills (ward)
