= 1986 Hillingdon London Borough Council election =

1986 local election in England

- 8 May 1986

The 1986 Hillingdon Council election took place on 8 May 1986 to elect members of Hillingdon London Borough Council in London, England. The whole council was up for election and the council went into no overall control.

== Election result ==
The results saw the Conservative Party lose their majority and the council went into no overall control.

1986 Hillingdon Council Election
Party	Seats	Gains	Losses	Net gain/loss	Seats %	Votes %	Votes	+/−
Labour	34							
Conservative	28							
Alliance	7							
Green	0							
Independent	0						87	
Total								

== Ward results ==
Barnhill (3)
Party	Candidate	Votes	%	±%
Labour	Richard Farrell	1,697	20	
Labour	Michael Walker	1,665	19.6	
Labour	Keith Dobson	1,656	19.5	
Conservative	Bruce Howell	824	9.7	
Conservative	Joyce Tyrrell	799	9.4	
Conservative	Cynthia Robertson	759	8.94	
Alliance	Jean Slatter	377	4.4	
Alliance	Grace Maguire	367	4.3	
Alliance	Ian Walter	343	4	

Botwell (2)
Party	Candidate	Votes	%	±%
Labour	Jonathan Davey	1,232	27.5	
Labour	Eugene Finlay	1,168	26	
Conservative	Robin Bolden	554	12.3	
Alliance	Barrie Griffiths	528	11.8	
Alliance	John Houghton	508	11.3	
Conservative	Percy King	496	11.1	

Bourne (2)
Party	Candidate	Votes	%	±%
Labour	Mark Gage	987	21.34	
Conservative	James O'Neill	985	21.3	
Labour	Alan Blundell	977	21.1	
Conservative	Albert Kanjee	820	17.8	
Alliance	Keith Baker	442	9.6	
Alliance	Clarissa Parsonage	413	9	

Cavendish (2)
Party	Candidate	Votes	%	±%
Alliance	Stephen Carey	1,384	23.8	
Alliance	Angela Wegener	1,367	23.6	
Conservative	Graham Horn	1,175	20.3	
Conservative	Bernard Smart	1,143	19.7	
Labour	Maureen Crimmins	365	6.3	
Labour	Eric Edlin	361	6.2	

Charville (3)
Party	Candidate	Votes	%	±%
Labour	Michael Craxton	1,433	14.8	
Labour	John Frost	1,390	14.3	
Labour	Christoper Malkin	1,386	14.29	
Conservative	Patrick Cooke	1292	13.3	
Conservative	Albert Tyrell	1259	13	
Conservative	Arthur Preston	1221	12.6	
Alliance	Leonard Beakhust	599	6.2	
Alliance	John Sharp	571	5.9	
Alliance	Stefan Tomorri	547	5.6	

Colham (2)
Party	Candidate	Votes	%	±%
Labour	Brian Hudson	1,071	26.2	
Labour	Philip Kordun	990	24.2	
Conservative	Ian Taylor	681	16.7	
Conservative	Philip Waine	675		
Alliance	Michael Fordham	334		
Alliance	James E.R. Mole	293		
Green	Toni C. Ward	46	1.1%	

Cowley (3)
Party	Candidate	Votes	%	±%
Labour	Peter James	1,388		
Labour	Patricia M. R. William	1,376		
Labour	Jane F. Rose-Williams	1,376		
Conservative	Richard M. Barnes	1397		
Conservative	Betty M. Buttrum	1269		
Conservative	David A. Nurse	1199		
Alliance	Alexander J.R. Green	609		
Alliance	Hilary F. Leighter	587		
Alliance	Alan T. Whitell	575		

Crane (2)
Party	Candidate	Votes	%	±%
Labour	Patrick R. Lyons	877		
Labour	Karen R. Liveny	862		
Conservative	Peter Clements	671		
Conservative	Alfred G. Langley	625		
Alliance	Marjorie E. Stephenson	392		
Alliance	Richard J. Bristow	390		

Deansfield (2)
Party	Candidate	Votes	%	±%
Alliance	Charles E. Wegener	1,205		
Conservative	Sally Fern	1,118		
Alliance	Anthony W. Worker	1097		
Conservative	Geoffrey A. Harwood-Barnes	1087		
Labour	Ronald H. Collman	823		
Labour	David J. Horne	760		

Eastcote (3)
Party	Candidate	Votes	%	±%
Conservative	Leonard J. Lally	2,390		
Conservative	Terence P. Dicks	2,378		
Conservative	Dr David W. Payne	2,341		
Alliance	Mark P. Burton	923		
Alliance	Mary G. Butcher	877		
Alliance	Ann M. Alagappa	850		
Labour	Sarah P. Johnson	487		
Labour	June Green	485		
Labour	Valerie A. Robets	476		
Green	Robert Ersanilli	130		

Harefield (2)
Party	Candidate	Votes	%	±%
Conservative	Donald H. Mitchell	1,203		
Conservative	Kenneth R. Abel	1,136		
Labour	Jennifer Fletcher	1039		
Labour	Philip S. Berry	1016		
Alliance	Elizabeth V. Jelfs	400		
Alliance	Edward J. Mace	305		
Green	Ian E. Findall	166		

Harlington (3)
Party	Candidate	Votes	%	±%
Labour	Brian T. Neighbour	1,168		
Labour	Raymond J. Travell	1,068		
Alliance	Anthony J. Little	1,006		
Labour	Prakash P.K. Auchombit	979		
Conservative	Derrick Coxhill	928		
Alliance	Michael L. Smith	911		
Conservative	Stephen E. Hayles	908		
Alliance	Richard A. Bonner	889		
Conservative	Ronald A. Lunniss	857		
Independent	Robert W. Lewis	87		

Heathrow (2)
Party	Candidate	Votes	%	±%
Labour	Hubert J. C. Key	1,240		
Labour	Jeffrey B. Gray	1,179		
Conservative	David V. L. Hopkins	1,012		
Conservative	Charles W. G. Rackstraw	910		

Hillingdon East (2)
Party	Candidate	Votes	%	±%
Labour	Arthur R. Groves	955		
Labour	Simon Gelberg	943		
Alliance	Gillian F. Rhodes	808		
Alliance	Jane M. Chandler	758		
Conservative	Hilda M. Sibley	676		
Conservative	Lynn U. Thomas	649		

Hillingdon North (2)
Party	Candidate	Votes	%	±%
Alliance	Patrick F. Filgate	1,266		
Alliance	Brian Outhwaite	1,164		
Labour	John G. Lonsdale	982		
Labour	John Bebbington	967		
Conservative	Stanley C. Montgomery	951		
Conservative	Winifred Montgomery	852		

Hillingdon West (3)
Party	Candidate	Votes	%	±%
Conservative	Andrew J. Boff	1,329		
Conservative	Elsie G. Boff	1,285		
Conservative	Ernest L. Ing	1,271		
Labour	Tony Rogers	981		
Labour	Pauline Hunter	971		
Labour	Betty A. Wake	943		
Alliance	Peter R. Craxton	592		

Ickenham (3)
Party	Candidate	Votes	%	±%
Conservative	Keith C. Briggs	2,992		
Conservative	James Rothwell	2,861		
Conservative	Mavis Knight	2,840		
Alliance	Glennis M. Bjorge	909		
Alliance	Margaret B. Locke	839		
Alliance	Sidney H. Davidson	805		
Labour	John Buckingham	737		
Labour	Peter W. Kent	675		
Labour	Peter L. N. Smith	659		
Green	Roger E. Moon	339		

Manor (2)
Party	Candidate	Votes	%	±%
Conservative	Edwin Hales	1,213		
Alliance	Derek J. P. Honeygold	1,205		
Conservative	Marcel V. Jolinon	1,184		
Alliance	Kim M. Mathen	1,065		
Labour	Laurence R. Levy	568		
Labour	John F. Moyniham	517		

Northwood (3)
Party	Candidate	Votes	%	±%
Conservative	Barry D. Kester	2,213		
Conservative	Jonathan P. S. Bianco	2,211		
Conservative	Frank W. Taylor	2,184		
Alliance	Anthony N. S. Lane	621		
Alliance	Jacob V. Matias	589		
Alliance	Andrew W. Peach	566		
Labour	Keith Goldsworthy	304		
Labour	Janette E. Michael	301		
Labour	Howard K. Preston	275		

Northwood Hills (3)
Party	Candidate	Votes	%	±%
Conservative	Derek N. List	1,609		
Conservative	Frederick E. Walsh	1,570		
Conservative	Graham E. Sewell	1,562		
Alliance	Richard K. Drew	981		
Alliance	Diane M. Holden	938		
Alliance	Susan Everett	904		
Labour	Christopher J. Johnson	618		
Labour	Stafford L. C. Cottman	611		
Labour	Michael J. S. Roberts	596		

Ruislip (2)
Party	Candidate	Votes	%	±%
Conservative	Edmund G. Booth	1,678		
Conservative	Michael Kilbey	1,607		
Alliance	David W. G. Cox	639		
Alliance	Neville G. Parsonage	622		
Labour	Clifford G. Barton	343		
Labour	Christopher J. Gadsden	318		

St Martins (2)
Party	Candidate	Votes	%	±%
Conservative	Kenneth T. Guy	1,666		
Conservative	Douglas S. Mills	1,626		
Alliance	Mary C. Hugo	625		
Alliance	Melanie M. Winterbotham	609		
Labour	Kathleen Dallas	449		
Labour	Trevor A. T. Richards	444		

Townfield (3)
Party	Candidate	Votes	%	±%
Labour	Oswald Garvin	1,924		
Labour	Graham C. Rogers	1,809		
Labour	Bernice Crow	1,772		
Conservative	Sylvia C. Hector	820		
Conservative	Margaret Brazier	818		
Conservative	Laurence F. Redding	793		
Alliance	Gary W. Carter	618		

Uxbridge North (2)
Party	Candidate	Votes	%	±%
Conservative	Evan C. Bowen	1,487		
Conservative	David W. Harnott	1,476		
Alliance	Keith Hales	465		
Alliance	Arthur R. Holden	404		
Labour	Helen A. Lee	360		
Labour	Christopher D. Lee	305		

Uxbridge South (2)
Party	Candidate	Votes	%	±%
Labour	Gordon M. Bogan	1,015		
Labour	Claran G. Beary	1,014		
Conservative	John E. P. Morgan	746		
Conservative	Richard E. B. York	727		
Alliance	Stephen Urwin	285		
Alliance	Alan H. Kurtz	280		

West Drayton (2)
Party	Candidate	Votes	%	±%
Conservative	Norman C. Hawkins	1,190		
Conservative	John E. Carsons	1,131		
Labour	Helen E. Harmsworth	1,064		
Labour	David M. E. Keys	1,019		
Alliance	Iain P. Campbell	387		
Alliance	Kevin J. Monks	295		

Wood End (2)
Party	Candidate	Votes	%	±%
Labour	Peter F. Fagan	1,290		
Labour	Graham R. Tomlin	1,059		
Conservative	Roger A. Inions	773		
Conservative	Elizabeth Bryant	722		
Alliance	James Batchelor	320		
Alliance	Joy R. Drew	275		

Yeading (3)
Party	Candidate	Votes	%	±%
Labour	Joseph Fenton	1,303		
Labour	Bernard G. Franklin	1,195		
Labour	Edward Harris	1,171		
Conservative	Mervyn T. R. Burgess	840		
Conservative	Leonard P. Rowswell	789		
Conservative	Lynne M. Avery	782		
Alliance	Ram R. Chandar	340		
Alliance	Elsie E. Broughton	230		

Yiewsley (2)
Party	Candidate	Votes	%	±%
Labour	Paul K. Harmsworth	1,155		
Labour	Michael Murray	1,039		
Conservative	Michael J. D. Bull	777		
Conservative	Anthony J. Carragher	729		
Alliance	Dennis V. Tuckwell	275		
Alliance	Abdul R. Quraishi	234		
