= Belmore (ward) =

Electoral ward in London, England

- Electoral ward for the Hillingdon London Borough Council
- Borough: Hillingdon
- County: Greater London
- Population: 17,492 (2021)
- Area: 2.398 km²

Current electoral ward
- Created: 2022
- Seats: 3

Belmore is an electoral ward in the London Borough of Hillingdon. The ward was first used in the 2022 elections and elects three councillors to Hillingdon London Borough Council. It was previously used from 1964 to 1978.

== Geography ==
The ward is named after the suburb of Belmore.

== Councillors ==
| Election | Councillors | | |
|---|---|---|---|
| 2022 | Labina Basit (Labour) | Jagjit Singh (Labour) | Narinder Garg (Labour) |

== Elections ==
=== 2022 ===
Belmore (3)
| Party | Candidate | Votes | % | ±% |
|---|---|---|---|---|
| Labour | Labina Basit | 2,421 | 70.7 | |
| Labour | Jagjit Singh | 2,421 | 70.7 | |
| Labour | Narinder Garg | 2,368 | 69.2 | |
| Conservative | Cameron Bell | 923 | 27.0 | |
| Conservative | John Morgan | 824 | 24.1 | |
| Conservative | Isobel Rodrigues | 795 | 23.2 | |
| Green | Katherine Lee | 268 | 7.8 | |
| Green | Andrew Gibbs | 252 | 7.4 | |
| Turnout | | 3,424 | 34.64 | |
| Labour win (new seat) | | | | |
| Labour win (new seat) | | | | |
| Labour win (new seat) | | | | |

== See also ==
- List of electoral wards in Greater London
