= Colham and Cowley =

Electoral ward in London, England

- Electoral ward for the Hillingdon London Borough Council
- Borough: Hillingdon
- County: Greater London
- Population: 19,136 (2021)
- Major settlements: Cowley, London
- Area: 4.534 km²

Current electoral ward
- Created: 2022
- Seats: 3

Colham and Cowley is an electoral ward in the London Borough of Hillingdon. The ward was first used in the 2022 elections and elects three councillors to Hillingdon London Borough Council.

== Geography ==
The ward is named after the suburbs of Colham and Cowley.

== Councillors ==
Election	Councillors		
2022	Shehryar Ahmad-Wallana (Conservative)	Roy Chamdal (Conservative)	Ekta Gohil (Conservative)

== Elections ==
=== 2022 ===
Colham & Cowley (3)
Party	Candidate	Votes	%	±%
Conservative	Shehyrar Ahmad-Wallana	1,851	50.2	
Conservative	Roy Chamdal	1,822	49.4	
Conservative	Ekta Gohil	1,702	46.1	
Labour	Tony Eginton	1,572	42.6	
Labour	Steve Garelick	1,455	39.5	
Labour	Karina Marqvardt Jogart	1,394	37.8	
Green	Nicole Rosemary Cathryn Crook	296	8.0	
Green	Valerie Ann McDonnell	289	7.8	
Green	Lucy Jane Edwina West	266	7.2	
NHA	Alastair James Fischer	219	5.9	
UKIP	Geoff Courtenay	199	5.4	
Turnout		3,688	36.5	
Conservative win (new seat)				
Conservative win (new seat)				
Conservative win (new seat)				

== See also ==
- List of electoral wards in Greater London
