= Hayes Town (ward) =

Electoral ward in London, England

- Electoral ward for the Hillingdon London Borough Council
- Borough: Hillingdon
- County: Greater London
- Population: 14,998 (2021)
- Major settlements: Hayes, Hillingdon
- Area: 3.783 km²

Current electoral ward
- Created: 2022
- Seats: 3

Hayes Town is an electoral ward in the London Borough of Hillingdon. The ward was first used in the 2022 elections and elects three councillors to Hillingdon London Borough Council.

== Geography ==
The ward is named after the town of Hayes.

== Councillors ==
Election	Councillors		
2022	Peter Curling (Labour) (Independent since 2025)	Janet Gardner (Labour) (Independent since 2025)	Raju Sansurpuri (Labour)

== Elections ==
=== 2022 ===
Hayes Town (3)
Party	Candidate	Votes	%	±%
Labour	Peter Allan Curling	1,906	78.5	
Labour	Janet Elizabeth Gardner	1,844	75.9	
Labour	Raju Sansurpuri	1,812	74.6	
Conservative	Lauren Davies	593	24.4	
Conservative	Taf Sowe	463	19.1	
Conservative	Tristan Clemens Johannes Pahl	454	18.7	
Let London Live	Hazel Gillender	212	8.7	
Turnout		2,428	28.3	
Labour win (new seat)				
Labour win (new seat)				
Labour win (new seat)				

== See also ==
- List of electoral wards in Greater London
