= Heathrow Villages (ward) =

Electoral ward in London, England

- Electoral ward for the Hillingdon London Borough Council
- Heathrow Villages ward boundaries since 2022
- Borough: Hillingdon
- County: Greater London
- Population: 14,041 (2021)
- Major settlements: Heathrow
- Area: 23.54 km²

Current electoral ward
- Created: 2002
- Seats: 2 (since 2022); 3 (until 2022)

Heathrow Villages is an electoral ward in the London Borough of Hillingdon. The ward was first used in the 2002 elections and elects two councillors to Hillingdon London Borough Council.

== Geography ==
The ward is named after the villages in the vicinity of Heathrow Airport.

== Councillors ==
Election	Councillors	
2022	June Nelson (Labour)	Peter Money (Labour)
2026	Narinder Garg (Labour)	Matthew Elder (Reform)

== Elections ==
=== 2026 election ===
The election took place on 7 May 2026.

2026 Hillingdon London Borough Council election: Heathrow Villages (2)
Party	Candidate	Votes	%	±%
Labour	Narinder Garg	803	25.8	
Reform	Matthew Elder	798	25.7	
Labour	Bharat Singh Thind	754	24.2	
Conservative	Darren Brian Upjohn	630	20.3	
Conservative	Sanjiv Bisnauthsing	618	19.9	
Reform	Ali Salimian	577	18.6	
Green	Christine West	534	17.2	
Independent	Mario Quadros	407	13.1	
Green	David Williams	404	13.0	
Independent	Vishal Mistry	162	5.2	
Liberal Democrats	Kim Mathulla Mathen	145	4.7	
Turnout		3110	33.87	+4.27
Labour hold				
Reform gain from Labour				

=== 2022 ===
Heathrow Villages (2)
Party	Candidate	Votes	%	±%
Labour	June Nelson	1,336	55.5	
Labour	Peter Fraz Money	1,274	53.0	
Conservative	Christine Mary Taylor	943	39.2	
Conservative	Daniel Michael Sydenham	886	36.8	
Green	Alice Joy Greenham	227	9.4	
Green	Zahid Hussain Khan	146	6.1	
Turnout		2,406	29.6	
Labour hold				
Labour hold				

== See also ==
- List of electoral wards in Greater London
