= Ickenham and South Harefield =

Electoral ward in London, England

- Electoral ward for the Hillingdon London Borough Council
- Borough: Hillingdon
- County: Greater London
- Population: 15,516 (2021)
- Major settlements: Ickenham and Harefield
- Area: 8.906 km²

Current electoral ward
- Created: 2022
- Seats: 3
- Created from: Ickenham, Harefield

Ickenham and South Harefield is an electoral ward in the London Borough of Hillingdon. The ward was first used in the 2022 elections and elects three councillors to Hillingdon London Borough Council.

== Geography ==
The ward is named after the suburbs of Ickenham and South Harefield.

== Councillors ==
| Election | Councillors | | |
|---|---|---|---|
| 2022 | Martin Goddard (Conservative) | Eddie Lavery (Conservative) | Kaushik Banerjee (Conservative) |

== Elections ==
=== 2022 ===
Ickenham & South Harefield (3)
| Party | Candidate | Votes | % | ±% |
|---|---|---|---|---|
| Conservative | Martin Alan Goddard | 2,734 | 58.1 | |
| Conservative | Eddie Lavery | 2,681 | 57.0 | |
| Conservative | Kaushik Kumar Banerjee | 2,537 | 53.9 | |
| Green | Sarah Charmian Green | 1,246 | 26.5 | |
| Labour | John Campbell | 1,111 | 23.6 | |
| Green | Rose-Marie Adams | 1,061 | 22.5 | |
| Labour | Paul William Espley | 997 | 21.2 | |
| Labour | Kevin Peter McDonald | 938 | 19.9 | |
| Green | Zena Patricia Jean Wigram | 817 | 17.4 | |
| Turnout | | 4,707 | 41.2 | |
| Conservative win (new seat) | | | | |
| Conservative win (new seat) | | | | |
| Conservative win (new seat) | | | | |

== See also ==
- List of electoral wards in Greater London
