= Pinkwell =

Electoral ward in London, England

- Electoral ward for the Hillingdon London Borough Council
- Borough: Hillingdon
- County: Greater London
- Population: 16,709 (2021)
- Area: 3.036 km²

Current electoral ward
- Created: 2002
- Seats: 3

Pinkwell is an electoral ward in the London Borough of Hillingdon. The ward was first used in the 2002 elections and elects three councillors to Hillingdon London Borough Council.

== Geography ==
The ward is named after the area of Pinkwell.

== Councillors ==
| Election | Councillors | | |
|---|---|---|---|
| 2022 | Tony Gill (Labour) | Kuldeep Lakhmana (Labour) | Gursharan Mand (Labour) |

== Elections ==
=== 2022 ===
Pinkwell (3)
| Party | Candidate | Votes | % | ±% |
|---|---|---|---|---|
| Labour | Tony Gill | 2,314 | 80.0 | |
| Labour | Kuldeep Lakhmana | 2,214 | 76.5 | |
| Labour | Gursharan Mand | 2,154 | 74.5 | |
| Conservative | Rosie Giddings | 692 | 23.9 | |
| Conservative | Darren Upjohn | 669 | 23.1 | |
| Conservative | Allan Kauffman | 635 | 21.9 | |
| Turnout | | 2,893 | 29.32 | |
| Labour hold | | | | |
| Labour hold | | | | |
| Labour hold | | | | |

== See also ==
- List of electoral wards in Greater London
