= Ruislip Manor (ward) =

Electoral ward in London, England

- Electoral ward for the Hillingdon London Borough Council
- Borough: Hillingdon
- County: Greater London
- Population: 10,980 (2021)
- Major settlements: Ruislip Manor
- Area: 1.788 km²

Current electoral ward
- Created: 2022
- Seats: 2

Ruislip Manor is an electoral ward in the London Borough of Hillingdon. The ward was first used in the 2022 elections and elects two councillors to Hillingdon London Borough Council.

== Geography ==
The ward is named after the suburb of Ruislip Manor.

== Councillors ==
Election	Councillors	
2022	Susan O'Brien (Conservative)	Douglas Mills (Conservative)

== Elections ==
=== 2022 ===
Ruislip Manor (2)
Party	Candidate	Votes	%	±%
Conservative	Susan Catherine O' Brien	1,976	62.7	
Conservative	Douglas Stuart Mills	1,951	61.9	
Labour	Norrette Pauline Moore	806	25.6	
Labour	Roshan Lal Ghei	782	24.8	
Green	Graham John Lee	291	9.2	
Liberal Democrats	Melanie Margaret Winterbotham	268	8.5	
Green	Geoffrey Wilkinson	228	7.2	
Turnout		3,151	41.6	
Conservative win (new seat)				
Conservative win (new seat)				

== See also ==
- List of electoral wards in Greater London
