= Harefield Village =

Electoral ward in London, England

- Electoral ward for the Hillingdon London Borough Council
- Harefield Village ward boundaries since 2022
- Borough: Hillingdon
- County: Greater London
- Population: 5,741 (2021) (Note: 2021 Census data reported for 2022 ward boundaries)
- Electorate: 4,093 (2022)
- Major settlements: Harefield
- Area: 7.303 square kilometres (2.820 sq mi)

Current electoral ward
- Created: 2022
- Number of members: 1
- Councillors: Tommy Balaam
- Created from: Harefield
- GSS code: E05013568

Harefield Village is an electoral ward in the London Borough of Hillingdon. The ward was first used in the 2022 elections and elects one councillor to Hillingdon London Borough Council.

== List of councillors ==
| Councillor | Took office | Left office | Party | Election |
|---|---|---|---|---|
| Jane Palmer | 2022 | 2026 | Conservative | 2022 |
| Tommy Balaam | 2026 | Incumbent | Conservative | 2026 |

== Hillingdon council elections ==
=== 2026 election ===
The election took place on 7 May 2026.

2026 Hillingdon London Borough Council election: Harefield Village
| Party | Candidate | Votes | % | ±% |
|---|---|---|---|---|
| Conservative | Tommy Balaam | 980 | 45.3 | |
| Reform | Gerard Barry | 816 | 37.8 | |
| Liberal Democrats | Jonathan Banks | 200 | 9.3 | |
| Labour | Malcolm Widgington | 165 | 7.6 | |
| Turnout | | 2,161 | 53.34 | +13.39 |
| Conservative hold | | Swing | | |

=== 2022 election ===
The election took place on 5 May 2022.

2022 Hillingdon London Borough Council election: Harefield Village
| Party | Candidate | Votes | % | ±% |
|---|---|---|---|---|
| Conservative | Jane Palmer | 929 | 56.9 | |
| Green | Niki Samuel | 524 | 32.1 | |
| Labour | Mohinder Birah | 179 | 11.0 | |
| Majority | | | | |
| Turnout | | | 39.95 | |
| Conservative win (new seat) | | | | |
