= West Drayton (ward) =

Electoral ward in London, England

- Electoral ward for the Hillingdon London Borough Council
- Borough: Hillingdon
- County: Greater London
- Population: 18,433 (2021)
- Major settlements: West Drayton
- Area: 3.492 km²

Current electoral ward
- Created: 1978
- Seats: 3 (since 2002); 2 (until 2002)

West Drayton is an electoral ward in the London Borough of Hillingdon. The ward was first used in the 1978 elections and elects three councillors to Hillingdon London Borough Council.

== Geography ==
The ward is named after the town of West Drayton.

== Councillors ==
Election	Councillors		
2022	Jan Sweeting (Labour)	Scott Farley (Labour) (Independent since 2025)	Mohammed Shofiul Islam (Labour)

== Elections ==
=== 2022 ===
West Drayton (3)
Party	Candidate	Votes	%	±%
Labour	Jan Sweeting	2,111	57.7	
Labour	Scott Myles Farley	1,968	53.8	
Labour	Mohammed Shofiul Islam	1,911	52.2	
Conservative	Kelly Martin	1,428	39.0	
Conservative	Sanjiv Bisnauthsing	1,312	35.9	
Conservative	Hanna Ahmed Ali	1,296	35.4	
Green	Sarah West	315	8.6	
Green	Iain John Bruce	272	7.4	
Green	Marcus Smith	209	5.7	
TUSC	Carlos Barros	154	4.2	
Turnout		3,659	34.1	
Labour hold				
Labour hold				
Labour hold				

== See also ==
- List of electoral wards in Greater London
