= Northwood (ward) =

Electoral ward in London, England

- Electoral ward for the Hillingdon London Borough Council
- Borough: Hillingdon
- County: Greater London
- Population: 11,310 (2021)
- Major settlements: Northwood, London
- Area: 7.410 km²

Current electoral ward
- Created: 1965
- Seats: 2 (since 2022); 3 (until 2022)

Northwood is an electoral ward in the London Borough of Hillingdon. The ward was first used in the 1964 elections and elects two councillors to Hillingdon London Borough Council.

== Geography ==
The ward is named after the town of Northwood, London.

== Councillors ==
| Election | Councillors | |
|---|---|---|
| 2022 | Henry Higgins (Conservative) | Richard Lewis (Conservative) |

== Elections ==
=== 2022 ===
Northwood (2)
| Party | Candidate | Votes | % | ±% |
|---|---|---|---|---|
| Conservative | Henry Gary Allan Higgins | 1,823 | 61.9 | |
| Conservative | Richard Anthony Lewis | 1,783 | 60.5 | |
| Labour | Jonathan Charles Hutchins | 630 | 21.4 | |
| Liberal Democrats | Jonathan Michael Banks | 557 | 18.9 | |
| Liberal Democrats | David William Miller | 455 | 15.4 | |
| Green | Fiona Claire Holding | 288 | 9.8 | |
| Labour | John Laurence Oswell | 186 | 6.3 | |
| Green | Scott Edward Miles | 170 | 5.8 | |
| Turnout | | 2,946 | 38.5 | |
| Conservative hold | | | | |
| Conservative hold | | | | |

== See also ==
- List of electoral wards in Greater London
