= Hillingdon West =

Electoral ward in London, England

- Former electoral ward for the Hillingdon London Borough Council
- Hillingdon West ward boundaries since 2022
- Borough: Hillingdon
- County: Greater London
- Population: 9,690 (2021) (Note: 2021 Census data reported for 2022 ward boundaries)
- Electorate: 6,381 (2022)
- Major settlements: Hillingdon
- Area: 2.182 square kilometres (0.842 sq mi)

Former electoral ward
- Created: 1965
- Current: 2022
- Number of members: 1965–2002: 3; 2022–present: 2
- Councillors: Adam Bennett; Reeta Chamdal
- Created from: Brunel, Uxbridge North and Uxbridge South in 2022
- GSS code: E05013572

Hillingdon West is an electoral ward in the London Borough of Hillingdon. The ward was first used in the 2022 elections and elects two councillors to Hillingdon London Borough Council. It was previously used from 1964 to 2002.

== List of councillors ==
Seat	Councillor	Took office	Left office	Party	Election
1	Adam Bennett	2022	Incumbent	Conservative	2022, 2026
2	Reeta Chamdal	2022	Incumbent	Conservative	2022, 2026

== Hillingdon council elections since 2022 ==
There was a revision of ward boundaries in Hillingdon in 2022 and the ward was recreated, with substantially different boundaries. The ward is made up of territory that had been part of Brunel, Uxbridge North and Uxbridge South.

=== 2026 election ===
The general election of councillors took place on 7 May 2026. The vote for Hillingdon West was postponed until 18 June 2026, following the death of Shaun Cooling, one of the Reform candidates.

2026 Hillingdon London Borough Council election: Hillingdon West (2)
Party	Candidate	Votes	%	±%
Conservative	Adam Bennett	1,084		
Conservative	Reeta Chamdal	949		
Labour	Tiff Beales	470		
Reform	Margaret Forrest	433		
Labour	Imran Razak	362		
Reform	Justin Anderson	347		
Green	Ruhi Patel	353		
Green	Alicia Windsor	341		
Liberal Democrats	Muhammad Iqbal	63		
Liberal Democrats	Gautam Sabarwal	49		
Turnout				
Conservative hold		Swing		
Conservative hold		Swing		

=== 2022 election ===
The election took place on 5 May 2022.

2022 Hillingdon London Borough Council election: Hillingdon West (2)
Party	Candidate	Votes	%	±%
Conservative	Adam Bennett	1,124	57.3	
Conservative	Reeta Chamdal	1,014	51.7	
Labour	Margaret McDonald	704	35.9	
Labour	Ray Meen	688	35.0	
Green	Christine Pratt	213	10.9	
Green	David Allam	184	9.4	
Turnout		1,963	31.6	
Conservative win (new seat)				
Conservative win (new seat)				

== 1978–2002 Hillingdon council elections ==
Hillingdon West ward boundaries between 1978 and 2002

There was a revision of ward boundaries in Hillingdon in 1978.

=== 1998 election ===
The election on 7 May 1998 took place on the same day as the 1998 Greater London Authority referendum.

=== 1994 election ===
The election took place on 5 May 1994.

=== 1990 election ===
The election took place on 3 May 1990.

=== 1986 election ===
The election took place on 8 May 1986.

=== 1982 election ===
The election took place on 6 May 1982.

=== 1978 election ===
The election took place on 4 May 1978.

== 1964–1978 Hillingdon council elections ==
=== 1974 election ===
The election took place on 2 May 1974.

=== 1971 election ===
The election took place on 13 May 1971.

=== 1968 election ===
The election took place on 9 May 1968.

=== 1964 election ===
The election took place on 7 May 1964.
