= Yeading (ward) =

Electoral ward in London, England

- Electoral ward for the Hillingdon London Borough Council
- Borough: Hillingdon
- County: Greater London
- Population: 13,416 (2021)
- Major settlements: Yeading
- Area: 2.311 km²

Current electoral ward
- Created: 1965
- Seats: 2 (since 2022); 3 (1978-2022); 4 (1965-1978)

Yeading is an electoral ward in the London Borough of Hillingdon. The ward was first used in the 1964 elections and elects two councillors to Hillingdon London Borough Council.

== Geography ==
The ward is named after the suburb of Yeading.

== Councillors ==
Election	Councillors	
2022	Jas Dhot (Labour)	Rita Dhot (Labour)

== Elections ==
=== 2022 ===
Yeading (2)
Party	Candidate	Votes	%	±%
Labour	Jas Dhot	1,553	70.5	
Labour	Rita Dhot	1,511	68.6	
Conservative	Kelly Marie Bridges	711	32.3	
Conservative	Christopher Smallwood	633	28.7	
Turnout		2,204	28.3	
Labour hold				
Labour hold				

== See also ==
- List of electoral wards in Greater London
