= Wood End (ward) =

Electoral ward in London, England

- Electoral ward for the Hillingdon London Borough Council
- Borough: Hillingdon
- County: Greater London
- Population: 19,802 (2021)
- Area: 3.801 km²

Current electoral ward
- Created: 2022
- Seats: 3

Wood End is an electoral ward in the London Borough of Hillingdon. The ward was first used in the 2022 elections and elects three councillors to Hillingdon London Borough Council.

== Geography ==
The ward is named after the suburb of Wood End.

== Councillors ==
Election	Councillors		
2022	Elizabeth Garelick (Labour)	Kamal Preet Kaur (Labour)	Stuart Mathers (Labour)

== Elections ==
=== 2022 ===
Wood End (3)
Party	Candidate	Votes	%	±%
Labour	Elizabeth Garelick	2,133	69.3	
Labour	Kamal Preet Kaur	2,073	67.3	
Labour	Stuart Paul Mathers	1,978	64.3	
Conservative	Nicola Brightman	969	31.5	
Conservative	Reva Anil Gudi	886	28.8	
Conservative	David Anthony Yarrow	823	26.7	
Liberal Democrats	Chris Hooper	236	7.7	
TUSC	Jason Zaidi Buck	137	4.5	
Turnout		3,078	28.2	
Labour win (new seat)				
Labour win (new seat)				
Labour win (new seat)				

== See also ==
- List of electoral wards in Greater London
