= Yiewsley (ward) =

Electoral ward in London, England

- Electoral ward for the Hillingdon London Borough Council
- Yiewsley ward boundaries since 2022
- Borough: Hillingdon
- County: Greater London
- Population: 12,406 (2021)
- Major settlements: Yiewsley
- Area: 3.238 km²

Current electoral ward
- Created: 1965
- Number of members: 2 (since 2022); 3 (2002-2022); 2 (1978-2002); 4 (1964-1978)
- Councillors: Sophie Dror; Stacey Lucas
- GSS code: E05013584 (since 2022)

Yiewsley is an electoral ward in the London Borough of Hillingdon. The ward was first used in the 1964 elections and elects two councillors to Hillingdon London Borough Council.

== Geography ==
The ward is named after the village of Yiewsley.

== Councillors ==
Election	Councillors	
2022	Naser Abby (Labour)	Sital Punja (Labour)

== Hillingdon council elections ==
=== 2026 election ===
2026 Hillingdon London Borough Council election: Yiewsley (2)
Party	Candidate	Votes	%	±%
Reform	Sophie Dror	726	27.5	
Reform	Stacey Lucas	721	27.3	
Labour	David Balghan	714	27.0	
Labour	Sagal Ismail Saed	615	23.3	
Green	Sonia Caetano	571	21.6	
Conservative	Elizabeth Moses	501	19.0	
Conservative	Sriram Tanjore	488	18.5	
Green	Damian Laprus	476	18.0	
Liberal Democrats	Robert Danavell	119	4.5	
Liberal Democrats	Mahtab Ahammad	110	4.2	
TUSC	Derek Marsdon	34	1.3	
Turnout		2640	33.14	+4.84
Reform gain from Green				
Reform gain from Labour				

=== 2022 election ===
2022 Hillingdon London Borough Council election: Yiewsley (2)
Party	Candidate	Votes	%	±%
Labour	Naser Abby	1,361	59.7	
Labour	Sital Punja	1,120	49.1	
Conservative	James Cantwell	861	37.8	
Conservative	Alan Deville	842	36.9	
Green	John Bowman	205	9.0	
Green	Stephen Goss	170	7.5	
Turnout		2,279	28.3	
Labour gain from Conservative				
Labour gain from Conservative				

== See also ==
- List of electoral wards in Greater London
