= Charville =

Electoral ward in London, England

- Electoral ward for the Hillingdon London Borough Council
- Borough: Hillingdon
- County: Greater London
- Population: 11,511 (2021)
- Major settlements: Charville Lane Estate
- Area: 2.719 km²

Current electoral ward
- Created: 1978
- Seats: 2 (since 2022); 3 (until 2022)

Charville is an electoral ward in the London Borough of Hillingdon. The ward was first used in the 1978 elections and elects two councillors to Hillingdon London Borough Council.

== Geography ==
The ward is named after the Charville Lane Estate.

== Councillors ==
Election	Councillors	
2022	Barry Nelson-West (Labour)	Darran Davies (Conservative)
2026	Archan Raval (Conservative)	Darran Davies (Conservative)

== Elections ==
=== 2026 ===
Charville (2)
Party	Candidate	Votes	%	±%
Conservative	Darran Davies	1,537	45.6	−5.0
Conservative	Archan Raval	1,197	35.5	
Labour	Eliza Castell	912	27.1	
Labour	Barry Nelson-West	812	24.1	−27.7
Reform	Roshan Bangay	600	17.8	
Reform	Gurjit Singh	531	15.8	
Green	Richard Pye	498	14.8	
Liberal Democrats	Graydon Rodwell	133	3.9	
Hayes Ind.	Chris Hills	87	2.6	
Hayes Ind.	Mike Usher	63	1.9	
UKIP	Shahana Khursheed	48	1.4	
Turnout		3,371	43.51	+4.80
Conservative gain from Labour				
Conservative hold				

=== 2022 ===
Charville (2)
Party	Candidate	Votes	%	±%
Labour	Barry Nelson-West	1,481	51.8	
Conservative	Darran Davies	1,447	50.6	
Labour	Sumen Starr	1,398	48.9	
Conservative	Teji Barnes	1,396	48.8	
Turnout		2,861	38.71	
Labour gain from Conservative				
Conservative hold				

== See also ==
- List of electoral wards in Greater London
