= Hillingdon East (ward) =

- Electoral ward for the Hillingdon London Borough Council
- Hillingdon East ward boundaries since 2022
- Borough: Hillingdon
- County: Greater London
- Population: 15,804 (2021) (Note: 2021 Census data reported for 2022 ward boundaries)
- Electorate: 10,499 (2022)
- Area: 4.505 square kilometres (1.739 sq mi)

Current electoral ward
- Created: 1965
- GSS code: E05000332 (2002–2022); E05013571 (2022–present)

Hillingdon East is an electoral ward in the London Borough of Hillingdon. The ward has existed since the creation of the borough on 1 April 1965 and first used in the 1964 elections. It returns councillors to Hillingdon London Borough Council.

== Hillingdon council elections since 2022 ==
There was a revision of ward boundaries in Hillingdon in 2022.

=== 2024 by-election ===
The by-election was held on 2 May 2024, following the resignation of Alan Chapman. It took place on the same day as the 2024 London mayoral election, the 2024 London Assembly election and 14 other borough council by-elections across London.

2024 Hillingdon East by-election
Party	Candidate	Votes	%	±%
Conservative	Kelly Martin	2,911		
Labour	Steve Garelick	1,364		
Green	Sarah Green	363		
Liberal Democrats	Tom Cottew	270		
Independent	Geoff Courtenay	103		
Turnout				
Conservative hold		Swing		

=== 2022 election ===
The election took place on 5 May 2022.

2022 Hillingdon London Borough Council election: Hillingdon East
Party	Candidate	Votes	%	±%
Conservative	Colleen Sullivan	2,104	61.6	
Conservative	Wayne Bridges	2,097	61.4	
Conservative	Alan Chapman	2,066	60.5	
Labour	Jagdeep Brar	1,311	38.4	
Labour	Gregory Goonesekera	1,231	36.1	
Labour	Gurmeet Virk	1,194	35.0	
SDP	Stephen Gardner	239	7.0	
Turnout		3,414	31.8	
Conservative win (new boundaries)				
Conservative win (new boundaries)				
Conservative win (new boundaries)				

== 2002–2022 Hillingdon council elections ==
Hillingdon East ward boundaries from 2002 to 2022

There was a revision of ward boundaries in Hillingdon in 2002.

=== 2020 by-election ===
The by-election was held on 27 February 2020, following the resignation of Pat Jackson.

2020 Hillingdon East by-election
Party	Candidate	Votes	%	±%
Conservative	Colleen Sullivan	1,430	68.8	+9.1
Labour	Annelise Roberts	488	23.5	−12.7
Liberal Democrats	Chris Hooper	86	4.1	+4.1
Green	Mark Keir	59	2.8	+2.8
UKIP	Geoff Courtenay	16	0.8	+0.8
Majority		942	45.3	
Turnout		2,079		
Conservative hold		Swing		
