= Ruislip (ward) =

Electoral ward in London, England

- Electoral ward for the Hillingdon London Borough Council
- Borough: Hillingdon
- County: Greater London
- Population: 15,441 (2021)
- Major settlements: Ruislip
- Area: 12.04 km²

Current electoral ward
- Created: 2022
- Seats: 3

Ruislip is an electoral ward in the London Borough of Hillingdon. The ward was first used in the 2022 elections and elects three councillors to Hillingdon London Borough Council.

== Geography ==
The ward is named after the suburb of Ruislip.

== Councillors ==
Election	Councillors		
2022	Philip Corthorne (Conservative)	John Riley (Conservative)	Peter Smallwood (Conservative)

== Elections ==
=== 2022 ===
Ruislip (3)
Party	Candidate	Votes	%	±%
Conservative	Philip Nigel Corthorne	3,242	69.0	
Conservative	John Riley	3,115	66.3	
Conservative	Peter William Smallwood	3,103	66.0	
Labour	John Victor Morse	986	21.0	
Labour	Jane Margaret Smith	892	19.0	
Labour	Andrew Robert Smith	808	17.2	
Green	Andrew John Blakie	625	13.3	
Liberal Democrats	Alexander Martin Cunliffe	546	11.6	
Green	Shivalee Alpeshbhai Patel	411	8.7	
Green	Jaishiva Virdee	374	8.0	
Turnout		4,701	41.8	
Conservative win (new seat)				
Conservative win (new seat)				
Conservative win (new seat)				

== See also ==
- List of electoral wards in Greater London
