= Eastcote (ward) =

Electoral ward in London, England

- Electoral ward for the Hillingdon London Borough Council
- Borough: Hillingdon
- County: Greater London
- Population: 16,912 (2021)
- Major settlements: Eastcote
- Area: 3.478 km²

Current electoral ward
- Created: 2022
- Seats: 3
- Created from: Eastcote and East Ruislip

Eastcote is an electoral ward in the London Borough of Hillingdon. The ward was first used in the 2022 elections and elects three councillors to Hillingdon London Borough Council.

== Geography ==
The ward is named after the suburb of Eastcote.

== Councillors ==
Election	Councillors		
2022	Nick Denys (Conservative)	Ian Edwards (Conservative)	Becky Haggar (Conservative)

== Elections ==
=== 2022 ===
Eastcote (3)
Party	Candidate	Votes	%	±%
Conservative	Nick Denys	3,396	65.4	
Conservative	Becky Haggar	3,272	63.1	
Conservative	Ian Kevin Edwards	3,227	62.2	
Labour	David Michael Ernest Keys	1,256	24.2	
Labour	Robert Mark Cowlin	1,201	23.1	
Labour	Joanne Charlotte Tapper	1,190	22.9	
Green	Rachel Elizabeth Ross	611	11.8	
Liberal Democrats	Tom Cottew	542	10.4	
Green	Andrew George Kennedy	495	9.5	
Green	David William Stephens	304	5.9	
TUSC	Tim Henry	72	1.4	
Turnout		5,189	42.1	
Conservative win (new seat)				
Conservative win (new seat)				
Conservative win (new seat)				

== See also ==
- List of electoral wards in Greater London
