= Northwood Hills (ward) =

Electoral ward in London, England

- Electoral ward for the Hillingdon London Borough Council
- Borough: Hillingdon
- County: Greater London
- Population: 11,771 (2021)
- Major settlements: Northwood Hills
- Area: 3.216 km²

Current electoral ward
- Created: 1978
- Seats: 2 (since 2022); 3 (until 2022)

Northwood Hills is an electoral ward in the London Borough of Hillingdon. The ward was first used in the 1978 elections and elects two councillors to Hillingdon London Borough Council.

== Geography ==
The ward is named after the suburb of Northwood Hills.

== Councillors ==
Election	Councillors	
2022	Jonathan Bianco (Conservative)	Kishan Bhatt (Conservative)

== Elections ==
=== 2022 ===
Northwood Hills (2)
Party	Candidate	Votes	%	±%
Conservative	Jonathan Philip Simon Bianco	1,686	59.2	
Conservative	Kishan Hitesh Bhatt	1,627	57.1	
Labour	Kerri Prince	754	26.5	
Labour	Shabbar Akberay Sachedina	640	22.5	
Liberal Democrats	Peter John Dollimore	359	12.6	
Green	Stephen Philip Edmeads	319	11.2	
Green	Andrew James Ross	310	10.9	
Turnout		2,847	35.4	
Conservative hold				
Conservative hold				

== See also ==
- List of electoral wards in Greater London
