= Hillingdon London Borough Council =

Local authority in London

Hillingdon Council

Type
- Type: London borough council of the London Borough of Hillingdon
- Houses: Unicameral

History
- Founded: 1 April 1965

Leadership
- Mayor: Reeta Chamdal, Conservative since 14 May 2026
- Leader: Steve Tuckwell, Conservative since 14 May 2026
- Chief Executive: Tony Zaman since 1 January 2022

Structure
- Seats: 53 councillors
- Political groups: Administration (31) Conservative (31) Other parties (22) Labour (16) Reform (3) Green (1) Independent (2)
- Length of term: Whole council elected every four years

Elections
- Voting system: Plurality at-large (FPTP)
- Last election: 7 May 2026
- Next election: 2 May 2030

Meeting place
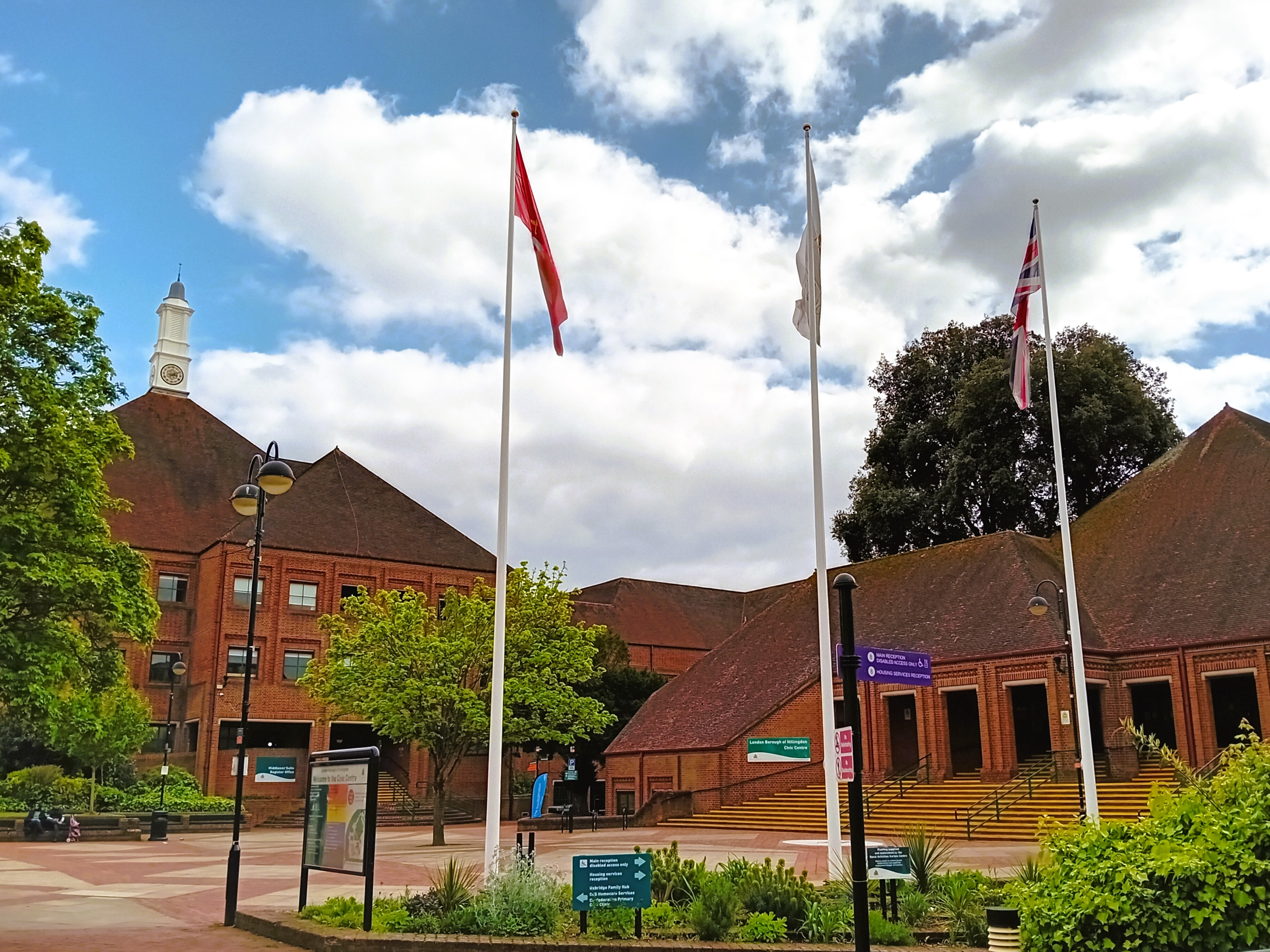
- Civic Centre, High Street, Uxbridge, UB8 1UW

Website
- www.hillingdon.gov.uk

Hillingdon London Borough Council, commonly referred to as Hillingdon Council, is the local authority for the London Borough of Hillingdon in Greater London, England. The council is responsible for the provision of a range of public services within the borough of Hillingdon. The council has been under Conservative majority control since 2006. The council is based at Hillingdon Civic Centre in Uxbridge.

== History ==
The London Borough of Hillingdon and its council were created under the London Government Act 1963, with the first election held in 1964. For its first year the council acted as a shadow authority alongside the area's four outgoing authorities, being the borough council of Uxbridge and the urban district councils of Hayes and Harlington, Ruislip-Northwood and Yiewsley and West Drayton. The new council formally came into its powers on 1 April 1965, at which point the old districts and their councils were abolished. The council's full legal name is the "Mayor and Burgesses of the London Borough of Hillingdon", although it styles itself Hillingdon Council.

From 1965 until 1986 the council was a lower-tier authority, with upper-tier functions provided by the Greater London Council. The split of powers and functions meant that the Greater London Council was responsible for "wide area" services such as fire, ambulance, flood prevention, and refuse disposal; with the boroughs (including Hillingdon) responsible for "personal" services such as social care, libraries, cemeteries and refuse collection. As an outer London borough council Hillingdon has been a local education authority since 1965. The Greater London Council was abolished in 1986 and its functions passed to the London Boroughs, with some services provided through joint committees.

Since 2000 the Greater London Authority has taken some responsibility for highways and planning control from the council, but within the English local government system the council remains a "most purpose" authority in terms of the available range of powers and functions.

== Powers and functions ==
The local authority derives its powers and functions from the London Government Act 1963 and subsequent legislation, and has the powers and functions of a London borough council. It sets council tax and as a billing authority it also collects precepts for Greater London Authority functions and business rates. It is also the local education authority.

== Political control ==
The council has been under Conservative majority control since 2006.

The first election was held in 1964, initially operating as a shadow authority alongside the outgoing authorities until it came into its powers on 1 April 1965. Political control of the council since 1965 has been as follows:

Party in control	Years
Labour	1964–1968
Conservative	1968–1971
Labour	1971–1978
Conservative	1978–1986
No overall control	1986–1990
Conservative	1990–1993
Labour	1993–1998
No overall control	1998–2006
Conservative	2006–present

=== Leadership ===
The role of mayor is largely ceremonial in Hillingdon. Political leadership is instead provided by the leader of the council. The leaders since 1965 have been:

Councillor	Party	From	To
Alfred Beck	Labour	1965	1968
Darrell Charles	Conservative	1968	1971
Alfred Beck	Labour	1971	1973
John Bartlett	Labour	1973	1978
John Watts	Conservative	1978	1984
Norman Hawkins	Conservative	1984	1986
No leader		1986	1990
Andrew Boff	Conservative	1990	1992
Richard Barnes	Conservative	1992	Aug 1993
Steve Panayi	Labour	Aug 1993	May 1994
Chris Rogers	Labour	8 May 1994	15 May 1997
Paul Harmsworth	Labour	15 May 1997	1998
Richard Barnes	Conservative	1998	2000
Ray Puddifoot	Conservative	2000	14 Jan 2021
Ian Edwards	Conservative	14 Jan 2021	May 2026
Steve Tuckwell	Conservative	14 May 2026	

=== Composition ===
Following the 2026 election, and subequent changes the composition of the council is as follows:

Party	Councillors
Conservative	31
Labour	16
Reform	3
Green	1
Independent	2
Total	53

The next election is due in May 2030.

== Wards ==
The wards of Hillingdon and the number of seats:

1. Belmore (3)
2. Charville (2)
3. Colham & Cowley (3)
4. Eastcote (3)
5. Harefield Village (1)
6. Hayes Town (3)
7. Heathrow Villages (2)
8. Hillingdon East (3)
9. Hillingdon West (2)
10. Ickenham & South Harefield (3)
11. Northwood (2)
12. Northwood Hills (2)
13. Pinkwell (3)
14. Ruislip (3)
15. Ruislip Manor (2)
16. South Ruislip (3)
17. Uxbridge (3)
18. West Drayton (3)
19. Wood End (3)
20. Yeading (2)
21. Yiewsley (2)

== Elections ==
Since the last boundary changes in 2022 the council has comprised 53 councillors representing 21 wards, with each ward electing two or three councillors. Elections are held every four years.

== Premises ==
The council is based at Hillingdon Civic Centre on the High Street in Uxbridge. The building was purpose-built for the council in phases between 1973 and 1978, and also incorporates an earlier building of 1939 which had been shared by Middlesex County Council and Uxbridge Urban District Council.
