= The World Transformed =

UK left-wing political festival

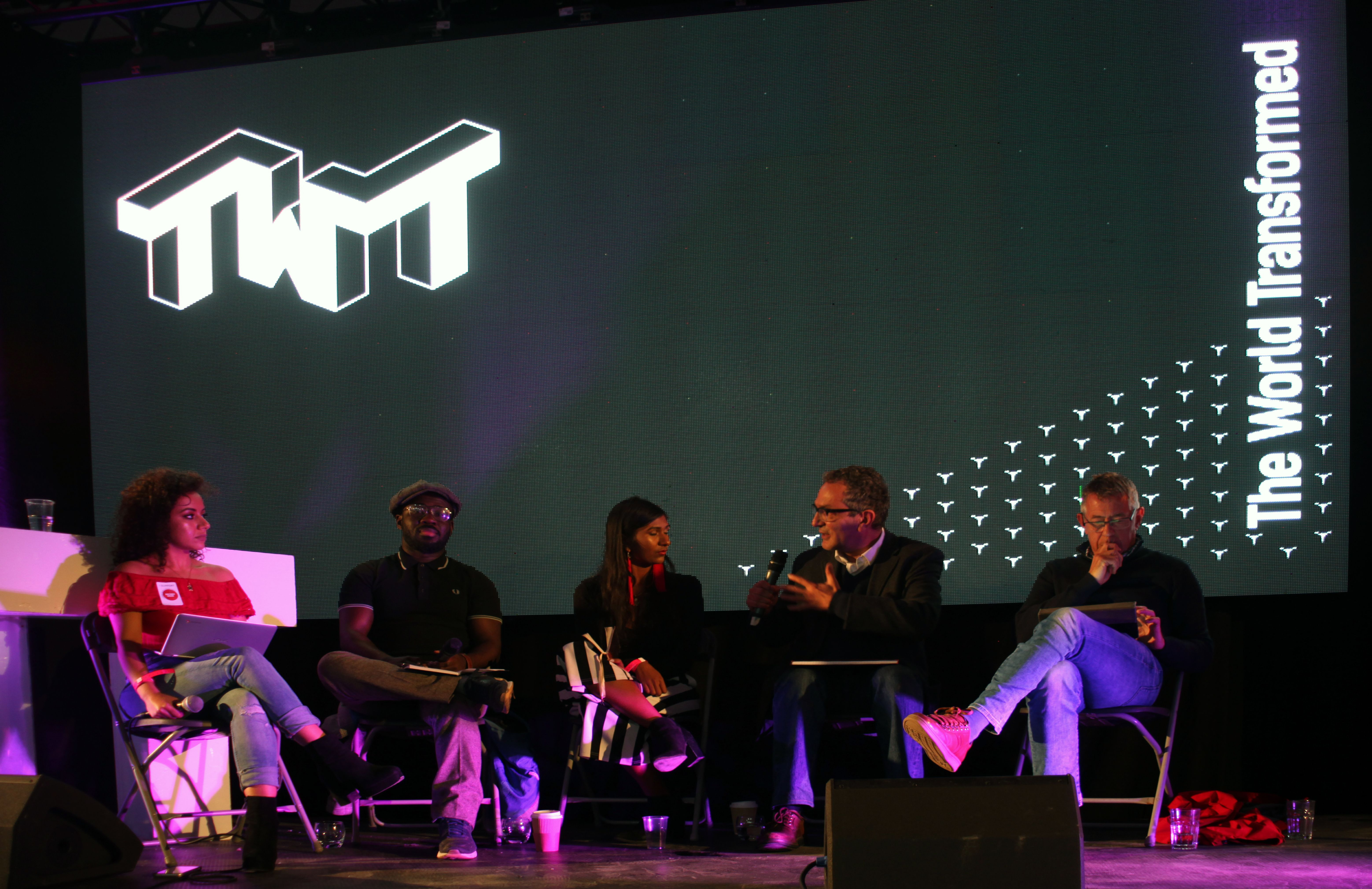
The World Transformed festival in 2018

The World Transformed (or TWT) is a political festival, which until 2023 was held as an unaffiliated fringe event running at the same time as Labour Party Conference. Beginning in 2016, organisers describe its purpose as "to create a space in which ideas can be freely exchanged and collectively developed".

== Background ==
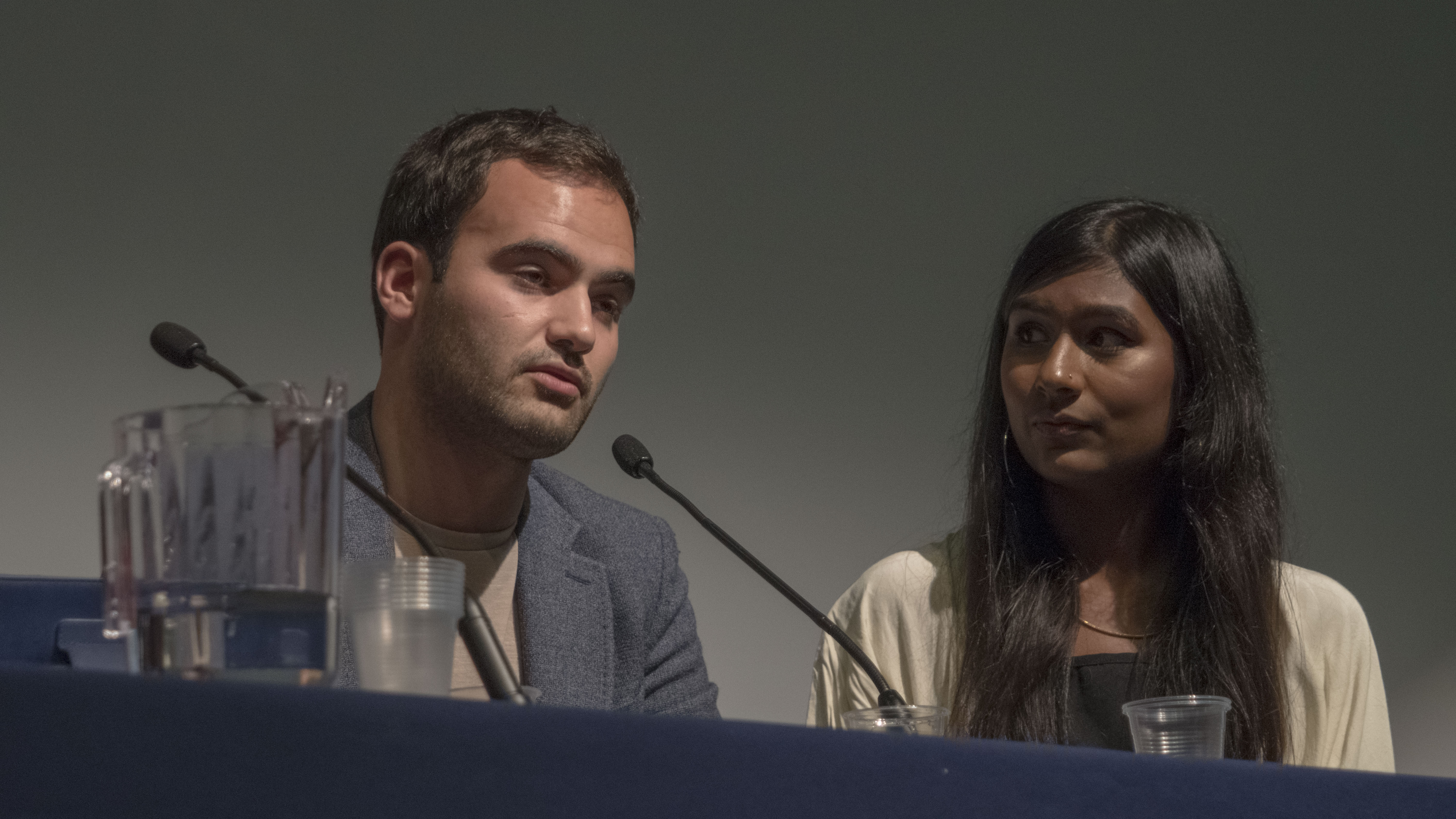
Matt Zarb-Cousin and journalist Ash Sarkar at The World Transformed 2017

The festival was created with an aim of bringing together the activist and intellectual parts of the left together, and was inspired by the Dialectics of Liberation Congress held in 1967 which took place at the Roundhouse in London. It was originally organised by the left-wing campaigning organisation Momentum, though is independent and still receives support. Some of the festival's original organisers were Andrew Dolan, Joseph Todd and Sasha Josette. With the first festival in 2016, Todd said he wanted the presence of the festival to take over the city it was happening in, much like the Edinburgh Fringe Festival. Voices in the media, such as Guardian columnist Zoe Williams, had echoed its similarity to the Edinburgh fringe festival and labelled it "a festival of ideas". Through this festival, discussions around political education and municipal socialism – considered by the New Statesman's George Eaton to have been previously dormant – were said to be revitalised.

The second festival in 2017 based in Brighton was successful, incorporating 9 different venues and had between 5,000 and 8,000 attendees. The organisers considered incorporating the Brighton Dome into the festival. In 2017 Labour leader Jeremy Corbyn endorsed the festival, describing it as "a powerful new space on the Labour Party conference fringe for people to debate policies, exchange ideas, and expand our political horizon with arts, music and culture." The attendees were largely young people who had previously taken little interest in party politics before the election of Corbyn as Labour leader in 2015 and were coming together to discuss how to build on Labour's advances in the 2017 general election. Its development has led to delegates from left-wing organisations and parties from across Europe and the USA.

Following the 2018 World Transformed event, many local events not directly organised by Momentum or TWT began to emerge. The events have been seen to foster political education, active participation, skills training, critical thinking and intellectual curiosity. Whilst some are one-day events, others such as the events in Bristol and Birmingham are multi-day festivals.

The 2020 festival took place online as a pay what you want festival due to the COVID-19 pandemic and the lockdown that ensued. It spread over the entire month of September rather than over four days. In 2021, the festival returned as a physical festival in Brighton with additional online access and – while using local venues and community centres – used its first purpose-built festival space, which was built in Old Steine Gardens park.

The 2022 and 2023 festivals took place in Liverpool.

The World Transformed did not hold a 2024 festival alongside the Labour Party Conference. The festival held its first independent iteration in October 2025, taking place in Hulme, Manchester.

== List of events ==
Date	Location	Guest speakers	Music performers	Details
September 2016	Liverpool	–	–	The first festival was hosted at the Black-E arts and community centre. Conversations at the first TWT led to a series of "Take Back Control" events being organised for 2017. Jackie Walker, Momentum's then vice-chair, caused controversy as she suggested Holocaust Memorial Day only commemorates the Jewish victims. She was suspended from Momentum and the Labour Party.
September 2017	Brighton	Jeremy Corbyn (as key-note speaker); Attila the Stockbroker, poet; John McDonnell, Shadow Chancellor; David Harvey, Marxist political economist and geography professor; Naomi Klein, author, social activist, and filmmaker; Ken Loach, director; Paul Mason, journalist and activist; George Monbiot, Climate activist and journalist	Anthony Anaxagorou; Boudicca; Horse Meat Disco; The Native (Jordan Stephens from Rizzle Kicks); Shay D; The Soweto Kinch Trio; Rum Committee	The festival hosted over 5,000 attendees with events in 9 different venues. The venues include Synergy Centre, Komedia and Fabrica. There was a stand-up comedy performance from Ava Vidal and an art display from Kennard Phillips. In October 2017, Labour MP Clive Lewis was criticised for language used at a fringe event of the conference in which he told the actor Sam Swann to "Get on your knees, bitch!". Swann later described the incident as "jovial".
September 2018	Liverpool	Jean-Luc Mélenchon (as key-note speaker); Jeremy Corbyn; Paul Darke, disability activist; Katja Kipping, leader of Die Linke; Chantal Mouffe, political theorist; Ralf Stegner, Social Democratic Party of Germany leader of the opposition in the Schleswig-Holstein region.; Zitto Kabwe, leader of Alliance for Change and Transparency; Ash Sarkar, journalist and editor of Novara Media; Faiza Shaheen, Labour Party prospective candidate for Chingford & Woodford Green and economist; Bonnie Castillo, executive director of National Nurses United	–	The venue chosen had a capacity for 10,000 attendees. Momentum had banned journalists from The Sun newspaper from having access to the festival due to its reporting of – and subsequent lack of apology for – the 1989 Hillsborough Disaster. One of the events hosted by TWT was a "Radical Bus Tour with Dan Carden". Carden, the MP for Liverpool Walton, gave a bus tour covering the key locations of protest, struggle and social progress in Liverpool.
September 2019	Brighton	Adriana Alvarez, prominent activist in the Fight for $15 movement; Diane Abbott; Omar Barghouti, co-founder of the BDS movement (via video link); Jeremy Corbyn; James Butler, co-founder of Novara Media; Ken Loach, director; Maya Goodfellow, writer and academic; Ash Sarkar, editor and co-founder of Novara Media; Hilary Wainwright, editor of Red Pepper	–	Over 5,000 people attended the festival which used 10 different venues, including setting up a hub in the Old Steine Gardens. Several Labour MPs hosted sessions as part of the "Radical Variety Show": such as Ed Miliband as a gameshow host, John McDonnell spinning a wheel of public ownership and Diane Abbott acting as an agony aunt. The festival trialled its own "policy labs" during the festival, leading to the organisation compiling these ideals and publishing a "Manifesto for the Movement".
September 2020	Online	Diane Abbott, Labour MP and member of the Socialist Campaign Group (SCG); John McDonnell, Labour MP and member of the SCG; Ilhan Omar, US Democrat Congresswomen and member of the Congressional Progressive Caucus; Ash Sarkar, editor at Novara Media; Rashida Tlaib, US Democrat Congresswomen, member of the Progressive Caucus and Democratic Socialists of America; Dave Ward, general secretary of the Communication Workers Union; Rafeef Ziadah, poet and human rights activist	–	Owing to the lockdown, the festival was completely online and took place over a month, during which dozens of events took place. A revitalised Left Book Club provided a reading group guide during the festival. Transatlantic strategy for the left was a big topic of conversation, with one segment including a conversation between Ash Sarkar, Diane Abbott and Ilhan Omar. There was also sessions that covered issues such as Black Lives Matter to rights of tenants in the private rented sector.
September 2021	Brighton	Shami Chakrabarti, Labour politician and human rights activist; Mark Drakeford, First Minister of Wales; Jo Grady, general secretary of the University and College Union; Owen Hatherley, author; Larissa Kennedy, President of the National Union of Students (NUS); Bernie Sanders, US Senator for Vermont and two time candidate for the Democratic Party's presidential nomination; Ash Sarkar, editor at Novara Media; Dave Ward, general secretary of the Communications Workers' Union	–	Festival organisers stated that over 2,000 people attended the festival and thousands more watched the talks online live. With the change in Labour party leadership and its political shift, it was noted by various writers the difference of atmosphere between The World Transformed and Labour Party Conference. The party conference was described by some as fractious and tense; whilst TWT was seen as vibrant and good humoured. Various Labour MPs on the party's left and in the Socialist Campaign Group (SCG) caucus – such as Jeremy Corbyn, John McDonnell, Clive Lewis, Zarah Sultana, Nadia Whittome and Beth Winter – took part in different panels such as the Green New Deal discussion. Sultana hosted a pub quiz during the festival. An incident occurred when Corbyn was speaking on a climate change panel and his brother Piers Corbyn, a well known climate change sceptic and COVID-19 vaccine conspiracy theorist, interrupted the panel alongside another anti-vaxx activist to spread conspiracy theories about vaccines and climate change, to which they were dealt with by the panel.
October 2025	Manchester	Jeremy Corbyn; Zarah Sultana, independent (formerly Labour) MP and co-founder of Your Party; Zack Polanski, leader of the Green Party of England and Wales; Peter Mertens, Belgian MP and former president of the Workers' Party of Belgium.; Leanne Mohamad, British Palestinian activist and parliamentary candidate for Ilford North in 2024; Emma Runswick, co-chair of the British Medical Association; Janis Ehling, general secretary of Die Linke; Nathalie Oziol, French La France Insourmise MP; Ash Sarkar, editor at Novara Media; James Meadway, British Economist and Green Party Councillor.	Dele Sosimi Afrobeat Orchestra; The Workers' Music Association (WMA) performing the music of Alan Bush, Benn Lunn, and Jimena Maldonado; Siapiau, Gary Washington, and Bint Mbareh; Ancient Hostility, Jennifer Reid, Lucy & Hazel, Chermansog, and Brown Wimpenny	Hosted 10–12 October in the neighbourhood of Hulme. This was the first iteration of the festival not to take place as a fringe of the Labour Party Conference.

== List of locally organised World Transformed events ==
- Birmingham (Started in 2019)
- Bristol (Started in 2019)
- Cardiff (Started in 2022)
- Derby (Started in 2018)
- Nottingham
- Oxford (Started in 2019)
- Southampton (Started in 2019)
- Wandsworth (Started in 2019)
- Cornwall (Started in 2022)
