= Tom Boardman =

Tom Boardman may refer to:

- Tom Boardman (racing driver) (born 1983), British racing driver
- Tom Boardman, Baron Boardman (1919–2003), English Conservative politician and businessman
