= Hayes and Harlington (constituency) =

Parliamentary constituency in the United Kingdom, 1950 onwards

Coordinates: 51.493°N 0.435°W

- Borough constituency for the House of Commons
- Interactive map of boundaries from 2024
- Location within Greater London
- County: Greater London
- Electorate: 72,897 (March 2020)
- Major settlements: Harlington, Hayes, West Drayton, Yeading, Yiewsley

Current constituency
- Created: 1950
- Member of Parliament: John McDonnell (Labour)
- Seats: One
- Created from: Southall

Hayes and Harlington is a constituency (Note: A borough constituency (for the purposes of election expenses and type of returning officer)) (Note: As with all constituencies, the constituency elects one Member of Parliament (MP) by the first past the post system of election at least every five years.) in the west of London represented in the House of Commons of the UK Parliament since 1997 by John McDonnell of the Labour Party, who also served as the Shadow Chancellor of the Exchequer from 2015 to 2020.

The seat, created in 1950, is 1 of 49 won (held or gained) by a Labour candidate in 2017 from a total of 73 covering London. In the period 1983–1997 the seat was Conservative-represented. From 1981 until 1983 the seat was represented, by defection, by a member of the Social Democratic Party (SDP) which later merged into the Liberal Democrats. From 1950 until 1983, the seat was won by Labour candidates.

Its London Heathrow Airport component has most of the border with Buckinghamshire and Surrey and its shape is near-square with a north-east square attached: Hayes and Yeading. Harlington is among the lowest-population components of the seat; with Hayes, it gives its name to a railway station and was also the name of an urban district.

== Constituency profile ==
The south-west is Heathrow Airport, which is the largest single provider of employment including its many associated businesses, such as retail, international distribution, cargo handling and parking throughout the seat and nearby. Housing is overwhelmingly semi-detached houses and mid-rise apartments. The topography is near-flat and features the M4 motorway, mixed-traction Great Western Main Line, and the airport itself. Newer housing in the seat adjoins the Grand Union Canal and reduced pollution is expected from less diesel rolling stock on the main line. The seat has an income level of earnings slightly below national and Greater London averages. Among its working-age population, the most dominant occupation sectors are manufacturing, distribution, self-employed trades and light industry.

Political history since 1997

McDonnell's majority has fluctuated between 25.4% and 41.6% of the votes cast over his runner-up, which in each election has been the Conservative Party's candidate. The 2015 result made the seat the 56th safest of the party's 232 seats (by majority percentage).

2016 EU referendum results

The constituency of Hayes and Harlington voted 58.25% leave versus 41.75% to remain; this is in contrast to the public stance of incumbent MP, John McDonnell, at the time of the referendum.

== History ==
The seat since its 1950 creation has in most elections been quite heavily Labour-voting in relative terms (as with its predecessor in the post war years). In 1981 its Labour MP, Neville Sandelson, defected to the now Liberal-merged Social Democratic Party. (Note: This splinter movement was in part formed from the Labour Party Conference vote, adopted by MPs to oppose the Common Market eight years after the UK joining the European Communities.) In 1983, Sandelson stood for election for the new party, which led to a three-way split in the vote and enabled Conservative Terry Dicks to gain the seat. Dicks retained it in the next two General Elections on marginal majorities (in 1992 being only 53 votes). In 1997, the seat swung heavily back to the Labour candidate McDonnell with his +17.5% swing exceeding that nationally (10% average swing). McDonnell's majorities have ranged between 21.1% and 41.6% of the votes cast.

The constituency shared boundaries with the Hayes and Harlington electoral division for election of councillors to the Greater London Council at elections in 1973, 1977 and 1981. John McDonnell held the seat from 1981 to 1986.

== Boundaries ==
=== Historic ===
Map that gives each named seat and any constant electoral success for national (Westminster) elections for Middlesex, 1955 to 1974.

1950–1974: The Urban District of Hayes and Harlington.

1974–1983: The London Borough of Hillingdon wards of Belmore, Frogmore, Hayes, South, and Yeading.

1983–2010: The London Borough of Hillingdon wards of Barnhill, Botwell, Charville, Crane, Harlington, Heathrow, Townfield, Wood End, and Yeading.

2010–2024: The London Borough of Hillingdon wards of Barnhill, Botwell, Charville, Heathrow Villages, Pinkwell, Townfield, West Drayton, and Yeading.

=== Current ===
Further to the 2023 review of Westminster constituencies, which came into effect for the 2024 general election, the constituency is composed of:

- The London Borough of Hillingdon wards of Belmore, Charville, Hayes Town, Heathrow Villages, Pinkwell, West Drayton, Wood End, and Yeading.

The boundaries were virtually unchanged, with revised ward names reflecting the local authority boundary review which came into effect in May 2022.

== Members of Parliament ==
Election	Member	Party	Notes
1950	Walter Ayles	Labour	
1953 by-election	Arthur Skeffington	Labour	
1971 by-election	Neville Sandelson	Labour	
1981	Neville Sandelson	SDP	
1983	Terry Dicks	Conservative	
1997	John McDonnell	Labour	Shadow Chancellor of the Exchequer (2015–2020)
2024	John McDonnell	Independent	
2025	John McDonnell	Labour	

== Election results ==
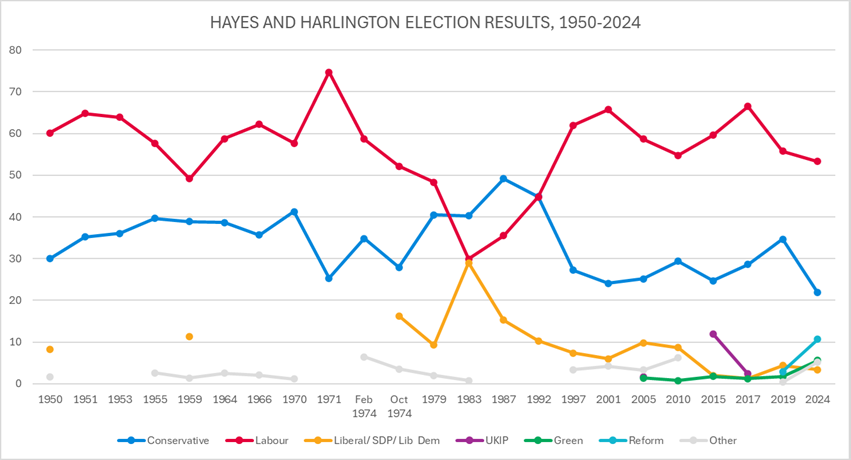
Election results 1950-2024

=== Elections in the 2020s ===
General election 2024: Hayes and Harlington
Party	Candidate	Votes	%	±%
Labour	John McDonnell	20,405	53.3	−2.5
Conservative	Dylan Thomas	8,374	21.9	−12.8
Reform	Francoise Thompson	4,114	10.7	+7.8
Green	Christine West	2,131	5.6	+3.9
Workers Party	Rizwana Karim	1,975	5.2	N/A
Liberal Democrats	Alex Cunliffe	1,316	3.4	−1.0
Majority		12,031	31.4	+10.3
Turnout		38,315	51.5	−8.9
Registered electors		74,404		
Labour hold		Swing	▲5.2	

=== Elections in the 2010s ===
General election 2019: Hayes and Harlington
Party	Candidate	Votes	%	±%
Labour	John McDonnell	24,545	55.8	−10.7
Conservative	Wayne Bridges	15,284	34.7	+6.1
Liberal Democrats	Alexander Cunliffe	1,947	4.4	+3.1
Brexit Party	Harry Boparai	1,292	2.9	New
Green	Christine West	739	1.7	+0.5
CPA	Chika Amadi	187	0.4	New
Majority		9,261	21.1	−16.8
Turnout		43,994	60.8	−4.4
Registered electors		72,356		
Labour hold		Swing	-8.4	

General election 2017: Hayes and Harlington
Party	Candidate	Votes	%	±%
Labour	John McDonnell	31,796	66.5	+6.9
Conservative	Greg Smith	13,681	28.6	+3.9
UKIP	Cliff Dixon	1,153	2.4	−9.6
Liberal Democrats	Bill Newton Dunn	601	1.3	−0.7
Green	John Bowman	571	1.2	−0.6
Majority		18,115	37.9	+3.0
Turnout		47,802	65.2	+5.0
Registered electors		73,268		
Labour hold		Swing	+1.5	

General election 2015: Hayes and Harlington
Party	Candidate	Votes	%	±%
Labour	John McDonnell	26,843	59.6	+4.8
Conservative	Pearl Lewis	11,143	24.7	−4.7
UKIP	Cliff Dixon	5,388	12.0	New
Liberal Democrats	Satnam Kaur Khalsa	888	2.0	−6.7
Green	Alick Munro	794	1.8	+1.0
Majority		15,700	34.9	+9.5
Turnout		45,056	60.2	−0.5
Registered electors		74,874		
Labour hold		Swing	+4.7	

General election 2010: Hayes and Harlington
Party	Candidate	Votes	%	±%
Labour	John McDonnell	23,377	54.8	−3.9
Conservative	Scott Seaman-Digby	12,553	29.4	+4.2
Liberal Democrats	Satnam Kaur Khalsa	3,726	8.7	−1.1
BNP	Chris Forster	1,520	3.6	+1.0
National Front	Andy Cripps	566	1.3	New
English Democrat	Cliff Dixon	464	1.1	New
Green	Jessica Lee	348	0.8	−0.6
Christian	Aneel Shahzad	83	0.2	New
Majority		10,824	25.4	−8.1
Turnout		42,637	60.7	+5.4
Registered electors		70,231		
Labour hold		Swing	-4.1	

=== Elections in the 2000s ===
General election 2005: Hayes and Harlington
Party	Candidate	Votes	%	±%
Labour	John McDonnell	19,009	58.7	−7.0
Conservative	Richard Worrall	8,162	25.2	+1.1
Liberal Democrats	Jon Ball	3,174	9.8	+3.8
BNP	Tony Hazel	830	2.6	+0.4
UKIP	Martin Haley	552	1.7	New
Green	Brian Outten	442	1.4	New
Independent	Paul Goddard	220	0.7	New
Majority		10,847	33.5	−8.1
Turnout		32,389	56.3	0.0
Registered electors		57,449		
Labour hold		Swing	-4.1	

General election 2001: Hayes and Harlington
Party	Candidate	Votes	%	±%
Labour	John McDonnell	21,279	65.7	+3.7
Conservative	Robert McLean	7,813	24.1	−3.1
Liberal Democrats	Nahid Boethe	1,958	6.0	−1.4
BNP	Gary Birch	705	2.2	New
Socialist	Walter Kennedy	648	2.0	New
Majority		13,466	41.6	+6.8
Turnout		32,403	56.3	−16.0
Registered electors		57,561		
Labour hold		Swing	+3.4	

=== Elections in the 1990s ===
General election 1997: Hayes and Harlington
Party	Candidate	Votes	%	±%
Labour	John McDonnell	25,458	62.0	+17.2
Conservative	Andrew Retter	11,167	27.2	−17.7
Liberal Democrats	Tony Little	3,049	7.4	−2.9
Referendum	Frederick Page	778	1.9	New
National Front	John Hutchins	504	1.2	New
All Night Party	Daniel Farrow	135	0.3	New
Majority		14,291	34.8	N/A
Turnout		41,091	72.3	−7.4
Registered electors		56,783		
Labour gain from Conservative		Swing	+17.4	

General election 1992: Hayes and Harlington
Party	Candidate	Votes	%	±%
Conservative	Terry Dicks	19,489	44.9	−4.3
Labour	John McDonnell	19,436	44.8	+9.3
Liberal Democrats	Tony Little	4,472	10.3	New
Majority		53	0.1	−13.7
Turnout		43,397	79.7	+5.2
Registered electors		54,449		
Conservative hold		Swing	-6.8	

=== Elections in the 1980s ===
General election 1987: Hayes and Harlington
Party	Candidate	Votes	%	±%
Conservative	Terry Dicks	21,355	49.2	+8.9
Labour	Peter Fagan	15,390	35.5	+5.6
SDP	Sue Slipman	6,641	15.3	−13.7
Majority		5,965	13.8	+3.4
Turnout		43,386	74.5	+3.6
Registered electors		58,240		
Conservative hold		Swing	+1.6	

General election 1983: Hayes & Harlington
Party	Candidate	Votes	%	±%
Conservative	Terry Dicks	16,451	40.3	−0.2
Labour	Peter Fagan	12,217	29.9	−18.4
SDP	Neville Sandelson	11,842	29.0	New
Freedom	F. Hill	324	0.8	New
Majority		4,234	10.4	N/A
Turnout		40,834	70.9	−4.1
Registered electors		57,620		
Conservative gain from Labour		Swing	+9.3	

=== Elections in the 1970s ===
General election 1979: Hayes & Harlington
Party	Candidate	Votes	%	±%
Labour	Neville Sandelson	20,350	48.30	−3.88
Conservative	Albert Tyrell	17,048	40.47	+12.51
Liberal	Hester Smallbone	3,900	9.26	−7.03
National Front	Gordon Callow	582	1.38	−1.68
Communist	John Mansfield	249	0.59	New
Majority		3,302	7.83	−16.39
Turnout		42,129	75.01	+5.52
Registered electors		56,165		
Labour hold		Swing	-8.20	

General election October 1974: Hayes & Harlington
Party	Candidate	Votes	%	±%
Labour	Neville Sandelson	20,291	52.18	−6.53
Conservative	Neil Balfour	10,871	27.96	−6.85
Liberal	C. Lyon	6,336	16.29	New
National Front	J.S. Fairhurst	1,189	3.06	−3.41
Workers Revolutionary	R. Bull	198	0.51	New
Majority		9,420	24.22	+1.12
Turnout		38,885	69.49	−6.32
Registered electors		55,960		
Labour hold		Swing	+0.2	

General election February 1974: Hayes & Harlington
Party	Candidate	Votes	%	±%
Labour	Neville Sandelson	24,682	58.71	+1.06
Conservative	P.D. Watherston	14,634	34.81	−6.43
National Front	J.S. Fairhurst	2,721	6.47	New
Majority		10,048	23.10	+6.69
Turnout		42,037	75.81	+8.70
Registered electors		55,451		
Labour hold		Swing		

1971 Hayes and Harlington by-election
Party	Candidate	Votes	%	±%
Labour	Neville Sandelson	15,827	74.7	+17.1
Conservative	Andre William Potier	5,348	25.3	−15.98
Majority		10,479	49.4	+32.99
Turnout		21,175	42.3	−24.9
Registered electors		50,766		
Labour hold		Swing		

General election 1970: Hayes and Harlington
Party	Candidate	Votes	%	±%
Labour	Arthur Skeffington	19,192	57.65	−4.56
Conservative	Andre William Potier	13,728	41.24	+5.54
Communist	Peter Pink	372	1.12	−0.98
Majority		5,464	16.41	−10.10
Turnout		33,292	67.11	−5.58
Registered electors		49,609		
Labour hold		Swing		

=== Elections in the 1960s ===
General election 1966: Hayes & Harlington
Party	Candidate	Votes	%	±%
Labour	Arthur Skeffington	20,707	62.21	+3.42
Conservative	Lionel E. Smith	11,883	35.70	−2.94
Communist	Frank Stanley	698	2.10	−0.46
Majority		8,824	26.51	+6.36
Turnout		33,288	72.69	−0.51
Registered electors		45,797		
Labour hold		Swing		

General election 1964: Hayes & Harlington
Party	Candidate	Votes	%	±%
Labour	Arthur Skeffington	20,018	58.79	+9.61
Conservative	Lionel E. Smith	13,158	38.64	+0.62
Communist	Frank Stanley	873	2.56	+1.14
Majority		6,860	20.15	+8.99
Turnout		34,049	73.20	−7.27
Registered electors		46,512		
Labour hold		Swing		

=== Elections in the 1950s ===
General election 1959: Hayes & Harlington
Party	Candidate	Votes	%	±%
Labour	Arthur Skeffington	18,301	49.18	−8.54
Conservative	Anthony Grant	14,149	38.02	−1.64
Liberal	Stanley Gay	4,235	11.38	−1.19
Communist	Francis Foster	527	1.42	New
Majority		4,152	11.16	−6.90
Turnout		37,212	80.47	+3.91
Registered electors		46,244		
Labour hold		Swing		

General election 1955: Hayes & Harlington
Party	Candidate	Votes	%	±%
Labour	Arthur Skeffington	19,558	57.72	−7.07
Conservative	Anthony Courtney	13,440	39.66	+4.45
Communist	Francis Foster	886	2.61	New
Majority		6,118	18.06	−8.80
Turnout		33,884	76.56	−5.64
Registered electors		44,259		
Labour hold		Swing		

1953 Hayes and Harlington by-election
Party	Candidate	Votes	%	±%
Labour	Arthur Skeffington	12,797	63.93	−0.86
Conservative	Anthony Sumption	7,221	36.07	+0.86
Majority		5,576	27.86	−1.72
Turnout		20,018	45.00	−37.20
Registered electors		44,525		
Labour hold		Swing		

General election 1951: Hayes & Harlington
Party	Candidate	Votes	%	±%
Labour	Walter Ayles	23,823	64.79	+4.65
Conservative	Mannas Joel Rantzen	12,949	35.21	+5.21
Majority		10,874	29.58	−0.56
Turnout		36,772	82.20	−2.99
Registered electors		44,737		
Labour hold		Swing		

General election 1950: Hayes & Harlington
Party	Candidate	Votes	%	±%
Labour	Walter Ayles	22,490	60.14	
Conservative	C.C. Vinson	11,218	30.00	
Liberal	John Walter Frank Lett	3,093	8.27	
Communist	Francis Foster	593	1.59	
Majority		11,272	30.14	
Turnout		37,394	85.19	
Registered electors		43,893		
Labour win (new seat)				

== See also ==
- List of parliamentary constituencies in London
