= Verdant =

Verdant may refer to:

- Verdant (think tank), a British think tank
- Verdant Green, fictional undergraduate at Oxford University
- Verdant Power, maker and installer of tidal power and hydroelectric systems
- Verdant universities, an informal group of Australian universities founded in the 1960s and 1970s.
