= Runswick (surname) =

Runswick is an English surname. Notable people with the surname include:

- Daryl Runswick (born 1946), English jazz musician
- Emma Runswick, English medical doctor and trade unionist
