= Leicester South West =

Parliamentary constituency in the United Kingdom, 1950–1974

- Former borough constituency for the House of Commons

1950–February 1974
- Seats: one
- Created from: Leicester South
- Replaced by: Leicester South, Leicester West

Leicester South West was a borough constituency in the city of Leicester. It returned one Member of Parliament (MP) to the House of Commons of the Parliament of the United Kingdom.

The constituency was created for the 1950 general election, and abolished for the February 1974 general election.

== Boundaries ==
The County Borough of Leicester wards of Aylestone, Castle, De Montfort, and North Braunstone.

The constituency included Leicester city centre, which since this seat's abolition in 1974 has been in Leicester South.

== Members of Parliament ==
Election	Member	Party	Notes
1950	Herbert Bowden	Labour	Resigned 1967 to become Chairman of the Independent Television Authority
1967 by-election	Tom Boardman	Conservative	
Feb 1974	constituency abolished		

== Election results ==
=== Elections in the 1950s ===
General election 1950: Leicester South West
Party	Candidate	Votes	%	±%
Labour	Herbert Bowden	23,399	54.61	
Conservative	Dorothy Russell	14,727	34.37	
Liberal	Thomas Allan Pratt	4,720	11.02	
Majority		8,672	20.24	
Turnout		42,846		
Labour win (new seat)				

General election 1951: Leicester South West
Party	Candidate	Votes	%	±%
Labour	Herbert Bowden	24,340	58.39	
Conservative	Edward Harold Wall	17,347	41.61	
Majority		6,993	16.78	
Turnout		41,687	82.54	
Labour hold		Swing		

General election 1955: Leicester South West
Party	Candidate	Votes	%	±%
Labour	Herbert Bowden	21,487	55.83	
Conservative	Dorothy Russell	16,998	44.17	
Majority		4,489	11.66	
Turnout		38,485	76.05	
Labour hold		Swing		

General election 1959: Leicester South West
Party	Candidate	Votes	%	±%
Labour	Herbert Bowden	17,395	46.41	
Conservative	David Walder	14,652	39.09	
Liberal	John W Ward	5,438	14.51	New
Majority		2,743	7.32	
Turnout		37,485	78.48	
Labour hold		Swing		

=== Elections in the 1960s ===
General election 1964: Leicester South West
Party	Candidate	Votes	%	±%
Labour	Herbert Bowden	16,957	49.38	
Conservative	Tom Boardman	12,851	37.42	
Liberal	Thomas Allan Pratt	4,533	13.20	
Majority		4,106	11.96	
Turnout		34,341		
Labour hold		Swing		

General election 1966: Leicester South West
Party	Candidate	Votes	%	±%
Labour	Herbert Bowden	18,822	58.65	
Conservative	Tom Boardman	13,268	41.35	
Majority		5,554	17.30	
Turnout		32,090		
Labour hold		Swing		

1967 Leicester South West by-election
Party	Candidate	Votes	%	±%
Conservative	Tom Boardman	12,897	51.63	+10.28
Labour	Neville Sandelson	8,958	35.86	−22.79
Liberal	Colin J. Beech	3,125	12.51	New
Majority		3,939	15.77	N/A
Turnout		24,980		
Conservative gain from Labour		Swing		

=== Elections in the 1970s ===
General election 1970: Leicester South West
Party	Candidate	Votes	%	±%
Conservative	Tom Boardman	14,611	45.7	+4.4
Labour	Colin Grundy	14,505	45.3	−13.3
Liberal	Joseph T. Roper	2,124	6.6	N/A
National Front	John Kyneston	749	2.3	New
Majority		106	0.4	N/A
Turnout		31,989		
Conservative gain from Labour		Swing		
