= Faiza Shaheen =

British economist (born 1982)

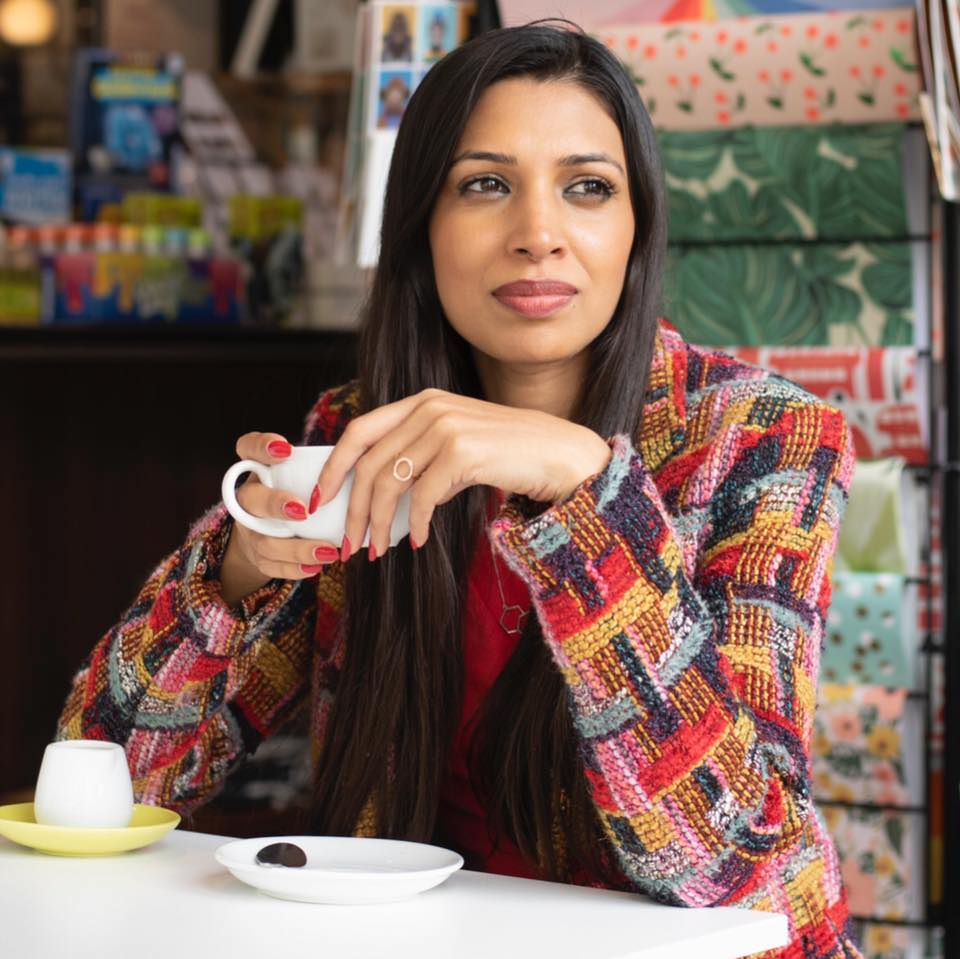
- Shaheen in 2021
- Born: 18 January 1982 (age 44); Leytonstone, London, England
- Education: St John's College, Oxford (BA); University of Manchester (MSc, PhD)
- Occupations: Academic; economist
- Years active: 2006–present
- Employer: London School of Economics
- Notable work: Know Your Place
- Political party: Independent (2024–present)
- Other political affiliations: Labour (2015–2024)
- Spouse: Akin Gazi (m. 2013)
- Children: 1
- Website: faizashaheen.co.uk

Faiza Shaheen (born 18 January 1982) is a British academic and economist in the field of economic inequality.

In 2018, she was selected as the prospective parliamentary candidate for Labour in Chingford and Woodford Green, coming second in the 2019 general election to the incumbent, Iain Duncan Smith. She was again selected by her local party in 2022 to stand in the constituency but was not endorsed by Labour in the July 2024 election. Shaheen stood as an independent in the constituency but was not elected.

In 2023, her first book, Know Your Place, was published.

== Early life and education ==
Shaheen was born in 1982 in Leytonstone in East London and grew up in Chingford. Her father was a car mechanic from Fiji and her mother was a laboratory technician from Karachi, Pakistan, where they met. She has a brother and a sister.

She attended Chingford Church of England Primary School, Chingford Foundation School and Sir George Monoux College in Walthamstow. Her first job was at Greggs in Chingford Mount. After studying philosophy, politics and economics at St John's College, Oxford University, Shaheen studied at the University of Manchester, being awarded an MSc in Research Methods & Statistics and a PhD. Her doctoral thesis (2008) was Identifying 'at-risk' neighbourhoods: Exploring the scope for an Index of Area Vulnerability.

== Career ==
Shaheen first worked at the Centre for Urban Policy Studies, University of Manchester. In 2007, she joined the urban policy research charity, Centre for Cities. In 2009, she became senior researcher on economic inequality at the New Economics Foundation.

In 2014, she was appointed Head of Inequality and Sustainable Development at the charity Save the Children UK. In 2016, Shaheen had a cameo role in the British anthology television series Black Mirror. From 2016 to 2020, she was the director of the Centre for Labour and Social Studies (CLASS), a policy think tank originating from the trade union movement.

Between 2021 and 2023, Shaheen was the Inequality and Exclusion Program Director at the Center on International Cooperation, New York University. In this role, she led the team authoring From Rhetoric to Action: Delivering Equality and Inclusion; its report was launched in September 2021 by seven Heads of State (those of Spain, Sierra Leone, Sweden, Costa Rica, Ireland, New Zealand, and Senegal) as well as Nobel Prize laureate, Joseph Stiglitz and Oscar winner and SDG Advocate, Forest Whitaker, among others. She is a visiting professor at the International Inequalities Institute of the London School of Economics, where she teaches the Masters course on inequality. In May 2025, Shaheen was appointed Executive Director of Tax Justice UK, which campaigns for a fairer tax system that takes more from the very wealthy and redistributes it to tackle inequality.

Shaheen is a regular participant in discussions on television news programmes, including Newsnight and Channel 4 News, has worked with Channel 4 and the BBC to develop documentaries on inequality, and has participated in festival debates, such as the Glastonbury Festival and The World Transformed.

In 2023, Shaheen's first book, Know Your Place, on social inequality in the UK, was published by Simon and Schuster. Shaheen wrote the book during evenings and weekends while working full-time at the LSE.

=== Parliamentary candidacies ===
Shaheen was a longtime Labour voter who said she was politicised from an early age. She joined the Labour Party after Jeremy Corbyn became leader in 2015. In 2017, The Guardian identified her as a "rising star" and she was nominated for Woman of the Year at the Asian Achievers Awards and named one of the Top 100 Influencers on the Left by LBC broadcaster, Iain Dale.

Shaheen was selected as the prospective parliamentary candidate for the Labour Party for Chingford and Woodford Green in July 2018. She has stated that her motivation for standing was the stress her own and other families had suffered as a result of welfare reforms instituted by the constituency's longstanding Conservative incumbent, Iain Duncan Smith, during his time as Secretary of State for Work and Pensions. In the 2019 general election, Shaheen was endorsed by Alastair Campbell, Hugh Grant, Ayesha Hazarika, Ewan Pearson and David Schneider. She increased Labour's vote share, contrary to the national trend, and garnered the party's largest ever vote share in the constituency, coming second by just over one thousand votes.

In July 2022, Shaheen was selected again by her constituency party to contest the seat at the next general election. However, after the announcement of the 2024 general election, the Labour Party declined to endorse her candidacy, citing 'recent social media activity'. According to Shaheen, the posts in question were criticising Israel's actions in Gaza. The Labour Party replaced her with Shama Tatler, a councillor in Brent and member of the pro-Israel Jewish Labour Movement. Shaheen then resigned from the Labour Party and stood as an independent candidate in the constituency.

Shaheen's independent candidacy was endorsed by Ronnie O'Sullivan, the professional snooker player, who lives in the constituency and by 50 members of the local Labour Party. At the election, Iain Duncan Smith retained the seat with just over one third of the votes, while the Labour candidate and Shaheen each secured just over one quarter. Shaheen blamed the incumbent's victory on the Labour Party for deselecting her.

== Personal life ==
Shaheen married actor Akin Gazi in 2013. They have one son, born in 2024. They live in Woodford Green, Woodford, East London.

== Publications ==
- Shaheen, Faiza; Fieldhouse, Ed; Deas, Iain (2008). Identifying 'at risk' neighbourhoods: exploring the scope for and Index of Area Vulnerability. University of Manchester. OCLC 643496958.
- Shaheen, Faiza (2008). The challenge of increasing employment in London (Report). Centre for Cities.
- Shaheen, Faiza (2010). Why the cap won't fit (Report). New Economics Foundation.
- Shaheen, Faiza (2010). Filling the jobs gap (Report). New Economics Foundation.
- Shaheen, Faiza (2011). Why the rich are getting richer (Report). New Economics Foundation.
- Shaheen, Faiza (2011). Ten reasons to care about economic inequality (Report). New Economics Foundation.
- Shaheen, Faiza (2011). Degrees of value (Report). New Economics Foundation.
- Shaheen, Faiza; Kersley, Helen (2011). Improving services for young people (Report). New Economics Foundation.
- Shaheen, Faiza; Kersley, Helen (2012). The economic impact of local and regional pay in the public sector (Report). New Economics Foundation.
- Seaford, Charles; Shaheen, Faiza (2012). Good jobs for non-graduates (Report). New Economics Foundation.
- Shaheen, Faiza; Penny, Joe; Lyall, Sarah (2013). Distant neighbours (Report). New Economics Foundation.
- Shaheen, Faiza (2014). Reducing economic inequality as a sustainable development goal (Report). New Economics Foundation.
- Shaheen, Faiza; Kersley, Helen (2014). Addressing economic inequality at root (Report). New Economics Foundation.
- McDonnell, John, ed. (2018). Economics for the Many. Verso Books.
- Shaheen, Faiza, ed. (2021). From Rhetoric to Action:Delivering Equality & Inclusion (Report). Pathfinders.
- Shaheen, Faiza (2023). Know Your Place. Simon & Schuster. ISBN 978-1-3985-0537-7. OCLC 1264212038.

== Filmography ==
- Black Mirror (2016), Series 3, Episode 6
- Capital in the 21st Century (2019)
