= Economics for the Many =

British book

- Front cover
- Editor: John McDonnell
- Subject: Politics of the United Kingdom
- Genre: Non-fiction
- Publisher: Verso Books
- Publication date: September 2018
- Pages: 236
- ISBN: 9781788732239

Economics for the Many is a 2018 collection of essays edited by the British Labour politician John McDonnell. The book contains left-wing perspectives on topics such as industry, housing, tax and devolution. It was published by Verso Books.

== Synopsis ==
The book is a collection of 16 essays edited by John McDonnell, then serving in the British Labour Party as the Shadow Chancellor of the Exchequer. Figures from McDonnell's New Economics conferences wrote chapters for the book, with contributors including: Grace Blakeley, Francesca Bria, Barry Gardiner, Joe Guinan, Thomas M. Hanna, Antonia Jennings, Rob Calvert Jump, Rebecca Long-Bailey, Paul Mason, Ann Pettifor, J. Christopher Procter, Luke Raikes, Faiza Shaheen, Prem Sikka, Nick Srnicek, Guy Standing and Simon Wren-Lewis. Topics covered include the housing market, nationalisation of industry, international trading, environmentally sound investment in industry, devolution to local authorities and tax avoidance.

== Reception ==
A negative review by Financial Times' Chris Giles criticised that the book is "short of answers" and has a "casual disregard for facts". Giles further commented that the book lacks "an intellectually coherent whole" because of its "inconsistencies and omissions". Terrence Fernsler of Nonprofit World viewed the book as offering a good economic perspective on non-profits, writing that it "describes the consequences of blind faith in the current economic system". Aditya Chakrabortty of The Guardian commented that obstacles to McDonnell's economic goals were "well laid out" in Economics for the Many.

Dagbladet Information's Ben Tarnoff found that the book contained a "number of concrete proposals" (Note: "en række konkrete forslag") but criticised the absence of class struggle. Tarnoff believed the book was "deeply interesting" (Note: "dybt interessante") and gave "excellent overview of the economic ideas behind Corbynism". (Note: "glimrende overblik over de økonomiske ideer bag corbynismen") Luke Savage, writing for Jacobin, argued that the book was "a programmatic sketch of radical left thinking for the twenty-first century". Savage praised its content as "accessible and minimally abstract" and for describing "how real, dynamic, practical alternatives to dominant economic thinking can be imagined and promoted".

In a speech as Chancellor of the Exchequer for the Conservative second Johnson ministry, Rishi Sunak joked that the book was in the genre of "works of fantasy", calling it a "little-read book" as a pun on The Little Red Book.
