= 1953 Hayes and Harlington by-election =

UK Parliamentary by-election

The 1953 Hayes and Harlington by-election was held on 1 April 1953 after the resignation of the Labour MP Walter Ayles. It was won by the Labour candidate Arthur Skeffington.

Hayes and Harlington by-election, 1953
Party	Candidate	Votes	%	±%
Labour	Arthur Skeffington	12,797	63.93	−0.86
Conservative	Anthony Sumption	7,221	36.07	+0.86
Majority		5,576	27.86	−1.71
Turnout		20,018	45.00	−37.20
Registered electors		44,525		
Labour hold		Swing		
