= 1967 Leicester South West by-election =

UK Parliamentary by-election

The 1967 Leicester South West by-election of 2 November 1967 was held after the resignation of Labour MP Herbert Bowden.

The seat was seen as safe, having been won by Labour at the 1966 United Kingdom general election by over 5,500 votes However, like many other by-elections during this Parliament, the Labour Party saw a steep decline in its support and the Conservative candidate Thomas Boardman gained the seat with a majority of nearly 4,000 votes.

== Candidates ==
- The Conservatives adopted Thomas Boardman, a Lieutenant-Colonel who had served in the Second World War.
- Neville Sandelson for Labour was a barrister and one time member of the London County Council
- The local Liberal Party association nominated Colin Beech

== Result of the previous general election ==
General election 1966: Leicester South West
Party	Candidate	Votes	%	±%
Labour	Herbert Bowden	18,822	58.65	
Conservative	Thomas Boardman	13,268	41.35	
Majority		5,554	17.30	
Turnout		32,090		
Labour hold		Swing		

== Result of the by-election ==
Leicester South West by-election, 2 November 1967
Party	Candidate	Votes	%	±%
Conservative	Thomas Boardman	12,897	51.63	+10.28
Labour	Neville Sandelson	8,958	35.86	−22.79
Liberal	Colin Joseph Beech	3,125	12.51	New
Majority		3,939	15.77	N/A
Turnout		24,980		
Conservative gain from Labour		Swing		
