= Anthony Sumption =

British submarine commander (1919–2008)

Anthony James Chadwick Sumption DSC VRD (15 May 1919 – 8 January 2008) was a British tax lawyer and Royal Navy submarine commander during the Second World War.

== Early life ==
Sumption was born at Bishop's Stortford. His father, John Chadwick Sumption (1880-1944), was a journalist who wrote for trade journals, and his mother was Winifred Fanny Sumption.

He was educated at Cheltenham College, where he joined the Royal Naval Volunteer Reserve. After leaving school, he began training as an articled clerk, and then decided to study law at the London School of Economics.

== War service ==
Sumption was called up for active service during the German annexation of the Sudetenland in 1938, but stood down later that year after the Munich Agreement. He returned to his studies at the LSE, but was called up again in 1940 after outbreak of the Second World War. He volunteered to serve as a submariner in 1941, and trained on HMS L26, HMS P552 and HMS P555. He was commissioned in the Royal Navy, becoming a Lieutenant in January 1942, and promoted First Lieutenant of HMS Trident (N52) in May 1943. In February 1944, Sumption and his captain, Lieutenant Commander Peter Newstead, were awarded the Distinguished Service Cross for "outstanding courage, skill and undaunted devotion to duty in successful patrols in H.M. Submarine Trident".

From August 1944 to June 1945, he commanded HMS Varangian (P61). He served as flag lieutenant to Vice Admiral Victor Crutchley, Flag Officer Gibraltar and Mediterranean Approaches, for six months until he was demobilised in 1946 and returned again to his studies. He remained an officer in the RNVR, and was promoted to lieutenant commander in 1950. He was awarded the Volunteer Reserve Decoration in 1953 and finally retired from naval service in 1955.

== Legal career ==
Sumption qualified as a solicitor in 1946, building a small commercial and banking law practice and eventually specialising in the highly lucrative area of tax law. By 1964, he had become bored with being a solicitor and decided to become a barrister, In addition to his advocacy work, he wrote books on tax law, and spent five years as a part-time judge, before retiring in 1986.

== Other activities ==
Sumption and Humphry Berkeley jointly established a small merchant bank, Sumption Berkeley, in the 1960s. He was also the chairman of two publicly listed companies: Great Swan Investments and Allied Investments. Sumption sold his interest in the bank in 1971.

He was involved in politics in the 1950s and 1960s, serving as a Conservative member of London County Council, representing Fulham East from 1949 to 1952, and of Westminster City Council from 1953 to 1956. He stood for Parliament at the Hayes and Harlington by-election in 1953, losing to the Labour candidate Arthur Skeffington, and for Middlesbrough West in the 1964 general election but was defeated by the Labour incumbent, Jeremy Bray. He was chairman of the Conservative Political Centre.

== Private life ==
Sumption married Hilda Hedigan in 1946. They met in Gibraltar, where she was serving with the Women's Royal Naval Service. Their marriage was dissolved in 1979.

He moved to the South of France after he retired, living at La Croix-Valmer near Saint-Tropez, where he enjoyed boating and painting. He returned to London in 2001.

Among many close friends were William Rees-Mogg and Humphry Berkeley who were godparents to two of his children.

He was survived by two sons and two daughters. His elder son, Jonathan Sumption, upon appointment as a Justice of the Supreme Court of the United Kingdom in 2012 became Lord Sumption.

== Decorations ==
- – Distinguished Service Cross (DSC)
- – Volunteer Reserve Decoration (VRD)

== Publications ==
- Lawton, John Phillip (author) & Sumption, Anthony (editor). Tax and Tax Planning. London: Oyez (1980) ISBN 978-0-85120-525-0
- Sumption, Anthony. Taxation of Overseas Incomes and Gains. London: Butterworth (1975). ISBN 978-0-406-53871-0
- Sumption, Anthony & Clarke, Giles. Capital Gains Tax. London: Butterworths Tolley Ltd (1991). ISBN 978-0-406-99840-8

== Notes and sources ==
Notes

Sources

- "Obituaries: Anthony Sumption". The Daily Telegraph. London. 7 February 2008.
- "Obituary: Anthony Sumption". The Times.
- "Supplement to the London Gazette, 22 February 1944". The London Gazette (36390). London: 903. 14 February 1944.
- Irvine, Ian (15 October 2011). "Jonathan Sumption: Donnish but deadly". The Independent. London: Independent Print Ltd.
- "Who's Who: Sumption, Anthony James Chadwick". Oxford University Press. 1 December 2007. doi:10.1093/ww/9780199540884.013.U36690.
