= 1971 Hayes and Harlington by-election =

UK Parliamentary by-election

The 1971 Hayes and Harlington by-election of 17 June 1971 was held after the death of Labour Member of Parliament (MP) Arthur Skeffington. The seat was retained by Labour.

== Result ==
Hayes and Harlington by-election, 1971
Party	Candidate	Votes	%	±%
Labour	Neville Sandelson	15,827	74.7	+17.1
Conservative	Andre William Potier	5,348	25.3	−15.98
Majority		10,479	49.4	+32.99
Turnout		21,175	42.3	−24.9
Registered electors		50,766		
Labour hold		Swing		

== Previous result ==
General election 1970: Hayes and Harlington
Party	Candidate	Votes	%	±%
Labour	Arthur Skeffington	19,192	57.65	−4.56
Conservative	Andre William Potier	13,728	41.24	+5.54
Communist	Peter Pink	372	1.12	−0.98
Majority		5,464	16.41	−10.10
Turnout		33,292	67.11	−5.58
Registered electors		49,609		
Labour hold		Swing		
