= Walter Ayles =

British politician

- Ayles in 1927 by Lafayette © National Portrait Gallery

Member of Parliament for Hayes and Harlington Southall (1945–1950)
- In office 26 July 1945 – 31 January 1953
- Preceded by: Constituency established
- Succeeded by: Arthur Skeffington

Member of Parliament for Bristol North
- In office 30 May 1929 – 27 October 1931
- Preceded by: Frederick Guest
- Succeeded by: Robert Bernays
- In office 6 December 1923 – 29 October 1924
- Preceded by: Henry Guest
- Succeeded by: Frederick Guest

Personal details
- Born: 24 April 1879
- Died: 6 July 1953 (aged 74)
- Party: Labour
- Occupation: Politician

Walter Henry Ayles (24 March 1879 – 6 July 1953) was a British Labour Party politician who served as a Member of Parliament (MP) for 11 years between 1923 and 1953.

== Early life ==
Ayles was born in Lambeth into a poor religious family. At age 13 he became an engineering apprentice at the London and South Western Railway. Working in Birmingham he met Bertha Batt from Worle, Somerset, and they married in 1904 in Axbridge.

== Political career ==
In 1910 Ayles became a full-time organiser for the Independent Labour Party in Bristol. He was elected a Councillor on Bristol City Council for the Easton ward in 1910. In 1913 he joined the committee responsible for running the Port of Bristol and Avonmouth Docks.

Ayles was a Methodist lay-preacher and a temperance campaigner.

One of the founding group of the No-Conscription Fellowship in November 1914, early in the First World War, he was a member of its national committee and a signatory of the Repeal the Act (Military Service Act 1916) leaflet, which resulted in the committee members being prosecuted under the Defence of the Realm Act, a number of them, including Ayles, being imprisoned for two months. He was also imprisoned as a conscientious objector, and served as secretary of the No More War Movement, 1931–1932.

He had been selected by Bristol East ILP to be their candidate for the 1918 General Election. but was replaced prior to the campaign. He was Member of Parliament for Bristol North from 1923 to 1924 and from 1929 to 1931; for Southall from 1945 to 1950; and for Hayes and Harlington from 1950 until he resigned his seat, on account of failing health, on 31 January 1953, by accepting the post of Steward of the Manor of Northstead. Ayles died that July, aged 74.

Ayles Road, a street in Yeading, which formed part of his constituency, is named after him. Several nearby roads are also named after important people in the history of the Labour Party.

Parliament of the United Kingdom
Preceded by Henry Guest	Member of Parliament for Bristol North; 1923–1924	Succeeded by Freddie Guest
Preceded by Freddie Guest	Member of Parliament for Bristol North; 1929–1931	Succeeded by Robert Bernays
New constituency	Member of Parliament for Southall; 1945–1950	Succeeded by George Pargiter
New constituency	Member of Parliament for Hayes and Harlington; 1950–1953	Succeeded by Arthur Skeffington
Party political offices
Preceded by Geoffrey Ramsay	South West member of the National Administrative Council of the Independent Labour Party; 1914–1927	Succeeded by Fred Berriman
