= Terry Dicks =

British politician (1937–2020)

Member of Parliament for Hayes and Harlington
- In office 9 June 1983 – 8 April 1997
- Preceded by: Neville Sandelson
- Succeeded by: John McDonnell

Personal details
- Born: Terence Patrick Dicks; 17 March 1937 Bristol, England
- Died: 17 June 2020 (aged 83) Bournemouth, England
- Party: Conservative
- Spouse: Janet Cross
- Children: 4
- Education: University of Oxford (DipEcon); London School of Economics (BSc)

Terence Patrick "Phil" Dicks (17 March 1937 – 17 June 2020) was a British Conservative Party politician. He was MP for the constituency of Hayes and Harlington from the 1983 general election until his retirement at the 1997 general election, having unsuccessfully contested Bristol South in 1979. He obtained the nickname Phil for, according to The Telegraph, "elevating Philistinism to an art form".

== Early life and career ==
Dicks was born with cerebral palsy on 17 March 1937 in Bristol to Frank and Winifred Dicks. He saw little of his father", who "did not play a part in his childhood"; his mother, a cleaner, died of arthritis. Leaving school at 15, he worked at Imperial Tobacco as a clerk until 1959, then at the Ministry of Labour. He was educated at the London School of Economics, where he graduated BSc (Econ). He also held a University of Oxford Diploma in Economics, awarded after a summer school course in 1966.

== Political career ==
=== Before parliament ===
Dicks was elected to Hillingdon Borough Council in 1974. In 1978, as housing committee chairman, he attracted controversy after he offered hostel accommodation to a white Rhodesian family but sent an Asian family "in a taxi to the Foreign Office" despite the fact that both had arrived in the UK as immigrants. Dicks maintained the Asian family's grounds for staying were "unconvincing while the Rhodesians’ case was not." He was suspended in 1982 when the Greater London Council took issue with comments he made regarding arrears from the Strongbridge Housing Association.

Dicks was selected as the Conservative Party's candidate for the seat of Bristol South in the 1979 general election, but he lost to Labour's Michael Cocks.

=== Member of Parliament ===
Dicks was elected as the Member of Parliament for Hayes and Harlington in 1983 in succession to Labour's Neville Sandelson. He was known for his hardline right-wing views and caused controversy over several public statements he made. His strong opposition to state funding for the arts inspired Labour MP Tony Banks to claim, in a February 1990 debate, that Dicks' presence in the House of Commons was "living proof that a pig's bladder on a stick can get elected to Parliament."

In another arts funding debate in July that year, his remarks were controversial enough for fellow Conservative MP Patrick Cormack, in a heated House of Commons, to say, "This man is a disgrace to the House of Commons." Dicks replied, "My hon. Friend the Member for Staffordshire, South reminds me of Henry VIII not with all the doublet and hose, but at least well fed."

Regarding Derrick Gregory, a man with learning disabilities who had been sentenced to death in Malaysia for drug smuggling, Dicks said he would be writing to the Malaysian government congratulating it on its approach. On Farzad Bazoft, an Observer journalist hanged by Saddam Hussein in 1990, Dicks said he "deserved to be hanged" on the eve of his execution.

In 1990, when Nelson Mandela declined to meet the then Prime Minister Margaret Thatcher on a trip to London, a greatly offended Dicks asked, rhetorically, "How much longer will the Prime Minister allow herself to be kicked in the face by this black terrorist?"

As an MP and a member of the Conservative Family Campaign, Dicks left a legacy as a critic of high-profile HIV/AIDS awareness campaigns at the time of the emergence of the disease in the 1980s. Frequent controversial jokes furthering these opinions and others – such as suggesting "tell 'em that if you shove your willy [British slang term for a penis] up someone's bum you're going to catch more than a cold" as a central message of the government's HIV/AIDS campaign (instead of encouraging gay men to use condoms), descriptions of immigrants to Britain as "the flotsam and jetsam from all over the world," and ridiculing a Somali refugee family buying water in a London supermarket, saying "where they come from they're happy to drink out of puddles" – fuelled protests, according to the Socialist Worker.

In 1989 Dicks called for the BBC soap opera EastEnders to be cancelled or screened after 11pm, following a storyline involving a gay kiss between two men.

He was also supportive of measures to decrease periods for abortion.

Dicks did not stand again at the 1997 general election. His Labour successor, left-winger John McDonnell, described him as a "stain," a "malignant creature," and an espouser of racism in his maiden speech in 1997.

== Later career ==
From 1999 until he retired in June 2009, Dicks was a member of Surrey County Council, representing the town of Addlestone. Beginning in 2011, he was a Runnymede district councillor for Chertsey South and Row Town.

== Personal life ==
Due to his cerebral palsy, Dicks referred to himself in the House of Commons as a "spastic".

He had four children – three daughters and a son – across two marriages. He died on 17 June 2020, aged 83, reported to be from complications of dementia.

Parliament of the United Kingdom
Preceded by Neville Sandelson	Member of Parliament for Hayes and Harlington; 1983–1997	Succeeded by John McDonnell
