= Derrick Gregory =

English drug smuggler

- Born: 1949; Ealing, London, England
- Died: 21 July 1989 (aged 39); Pudu Prison, Kuala Lumpur, Malaysia
- Known for: Third Westerner hanged under Malaysian anti-drug laws despite having an intellectual disability
- Criminal charges: Drug smuggling
- Criminal penalty: Capital punishment by hanging
- Children: 1

Derrick Gregory (1949 – 21 July 1989) was an English drug smuggler who was hanged in Malaysia in 1989.

Gregory became the third Westerner to be hanged under Malaysia's tough anti-drugs laws. His hanging was carried out three years after the Barlow and Chambers execution. Some reports described him as being the first Briton to be hanged under Malaysia's drugs laws, but Kevin Barlow had joint Australian–British nationality.

Controversy surrounded Gregory's case due to evidence of his intellectual disability since childhood.

== Background ==
A painter and decorator, Derrick Gregory was mentally subnormal as a result of childhood illness. Having spent much of his youth in special schools, it was reported that Gregory had some form of brain damage and acted "like a robot". He had a previous criminal conviction for the attempted theft of a train from Charing Cross station, London.

Gregory was arrested on 7 October 1982 at an airport in Penang with over a pound of heroin found in his boots and clothes. At the trial, the court in Penang was told Gregory had 14 packets of the drug in his boots and four packets in his underwear. He was attempting to board a plane for Singapore en route to Los Angeles when he was arrested.

In December 1986, the British television station Channel Four broadcast a documentary on the case entitled 'No Man Wants to Die' as part of its Twenty Twenty Vision series. It was produced by the journalist Andrew Drummond. As part of the programme, a British-based psychiatrist was flown out to Malaysia to examine Gregory. Drummond said that the examination revealed that Gregory had an enlarged brain cavity and had done since he was about four years old.

Gregory contested in court that he was instructed by former car salesman Paul Dye, whom he had known for several years and owed £1,000 to, to meet contacts of his in Penang. Gregory stated that he believed he was sent there to help smuggle car parts and diamonds, and that he had never been involved with drugs before and did not know what heroin looked like prior to the day of his arrest. Gregory testified that was forced to smuggle the drugs after death threats from two men he met in Penang, who were members of a drug syndicate.

Dye was serving a 28-year prison sentence in England for his part in a drug smuggling operation which saw him branded as "devious, greedy and utterly unscrupulous" by Judge James Rant.

== Trial ==
Gregory was defended by Rasiah Rajasingham, who argued that expert evidence from psychiatrists who had examined Gregory proved that the defendant had a serious personality disorder. He said experts had shown that Gregory was a vulnerable person and easily influenced. However, the judge, Mohamed Dzaiddin Abdullah, rejected this and sentenced him to death. The judge said that it was his "finding that you merely suffer from a personality disorder characterized by your immaturity and anti-social behavior," he said, dismissing defence arguments that the Briton was mentally too unstable to be fully responsible for his actions.

=== Appeals for clemency ===
Despite her personal support for capital punishment, British Prime Minister Margaret Thatcher appealed to the Malaysia government to commute the sentence, to no avail. Gregory's local Member of Parliament, Barney Hayhoe, acknowledged that drug trafficking was an evil trade, but the particular circumstances merited a more compassionate and merciful treatment. However, Hayhoe's fellow Conservative Party MP Terry Dicks said he would be writing to the Malaysian government congratulating it on its approach.

=== Execution ===
Gregory was executed by hanging at dawn on 21 July 1989 at Kajang Prison.

== Family ==
Gregory married Carole Cunnington in Hounslow in 1980, with whom he had a daughter, Tara, the same year. They were separated, with Gregory not having seen his daughter (who was 8 at the time of his death) since she was an infant. It was reported that in the hours before his execution, Gregory clutched a photo of his daughter. Whilst in prison, he had received visits from his parents, Kenneth and Mary Gregory and also his brother Paul.
