= Tom Boardman, Baron Boardman =

British politician (1919–2003)

The Right Honourable The Lord Boardman MC TD DL
- Portrait by Nick Sinclair, 1992

Member of the House of Lords
- Lord Temporal
- Life peerage 10 July 1980 – 10 March 2003

Chief Secretary to the Treasury
- In office 8 January 1974 – 4 March 1974
- Prime Minister: Edward Heath
- Chancellor: Anthony Barber
- Preceded by: Patrick Jenkin
- Succeeded by: Joel Barnett

Member of Parliament for Leicester South
- In office 28 February 1974 – 20 September 1974
- Preceded by: Constituency created
- Succeeded by: Jim Marshall

Member of Parliament for Leicester South West
- In office 2 November 1967 – 8 February 1974
- Preceded by: Herbert Bowden
- Succeeded by: Constituency abolished

Personal details
- Born: Thomas Gray Boardman; 12 January 1919 Daventry, England
- Died: 10 March 2003 (aged 84) Northampton, England

Military service
- Branch/service: British Army
- Rank: Lieutenant colonel
- Battles/wars: World War II

Thomas Gray Boardman, Baron Boardman, MC, TD, DL (12 January 1919 – 10 March 2003) was a British Army tank commander, Conservative politician, cabinet minister and chairman of National Westminster Bank Plc.

== Early life ==
Thomas Gray Boardman was born in Daventry on 12 January 1919, just after the end of the First World War. He was educated at Bromsgrove School in Worcestershire (and later in life he became the "President of the School" from 1983 to 1994). His father was a landowner and Lord Mayor of Daventry, who farmed 500 acres in Northamptonshire. Like many of his generation, Boardman's formative years were shaped by the increasingly real prospect of war. On leaving school, Boardman paid £500 to become an articled clerk with a local solicitor, but in 1938, despite an early interest in the law and politics, enlisted into the British Army as a trooper in the 1st Northamptonshire Yeomanry.

== Military service ==
At the start of the World War II, Boardman was selected for training at the Royal Military College, Sandhurst, and commissioned as a Second Lieutenant on 14 September 1940. He was promoted through the ranks to Lieutenant-Colonel and commanded the 1st Battalion Northamptonshire Yeomanry during the North West Europe campaign. He won the Military Cross (MC) in Normandy during Operation Overlord, in the early part of the operation to trap German forces in the Falaise Pocket.

After the D-Day landings in 1944, Boardman was detailed to act as navigator for four armoured columns formed from the Northamptonshire Yeomanry, and 1st Battalion Black Watch. The columns were to take Saint-Aignan-de-Cramesnil, about 20 kilometres south of Caen.

On 6 and 7 August 1944, Boardman conducted reconnaissance in no man's land, despite German fire, to allow him to establish the route in darkness. In the night attack of 7/8 August, he then successfully spearheaded the columns forward through the Falaise Gap towards the village of St Aignan de Cramesnil, several times dismounting from his tank, and going back on foot to find parts of the columns which had lost touch. He had to illuminate the way forward with Very lights, making himself a highly visible target for enemy fire. Having used all his flares, Boardman had to run back to the second tank in the column to find more, in so doing he almost fell into a slit trench full of Germans; but the objective was achieved.

On 8 August 1944, Kurt Meyer, of the SS Hitlerjugend Division, ordered elements of his command to counterattack and recapture the high ground taken by The Allies. Michael Wittmann 'The Black Baron' a notable German Waffen-SS tank commander, led a group of seven Tiger tanks, from the Heavy SS-Panzer Battalion 101, supported by additional tanks and infantry. Boardman, with A Squadron 1st Northamptonshire Yeomanry, ambushed the Tigers crossing open terrain towards the high ground from the tree line. It was Boardman's order to the gunner Joe Ekins, which killed Wittman. According to the historian Hart, Boardman's unit was positioned in a wood on the right flank of the advancing Tiger tanks. At approximately 12:47, they engaged them, halting the attack, and killing Wittmann. Boardman's squadron (of which he was second in command) beat off the heavy counter-attack and the citation for his Military Cross gives much of the credit for this, and the destruction of 12 German tanks, to him. His MC was gazetted on 21 December 1944.

Boardman was later the commanding officer of the Northamptonshire Yeomanry, when they became part of the Territorial Army.

== Political service ==
At the end of the World War II, Boardman took his law exams at Gibson & Wheldon (subsequently renamed The University of Law) and passed out top. He qualified and practised as a solicitor in Northampton, and served on the boards of several companies; his sound judgment made him a valued contributor to business as director. He became the Finance Director of Allied Breweries and, in 1958, he became chairman of Chamberlain Phipps, the Wellingborough manufacturer of adhesives, insulation, cladding and footwear components. He held this position until 1978.

Boardman's interest in Conservative politics brought his adoption as the Conservative candidate for Leicester South-West, where he fought Labour's Chief Whip, Herbert Bowden, in the 1964 and 1966 elections. Bowden was elevated to the House of Lords in 1967 and Boardman, at the age of 48, then won the parliamentary seat in a sensational by-election beating the Labour candidate Neville Sandelson and turning a Labour majority into a Conservative majority of 3,939 (15.7 per cent).

It was a period of considerable Conservative success and Boardman consolidated his hold on the seat. In 1970, he beat off a fierce Labour challenge by just 106 votes. By then, his fellow Conservatives had already elected him to the executive of the 1922 Committee and he was chairman of the parliamentary panel of the Institute of Directors. Business commitments prevented him accepting the first government job offered to him, as Principal Private Secretary to Margaret Thatcher.

Boardman's skills had been rapidly recognised by the incoming Conservative government of Edward Heath in 1970. He quickly earned a reputation for speaking publicly only about subjects that he knew well, particularly in the realms of industry and commerce. In April 1972, he was made Minister for Industry at the Department of Trade and Industry, where he was seen by many as a powerful advocate of progress in industry. Heath brought Boardman in to help take forward the industrial expansion programme, in a reshuffle which followed the unveiling of the Industry Bill. This was Heath's notorious 'U-turn' on industrial policy, in which a free market approach was abandoned in favour of a return to intervention, subsidy for 'lame ducks' and price controls.

Following the 1972 miners' strike, Boardman steered the Coal Industry Act through Parliament; it injected huge subsidies to keep the National Coal Board solvent. Having achieved a record pay award as part of that settlement, the miners were quiescent until the summer of 1973, when they demanded another 35 per cent.

Boardman and his fellow junior minister, Peter Emery, represented the government in the negotiations that followed, in which the National Coal Board tabled a formula which offered the maximum allowed by Heath's "Stage Three" pay code, plus a further slice linked to productivity. This left no room at all for further negotiation from the National Coal Board 's side. But any hope that the miners' leader, Joe Gormley, could persuade his executive to accept it was ended by the machinations of his hard-Left colleague Mick McGahey, who told Heath that he wanted to see the government fall. Although others have criticised the National Coal Board for offering the miners too much too soon, Boardman always defended them, believing that the legislation made that inevitable and that any concessions would have to be found outside the code. He was also clear that if the mineworkers were made a special case, other unions would have been forced to exploit it. He had in mind Frank Chapple at the EETPU, who told him bluntly that, "if those buggers get a farthing more" than his own workers, he could stop the country in 48 hours. Boardman took part in the talks with the miners and he evidently impressed Heath.

Meanwhile, war had broken out in the Middle East, and Arab oil producers had dramatically raised the price of oil. This strengthened the miners' hand, and in November they instigated an overtime ban. With both oil and coal supplies threatened, the government declared a State of Emergency. In an atmosphere of extreme tension, Boardman bore the brunt of administering the emergency measures, which involved a ban on non-essential uses of electricity and restrictions on heating in shops and offices.

There was also a plan to cut heating in schools. But the education secretary, Margaret Thatcher, who had heard the news on a radio programme, had not been consulted. Furious, she stormed into Boardman's office. "After what the diplomats would describe as frank exchanges, [I] had it stopped," she recalled in her memoirs.

According to an obituarist, Boardman was "admired for his calmness under fire". He reassured the public that power-station coal stocks would hold out through the winter; and, when a row broke out about possible petrol rationing, he played down his ministry's preparations as "purely administrative action … officials are looking to see whether the mice have eaten the ration books".

He was frequently called to Downing Street to take part in talks with leaders of the National Union of Mineworkers, and with representatives of the oil sheikdoms. And he set an example at the height of the shortages by exchanging his ministerial car for a smaller model. He also made a point of letting it be known that he had turned down the thermostat on his oil-fired central heating.

Boardman showed his steel when he refused the gas workers a court of inquiry over their industrial dispute against Stage II of the prices and incomes policy: "There is nothing to inquire into," he told the Commons. He ran energy policy during the first great oil shock until Heath, against the wishes of both Lord Peter Walker and Boardman, decided that there should be a new energy ministry.

Boardman was described by an admirer as "a politician of charm and ability", noted for his loyalty and for the meticulousness with which he prepared his case and redrafted every statement or document emanating from his office. He was also a very patient listener to the problems of industry, at a time of soaring costs and shop floor militancy. His only fault, according to his ministerial boss, Lord Walker, was that "he worked too hard and worried too much ... I had great difficulty in seeing that Tom got enough sleep and relaxation at weekends". His success as a minister was illustrated by his promotion to the post of Chief Secretary to the Treasury in the dying days of the Heath government, but a long career on the front bench was denied him by the defeat of the Government in the February 1974 election and the loss of his own seat to the Labour Party's Jim Marshall in October 1974. Boardman had been a well-liked and respected Member of Parliament but, with his party back in opposition, his mainstream political career had come to an end.

== Businessman ==
Boardman rejoined the Allied Breweries board in 1974, rising to vice-chairman the next year. He also became joint honorary treasurer of the Conservative Party, a post he held until 1982. He managed to buy the Tory central office site at Smith Square from Westminster council for £1.32m - enabling it to be sold for three times the amount only two years later. He was president of the Association of British Chambers of Commerce for three years from 1977 and served on the council of the Confederation of British Industry.

Boardman remained politically involved. Announced in the 1980 Birthday Honours, he was created a life peer as Baron Boardman, of Welford in the County of Northamptonshire on 10 July 1980.

In 1978, Boardman became chairman of the building materials group Steetley Industries (he had been a director since 1975), the construction materials group.

In 1979, Boardman joined the board of the National Westminster Bank and followed Lord Kingsdown (who became Governor of the Bank of England) into the chair in 1983. This was a period in which NatWest was overtaking Barclays to become the market leader in High Street banking, and pursuing grand ambitions, notably in investment banking and in North America. "Our philosophy is, and was, and remains that we are going to be a major player in the global market," Boardman proclaimed in 1988 Changes at National Westminster during the Boardman era included returning to Saturday opening in 1985 after 16 years; waiving charges on current accounts in credit; becoming involved in the International Stock Exchange through the “Big Bang” deregulation of 1986; meeting the requirements of the 1986 Financial Services Act; and taking over First Jersey National Corporation of the US. In 1988 National Westminster's shares were listed on the Tokyo stock exchange for the first time. Boardman's avowed technique was to support his management team without getting involved in day-to-day management.

In his decade with what was then the biggest high street bank, Boardman helped make Natwest the country's most profitable and dynamic. Unhappily though, some of his subordinates cut corners, notably at County NatWest, whose handling of the Blue Arrow takeover of Manpower was savaged by inspectors at the Department of Trade and Industry - to Boardman's fury. Three top executives resigned, and Boardman stepped down three months early in 1989. Although not personally implicated in the fraud, and ignorant of any wrongdoing, Boardman chose to resign a few months before his term of office was due to end.

Boardman was chairman of the committee of London & Scottish Clearing Bankers from 1987 in the last two years of a very successful term of office until his resignation from NatWest in 1989. He was also a director of MEPC, the property company. In 1993, at the instigation of NatWest and other banks, he became chairman of Heron International, the troubled property group created by Gerald Ronson.

In retirement, Boardman was active in the House of Lords almost until his death. He found more time to enjoy his life in Welford, Northamptonshire. A skilled horseman, he had ridden in earlier days in military steeplechases. He hunted with the Pytchley until he was well into his seventies, retiring only when his faithful mount Bramble became too old to continue. Boardman lived in Northamptonshire all his life, becoming Deputy Lieutenant of the county in 1977, and High Sheriff of Northamptonshire in 1979. He was awarded honorary doctorates by Nottingham and City universities. Among his many charitable works, Boardman was chairman of the national appeal for the Prince's Youth Business Trust.

== Legal significance ==
Boardman is also noteworthy in being the appellant in Boardman v Phipps [1967] 2 AC 46 (House of Lords) a leading case on fiduciary duty and constructive trusts. Although he was ultimately required to account to the trust for additional benefits that accrued from his actions, the courts commended him for the service he had delivered to the beneficiaries, to whom the court held he owed fiduciary duties. Whilst he lost and would technically have had to account for the profits, Boardman was allowed in fact to keep the greater part of the profit as reward for his service.

== Personal life ==
In 1948 Lord Boardman married, as her second husband, Deirdre Chaworth-Musters (née Gough) (1923-2014), and the couple had two sons and a daughter together. (Lady Boardman already had another daughter, born in 1943, by her first marriage.) The younger son, Sir Nigel Patrick Gray Boardman, built a successful legal career with Slaughter and May in London. Nigel Boardman came to wider public attention in July 2021 as the compiler of a preliminary report commissioned by English leaders into aspects of the so-called Greensill scandal, involving David Cameron, Lex Greensill and others.

Tom Boardman's daughter Grania Janet Gray Boardman married Rupert Law, 9th Baron Ellenborough.

== Arms ==
Coat of arms of Tom Boardman, Baron Boardman
Coronet A Coronet of a Baron Crest A demi-horse Argent maned crined and hooved Or about its neck by the strings a purse Azure tasselled Gold. Escutcheon Azure on a fess embattled between in chief two horses salient and in base a boar's head couped Argent three roses Gules barbed and seeded Proper. Supporters Dexter a lion reguardant Or head and mane Gules gorged with a collar Sable bezanty, sinister a horse rampant Argent maned crined and hooved Or and gorged with a similar collar Sable bezanty. Motto Aperta Mihi Via

Parliament of the United Kingdom
Preceded by Herbert Bowden	Member of Parliament for Leicester South West; 1967–February 1974	Constituency abolished
New constituency	Member of Parliament for Leicester South; February 1974–October 1974	Succeeded by Jim Marshall
Political offices
Preceded by Patrick Jenkin	Chief Secretary to the Treasury; 1974	Succeeded by Joel Barnett
Honorary titles
Preceded by Leslie Michael MacDonald Saunders Watson	High Sheriff of Northamptonshire; 1979	Succeeded by R.H.N. Dashwood
