= Neville Sandelson =

British politician (1923–2002)

Member of Parliament for Hayes and Harlington
- In office 17 June 1971 – 9 June 1983
- Preceded by: Arthur Skeffington
- Succeeded by: Terry Dicks

Personal details
- Born: 27 November 1923 Leeds, West Riding of Yorkshire, England
- Died: 12 January 2002 (aged 78) Beziers, France
- Party: Labour (before 1981, 1996–2002); SDP (1981–87)
- Education: Westminster School
- Alma mater: Trinity College, Cambridge

Neville Devonshire Sandelson (27 November 1923 – 12 January 2002) was a British politician.

== Early life ==
Sandelson was educated at Westminster School and Trinity College, Cambridge. He was a barrister, called to the bar by Inner Temple in 1946, and director of a publishing company. He was elected to the London County Council in 1952, representing Stoke Newington and Hackney North and was a council member of Toynbee Hall and the Fabian Society.

== Parliamentary career ==
Sandelson unsuccessfully attempted to enter Parliament many times before he finally gained election. He contested Ashford in 1950, 1951 and 1955, the Beckenham by-election in 1957 and Rushcliffe in 1959. He might have won the seat of Heston and Isleworth at the 1966 general election from Reader Harris, its Conservative MP, had it not been for a strong Liberal vote. Additionally he also lost the Leicester South West seat in a 1967 by-election, and finally fought Chichester at the subsequent election.

He was elected Labour Party Member of Parliament (MP) for Hayes and Harlington in a 1971 by-election. Later in the decade he survived a number of attempts to de-select him and seemed to relish the role of the beleaguered right-wing Labour MP. In October 1980 he was so unhappy at the Labour Party Conference's support for unilateral disarmament that he announced that he would vote with the Tories on all defence issues. In 1981, he was among the Labour MPs who defected to the new Social Democratic Party (SDP). Sandelson later said that he had decided to join the party months before, and had voted for Michael Foot in the 1980 Labour Party leadership election in order to ensure Labour had an unelectable leader.

== After Parliament ==
In the 1983 general election he lost his seat, polling 29% of the vote, although he almost pushed Labour into third place which allowed the Conservative candidate Terry Dicks to win. During the 1987 general election he did not stand, and endorsed a number of Conservative candidates as a means of defeating Labour – though the list included Chris Patten, whose seat was a prime SDP–Liberal Alliance target which Labour had no chance of winning. His unwillingness to recant these endorsements led to his expulsion from the SDP. Despite these activities he was allowed to rejoin the Labour Party in 1996, then under the leadership of Tony Blair, who appealed to Sandelson's centrist values. He stayed with Labour until his death in 2002 aged 78.

== Bibliography ==
- Times Guide to the House of Commons, 1955, 1966 & 1983
- Leigh Rayment's Historical List of MPs
- Obituary, The Independent, 16 January 2002.

Parliament of the United Kingdom
Preceded by Arthur Skeffington	Member of Parliament for Hayes and Harlington; 1971–1983	Succeeded by Terry Dicks
