= John McDonnell =

British politician (born 1951)

The Right Honourable John McDonnell MP
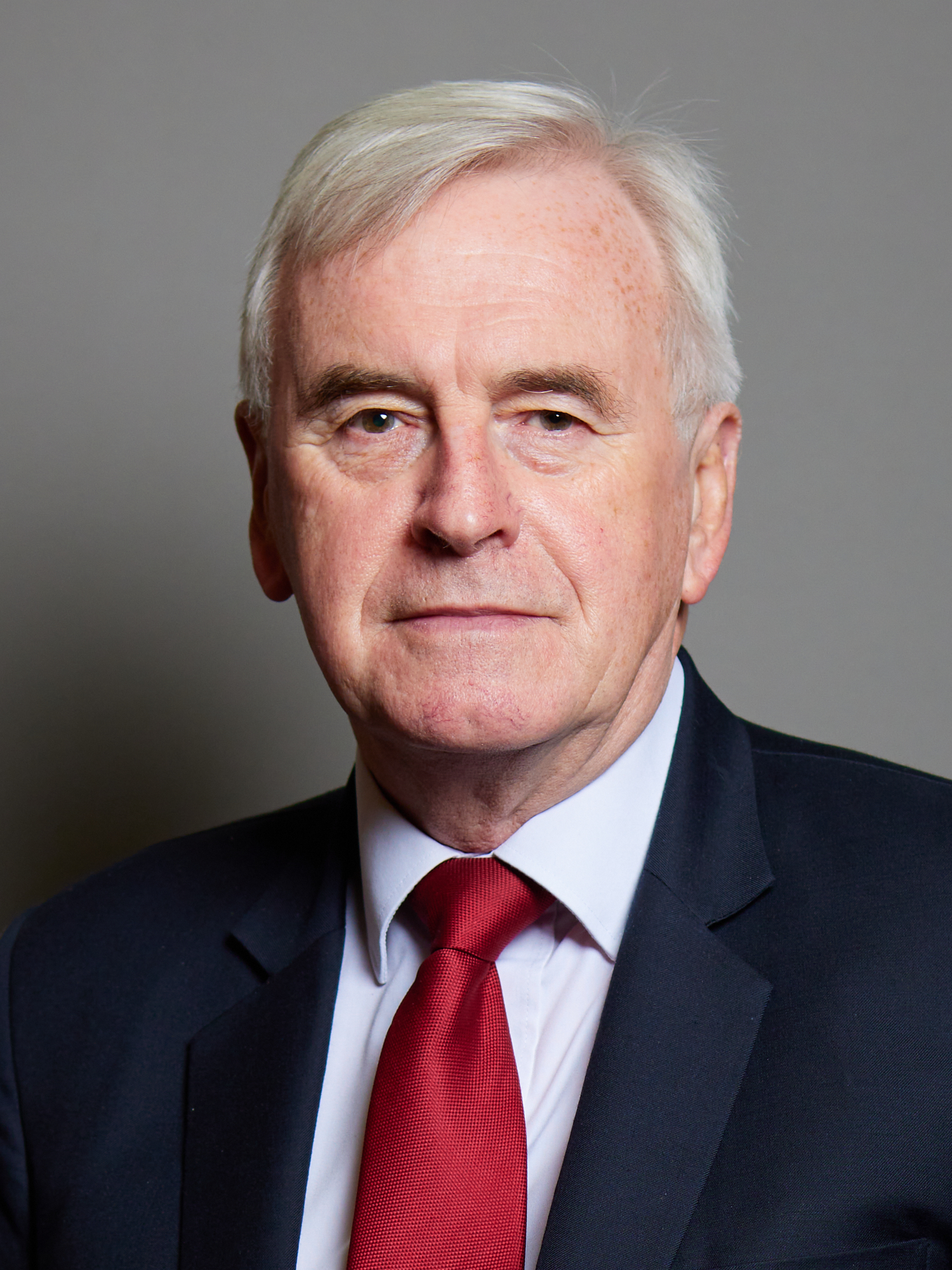
- Official portrait, 2021

Shadow Chancellor of the Exchequer
- In office 13 September 2015 – 5 April 2020
- Leader: Jeremy Corbyn
- Preceded by: Chris Leslie
- Succeeded by: Anneliese Dodds

Deputy Leader of the Greater London Council
- In office 7 May 1984 – 7 May 1985
- Leader: Ken Livingstone
- Preceded by: Illtyd Harrington
- Succeeded by: Michael Ward

Chair of the Finance and General Purposes committee
- In office 11 May 1982 – 21 May 1985
- Leader: Ken Livingstone
- Preceded by: Dr Anthony Hart
- Succeeded by: Alex Mackay

Member of Parliament for Hayes and Harlington
- Incumbent
- Assumed office 1 May 1997
- Preceded by: Terry Dicks
- Majority: 12,031 (31.4%)

Member of the Greater London Council for Hayes and Harlington
- In office 7 May 1981 – 31 March 1986
- Preceded by: Arthur H. S. Hull
- Succeeded by: Office abolished

Personal details
- Born: John Martin McDonnell; 8 September 1951 (age 75) Liverpool, England
- Party: Labour
- Other political affiliations: Socialist Campaign Group; DiEM25
- Spouses: Marilyn Jean Cooper (m. 1971; div. 1987) Cynthia Marie Pinto (m. 1995)
- Children: 3
- Education: Brunel University (BA); Birkbeck, University of London (MSc)
- Website: Official website
- John McDonnell's voice McDonnell addresses the crowd at The World Transformed; Recorded 28 September 2017

John Martin McDonnell (born 8 September 1951) is a British Labour Party politician who served as Shadow Chancellor of the Exchequer from 2015 to 2020. He has been the Member of Parliament (MP) for Hayes and Harlington since 1997.

He formerly had the Labour whip withdrawn and was suspended from the party on 23 July 2024 as a result of voting to scrap the two child benefit cap. McDonnell is on the political left and a member of the Socialist Campaign Group.

He stood for the position of Labour Party leader following Tony Blair's resignation in 2007, but failed to reach the required number of nominations. He was a candidate for the party leadership again in 2010 following Gordon Brown's resignation after Labour's electoral defeat, but withdrew in favour of Diane Abbott, feeling that he would be unable to secure enough nominations.

Alongside Jeremy Corbyn, McDonnell has been seen as a major figure on the left wing of the party. After being elected Labour leader in 2015, Corbyn appointed McDonnell to his Shadow Cabinet as Shadow Chancellor of the Exchequer. As Shadow Chancellor, McDonnell pledged to increase spending on infrastructure and research, describing his vision for the economy as "socialism with an iPad".

== Early life ==
McDonnell was born in Liverpool to a family with an Irish Catholic background. His father, Bob, was a docker who also served as a sergeant in the Sherwood Foresters during World War II, whilst his mother Elsie worked as a cleaner. He moved with his family to his mother's hometown, Great Yarmouth in Norfolk, when he was very young as his father was unable to find work at the docks; his father became a bus driver and was a branch secretary of the Transport and General Workers' Union and his mother worked for British Home Stores. McDonnell attended Great Yarmouth Grammar School. McDonnell received a Local Authority grant to attend St Joseph's College, Ipswich, a Roman Catholic boarding fee-paying independent school for boys (now co-educational). McDonnell is now irreligious, but refers to himself as a "cultural Catholic" and is a regular churchgoer.

McDonnell failed his A-levels at grammar school, partly due to holding down part-time jobs in bars and a bingo hall. Upon leaving education, McDonnell held a series of unskilled jobs. After marrying his first wife, he returned to A-level studies at night school at Burnley Technical College, and at the age of 23, he moved to Hayes in Greater London, attended Brunel University, and earned a bachelor's degree in government and politics. During this period, he helped his wife run a small children's home in Hayes, and was active on behalf of his local community and for National Union of Public Employees. After completing his master's degree in politics and sociology at Birkbeck, University of London, he became a researcher and official with the National Union of Mineworkers from 1977 to 1978, and later the Trades Union Congress from 1978 until 1982. From 1985 to 1987, McDonnell was head of the policy unit at Camden Borough Council, then chief executive of the Association of London Authorities from 1987 to 1995, and the Association of London Government from 1995 until 1997.

== Greater London Council (1981–1986) ==
In 1981, McDonnell was elected to the Greater London Council (GLC) as the member for Hayes and Harlington. He became the GLC's chair of finance and deputy leader to Ken Livingstone, who described him as having an "absolute grasp for detail and every year he produced a balanced budget, no borrowing". He was sacked by Livingstone in 1985 over the strategy to oppose rate-capping—Prime Minister Margaret Thatcher's government had capped council rates (now called council tax), an action which the GLC had claimed, based on figures calculated by McDonnell, would lead to £135 million in cuts. However, Livingstone claimed in his autobiography to have found that the authority could actually still increase spending and cap the rates; Livingstone said that McDonnell had 'exaggerated' spending figures to support his case that the GLC had to ignore the rates cap, and that he confronted McDonnell, saying "If these figures are right we're going to look like the biggest fucking liars since Goebbels." McDonnell described Livingstone's account as "complete fiction".

In an interview with Ronan Bennett for The Guardian newspaper, McDonnell described his role during this time as being "to translate policies into concrete realities on the ground." He further discussed his performance by indicating, "I was a fairly hard-nosed administrator. We set in train policies for which we were attacked from all sides but are now accepted as mainstream: large-scale investment in public services; raising the issue of Ireland and arguing for a dialogue for peace; equal opportunities; police accountability. We set up a women's committee, an ethnic minorities committee."

== After the GLC (1986–1997) ==
Following the abolition of the GLC in 1986, McDonnell was employed as head of the policy unit at Camden London Borough Council. In 1987, he became Chief Executive of the Association of London Authorities (eventually the Association of London Government), where he represented all the London boroughs in their relations with central government and Europe. Having previously unsuccessfully contested Hampstead and Highgate in 1983, McDonnell fought for his home constituency of Hayes and Harlington at the 1992 general election, but lost by 53 votes, after three recounts, to the Conservative incumbent, Terry Dicks. During the campaign, Dicks sued for libel over critical material in McDonnell's campaign leaflets; McDonnell settled and paid Dicks damages of £15,000 plus legal costs of £55,000. McDonnell would later refer to Dicks as a 'stain' on the character of the House of Commons and a stain on the Conservative Party, and a 'malignant creature' during his maiden parliamentary speech.

== Parliamentary backbencher (1997–2015) ==
When Terry Dicks then stood down, McDonnell became the MP for Hayes and Harlington at the 1997 general election, with 62 per cent of the vote and a majority of over 14,000. He made his maiden speech in the House of Commons on 6 June 1997, where he notably launched a scathing attack against his predecessor, against parliamentary tradition. He has been involved in several local community campaigns, including one opposing the expansion of Heathrow Airport and its impact on local communities. He opposed New Labour policies of the Iraq War, foundation hospitals, student top-up fees, trust schools and anti-terror laws. When Ken Livingstone was elected Mayor of London, as an independent in 2000, he appointed McDonnell to his cabinet with responsibility for local government in London.

=== Iraq War ===
McDonnell voted against the 2003 Iraq War, stating in 2007:

I have used every opportunity to oppose the government's alliance with George Bush and the US-led military occupation of Iraq which has resulted in the deaths of over 655,000, caused untold human suffering, put at risk the territorial integrity of Iraq, destabilised the entire region, alienated our own Muslim communities and given a huge boost to international terrorism – just as we warned it would.

In October 2006, McDonnell was one of 12 Labour MPs to back Plaid Cymru and the Scottish National Party's call for a parliamentary inquiry into the war in Iraq.

=== Irish Republican Army ===
In May 2003, he made controversial comments about the Provisional Irish Republican Army (IRA), saying:

It's about time we started honouring those people involved in the armed struggle. It was the bombs and bullets and sacrifice made by the likes of Bobby Sands that brought Britain to the negotiating table. The peace we have now is due to the action of the IRA.

Threatened with expulsion from the Labour Party, he went on to offer a rationale for his comments in an article written for The Guardian in June 2003 ("Expulsion would be an odd reward for telling hard truths"), stating:

Let me be clear, I abhor the killing of innocent human beings. My argument was that republicans had the right to honour those who had brought about this process of negotiation which had led to peace. Having achieved this central objective now it was time to move on. The future for achieving the nationalists' goals is through the political process and in particular through the Northern Ireland Assembly elections ... Irish republicans have to face the fact that the use of violence has resulted in unforgivable atrocities. No cause is worth the loss of a child's life. No amount of political theory will justify what has been perpetrated on the victims of the bombing campaigns.

According to a report in The Times published in November 2015, McDonnell had made similar comments at a Labour Committee on Ireland meeting in 1985, before the start of the Northern Ireland peace process. The Deptford Mercury asserted at the time that McDonnell had suggested there was a role for "the ballot, the bullet and the bomb" in achieving a United Ireland, and joked about "kneecapping" the "gutless wimp" Labour councillors who had declined to join the meeting.

In September 2015, McDonnell apologised on the BBC television programme Question Time for any offence caused by his remarks on the IRA. He said that his remarks in 2003 had been an attempt to persuade republicans to support the peace process and to afford the IRA the opportunity to disarm without humiliation stating: "There was a real risk of the Republican movement splitting and some of them continuing the armed process."

In his study at Hayes, McDonnell has a plaque presented to him by Gerry Kelly dedicated to the "H-Block Martyrs 1981", referring to those who died during the 1981 Irish hunger strike. A spokesman for McDonnell said the plaque "merely commemorates the peaceful protest in prison, not the prior actions of those involved".

=== Groups and campaigns in Parliament ===
McDonnell is a leading member of several all-party groups within Parliament, including groups representing individual trade unions, such as the Public and Commercial Services Union (PCS), the National Union of Rail, Maritime and Transport Workers (RMT), the Fire Brigades Union (FBU), the National Union of Journalists (NUJ) and justice unions such as NAPO. He is also a leading member of groups on a wide range of issues such as Britain's Irish community, the Punjabi community, endometriosis, and Kenya. McDonnell is a member of the Labour Land Campaign, which advocates introducing a land value tax.

McDonnell chairs the Labour Representation Committee (LRC), a left-wing group of Labour activists, local parties, trade unions and MPs that campaigns for the adoption of a raft of socialist policies by the Labour Government. The group was founded on Saturday, 3 July 2004, and currently has more than 800 members and 90 affiliates. He also chairs the Public Services Not Private Profit, an anti-privatisation campaign that brings together sixteen trade unions and several campaigning organisations, such as the World Development Movement, Defend Council Housing and the National Pensioners Convention. An early day motion in support of the campaign attracted more than ninety MPs. The campaign held a mass rally and lobby of Parliament on 27 June 2006, which was attended by more than 2,000 trade unionists.

=== Economic policy ===
In 2006, McDonnell said that "Marx, Lenin and Trotsky" were his "most significant" intellectual influences. Footage emerged of McDonnell in 2013 talking about the 2008 financial crisis and stating, "I've been waiting for this for a generation! We've got to demand systemic change. Look, I'm straight, I'm honest with people: I'm a Marxist." He was accused of celebrating the 2008 financial crisis; McDonnell denied the allegation and claimed he was joking. During an interview with Andrew Marr when the footage was played and McDonnell was asked, "Are you a Marxist?", he replied: "I believe there's a lot to learn from reading Kapital, yes of course there is, and that's been recommended not just by me but many others, mainstream economists as well." In 2018, McDonnell attended the Marx 200 conference, where he said, "Marxism is about the freedom of spirit, the development of life chances, the enhancement of democracy." In 2019, McDonnell stated during an interview that Marx's Kapital is "one of the important analyses of the modern capitalist system".

==== Public services ====
McDonnell has consistently opposed the privatisation of public services and chaired the Public Services not Private Profit Campaign launched in 2006 and supported by sixteen trade unions linking up with students, pensioners, health campaigners and the World Development Movement.

McDonnell is "not supportive of PFI schemes", declaring that he has "opposed every PFI scheme that was proposed". In 2006, during the parliamentary debate on the Budget Resolutions, McDonnell warned against public-private finance initiatives (PFIs), calling for an inquiry:

There are numerous examples. I refer hon. Members to the work of Alison Pollock and to the publications by Unison in recent months, which contain example after example in the public services, health and education where PFI has been used to exploit the public purse, has failed to deliver and has delivered large bonuses and profits to individual company directors. That is why I regret that the Chancellor is going along that line. I would welcome a Government inquiry into PFI, which would probably echo the work done by the Public Accounts Committee on individual PFI schemes, which has demonstrated their lack of deliverability and cost effectiveness.

==== Tax transparency ====
Throughout his time in Parliament, McDonnell has championed the cause of tax justice, hosting the launch of the Tax Justice Network in 2003.

In 2002, McDonnell worked with William Campbell-Taylor and Maurice Glasman, who challenged a bill concerned with the City of London Corporation in relation to alleged tax avoidance:

Apart from a couple of brave, independent-minded Labour MPs, notably John McDonnell, nobody supported Glasman and Campbell-Taylor to challenge the bill. Such is the fear that the corporation inspires in parliament.

==== Bank regulations ====
During the 2011 Budget Resolutions, McDonnell highlighted his long-term consistent work calling for better regulation of the banking and finance sector:

We seem to forget that the cause of that crisis was the cause of this crisis—speculation by the banks and other speculators and, yes, a Government who failed to regulate. I have to say, however, that when a number of Members called for bank regulation in this House, there was an element of quietude on all sides. I remember fighting for four years, in almost a solitary capacity, to secure the passage of the City of London (Ward Elections) Bill at a time when we were pressing for regulation.

==== Anti-austerity ====
In February 2013, McDonnell was among those who supported the People's Assembly Against Austerity in a letter published by The Guardian.

=== Heathrow Airport expansion ===
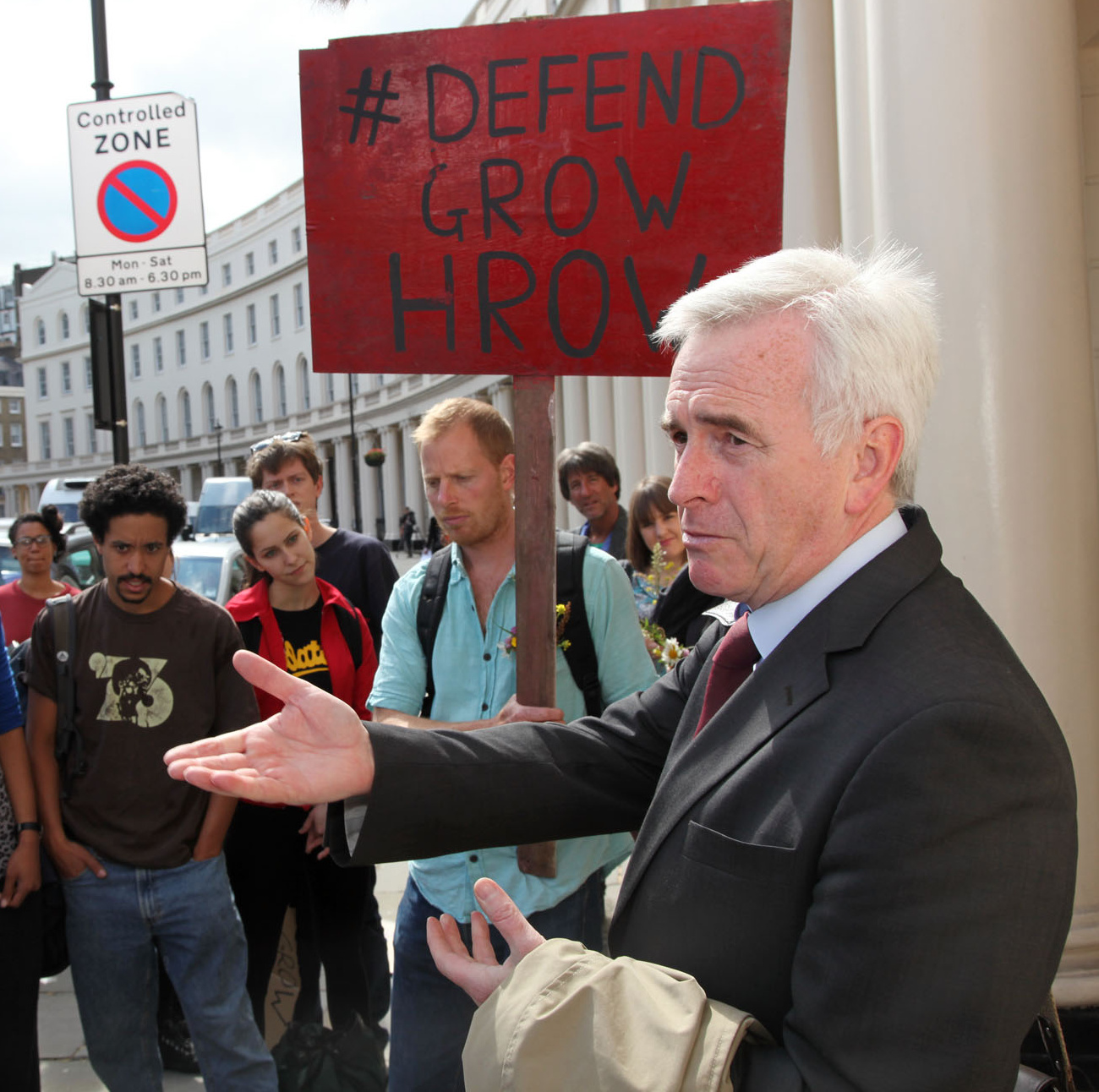
McDonnell with opponents of the Heathrow Airport expansion outside Central London County Court, 2012

McDonnell has been a vocal opponent of plans to expand Heathrow Airport with a third runway—the proposed site lies within his constituency. During a debate on the expansion of the airport on 15 January 2009, he was suspended for five days by Deputy Speaker Alan Haselhurst after disrupting Commons proceedings. McDonnell picked up the ceremonial mace and placed it down on an empty bench in the Commons while shouting that the lack of a vote on the third runway was "a disgrace to the democracy of this country."

=== Armed police and MI5 ===
In 2015, McDonnell's name appeared on a letter calling for armed police and MI5 to be disbanded. He claimed that he had not signed the letter, which was produced by the Socialist Campaign for a Labour Victory (SCLV), but he was photographed holding a copy of the letter, although he later said that he did not know that the demand was on the letter.

=== 2007 Labour leadership campaign ===
On 14 July 2006, McDonnell announced his intention to stand for leadership of the Labour Party when Tony Blair announced the date of his resignation. He called for "a challenge to the present political consensus", and, "a real Labour government based upon the policies that our supporters expect from us". McDonnell said he would like to see a return to the Labour Party's more traditional areas.

Initially, McDonnell and Michael Meacher were the two candidates representing the left wing of the party. McDonnell's campaign concentrated on grassroots efforts, which earned him an endorsement from the Trades Union Congress. In a YouGov opinion poll of more than 1,100 Labour Party members asking their preferred choice in the leadership contest, McDonnell received 9% support, and was ranked second to Chancellor Gordon Brown, who led with 80% of the vote. Declared supporters included Diane Abbott, Tony Benn, and Ann Cryer. In total, eleven Labour MPs declared their support on McDonnell's campaign website.

Labour Party rules require candidates to be nominated by 12.5% of Labour MPs (45 out of a total of 355 in 2007). Gordon Brown received 313 (88.2%) nominations, while McDonnell failed to collect the 45 nominations required to proceed to the Electoral College. As the only nominated candidate, Gordon Brown was declared leader by the NEC.

=== 2010 Labour leadership campaign ===
On 18 May 2010, news broke that McDonnell wanted to stand in the Labour Party leadership election, to be held following the resignation of Gordon Brown, and would announce it the following day at the Public and Commercial Services Union conference in Brighton. McDonnell noted that it would be "difficult" to get the 33 nominations needed from the Parliamentary Labour Party required to stand in the election.

During a hustings for the GMB Union on 7 June, McDonnell was asked what single act he would do to improve the world if he could travel back to the 1980s. His off-the-cuff reply was that "I was on the GLC that Mrs. Thatcher abolished, I worked for the NUM and we had the NUM strike, I think I would assassinate Thatcher." Conservative MP Conor Burns told the BBC that "[it was] very distasteful" and "a very silly remark". McDonnell told the BBC: "I'm sorry if I have caused offence to anyone. It was a joke and in that audience it was taken as a joke ... it was taken out of context, I can see if people are upset about that and if I have caused offence to anyone of course I apologise."

By 9 June 2010, the deadline for nominations, he had secured only 16 nominations and withdrew from the contest.

== Shadow Chancellor of the Exchequer (2015–2020) ==
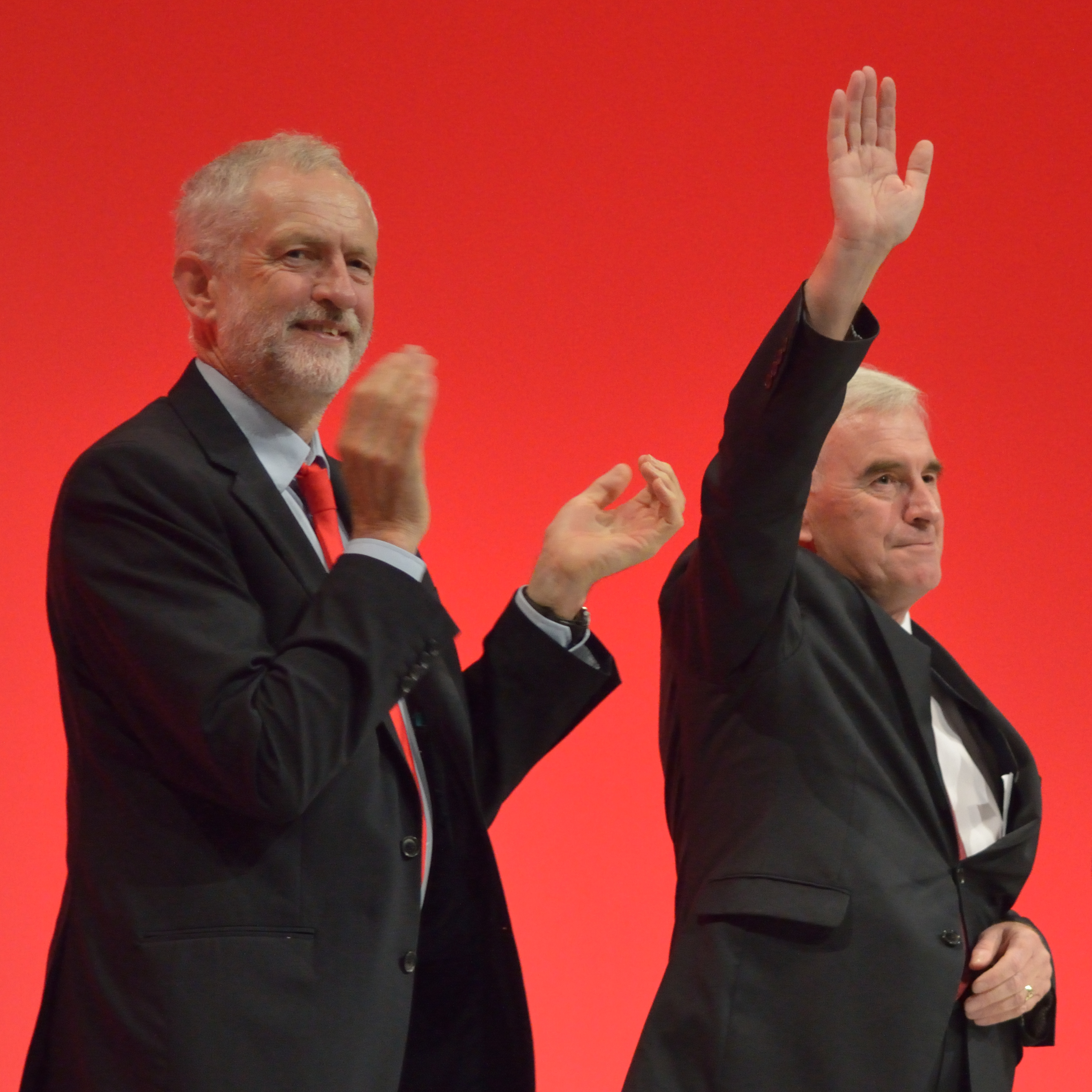
McDonnell after giving his 2016 Labour Party Conference speech, with Labour leader Jeremy Corbyn

McDonnell was one of the thirty-six Labour MPs to nominate Jeremy Corbyn (who was elected as Labour leader with 59.5% of the vote) as a candidate in the Labour leadership election of 2015. McDonnell managed Corbyn's leadership campaign, and he was appointed Shadow Chancellor in September 2015.

In an article in The Guardian in the previous month, he set out the economic principles that a Corbyn government would follow:

Let me make it absolutely clear that Labour under Jeremy Corbyn is committed to eliminating the deficit and creating an economy in which we live within our means. ... We accept that cuts in public spending will help eliminate the deficit, but our cuts won't be to the middle-and low-income earners and certainly not to the poor ... alongside deficit elimination, the Corbyn campaign is advocating a fundamental reform of our economic system. This will include the introduction of an effective regulatory regime for our banks and financial sector; a full-blown Glass-Steagall system to separate day-to-day and investment banking; legislation to replace short-term shareholder value with long-term sustainable economic and social responsibilities as the prime objective of companies; radical reform of the failed auditing regime; the extension of a wider range of forms of company and enterprise ownership and control including public, co-operative and stakeholder ownership; and the introduction of a financial transactions tax to fund the rebalancing of our economy towards production and manufacturing.

McDonnell's first speech as Shadow Chancellor was at the 2015 Labour Party conference in Brighton. In the speech, he set out Labour's thinking and priorities in key areas, as well as encouraging Labour MPs who had refused to serve under Corbyn to return.

He surprised many by calling upon Labour MPs to back Conservative Chancellor George Osborne's Fiscal Charter, arguing that supporting the proposed deficit reduction framework showed Labour's commitment to "living within their means." However, he reversed that call in October, citing his trip to visit former steelworkers at a recently closed plant in Redcar as the reason for not wanting to be associated with supporting government cuts. McDonnell repeated the word "embarrassing" five times in his Commons response to the U-turn, adding that "a bit of humility amongst politicians never goes amiss".

In a November speech ahead of Osborne's Spending Review, McDonnell pledged that a Labour government would spend 3.5% of GDP on infrastructure and fund research through an Innovation Policy Council, describing his vision for the economy as "socialism with an iPad".

McDonnell has explored ideas surrounding "alternative models of ownership", publishing a report on the subject in June 2017 and hosting a discussion conference in London in February 2018. The report sets out the "practicality and necessity of a shift to a variety of alternative forms of ownership and control of productive enterprises, including co-operatives, municipal and locally-led ownership forms, and ... new democratic forms of national ownership".

During his response to the 2015 Autumn Statement in which he accused George Osborne of "sheer economic illiteracy", McDonnell highlighted that the government was "selling off at least £5 billion worth of our own assets" to foreign investors, emphasising China. To make this point he quoted from a copy of Chairman Mao Zedong's Little Red Book and then threw it across the despatch box towards the Conservative front bench. A clearly amused Osborne responded by quipping that it was McDonnell's own signed copy.

On 29 September 2016, he was appointed to the Privy Council and may therefore use the title The Right Honourable.

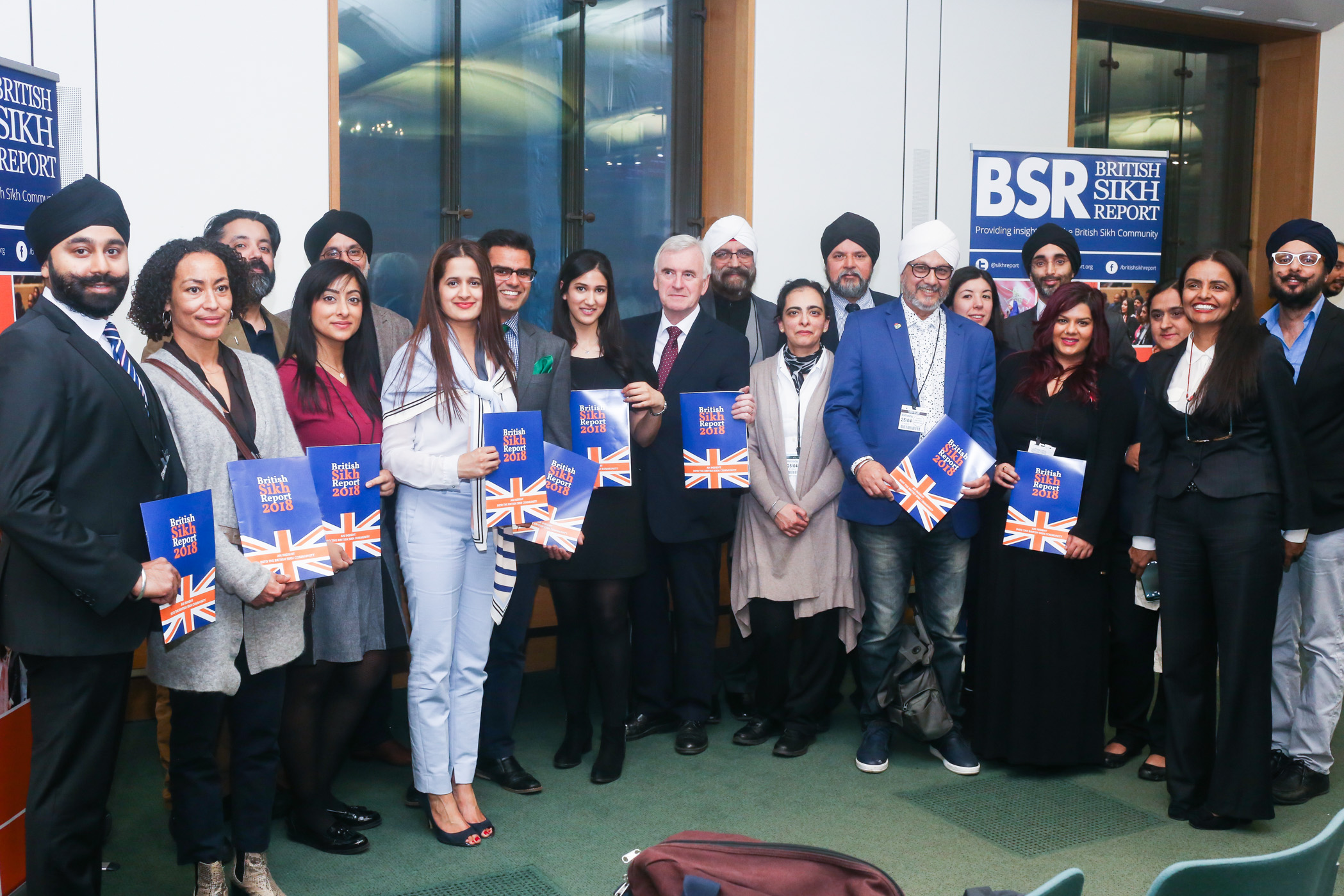
McDonnell with members of the British Sikh community in April 2018

In the aftermath of the Grenfell Tower fire, McDonnell said those who died in it were "murdered" by political decisions, arguing "The decision to close fire stations and to cut 10,000 fire fighters and then to freeze their pay for over a decade contributed to those deaths inevitably". The use of the word "murder" was questioned by some of his colleagues as well as the Conservative Party, with Jim Fitzpatrick, leader of the All-Party Parliamentary Group on Fire Safety suggesting it was "premature" to draw conclusions about what caused the deaths.

McDonnell said that Grenfell "symbolised for many everything that's gone wrong in this country since austerity was imposed upon us" and used it to highlight pay cuts across the public sector, arguing that Conservatives praise the emergency services "every time there's a tragedy" while cutting jobs and wages.

McDonnell sparked controversy when he joked that Conservative politician Esther McVey should be lynched and described her as a "stain on humanity." He said that he was quoting a constituent speaking at a public meeting convened to oppose McVey's policies on benefits and did not endorse the sentiment. The Leader of the House of Commons, Andrea Leadsom, called the remark "truly evil."

In 2017, McDonnell said: "I will be the first socialist Labour Chancellor". McDonnell in his Who’s Who entry posted one of his hobbies as "fermenting [sic] the overthrow of capitalism". In 2018, McDonnell said that he "wants to "overthrow capitalism" and replace it with a "socialist society"". He also said Venezuela's economic problems were because it was no longer a socialist country.

In September 2018, McDonnell said he would only back a second referendum on the European Union if the option to remain is not present. He also agreed with shadow international trade secretary Barry Gardiner, when he suggested a second referendum could lead to social unrest.

In February 2019, McDonnell sparked controversy when he referred to the former Prime Minister Winston Churchill as a "villain." Writing on Twitter, Boris Johnson said: "JM should be utterly ashamed of his remarks and withdraw them forthwith."

During a comprehensive interview conducted by former Labour Party member Alastair Campbell for British GQ in October 2019, McDonnell stated his disapproval of the former's expulsion from the party and indicated he would support his return. He also expressed his own view that the next party leader should be female, and that the party should employ positive discrimination to aid that prospect if Jeremy Corbyn were to lose the next general election. When asked to name any current Tory politician whom he respected, he declined, subsequently stating that he "can't forgive any of them". Campbell followed up by asking the same question about any historic Tories, to which McDonnell replied "No".

Upon the election of Keir Starmer as Leader of the Labour Party, McDonnell stood down as Shadow Chancellor and was succeeded by Anneliese Dodds.

== Return to the backbenches (2020–present) ==
In February 2020, McDonnell met with Julian Assange at HM Prison Belmarsh.

He ran a campaign to pass a motion supporting proportional representation at the 2022 Labour Party conference after it failed in 2021 due to a lack of trade union support.

On 24 February 2022, following the 2022 Russian invasion of Ukraine, McDonnell was one of 11 Labour MPs threatened with losing the party whip after they signed a statement by the Stop the War Coalition which questioned the legitimacy of NATO and accused the military alliance of "eastward expansion". All 11 MPs subsequently removed their signatures. McDonnell subsequently joined calls led by the Ukraine Solidarity Campaign for increased arms supplies to Ukraine and criticised those on the left who opposed it.

In 2023, he criticised Keir Starmer for allowing members from the party's right wing to become "drunk with power". This came after members of the Labour left had been barred from running as Labour candidates at the next general election and some left wing sitting MPs such as Ian Byrne were forced to face re-selection by their local constituency parties. It also followed the October 2021 suspension of Jeremy Corbyn from the Labour whip.

In July 2024, McDonnell campaigned on and voted for a SNP motion to scrap the two-child benefit cap which he opposed in 2015 when it was introduced under the Conservatives, defying the Labour whip. He was one of seven Labour MPs to do so and as a result had the whip suspended for six months with the other MPs. At the end of the six month period, McDonnell and two of the other seven MPs, Apsana Begum and Zarah Sultana, remained suspended, Sultana resigned from the Labour Party, 3 July 2025. He and Begum eventually had the whip restored in September 2025. Following Andy Burnham's election as MP for Makerfield in June 2026, he stated that "it is inevitable" that the newly elected MP will be installed as Prime Minister.

== Political views ==
=== Economic policy ===
McDonnell belongs to the left wing of the British Labour Party, and is a member of the Socialist Campaign Group, a left-wing parliamentary caucus. He describes himself as a socialist and has stated his intention to be "the first socialist Labour Chancellor".

As shadow chancellor of the exchequer from 2015 to 2020, McDonnell developed Labour's economic strategy, which he described as "socialism with an iPad". In a 2015 article for The Guardian, McDonnell outlined the economic principles of a potential Corbyn government, including commitments to deficit elimination while protecting middle and low-income earners from cuts. His proposals included introducing "an effective regulatory regime for our banks and financial sector; a full-blown Glass-Steagall system to separate day-to-day and investment banking" and "the introduction of a financial transactions tax to fund the rebalancing of our economy towards production and manufacturing".

McDonnell pledged that a Labour government would spend 3.5% of GDP on infrastructure and established plans for an Innovation Policy Council. He has been a long-term advocate for financial transaction taxes, previously campaigning for what he termed a "Robin Hood tax" on stock market trading.

==== Public ownership and nationalisation ====
McDonnell has been a prominent advocate for public ownership of key industries and utilities. He published a report titled "Alternative Models of Ownership" in June 2017, which set out "the practicality and necessity of a shift to a variety of alternative forms of ownership and control of productive enterprises, including co-operatives, municipal and locally-led ownership forms, and new democratic forms of national ownership".

In 2018, McDonnell claimed that nationalising services such as railways would cost taxpayers "absolutely nothing", describing the policy as "cost neutral" because "you would be bringing into public ownership an asset" that would generate income for taxpayers rather than shareholders. He outlined detailed plans for water industry nationalisation, proposing that services be run by local councils, workers, and customers.

=== Foreign policy ===
McDonnell opposed the deployment of UK forces to Afghanistan, opposed the war in Afghanistan itself and opposed the 2003 invasion of Iraq and subsequent Iraq War.

==== Israel and Palestine ====
McDonnell has been a vocal critic of Israeli government policies and supporter of Palestinian rights. In February 2022, during a House of Commons debate, he described Israel as an "apartheid state" based on reports from Amnesty International and other human rights organisations. In December 2024, he called for the expulsion of the Israeli ambassador to the UK and advocated for "total isolation of Israel" to bring about "some form of negotiated settlement".

McDonnell has defended activists from Palestine Action, criticising the use of counter-terrorism powers against what he described as mostly young people protesting arms sales to Israel. He has consistently opposed British arms sales to Israel, particularly components for F-35 fighter jets.

=== European Union and Brexit ===
McDonnell's position on European Union membership has evolved over time. In a 2024 interview, he described himself as "relatively agnostic" on EU membership, noting he had voted against joining the European Economic Community in the original referendum but had since treated the issue "with almost a matter of relative indifference".

Following the 2016 Brexit referendum, McDonnell pledged that Labour would "never vote to send home" EU citizens living in Britain, stating "we're not that kind of people". In June 2017, he confirmed that a Labour government would take the UK out of the EU's single market, arguing that remaining in it would not "respect the referendum result", while seeking "tariff-free access" to the economic bloc for a "jobs first" Brexit.

In September 2018, McDonnell stated he would only support a second EU referendum if the option to remain was not included, expressing concerns that such a referendum could lead to social unrest.

=== Housing and social policy ===
McDonnell has been a prominent advocate for rent controls and expanded tenants' rights. He has called for rent freezes and supported proposals that would give private sector tenants the right to purchase their homes at below-market prices. During the COVID-19 pandemic, he advocated for the cancellation of rent arrears and extending eviction bans by at least a year, arguing that "housing should be a right for all, not an investment opportunity for a few".

McDonnell has consistently advocated for large-scale council house building programmes and has criticised the Right to Buy policy, describing the council house sell-off as "a major factor in creating the housing crisis".

=== Environmental policy ===
McDonnell has been a leading advocate for what he terms a "Green Industrial Revolution". In a 2019 essay for Jacobin, he argued that environmental and social justice are inextricably linked, stating that "our socialism is about liberation from a system that pits better lives for humankind against the well-being of our natural surroundings".

As Shadow Chancellor, McDonnell supported Labour's commitment to achieving net-zero carbon emissions by 2030 and public ownership of the energy sector. He has proposed controversial measures including delisting companies with poor environmental credentials from the London Stock Exchange and creating a Sustainable Investment Board to oversee private investment decisions.

=== Basic income ===
McDonnell has expressed support for universal basic income policies. In 2014, he hosted a session on citizen's income and commissioned economist Guy Standing to produce a report titled "Piloting Basic Income as Common Dividends" for Labour Party consideration. The report proposed giving every adult citizen £100 per week unconditionally, though McDonnell clarified that Labour was not committed to implementing the policy.

=== Personal political philosophy ===
When asked if he was a Marxist in an LBC interview with Iain Dale, McDonnell replied:

"I describe myself as a socialist. I think I'm in the tradition of the Attlee government".

However, McDonnell has also made more radical statements about his political objectives. In a 2018 interview, he stated that he "wants to overthrow capitalism and replace it with a socialist society". In 2006, he stated that "Marx, Lenin and Trotsky" were his "most significant" intellectual influences.

== Personal life ==
McDonnell has two daughters from his first marriage, which ended in 1985, and a son from his second marriage to Cynthia Pinto in 1995.

In 2013, McDonnell suffered a heart attack and was forced to take time off work.

While raised as a Roman Catholic and attending a minor seminary, McDonnell now identifies as an atheist. Despite this McDonnell still respects the Church and acknowledges that he owes a "debt" to it for shaping his politics, later saying "The values of Catholicism are the inherent values of the Labour Party and the inherent values of socialism".

=== Interview under police caution ===
On 19 January 2025, McDonnell, alongside Jeremy Corbyn, agreed to be interviewed under caution by police following a pro-Palestinian rally in central London. The Metropolitan Police said they witnessed a "deliberate effort, including by protest organisers" to breach conditions that had been imposed on the event. However, it is unclear as to the specific reasons as to why McDonnell was invited to an interview.

== See also ==
- Economics for the Many
- Labour Representation Committee
- Socialist Campaign Group

Parliament of the United Kingdom
Preceded by Terry Dicks	Member of Parliament for Hayes and Harlington; 1997–present	Incumbent
Political offices
Preceded by Chris Leslie	Shadow Chancellor of the Exchequer; 2015–2020	Succeeded by Anneliese Dodds
