= Larissa Kennedy =

Former president of the National Union of Students

61st President of the National Union of Students
- In office 1 July 2020 – 1 July 2022
- Preceded by: Zamzam Ibrahim
- Succeeded by: Shaima Dallali

Personal details
- Education: University of Warwick
- Occupation: NUS President, Activist

Larissa Kennedy is a student politician who was President of the UK National Union of Students 2020–2022, succeeding Zamzam Ibrahim. She was the first president elected via online ballot, defeating six other candidates. She served a two-year term to oversee the NUS's three-year plan to financially overhaul its organisation following a £3 million shortfall in 2018. She is also a trustee of Students Organising for Sustainability (SOS-UK), an educational charity formed in response to the climate emergency and ecological crisis.

== Biography ==
Kennedy was born in London and grew up in Croydon, south London. She is a "granddaughter of the Windrush generation", with family roots in Jamaica, Barbados and St Vincent. She studied at Croydon High School, an independent girls' school.

She has been involved in activism and student politics since she was 16, when she served on the Girlguiding UK’s national Advocate panel. While studying politics, international studies, and Hispanic studies at University of Warwick, Kennedy founded the "Warwick Decolonise Project". She was formerly elected Education Officer and Deputy President at Warwick Students’ Union. Between 2018 and 2020 she served on NUS’ National Executive Council, and she is a member of the NUS Black student's campaign.

Kennedy previously served as Advocacy and Campaigns Officer at Plan International during a sabbatical year from her undergraduate studies, and was a 2017–2019 trustee to the British Youth Council. She served as UK Youth Delegate to the Council of Europe Congress in 2018.

Kennedy is a member of the UK committee of the global Youth for Change organisation, which campaigns to end gender-based violence and FGM. She is an alumna of the TuWezeshe Akina Dada Fellowship, a young women's leadership programme run by the charity FORWARD.

== NUS Presidency ==
Kennedy entered office during the 2020 pandemic. She campaigned for student safety and greater testing in student communities, as well as greater investment in student mental health services and making online learning accessible. She criticised the UK Government's decision to base A-Level exam results on the previous results of colleges and schools – which resulted in students from disadvantaged backgrounds "more likely to be downgraded", commenting that this policy "reproduces inequality". Furthermore, she voiced concern that the government was allowing the pandemic to affect Black communities disproportionately.

== Controversy ==
It was reported by The Jewish Chronicle in March 2022 that Kennedy had suggested that Jewish students could leave a venue during Lowkey's participation during a planned event at the NUS conference in Liverpool as mitigation for his inclusion. Lowkey subsequently did not appear at the event.
