= Arthur Skeffington =

British politician (1909–1971)

- Portrait by Walter Bird, 1965

Member of Parliament for Hayes and Harlington
- In office 1 April 1953 – 18 February 1971
- Preceded by: Walter Ayles
- Succeeded by: Neville Sandelson

Member of Parliament for Lewisham West
- In office 5 July 1945 – 3 February 1950
- Preceded by: Henry Brooke
- Succeeded by: Henry Price

Personal details
- Born: 4 September 1909
- Died: 18 February 1971 (aged 61) London, England
- Party: Labour
- Children: 2
- Education: Streatham Grammar School; University of London (BSc)

Arthur Massey Skeffington (4 September 1909 – 18 February 1971) was a British Labour Party politician who served as a Member of Parliament (MP) for 23 years from 1945 until his death in 1971.

== Early life ==
Educated at Streatham Grammar School and the University of London, Skeffington graduated with a BSc in Economics. He lectured in economics, was a member of the Fabian Society and was elected to the National Executive of the Labour Party.

At the 1935 general election he unsuccessfully contested the parliamentary seat of Streatham. He also failed to be elected when a by-election was held at Lewisham West in 1938.

During the Second World War he worked for the Board of Trade on concentration of industry and for the Ministry of Supply on the production of medical supplies.

== Parliamentary career ==
Skeffington was elected at the 1945 general election as MP for Lewisham West, but lost his seat at the 1950 general election.

In 1950 he was elected to the London County Council to represent Peckham, holding the seat until 1958. he was called to the bar at the Middle Temple in 1951.

Skeffington successfully contested the Hayes and Harlington by-election in 1953, which he won, thereby being returned to Parliament. He served as MP for that constituency in the House of Commons until his death.

From 1967 to 1970, he was Parliamentary Private Secretary to the Minister for Housing and Local Government. Skeffington was also Chairman of Labour's National Executive Committee from 1969 to 1970.

== Personal life and death ==
Skeffington was married and had two children. A keen cricketer, he played cricket for Surrey 2nd XI.

Skeffington died at Royal Marsden Hospital in London on 18 February 1971, at the age of 61.

== Sources ==
- Leigh Rayment's Historical List of MPs

Parliament of the United Kingdom
Preceded by Henry Brooke	Member of Parliament for Lewisham West; 1945–1950	Succeeded by Henry Price
Preceded by Walter Ayles	Member of Parliament for Hayes and Harlington; 1953–1971	Succeeded by Neville Sandelson
Party political offices
Preceded by Joseph Reeves	Socialist societies representative on the Labour Party National Executive Committee; 1953–1958	Succeeded by Tom Agar
Preceded by Tom Agar	Socialist societies representative on the Labour Party National Executive Committee; 1959–1971	Succeeded by John Cartwright
Preceded by Margaret Cole	Chair of the Fabian Society; 1956–1957	Succeeded by Roy Jenkins
Preceded by Eirene White	Chair of the Labour Party; 1969–1970	Succeeded by Ian Mikardo
