= Verdant (think tank) =

British think tank

- Formation: 25 March 2026; 7 months ago
- Founders: Deborah Doane; James Meadway
- Founded at: City of London
- Type: Think tank
- Purpose: Economic policy
- Co-Director: Deborah Doane
- Co-Director: James Meadway
- Board of directors: Caroline Lucas; Martin Edobor; Ruchi Tripathi; Nick Flynn
- Website: verdantthinking.org

Verdant is an independent British left-wing economic think tank linked to the Green Party of England and Wales, launched on 25 March 2026 by co-chairs Deborah Doane, civil society expert, and James Meadway, economist and former Labour Party adviser. While associated with the Green Party, it has also stated a willingness to collaborate with individuals in Labour.

== History ==
In 2025, following the 2025 Green Party of England and Wales leadership election won by Zack Polanski, James Meadway, an economist and former Labour Party adviser to shadow chancellor John McDonnell under Jeremy Corbyn, as well as civil society expert and Rights CoLab partner Deborah Doane, began discussing how a left-wing economic programme may be effectively advanced and communicated to the public. Bloomberg has argued that Verdant is a response to increased scrutiny of the Green Party after its rise in popularity following Polanski's election. Plans to create the think tank were announced in December 2025; it was stated that Verdant was to be independent from the Green Party, and would aim to push progressive policy ideas suited to adoption by any politicians who were left-of-centre, beginning with economics and broadening in scope over time. Caroline Lucas, former leader and first MP of the Green Party, was announced as a board member.

On 25 March 2026, Verdant was launched by Meadway and Doane near the Barbican Centre in London. Verdant plans to focus on the development of energy, housing and food strategy, intending to allow the Green Party to better stand up to scrutiny. It also plans to work with individuals in the Labour Party. Meadway has stated that "we can’t do Corbynism anymore," noting that during Jeremy Corbyn's time as Labour leader the UK had low interest rates which is no longer the case. The same day, Verdant released its first report, arguing for a "DOGE of the left," which it said would save taxpayer £30 billion per year by removing waste, fraud and tax avoidance; Meadway argued that "the political right have monopolised the discussion about savings in government spending," and accused the original DOGE of being ideologically motivated. The report also argued that the UK should appoint a "chief savings officer" in a similar economic strategy to New York City mayor Zohran Mamdani.
