= Emma Runswick =

English medical doctor and trade unionist

Deputy chair of the British Medical Association council
- Incumbent
- Assumed office 2022

Personal details
- Education: University of Manchester
- Medical career
- Field: Mental health

Emma Runswick is an English medical doctor and trade unionist specialising in mental health. She has served as the deputy chair of the British Medical Association council since 2022.

== Life ==
Runswick was born to Kathy and Alan Runswick. Her parents met through their trade union activity in the Inland Revenue Staff Federation. Both were workplace representatives of the Union in Liverpool. Kathy was elected (as Kathy Liddell) for several years to the National Executive Committee (NEC) of the IRSF, then the NEC of the Public Services, Tax and Commerce Union, and then to the NEC of the Public and Commercial Services Union as the Civil Service Unions merged. She was elected as Deputy President of the PCS and was Chair of the Union's Finance Committee. Her mother is also a former chair of the Wallasey Constituency Labour Party. Kathy left the Labour Party in 2023.

Runswick's father Alan was a local activist and Branch Officer of the IRSF, PTC and then the Public and Commercial Services Union for over 40 years. He served on the Group Executive Committee of the Revenue and Customs Group of PCS for several years until his retirement. Alan was one of the founders of the socialist group in the IRSF and was the National Secretary of the socialist group in PCS for many years including when the left first won a majority on the PCS National Executive Committee.

Emma Runswick went to many trade union and labour movement activities with her parents, including the demonstration against the Iraq war in London on 15th February 2003. She grew up on a council estate in Wirral, England.

Runswick attended the University of Manchester to study medicine and was a student representative during her studies.

Runswick is learning British Sign Language.

Runswick is a resident doctor who works in a community mental health team in Greater Manchester. She worked during the COVID-19 pandemic.

== Activity in the British Medical Association ==
Whilst at University Runswick joined the British Medical association, the trade union and professional association for UK doctors and medical students. She became active in the student section of the BMA, served on the BMA Medical Students’ Committee, and was Chair of the BMA Medical Students’ Conference.

In 2018, she was elected to the UK council of the British Medical Association. In 2022, she was elected to a three-year term as the deputy chair. She is the first out LGBT person, fifth woman, and second junior doctor elected to a chief officer role.

Between 2022 and 2024, Runswick was a prominent figure in the campaign for resident doctor pay restoration. Runswick was one of the early proponents of the pay campaign and of strike action. She appeared on national TV, on radio and in printed media as a spokesperson for the BMA.

Runswick's BMA post offers a salary for the 2 days a week she spends on BMA work. Runswick has instead arranged to be paid the same salary that she would receive if she was working full time as a resident doctor. Her NHS employer is reimbursed by the BMA for the two days that she works for the Union. In 2023, the additional money that Runswick would have received, £22,000 was instead transferred to the BMA strike fund.
