= 1964 United Kingdom local elections =

The 1964 United Kingdom local elections took place in April and May 1964.

== London boroughs ==
The inaugural elections in London boroughs:

Council	Details	Party	Majority
Barking	Details	Labour majority	45 of 49 seats
Barnet	Details	Conservative majority	37 of 56 seats
Bexley	Details	Labour majority	39 of 56 seats
Brent	Details	Labour majority	34 of 60 seats
Bromley	Details	Conservative majority	38 of 60 seats
Camden	Details	Labour majority	34 of 60 seats
Croydon	Details	No overall control	Conservatives and Labour each won 21 of 60 seats
Ealing	Details	Labour majority	34 of 60 seats
Enfield	Details	Labour majority	31 of 60 seats
Greenwich	Details	Labour majority	49 of 60 seats
Hackney	Details	Labour majority	60 of 60 seats
Hammersmith	Details	Labour majority	53 of 60 seats
Haringey	Details	Labour majority	41 of 60 seats
Harrow	Details	Conservative majority	36 of 56 seats
Havering	Details	No overall control	Labour won 27 and Conservatives won 16 of the 55 seats
Hillingdon	Details	Labour majority	36 of 60 seats
Hounslow	Details	Labour majority	48 of 60 seats
Islington	Details	Labour majority	60 of 60 seats
Kensington and Chelsea	Details	Conservative majority	46 of 60 seats
Kingston upon Thames	Details	Conservative majority	40 of 60 seats
Lambeth	Details	Labour majority	42 of 60 seats
Lewisham	Details	Labour majority	45 of 60 seats
Merton	Details	No overall control	Labour won 26 and Conservatives won 25 of the 54 seats
Newham	Details	Labour majority	50 of 60 seats
Redbridge	Details	Conservative majority	45 of 60 seats
Richmond upon Thames	Details	Conservative majority	41 of 54 seats
Southwark	Details	Labour majority	54 of 60 seats
Sutton	Details	Conservative majority	30 of 51 seats
Tower Hamlets	Details	Labour majority	55 of 60 seats
Waltham Forest	Details	Labour majority	36 of 48 seats
Wandsworth	Details	Labour majority	47 of 60 seats
Westminster	Details	Labour majority	41 of 60 seats
All 32 borough councils in Greater London

== English county councils ==
Council	Details	Party
Bedfordshire	Details	
Berkshire	Details	
Cambridgeshire and Isle of Ely (held on 22 September 1964)	Details	
Cheshire	Details	
Cornwall	Details	
Cumberland	Details	
Derbyshire	Details	
Devon	Details	
Dorset	Details	
Durham	Details	
East Riding	Details	
East Suffolk	Details	
East Sussex	Details	
Gloucestershire	Details	
Hampshire	Details	
Herefordshire	Details	
Hertfordshire	Details	
Holland	Details	
Huntingdon and Peterborough (held on 19 November 1964)	Details	
Isle of Wight	Details	
Kesteven	Details	
Lancashire	Details	
Leicestershire	Details	
Lindsey	Details	
Norfolk	Details	
North Riding	Details	
Northamptonshire	Details	
Northumberland	Details	
Nottinghamshire	Details	
Oxfordshire	Details	
Rutland	Details	
Shropshire	Details	
Somerset	Details	
Staffordshire	Details	
Warwickshire	Details	
West Riding	Details	
West Suffolk	Details	
West Sussex	Details	
Westmorland	Details	
Wiltshire	Details	
Worcestershire	Details	
All 42 county councils in England

== Scottish elections ==
=== County councils ===
Council	Details	Party
Aberdeenshire	Details	
Angus	Details	
Argyllshire	Details	
Ayrshire	Details	
Banffshire	Details	
Berwickshire	Details	
Buteshire	Details	
Caithness	Details	
Clackmannanshire	Details	
Dumfriesshire	Details	
Dunbartonshire	Details	
East Lothian	Details	
Fife	Details	
Inverness-shire	Details	
Kincardineshire	Details	
Kinross-shire	Details	
Kirkcudbrightshire	Details	
Lanarkshire	Details	
Midlothian	Details	
Moray	Details	
Nairnshire	Details	
Peeblesshire	Details	
Perthshire	Details	
Orkney	Details	
Renfrewshire	Details	
Ross and Cromarty	Details	
Roxburghshire	Details	
Selkirkshire	Details	
Stirlingshire	Details	
Sutherland	Details	
West Lothian	Details	
Wigtownshire	Details	
Zetland	Details	
All 33 county councils in Scotland

=== City corporations ===
Council	Details	Party
Aberdeen	Details	
Dundee	Details	
Edinburgh	Details	
Glasgow	Details	
All 4 city corporations in Scotland

== Welsh county councils ==
- Anglesey
- Brecknockshire
- Carnarvonshire
- Cardiganshire
- Carmarthenshire
- Denbighshire
- Flintshire
- Glamorganshire
- Merionethshire
- Monmouthshire
- Montgomeryshire
- Pembrokeshire
- Radnorshire

== Northern Ireland ==
- 1964 Londonderry Borough Council election

== See also ==
- 1964 United Kingdom general election
- 1964 Greater London Council election

Held one week later on 14 May 1964:

- 1964 Bury St Edmunds by-election
- 1964 Devizes by-election
- 1964 Rutherglen by-election
- 1964 Winchester by-election
