= Hillingdon London Borough Council elections =

Class of UK elections

A map showing the wards of Hillingdon from 2002-2022

The members of the Hillingdon London Borough Council in London, England are elected every four years. Since the 2022 boundary changes, the council is composed of 53 councillors.

== Council elections ==
Year	Conservative	Labour	Liberal Democrats (Note: Liberal Party, 1964–1978; SDP–Liberal Alliance, 1982–1986.)	Independent	Reform	Green (Note: Green Party, 1980–1990)	Council control after election
1964	24	36	0	0	-	-	Labour
1968	60	0	0	0	-	-	Conservative
1971	24	36	0	–	-	-	Labour
1974	28	32	0	–	-	-	Labour
1978 (Note: Boundary changes increased the number of seats by nine.)	55	14	0	–	-	-	Conservative
1982	57	10	2	–	-	-	Conservative
1986	28	34	7	0	-	0	No overall control
1990	35	34	0	0	-	0	Conservative
1994 (Note: Boundary changes took place but the number of seats remained the same.)	25	43	0	1	-	0	Labour
1998	34	31	4	0	-	0	No overall control
2002 (Note: Boundary changes reduced the number of seats by four.)	31	27	7	0	-	0	No overall control
2006	45	18	2	0	-	0	Conservative
2010	46	19	0	0	-	0	Conservative
2014	42	23	0	0	-	0	Conservative
2018	44	21	0	0	-	0	Conservative
2022 (Note: Boundary changes decreased the number of seats by twelve.)	30	23	0	0	-	0	Conservative
2026	30	16	0	0	4	1	Conservative

=== Borough result maps ===
2002 results map

2006 results map

2010 results map

2014 results map

2018 results map

2022 results map

2026 results map

== By-election results ==
=== 1964-1968 ===
There were no by-elections.

=== 1968-1971 ===
Haydon by-election, 18 July 1968
Party	Candidate	Votes	%	±%
Conservative	C. R. Brindle	1523		
Liberal	D. F. J. Wood	160		
Labour	R. A. Rosser	126		
Turnout			23.7%	

Hillingdon West by-election, 18 July 1968
Party	Candidate	Votes	%	±%
Conservative	G. M. Clark	890		
Labour	R. W. Bossom	198		
Non Party	A. H. Kurtz	12		
Turnout			13.4%	

Ickenham by-election, 18 July 1968
Party	Candidate	Votes	%	±%
Conservative	K. C. Briggs	1654		
Liberal	B. Outhwaite	272		
Labour	T. L. Morgan	221		
Turnout			29.5%	

Ruislip by-election, 18 July 1968
Party	Candidate	Votes	%	±%
Conservative	E. G. Booth	2018		
Liberal	C. A. Herring	173		
Labour	C. C. G. Barton	166		
Turnout			29.8%	

Belmore by-election, 4 March 1970
Party	Candidate	Votes	%	±%
Labour	G. A. Childs	842		
Conservative	J. L. Tyrrell	746		
Turnout			16.2%	

Hillingdon East by-election, 21 October 1970
Party	Candidate	Votes	%	±%
Labour	D. W. Heppenstall	1279		
Conservative	R. W. Hall	925		
Liberal	S. W. James	143		
Turnout			31.1%	

=== 1971-1974 ===
Frogmore by-election, 23 November 1972
Party	Candidate	Votes	%	±%
Labour	J. E. Clifford	1,510		
Conservative	A. J. T. Tyrrell	747		
National Front	J. S. Fairhurst	488		
Turnout			24.8%	

Hillingdon West by-election, 27 September 1973
Party	Candidate	Votes	%	±%
Conservative	J. A. Watts	1,247		
Labour	J. I. Rees	930		
Liberal	J. M. Price	544		
National Front	P. Marsh	128		
Turnout			31.5%	

=== 1974-1978 ===
Hillingdon East by-election, 15 August 1974
Party	Candidate	Votes	%	±%
Conservative	Terry Dicks	1,397		
Labour	Deirdre P. H. Heppenstall	1,330		
Liberal	Michael E. Ryan	403		
National Front	John S. Fairhurst	163		
Turnout			45.1	

Haydon by-election, 6 February 1975
Party	Candidate	Votes	%	±%
Conservative	Derek N. List	2,177		
Liberal	Derek J. Honeygold	512		
Labour	Jean Heather	496		
Turnout			37.6	

Northwood by-election, 8 April 1976
Party	Candidate	Votes	%	±%
Conservative	Norman C. Hawkins	3,381		
Liberal	Gordon D. Leigh	481		
Labour	Dorothy J. Blundell	419		
National Front	John S. Fairhurst	175		
Turnout			48.8	

Hayes by-election, 23 June 1977
Party	Candidate	Votes	%	±%
Conservative	Keith E. Salisbury	2,194		
Labour	Elsie E. Broughton	1,499		
National	Joseph F. Deville	140		
National Front	Peter Marsh	125		
Hayes Liberal	Marie D. Greenfield	109		
Liberal Harlington	John W. Lyford	36		
Turnout			36.0	

=== 1982-1986 ===
There were no by-elections.

=== 1990-1994 ===
Northwood Hills by-election, 26 July 1990
Party	Candidate	Votes	%	±%
Conservative	David A. Bishop	2,338	68.0	
Labour	James B. McGurk	762	22.2	
Liberal Democrats	Richard K. Drew	336	9.8	
Turnout			46.4	
Conservative hold		Swing		

The by-election was called following the resignation of Cllr Graham Sewell.

Yeading by-election, 11 July 1991
Party	Candidate	Votes	%	±%
Labour	Francis Way	1,316	50.2	
Conservative	Mary A. O'Connor	1,038	39.6	
Liberal Democrats	Michael F. Cox	266	10.2	
Turnout			40.1	
Labour hold		Swing		

The by-election was called following the resignation of Cllr John Walker.

Uxbridge South by-election, 26 September 1991
Party	Candidate	Votes	%	±%
Labour	Karen R. Livney	757	46.1	
Conservative	Karyn T. Kenway	649	39.5	
Liberal Democrats	Ann-Marie Sharkey	164	10.0	
Green	William G. Cheesbrough	71	4.3	
Turnout			39.0	
Labour hold		Swing		

The by-election was called following the death of Cllr Gordon Bogan.

St Martins by-election, 22 April 1993
Party	Candidate	Votes	%	±%
Conservative	Philip N. Corthorne	1,475	50.8	
Labour	John V. Morse	1,096	37.7	
Liberal Democrats	Harry Davies	303	10.4	
Independent	Diane I. Greenwood	31	1.1	
Turnout			50.3	
Conservative hold		Swing		

The by-election was called following the death of Cllr Derek Tow.

Harefield by-election, 12 August 1993
Party	Candidate	Votes	%	±%
Labour	Pauline D. Crawley	1,339	49.0	
Conservative	Patricia J. Spargo	866	31.7	
Liberal Democrats	Jill Rhodes	411	15.0	
Green	Ian E. Flindall	117	4.3	
Turnout			56.4	
Labour gain from Conservative		Swing		

The by-election was called following the death of Cllr Kenneth Abel.

=== 1994-1998 ===
Crane by-election, 19 October 1995
Party	Candidate	Votes	%	±%
Labour	John L. Oswell	1,179		
Conservative	Derek D. Baxter	341		
Militant Labour	Derek J. Marsdon	132		
Liberal Democrats	Peter J. Dollimore	121		
Turnout				
Labour hold		Swing		

The by-election was called following the death of Cllr Christopher Mullen.

Barnhill by-election, 13 June 1996
Party	Candidate	Votes	%	±%
Labour	John R. Major	1,773	73.5	
Conservative	Andrew P. Teebay	376	15.6	
Liberal Democrats	Andrew Vernazza	143	5.9	
Militant Labour	Sarah E. King	120		
Majority		1,397	57.9	
Turnout		2,292	36.4	
Labour hold		Swing		

The by-election was called following the resignation of Cllr Gulab Sharma.

Heathrow by-election, 6 November 1997
Party	Candidate	Votes	%	±%
Labour	Michael S. Usher	770	64.3	+3.8
Conservative	Mary A. O'Connor	332	27.7	−4.1
Liberal Democrats	Peter J. Dollimore	95	7.9	+7.9
Majority		438	36.6	
Turnout		1,197	21.2	
Labour hold		Swing		

The by-election was called following the death of Cllr Philip Kordun.

=== 1998-2002 ===
Yiewsley by-election, 25 June 1998
Party	Candidate	Votes	%	±%
Labour	Paul K. Harmsworth	777	44.2	+1.2
Conservative	Brian A. Wing	734	41.8	−2.5
Liberal Democrats	Christopher Gee	245	14.0	+1.3
Majority		43	2.4	
Turnout		1,756	34.1	
Labour gain from Conservative		Swing		

The by-election was called following the disqualification of Cllr Mark Chester.

Botwell by-election, 30 March 2000
Party	Candidate	Votes	%	±%
Labour	Norman Nunn-Price	661	49.4	−22.4
Conservative	Michael J. Gibson	258	19.3	−8.9
Socialist (GB)	Walter D. Kennedy	233	17.4	+17.4
Liberal Democrats	Michael Cox	186	13.9	+13.9
Majority		403	30.1	
Turnout		1,338	27.6	
Labour hold		Swing		

The by-election was called following the resignation of Cllr Timothy Freeman.

=== 2002-2006 ===
Heathrow Villages by-election, 4 July 2002
Party	Candidate	Votes	%	±%
Labour	Roderick P. Marshall	1,011	43.8	+4.8
Liberal Democrats	Anthony J. Little	688	29.8	+20.1
Conservative	Geraldine Nicholson	466	20.2	+0.0
Green	Graham Gilbert	92	4.0	−3.5
BNP	Francis S. McAllister	49	2.1	−4.2
Majority		323	14.0	
Turnout		2,306	29.6	
Labour hold		Swing		

The by-election was called following the resignation of Cllr Jagjit Sidhu.

South Ruislip by-election, 29 April 2004
Party	Candidate	Votes	%	±%
Liberal Democrats	John O. Curley	1,016	34.3	+12.4
Conservative	Graham E. M. Horn	899	30.4	−12.8
Labour	Anne O'Shea	526	17.8	−20.8
BNP	Gareth Jones	434	14.7	+14.7
Green	Graham J. Lee	86	2.9	−4.4
Majority		117	3.9	
Turnout		2,961	36.2	
Liberal Democrats gain from Conservative		Swing		

The by-election was called following the death of Cllr James O'Neill

Cavendish by-election, 17 February 2005
Party	Candidate	Votes	%	±%
Conservative	Michael R. White	1,340	42.7	+0.6
Liberal Democrats	Alan S. Graham	1,245	39.7	−6.2
Labour	Alan K. Gilbert	299	9.5	−2.6
National Front	Peter Shaw	188	5.9	+5.9
Green	Graham J. Lee	65	2.1	+2.1
Majority		95	3.0	
Turnout		3,137	37.4	
Conservative hold		Swing		

The by-election was called following the death of Cllr Margaret Grant.

=== 2006-2010 ===
Townfield by-election, 17 July 2008
Party	Candidate	Votes	%	±%
Labour	Tony Eginton	1,031	45.3	−12.6
Liberal Democrats	Roy Chamdal	506	22.2	+8.7
Conservative	Kashmir Pahal	445	19.6	−9.0
BNP	Denis Macdonald	186	8.2	+8.2
National Front	Andrew Cripps	74	3.3	+3.3
Green	Catriona Corfield	33	1.5	+1.5
Majority		525	23.1	
Turnout		2,275	25.0	
Labour hold		Swing		

The by-election was called following the death of Cllr Norman Nunn-Price.

West Ruislip by-election, 2 October 2008
Party	Candidate	Votes	%	±%
Conservative	John Riley	1351		
Liberal Democrats	Adrian K. Betts	860		
Labour	John P. Campbell	147		
BNP	Denis N. Macdonald	111		
Green	Graham J. Lee	55		
National Front	Ian Edward	52		
Turnout				
Conservative hold		Swing		

The by-election was called following the death of Cllr Solveig Stone.

Northwood by-election, 11 December 2008
Party	Candidate	Votes	%	±%
Conservative	Carol Melvin	1216		
Liberal Democrats	Alan Prue	466		
Labour	Robert Nunn	116		
Green	Graham Lee	66		
Independent	Francis Mcallistair	25		
Turnout				
Conservative hold		Swing		

The by-election was called following the disqualification of Cllr Ian Oakley.

=== 2014-2018 ===
Charville by-election, 27 November 2014
Party	Candidate	Votes	%	±%
Labour	John Oswell	950	39.2	+4.3
Conservative	Mary O'Connor	929	38.3	+7.0
UKIP	Cliff Dixon	468	19.3	−3.0
TUSC	Wally Kennedy	40	1.7	−1.2
Liberal Democrats	Paul McKeown	37	1.5	+1.5
Majority		21	0.9	
Turnout		2,424		
Labour hold		Swing		

By-election triggered by resignation of Labour councillor David Horne.

=== 2018-2022 ===
Hillingdon East by-election, 27 February 2020
Party	Candidate	Votes	%	±%
Conservative	Colleen Sullivan	1,430	68.8	+9.1
Labour	Annelise Roberts	488	23.5	−12.7
Liberal Democrats	Chris Hooper	86	4.1	+4.1
Green	Mark Keir	59	2.8	+2.8
UKIP	Geoff Courtenay	16	0.8	+0.8
Majority		942	45.3	
Turnout		2,079		
Conservative hold		Swing		

By-election triggered by resignation of Conservative councillor Pat Jackson.

Charville by-election, 6 May 2021
Party	Candidate	Votes	%	±%
Conservative	Darran Davies	2,098	49.6	+0.6
Labour	Steve Garelick	1,799	42.5	−3.3
Green	John Bowman	164	3.9	−1.3
Liberal Democrats	Alexander Cunliffe	107	2.5	+2.5
Independent	Tiffany Rytter	61	1.4	+1.4
Majority		299	7.1	
Turnout		4,229		
Conservative hold		Swing		

By-election triggered by death of Conservative councillor Neil Fyfe.

=== 2022-2026 ===
Hillingdon East by-election, 2 May 2024
Party	Candidate	Votes	%	±%
Conservative	Kelly Martin	2,911	58.1	+0.5
Labour	Steve Garelick	1,364	27.2	−8.7
Green	Sarah Green	363	7.2	+7.2
Liberal Democrats	Tom Cottew	270	5.4	+5.4
Independent	Geoff Courtenay	103	2.1	+2.1
Majority		1,547	30.9	
Turnout		5,011		
Conservative hold		Swing		

By-election triggered by resignation of Conservative councillor Alan Chapman.
