= 1967 Londonderry Borough Council election =

Local govt election in Northern Ireland

Results by ward.

Elections to Londonderry Borough Council were held on 17 May 1967, amidst the Northern Ireland civil rights movement.

The election would be the last for the unreformed Londonderry Borough Council, with local government in Northern Ireland being reformed from 1969 onwards. The council elected was the last with a Unionist majority. Albert Anderson continued as Mayor.

The Northern Ireland Labour Party stood for the first time in local elections in the city. It made a particularly strong showing under its local party chairman, Willie Breslin, with the party taking 30% of the vote. Due to the electoral system however the party failed to win any seats. The Ulster Unionist Party stood in both wards with a unionist majority, and the Nationalist Party only in the one ward with a nationalist majority. Two independent candidates also stood.

== Results ==
The final result saw no change from the previous election, which had been held in 1964 and in which no seats had been contested. Two of the Nationalist Party councillors were new, with Mary Harrigan being the first woman to serve on the council since 1926.

Londonderry Borough Council election, 1967
Party	Seats	Gains	Losses	Net gain/loss	Seats %	Votes %	Votes	+/−
UUP	12	0	0	0	66.7	32.2	25,535	
Nationalist	8	0	0	0	33.3	33.9	26,880	
NI Labour	0	0	0	0	0.0	31.9	25,296	
Registered electors		23,312						
Turnout		16,263	69.76%					

The 1969 report by Lord Cameron into "Disturbances in Northern Ireland" (paragraph 134) gives the total electorate as 23,210 rather than 23,312, and divides the 23,210 into 14,429 Catholic voters and 8,781 Other voters.

== Ward results ==
=== North Ward ===
North Ward - results by party 8 Councillors
Party	Seats	Gains	Losses	Net gain/loss	Seats %	Votes %	Votes	+/−
Ulster Unionist Party	8	0	0	0	100.0		17,198	
Northern Ireland Labour Party	0	0	0	0	0.0		7,861	
Independent	0	0	0	0	0.0		1,227	
Registered electors		6,476						
Turnout		4,648	71.77%					
Total valid votes		4,582	70.75%					

The 1969 report by Lord Cameron into "Disturbances in Northern Ireland" (paragraph 134) divides the total ward electorate of 6,476 into 2,530 Catholic voters and 3,946 Other voters.

North Ward 6 elected Councillors
Party	Candidate	Votes	%	±%
UUP	John A. Allen	2,768	60.41	
UUP	William Beatty	2,908	63.47	
UUP	John A. Canning	2,907	63.44	
UUP	Robert Stewart	2,832	61.81	
UUP	Alfred Wallace	2,877	62.79	
UUP	James J. Whyte	2,906	63.42	
NI Labour	Ivan Cooper	1,328	28.98	
NI Labour	Ernest G. Cowan	1,228	26.80	
NI Labour	Henry L. Doherty	1,434	31.30	
NI Labour	Richard J. Foster	1,258	27.46	
NI Labour	George S. Stewart	1,289	28.13	
NI Labour	Janet Wilcock	1,324	28.90	
Independent	George C. Austin	1,227	26.78	
Total votes		26,286		
Total valid votes		4,582		

=== South Ward ===
South Ward - results by party 8 Councillors
Party	Seats	Gains	Losses	Net gain/loss	Seats %	Votes %	Votes	+/−
Nationalist Party (Northern Ireland)	8	0	0	0	100.0		26,880	
Northern Ireland Labour Party	0	0	0	0	0.0		14,174	
Registered electors		11,287						
Turnout		7,487	66.33%					
Total valid votes		7,160	63.44					

The 1969 report by Lord Cameron into "Disturbances in Northern Ireland" (paragraph 134) gives the total ward electorate as 11,185 rather than 11,287, and divides the 11,185 into 10,047 Catholic voters and 1,138 Other voters.

South Ward 6 Councillors Electorate: 6,476
Party	Candidate	Votes	%	±%
Nationalist	James Doherty	4,692	65.53	
Nationalist	James R. Doherty	4,552	63.58	
Nationalist	Patrick Friel	4,624	64.58	
Nationalist	Mary Harrigan	4,293	59.96	
Nationalist	Thomas McDonnell	4,282	59.80	
Nationalist	Michael Eugene O'Hare	4,437	59.80	
NI Labour	Edward J. Campbell	2,145	29.96	
NI Labour	Joseph Doherty	2,701	29.96	
NI Labour	Paul Grace	2,402	33.55	
NI Labour	Charles V. Grant	2,286	31.93	
NI Labour	Jeremiah Mallett	2,244	31.34	
NI Labour	Barry McLaughlin	2,396	33.46	
Total votes		41,054		

=== Waterside Ward ===
Waterside Ward 4 Councillors
Party	Seats	Gains	Losses	Net gain/loss	Seats %	Votes %	Votes	+/−
Ulster Unionist Party	4	0	0	0	100.0		8,337	
Northern Ireland Labour Party	0	0	0	0	0.0		3,261	
Independent	0	0	0	0	0.0		234	
Registered electors		5,549						
Turnout		4,128	74.39%					
Total valid votes		4,101	73.91%					

The 1969 report by Lord Cameron into "Disturbances in Northern Ireland" (paragraph 134) divides the total ward electorate of 5,549 into 1,852 Catholic voters and 3,697 Other voters.

Waterside Ward 3 elected Councillors
Party	Candidate	Votes	%	±%
UUP	Albert Wesley Anderson	2,740	66.81	
UUP	Leonard Hutchinson	2,834	69.11	
UUP	John T. McParland	2,763	67.37	
NI Labour	James B. Hinds	1,116	27.21	
NI Labour	John I. Hutchinson	1,057	25.77	
NI Labour	Michael T. Roddy	1,088	26.53	
Independent	Denis Colclough	234	5.71	
Total votes		11,832		

== Notes ==
1. Voters in North and South wards could each vote for up to 6 candidates and voters in Waterside ward could vote for up to 3 candidates. As a result totals for registered electors and turnout do not bear a direct relation to votes.

2. Two aldermen were elected unopposed in each of the North ward and the South ward and one alderman was elected unopposed in the Waterside ward.

3. The Derry Journal gives 25,550 as the total of 17,198 (North ward) and 8,337 (Waterside ward).
