= 1968 Hillingdon London Borough Council election =

← 1964	9 May 1968	1971 →
	First party	Second party
Party	Labour	Conservative
Last election	36	24
Seats won	0	60
Seat change	-36	+36

The 1968 Hillingdon Council election took place on 9 May 1968 to elect members of Hillingdon London Borough Council in London, England. The whole council was up for election and the Conservative party gained overall control of the council.

== Election result ==
1968 Hillingdon Council Election
Party	Seats	Gains	Losses	Net gain/loss	Seats %	Votes %	Votes	+/−
Conservative	60	36	0	+36	100.0			+150%
Labour	0	0	36	-36	0.0			-100%
Liberal	0	0	0	0	0.0			
Communist	0	0	0	0	0.0			
Independent	0	0	0	0	0.0			
Total	60							

== Ward results ==
=== Belmore ===
Belmore (4)
Party	Candidate	Votes	%	±%
Conservative	R. C. Ellis	1,824	15.26	N/A
Conservative	P. H. King	1,758	14.71	32.36
Conservative	S. K. Hand	1,740	14.56	N/A
Conservative	A. L. Runnicles	1,731	14.48	N/A
Labour	Mrs E. E. Broughton	1,268	10.61	−55
Labour	M. C. Craxton	1,168	9.77	N/A
Labour	R. V. A. McGuire	1,137	9.51	N/A
Labour	S. Gelburg	1,125	9.41	N/A
Communist	E. G. Brooks	201	1.68	−6.6
Turnout		3165	44.6%	+20.2
Registered electors		9,904		−0.35
Conservative gain from Labour		Swing		
Conservative gain from Labour		Swing		
Conservative gain from Labour		Swing		
Conservative gain from Labour		Swing		

=== Colham-Cowley ===
Colham-Cowley (3)
Party	Candidate	Votes	%	±%
Conservative	Mrs. N. C. Coles	2,048		N/A
Conservative	Mrs. E. G. Boff	2,044		N/A
Conservative	J. W. Hayton	2,001		N/A
Labour	L. J. Davies	1,216		−31.1
Labour	F. J. Mitchell	1,124		N/A
Labour	W. G. Price	1,103		N/A
Turnout				
Registered electors				
Conservative gain from Labour		Swing		
Conservative gain from Labour		Swing		
Conservative gain from Labour		Swing		

=== Eastcote ===
Eastcote (3)
Party	Candidate	Votes	%	±%
Conservative	L. J. Lally	3,130		20.3
Conservative	Miss B. A. Double	3,120		24
Conservative	G. A. L. Sullivan	3,095		25.7
Liberal	A. P. Douglas	613		N/A
Liberal	G. Thomas	585		13.8
Liberal	M. Cole	577		N/A
Labour	E. P. Wohlfarth	413		−64.2
Labour	T. E. Tolchard	411		N/A
Labour	J. Jones	387		N/A
Turnout				
Registered electors				
Conservative hold		Swing		
Conservative hold		Swing		
Conservative hold		Swing		

=== Frogmore ===
Frogmore (4)
Party	Candidate	Votes	%	±%
Conservative	Mrs. I. L. Murray	2,301		103.6
Conservative	L. F. Redding	2,247		103.3
Conservative	E. J. A. Webb	2,202		
Conservative	Mrs. A. B. Palmer	2,195		N/A
Labour	E. J. Vance	1,680		−35.6
Labour	K. A. Gigg	1,658		
Labour	B. Shaw	1,640		
Labour	E. A. J. Harris	1,601		
Communist	Mrs. R. D. Currell			
Turnout				
Registered electors				
Conservative gain from Labour		Swing		
Conservative gain from Labour		Swing		
Conservative gain from Labour		Swing		
Conservative gain from Labour		Swing		

=== Harefield ===
Harefield (2)
Party	Candidate	Votes	%	±%
Conservative	J. R. W. Cox	1,216		
Conservative	D. E. James	1,072		
Labour	G. E. Preston	787		
Labour	Mrs. J. E. Gooch	675		
Turnout				
Registered electors				
Conservative gain from Labour		Swing		
Conservative gain from Labour		Swing		

=== Haydon ===
Haydon (3)
Party	Candidate	Votes	%	±%
Conservative	W. D. Charles	2,985		
Conservative	Dr. C. H. Nemeth	2,982		
Conservative	J. A. Woolf	2,926		
Liberal	D. F. J. Wood	399		
Liberal	D. J. Honeygold	362		
Liberal	M. V. Gwyn	340		
Labour	R. A. Rosser	284		
Labour	J. G. Bartlett	274		
Labour	P. K. Harmsworth	273		
Turnout				
Registered electors				
Conservative hold		Swing		
Conservative hold		Swing		
Conservative hold		Swing		

=== Hayes ===
Hayes (4)
Party	Candidate	Votes	%	±%
Conservative	K. E. Salisbury	2,101		
Conservative	R. S. Treloar	2,079		
Conservative	E. Stanmore	2,076		
Conservative	G. F. Farr	2,073		
Labour	G. A. Childs	1,525		
Labour	O. Garvin	1,511		
Labour	E. A. Wiltshire	1,455		
Labour	R. J. Came	1,454		
Communist	E. W. Edwards	255		
Turnout				
Registered electors				
Conservative gain from Labour		Swing		
Conservative gain from Labour		Swing		
Conservative gain from Labour		Swing		
Conservative gain from Labour		Swing		

=== Hillingdon East ===
Hillingdon East (3)
Party	Candidate	Votes	%	±%
Conservative	J. H. Green	1,992		
Conservative	J. C. Garside	1,922		
Conservative	M. A. Searls	1,881		
Labour	T. L. Morgan	1,233		
Labour	R. W. Blossom	1,219		
Labour	A. J. Ball			
Turnout				
Registered electors				
Conservative gain from Labour		Swing		
Conservative gain from Labour		Swing		
Conservative gain from Labour		Swing		

=== Hillingdon West ===
Hillingdon West (3)
Party	Candidate	Votes	%	±%
Conservative	G. P. Buttrum	2,741		
Conservative	J. H. Wells	2,730		
Conservative	Mrs. L. E. Wane	2,695		
Labour	D. W. Heppenstall	644		
Labour	R. G. W. Carlier	622		
Labour	M. S. Came	621		
Turnout				
Registered electors				
Conservative hold		Swing		
Conservative hold		Swing		
Conservative hold		Swing		

=== Ickenham ===
Ickenham (3)
Party	Candidate	Votes	%	±%
Conservative	E. L. Ing	3,536		
Conservative	J. E. Skidmore	3,421		
Conservative	J. R. Payton	3,420		
Liberal	B. Outhwaite	799		
Liberal	L. W. Smith	777		
Liberal	A. J. Kent	736		
Labour	F. Irwin	473		
Labour	Mrs. M. B. Jones	411		
Labour	P. L. N. Smith	342		
Turnout				
Registered electors				
Conservative hold		Swing		
Conservative hold		Swing		
Conservative hold		Swing		

=== Manor ===
Manor (3)
Party	Candidate	Votes	%	±%
Conservative	K. I. D. Double	2,644		
Conservative	N. H. Butler	2,636		
Conservative	E. Hales	2,630		
Labour	F. H. Rapley	836		
Labour	L. J. Stent	796		
Labour	Miss E. G. White	774		
Liberal	C. A. Herring	559		
Liberal	Mrs. M. B. Locke	558		
Liberal	A. J. Tett	531		
Turnout				
Registered electors				
Conservative hold		Swing		
Conservative hold		Swing		
Conservative hold		Swing		

=== Northwood ===
Northwood (3)
Party	Candidate	Votes	%	±%
Conservative	C. C. Rogers	3,494		
Conservative	G. N. White	3,429		
Conservative	P. G. Kittel	3,426		
Liberal	G. D. Leigh	355		
Liberal	J. Good	336		
Liberal	G. Jones	301		
Labour	Mrs. K. Dallas	209		
Labour	Mrs. J. Green	197		
Labour	Mrs. M. M. Bartlett	186		
Turnout				
Registered electors				
Conservative hold		Swing		
Conservative hold		Swing		
Conservative hold		Swing		

=== Ruislip ===
Ruislip (3)
Party	Candidate	Votes	%	±%
Conservative	E. A. Daniell	3,446		
Conservative	P. W. Jobling	3,373		
Conservative	C. A. Smith	3,334		
Liberal	S. H. Davidson	512		
Liberal	H. J. Evans	402		
Liberal	Miss E. I. Pearce	396		
Labour	A. T. Blundell	286		
Labour	C. C. G. Barton	268		
Labour	G. Walford			
Turnout				
Registered electors				
Conservative hold		Swing		
Conservative hold		Swing		
Conservative hold		Swing		

=== South ===
South (4)
Party	Candidate	Votes	%	±%
Conservative	H. G. P. Manders	2,751		
Conservative	Mrs. S. Ensch	2,699		
Conservative	C. C. Vennell	2,648		
Conservative	R. A. Montague	2,639		
Labour	D. P. Flory	1,626		
Labour	J. H. C. Key	1,584		
Labour	J. E. E. Walters	1,528		
Labour	M. C. Wheeler	1,515		
Communist	C. G. Smith			
Turnout				
Registered electors				
Conservative gain from Labour		Swing		
Conservative gain from Labour		Swing		
Conservative gain from Labour		Swing		
Conservative gain from Labour		Swing		

=== South Ruislip ===
South Ruislip (4)
Party	Candidate	Votes	%	±%
Conservative	M. H. Blackman	2,524		
Conservative	J. W. Johnson	2,492		
Conservative	B. C. W. Reid	2,468		
Conservative	Mrs. D. G. E. Surman	2,441		
Labour	N. A. Mulliner	1,568		
Labour	F. A. Cooper	1,564		
Labour	R. H. Collman	1,552		
Labour	A. L. Bound	1,532		
Liberal	Miss M. Avery	485		
Liberal	Mrs. B. Downes	454		
Liberal	K. R. Meredith	423		
Liberal	A. R. Pope	415		
Turnout				
Registered electors				
Conservative gain from Labour		Swing		
Conservative gain from Labour		Swing		
Conservative gain from Labour		Swing		
Conservative gain from Labour		Swing		

=== Uxbridge ===
Uxbridge (3)
Party	Candidate	Votes	%	±%
Conservative	A. R. Buckeldee	2,458		
Conservative	Mrs. B. M. Thorndike	2,242		
Conservative	R. S. B. Shepard	2,225		
Labour	K. R. Griffiths	566		
Labour	A. S. How	550		
Liberal	J. B. Leno	540		
Liberal	R. Pinkney	449		
Labour	Mrs. A. Schaverien	525		
Communist	J. J. Thompson	170		
Turnout				
Registered electors				
Conservative hold		Swing		
Conservative hold		Swing		
Conservative hold		Swing		

=== Yeading ===
Yeading (4)
Party	Candidate	Votes	%	±%
Conservative	P. C. Heath	1,966		
Conservative	F. G. Murray	1,922		
Conservative	A. J. Tyrell	1,876		
Conservative	F. V. M. Carroll	1,794		
Labour	S. G. Chilton	1,597		
Labour	H. R. Hann	1,498		
Labour	C. Somers	1,476		
Labour	R. Williams	1,435		
Independent	A. H. Kurtz	338		
Communist	P. R. Pink	164		
Turnout				
Registered electors				
Conservative gain from Labour		Swing		
Conservative gain from Labour		Swing		
Conservative gain from Labour		Swing		
Conservative gain from Labour		Swing		

=== Yiewsley ===
Yiewsley (4)
Party	Candidate	Votes	%	±%
Conservative	D. P. Cloet	2,549		
Conservative	R. C. Foote	2,548		
Conservative	N. C. Hawkins	2,476		
Conservative	E. G. S. Dommett	2,448		
Labour	T. Cluny	1,704		
Labour	J. Rowe	1,557		
Labour	A. J. Potts	1,506		
Labour	A. J. Ainsworth	1,445		
Turnout				
Registered electors				
Conservative gain from Labour		Swing		
Conservative gain from Labour		Swing		
Conservative gain from Labour		Swing		
Conservative gain from Labour		Swing		
