= 1964 Londonderry Borough Council election =

Local govt election in Northern Ireland

Elections to Londonderry Borough Council were held in 1964 alongside nationwide elections. Albert Anderson continued as Mayor.

== Results ==
No seats were contested, and twelve Unionists and eight Nationalists were returned unopposed.

== Estimates of political affiliation of the electorate ==
The following estimates of the political affiliation of the electorate were published by The Campaign for Social Justice in Northern Ireland in 1965. It divides the electorate into Unionists and Nationalists.

- Unionists - 12 seats - 9,235 voters - 39.2 %
- Nationalists - 8 seats - 14,325 voters - 60.8 %
- Total - 20 seats - 23,560 voters

However, when all of the wards were contested in the next election in 1967, the Ulster Unionist Party won 32.2% of the vote, the Nationalist Party (Northern Ireland) won 33.9% of the vote and the Northern Ireland Labour Party won 31.9% of the vote.

== Ward Estimates ==
=== North Ward ===
8 Councillors

- Unionists - 4,355 voters
- Nationalists - 2,356 voters

=== South Ward ===
8 Councillors

- Nationalists - 10,130 voters
- Unionists - 1,260 voters

=== Waterside Ward ===
4 Councillors

- Unionists - 3,620 voters
- Nationalists - 1,839 voters
