= Park (Greenwich ward) =

- Former electoral ward for the Greenwich London Borough Council
- Borough: Greenwich
- County: Greater London

Former electoral ward
- Created: 1965
- Abolished: 1978
- Councillors: 2

External image
- Map showing Park ward boundaries from 1965 to 1978

Park was an electoral ward in the London Borough of Greenwich from 1965 to 1978. The ward was first used in the 1964 elections and last used for the 1974 elections. It returned two councillors to Greenwich London Borough Council.

== Ward results ==
=== 1974 election ===
The election took place on 2 May 1974.

1974 Greenwich London Borough Council election: Park
Party	Candidate	Votes	%	±%
Labour	F. Smith	900		
Labour	M. Bourne	875		
Conservative	J. Sumption	449		
Conservative	J. Platts	428		
Liberal	A. Wilson	300		
Liberal	K. Richardson	268		
Turnout				
Labour hold		Swing		
Labour hold		Swing		

=== 1971 election ===
The election took place on 13 May 1971.

1971 Greenwich London Borough Council election: Park
Party	Candidate	Votes	%	±%
Labour	E. Razzell	1,555		
Labour	J. Rees	1,538		
Conservative	K. Ross	541		
Conservative	K. Valpy	499		
Turnout				
Labour gain from Conservative		Swing		
Labour gain from Conservative		Swing		

=== 1968 election ===
The election took place on 9 May 1968.

1968 Greenwich London Borough Council election: Park
Party	Candidate	Votes	%	±%
Conservative	D. Mills	824		
Conservative	K. Ross	810		
Labour	D. Grant	572		
Labour	H. Coutts	563		
Liberal	P. Field	67		
Turnout				
Conservative gain from Labour		Swing		
Conservative gain from Labour		Swing		

=== 1964 election ===
The election took place on 7 May 1964.

1964 Greenwich London Borough Council election: Park
Party	Candidate	Votes	%	±%
Labour	H. Icough	1,058		
Labour	H. Coutts	1,057		
Conservative	C. Jones	380		
Conservative	T. Wykes	346		
Communist	E. Filer	70		
Turnout		1,502	27.1	
Labour win (new seat)				
Labour win (new seat)				
