= 1964 Edinburgh Corporation election =

Local election in Scotland

- 5 May 1964

23 of the 69 seats to the Edinburgh Corporation 35 seats needed for a majority
	First party	Second party	Third party
Party	Progressives	Labour	Liberal
Last election	33	31	5
Seats won	14	8	0
Seats after	33	32	4
Seat change	Steady	▲1	▼1
Popular vote	59,003	51,498	17,023
Percentage	45.8%	40.0%	13.2%
- Results by ward.
Council control before election
No overall control
Council control after election
No overall control

An election to the Edinburgh Corporation was held on 5 May 1964, alongside municipal elections across Scotland. Of the councils 69 seats, 23 were up for election.

After the election Edinburgh Corporation remained under No Overall Control, composed of 33 Progressives, 31 Labour councillors, and 5 Liberal.

== Aggregate results ==
Edinburgh Corporation election, 1964
Party	Seats	Gains	Losses	Net gain/loss	Seats %	Votes %	Votes	+/−
Progressives	14	1	1	Steady	60.9	45.8	59,003	
Labour	9	1	0	▲1	34.8	39.1	51,498	
Liberal	0	0	1	▼1	0.0	13.2	17,023	
Communist	0	0	0	Steady	0.0	1.0	1,312	

== Ward results ==
Location of Broughton ward

Broughton
Party	Candidate	Votes	%
Progressives	Leonard Bailey	2,949	
Liberal	Violet MacInnes	1,593	
Majority		1,356	
Turnout			35.56
Progressives hold			

Location of Calton ward

Calton
Party	Candidate	Votes	%
Labour	Philip Wood	2,544	
Progressives	Daniel Buchanan	2,450	
Majority		94	
Turnout			44.09
Progressives hold			

Location of Central Leith ward

Central Leith
Party	Candidate	Votes	%
Labour	Barbara Woodburn	3,056	
Progressives	Michael Doyle	855	
Communist	Theodore Taylor	141	
Majority		2,201	
Turnout			35.29
Labour hold			

Location of Colinton ward

Colinton
Party	Candidate	Votes	%
Progressives	Catherine Filsell	4,098	
Labour	Harold Hauxwell	3,607	
Liberal	John Henderson	1,016	
Majority		491	
Turnout			49.5
Progressives hold			

Location of Corstorphine ward

Corstorphine
Party	Candidate	Votes	%
Progressives	Harold Oppenheim	4,523	
Liberal	Thomas Frew	2,599	
Labour	David Millar	1,633	
Majority		1,924	
Turnout			55.27
Progressives hold			

Location of Craigentinny ward

Craigentinny
Party	Candidate	Votes	%
Labour	Marion Alexander	4,563	
Progressives	John Bailey	2,264	
Majority		2,299	
Turnout			46.72
Labour hold			

Location of Craigmillar ward

Craigmillar
Party	Candidate	Votes	%
Labour	John Kane	2,865	
Communist	Michael D'Arcy	124	
Majority		2,741	
Turnout			31.54
Labour hold			

Location of George Square ward

George Square
Party	Candidate	Votes	%
Progressives	James Slack	2,109	
Liberal	John Gray	1,632	
Majority		477	
Turnout			34.38
Progressives hold			

Location of Gorgie-Dalry ward

Gorgie-Dalry
Party	Candidate	Votes	%
Progressives	Donald Swanson	3,316	
Liberal	George Smith	1,553	
Communist	Charles Cummings	248	
Majority		1,763	
Turnout			36.47
Labour hold			

Location of Holyrood ward

Holyrood
Party	Candidate	Votes	%
Labour	Patrick Rogan	2,272	
Communist	John Ashton	161	
Majority		2,211	
Turnout			27.86
Labour hold			

Location of Liberton ward

Liberton
Party	Candidate	Votes	%
Labour	Peter Wilson	5,708	
Liberal	Kenneth Johnston	2,349	
Majority			
Turnout			39.99
Labour hold			

Location of Merchiston ward

Merchiston
Party	Candidate	Votes	%
Progressives	Maurice Heggle	3,471	
Labour	Sylvia Renilson	1,259	
Majority		2,212	
Turnout			41.35
Progressives hold			

Location of Morningside ward

Morningside
Party	Candidate	Votes	%
Progressives	Nansi Mansbridge	4,183	
Liberal	Margaret Mackay	1,267	
Majority			
Turnout			41.1
Progressives hold			

Location of Murrayfield-Cramond ward

Murrayfield-Cramond
Party	Candidate	Votes	%
Progressives	James McKay	5,775	
Labour	James Renilson	2,888	
Majority		2,887	
Turnout		8,663	47.66
Progressives hold			

Location of Newington ward

Newington
Party	Candidate	Votes	%
Progressives	George Hedderwick	4,162	
Liberal	Margaret Workman	2,052	
Labour	Christina Guest	1,770	
Majority		2,110	
Turnout			49.57
Liberal hold			

Location of Pilton ward

Pilton
Party	Candidate	Votes	%
Labour	Magnus Williamson	4,937	
Communist	Charles McManus	638	
Majority		4,299	
Turnout			32.24
Labour hold			

Location of Portobello ward

Portobello
Party	Candidate	Votes	%
Progressives	Archibald Jameson	4,383	
Labour	Phyllis Herriot	4,018	
Majority		365	
Turnout			46.41
Progressives hold			

Location of Sighthill ward

Sighthill
Party	Candidate	Votes	%
Labour	Isabella Stewart	Unopposed	
Labour hold			

Location of South Leith

South Leith
Party	Candidate	Votes	%
Labour	Anne Simpson	4,103	
Progressives	David McKay	2,582	
Liberal	William Kerr	1,521	
Majority			
Turnout			53.13
Labour gain from Progressives			

Location of St Andrews ward

St. Andrews
Party	Candidate	Votes	%
Progressives	Craig Richards	1,799	
Labour	James Merrilees	951	
Majority			
Turnout			25.88
Progressives hold			

Location of St Bernards ward

St. Bernards
Party	Candidate	Votes	%
Progressives	John Millar	3,979	
Labour	Eva Gibbons	2,243	
Liberal	John Kidd	1,441	
Majority		1736	
Turnout			43.24
Progressives hold			

Location of St Giles ward

St. Giles
Party	Candidate	Votes	%
Labour	John Henderson	2,322	
Progressives	William Sinclair	906	
Majority		1,416	
Turnout			27.12
Labour hold			

Location of West Leith ward

West Leith
Party	Candidate	Votes	%
Progressives	Margaret Rose	3,783	
Labour	Shelia Murray	2,175	
Majority		1,608	
Turnout			50.95
Progressives hold			
