= 1974 Greenwich London Borough Council election =

The 1974 Greenwich Council election took place on 2 May 1974 to elect members of Greenwich London Borough Council in London, England. The whole council was up for election and the Labour party stayed in overall control of the council.

== Ward results ==
Abbey Wood (3)
Party	Candidate	Votes	%	±%

Academy (2)
Party	Candidate	Votes	%	±%

Blackheath (2)
Party	Candidate	Votes	%	±%

Charlton (2)
Party	Candidate	Votes	%	±%

Coldharbour (2)
Party	Candidate	Votes	%	±%

Eastcombe (2)
Party	Candidate	Votes	%	±%

Eltham (2)
Party	Candidate	Votes	%	±%

Eynsham (2)
Party	Candidate	Votes	%	±%

Hornfair (2)
Party	Candidate	Votes	%	±%

Horn Park (2)
Party	Candidate	Votes	%	±%

Kidbrooke (3)
Party	Candidate	Votes	%	±%

Marsh (2)
Party	Candidate	Votes	%	±%

Middle Park (2)
Party	Candidate	Votes	%	±%

New Eltham (3)
Party	Candidate	Votes	%	±%

Park (2)
Party	Candidate	Votes	%	±%
Labour	F. Smith	900		
Labour	M. Bourne	875		
Conservative	J. Sumption	449		
Conservative	J. Platts	428		
Liberal	A. Wilson	300		
Liberal	K. Richardson	268		
Turnout				
Labour hold		Swing		
Labour hold		Swing		

St George's (2)
Party	Candidate	Votes	%	±%

St Margaret's (3)
Party	Candidate	Votes	%	±%

St Mary's (3)
Party	Candidate	Votes	%	±%

St Nicholas (3)
Party	Candidate	Votes	%	±%

Sherard (2)
Party	Candidate	Votes	%	±%

Shooters Hill (2)
Party	Candidate	Votes	%	±%

Slade (2)
Party	Candidate	Votes	%	±%

Trafalgar (2)
Party	Candidate	Votes	%	±%

Vanbrugh (2)
Party	Candidate	Votes	%	±%

Well Hall (2)
Party	Candidate	Votes	%	±%

West (2)
Party	Candidate	Votes	%	±%

Woolwich (2)
Party	Candidate	Votes	%	±%
