= 1964 Kesteven County Council election =

Local election in the United Kingdom

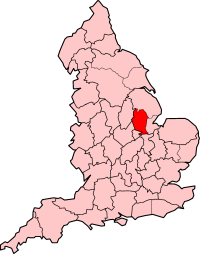
The administrative county of Kesteven (1889–1974), shown within England.

Elections to Kesteven County Council were held on Saturday, 11 April 1964. Kesteven was one of three divisions of the historic county of Lincolnshire in England; it consisted of the ancient wapentakes (or hundreds) of Aswardhurn, Aveland, Beltisloe, Boothby Graffoe, Flaxwell, Langoe, Loveden, Ness, and Winnibriggs and Threo. The Local Government Act 1888 established Kesteven as an administrative county, governed by a Council; elections were held every three years from 1889, until it was abolished by the Local Government Act 1972, which established Lincolnshire County Council in its place.

The county was divided into 60 electoral divisions, each of which returned one member. In 1964 there were contests in 5 of these.

== Results by division ==
Division	Candidate	Party	Votes	Retiring member?
Ancaster	Thomas A. H. Coltman			y
Bassingham	Tom W. Mawer			y
Bennington	Frederick Winter			y
Billingborough	Catherine A. Baker			y
Billinghay	Robert Couling			
Bourne no. 1	Eric J. Grieves			
Bourne no. 2	John R. Grummitt			y
Bracebridge	Herbert E. Hough			y
Branston	John R. Wilkinson			y
Bytham	John H. Turner			y
Caythorpe	Bernard L. Barker			y
Claypole	Brig. Frank McCallum			y
Colsterworth	Harry Timberlake			y
Corby	John Hedley Lewis			y
Cranwell	Majorie Bangay			y
Deeping St James	Gerald G. Crowson			y
Dunston	Harry M. Salter			
Gonerby and Barrowby	John E. Snell			y
Grantham no. 1	Albert E. Bellamy			y
Grantham no. 2	William Bevan			y
Grantham no. 3	John W. Harrison			y
Grantham no. 4	Kenneth H. Jennings			y
Grantham no. 5	Philip Newton			y
Grantham no. 6	Hannah Smith			
Grantham no. 7	John C. B. Thompson			
Grantham no. 8	Thomas H. Scott			
Grantham no. 9	George E. Waltham			y
Grantham no. 10	K. S. Botterill	Lab	346	
Grantham no. 10	O. P. Hudson	Con	510	y
Heckington	Joseph Q. M. Longstaff			y
Helpringham	Sydney P. King			y
Kyme	Stanley T. Wood			y
Leadenham	William Reeve			y
Market Deeping	James C. Cave			y
Martin	Henry C. Rothery			y
Metheringham	Rev. Samuel Radford (Vicar of Metheringham)	Ind	591	
Metheringham	Frederick C. Townsend	Ind	208	y
Morton	John A. Galletly			y
Navenby	Charles E. Marshall			y
North Hykeham	Mary Large			y
Osbournby	Nellie Robson			y
Ponton	Robert W. Newton			y
Rippingale	Harold Scarborough			y
Ropsley	W. L. Sykes	Ind	239	
Ropsley	W. J. W. Creesman	Ind	208	y
Ruskington	Eric A. Skinns			y
Scopwick	Horace Waudby			y
Skellingthorpe	R. C. Turner	Ind	568	y
Skellingthorpe	S. T. Buttery	Lab	288	
Sleaford no. 1	Cecil J. Barnes			y
Sleaford no. 2	Walter H. Owen			y
Sleaford no. 3	Henry C. Johnson			
Stamford no. 1	Gladys M. Boyfield			y
Stamford no. 2	Ernest D. Ireson			y
Stamford no. 3	J. M. W. Taylor	Ind	534	y
Stamford no. 3	G. C. Swanson	Lab	199	
Stamford no. 4	Emma C. Packer			
Stamford no. 5	Harold Knowles			y
Swinderby	Henry N. Nevile			y
Thurlby	George A. Griffin			y
Uffington	Colin B. Snodgrass			y
Washingborough	George E. Capps			y
Welby	Anthony H. Thorold			y
Wilsford	Harry N. Tickler			
Woolsthorpe	Horace H. Brownlow			y

Source: "Vicar unseats a retiring member", Sleaford Standard, 17 April 1964, p. 13.

== By-elections ==
=== Claypole, 1964 ===
Following Brigadier Frank McCallum's election to the aldermanic bench when the new council was formed, a casual vacancy arose in the Claypole division. Two candidates were nominated: Sybilla Mary McCallum, the brigadier's wife, and Wing Commander A. E. F. McCreary. An election was held on 25 July 1964. The results were as follows:

Candidate	Vote
Sybilla Mary McCallum	331
Wing Cmdr A. E. F. McCreary	153

Sybilla McCallum was returned with a majority of 178 (37%). The turnout was 47%.

=== Corby, 1964 ===
Following J. H. Lewis's election as an alderman when the new council was formed, a casual vacancy arose in the Corby division. Two candidates were nominated: Harold W. Bailey, of Swayfield, and C. John Pope, of Castle Bytham. Both were farmers and members of South Kesteven Rural District Council, of which both had served as chairman (Bailey twice). An election was held on 25 July 1964. The results were as follows:

Candidate	Vote
Harold W. Bailey	256
C. John Pope	188

Bailey was returned with a majority of 68 (15%). The turnout was 45%.

=== Uffington, 1965 ===
C. B. Snodgrass, who had been returned for the Uffington division in the 1964 elections, resigned due to ill health in 1965. The Rev. Peter E. Fluck, the rector of Uffington, was the only person nominated to fill this vacancy. He was duly returned unopposed as councillor for the division in July 1965.
