= 2006 Hillingdon London Borough Council election =

Local election in London, England

← 2002	4 May 2006	2010 →

All 65 seats to Hillingdon London Borough Council 33 seats needed for a majority
	First party	Second party	Third party
Party	Conservative	Labour	Liberal Democrats
Seats won	45	18	2
Seat change	▲14	▼9	▼5
Popular vote	34,482	17,914	15,013
Percentage	47.0%	24.4%	20.5%
Swing	▲5.7%	▼10.2%	▲3.2%
- Map of the results of the 2006 Hillingdon council election. Conservatives in blue, Labour in red and Liberal Democrats in yellow.
Council control before election
No overall control
Council control after election
Conservative

The 2006 Hillingdon Council election took place on 4 May 2006 to elect members of Hillingdon London Borough Council in London, England. The whole council was up for election and the Conservative Party gained control of the council after gaining 14 seats overall, 9 from Labour and 5 from the Liberal Democrats.

== Election result ==
Hillingdon local election result 2006
Party	Seats	Gains	Losses	Net gain/loss	Seats %	Votes %	Votes	+/−
Conservative	45	14	0	▲14	69.2	47.0	34,482	▲5.7
Labour	18	0	9	▼9	27.7	24.4	17,914	▼10.2
Liberal Democrats	2	0	5	▼5	3.1	20.5	15,013	▲3.2
Green	0	0	0	Steady	0.0	3.8	2,784	▲0.5
Independent	0	0	0	Steady	0.0	2.7	1,996	▲0.7
National Front	0	0	0	Steady	0.0	1.6	1,142	New

== Ward results ==
=== Barnhill ===
Barnhill (3)
Party	Candidate	Votes	%	±%
Labour	John Major	1,698	63.5	
Labour	Lindsay Bliss	1,682		
Labour	Anthony Way	1,556		
Conservative	Peggy Atthey	707	26.5	
Conservative	Nigel Barker	687		
Conservative	Arthur Preston	662		
Liberal Democrats	Stuart Gunn	267	10.0	
Liberal Democrats	Simon Rutstein	254		
Liberal Democrats	Leonard Toms	250		
Turnout			32.5	
Labour hold		Swing		
Labour hold		Swing		
Labour hold		Swing		

=== Botwell ===
Botwell (3)
Party	Candidate	Votes	%	±%
Labour	Janet Gardner	1,664	59.1	
Labour	Phoday Jarjussey	1,444		
Labour	Mohammed Khursheed	1,418		
Conservative	Kevin Stack	795	28.2	
Conservative	Michael Simons	783		
Conservative	Kashmir Singh Pahal	728		
Liberal Democrats	Hilary Leighter	358	12.7	
Liberal Democrats	Donald Reap	303		
Liberal Democrats	Andrew Tsambas	230		
Turnout			31.6	
Labour hold		Swing		
Labour hold		Swing		
Labour hold		Swing		

=== Brunel ===
Brunel (3)
Party	Candidate	Votes	%	±%
Conservative	Sandra Jenkins	1,569	51.4	
Conservative	Geoffrey Courtenay	1,528		
Conservative	Brian Stead	1,500		
Labour	Peter Ryerson	793	26.0	
Labour	John Morse	774		
Labour	Prakash Auchombit	720		
Liberal Democrats	Kim Mathen	370	12.1	
Liberal Democrats	Charles Lane	364		
Liberal Democrats	Marion Gettleson	358		
Green	Nicole Wright	322	10.5	
Turnout			32.7	
Conservative hold		Swing		
Conservative hold		Swing		
Conservative hold		Swing		

=== Cavendish ===
Cavendish (3)
Party	Candidate	Votes	%	±%
Conservative	Michael White	1,863	50.9	
Conservative	Edward Lavery	1,833		
Conservative	Kay Willmott-Denbeigh	1,782		
Liberal Democrats	Stephen Carey	1,491	40.7	
Liberal Democrats	Elaine Webb	1,455		
Liberal Democrats	Alan Graham	1,418		
Green	Catriona Corfield	158	4.3	
Labour	John Humphrey	150	4.1	
Labour	David Keys	146		
Turnout			48.9	
Conservative gain from Liberal Democrats		Swing		
Conservative gain from Liberal Democrats		Swing		
Conservative hold		Swing		

=== Charville ===
Charville (3)
Party	Candidate	Votes	%	±%
Conservative	Mary O'Connor	1,565	44.1	
Labour	Peter Curling	1,426	40.2	
Conservative	Anwar Bamber	1,376		
Labour	David Horne	1,329		
Labour	Roshan Ghei	1,320		
Conservative	Sunil Kapoor	1,256		
Liberal Democrats	Susan Milbank	556	15.7	
Liberal Democrats	Richard Pierce-Price	425		
Turnout			38.3	
Conservative gain from Labour		Swing		
Labour hold		Swing		
Conservative gain from Labour		Swing		

=== Eastcote and East Ruislip ===
Eastcote and East Ruislip (3)
Party	Candidate	Votes	%	±%
Conservative	Catherine Dann	3,125	72.0	
Conservative	Bruce Baker	3,067		
Conservative	David Payne	2,976		
Liberal Democrats	Richard Bonner	774	17.8	
Liberal Democrats	Mark Gettleson	758		
Liberal Democrats	Matilda Jackson	749		
Labour	Anne O'Shea	439	10.1	
Labour	Jill Oswell	380		
Labour	Mary Turvey	364		
Turnout			48.3	
Conservative hold		Swing		
Conservative hold		Swing		
Conservative hold		Swing		

=== Harefield ===
Harefield (2)
Party	Candidate	Votes	%	±%
Conservative	Richard Barnes	1,279	51.3	
Conservative	Henry Higgins	1,102		
National Front	Ian Costard	581	23.3	
Labour	Anthony Eginton	376	15.1	
Labour	Iain Chopping	375		
Liberal Democrats	Alison Marshall	256	10.3	
Liberal Democrats	Jeremy Asquith	218		
Turnout			41.5	
Conservative hold		Swing		
Conservative hold		Swing		

=== Heathrow Villages ===
Heathrow Villages (3)
Party	Candidate	Votes	%	±%
Labour	Santokh Singh Dhillon	928	31.1	
Labour	Anita Smart	880		
Conservative	Paul Buttivant	870	29.2	
Independent	Christine Taylor	806	27.0	
Labour	Edgar Money	802		
Independent	Geraldine Nicholson	789		
Conservative	Phillip O'Connor	784		
Conservative	Gordon Fewkes	741		
Liberal Democrats	Philip Sherwood	379	12.7	
Liberal Democrats	Carl Nielsen	221		
Liberal Democrats	Peter Dollimore	207		
Turnout			34.3	
Labour hold		Swing		
Labour hold		Swing		
Conservative gain from Labour		Swing		

=== Hillingdon East ===
Hillingdon East (3)
Party	Candidate	Votes	%	±%
Liberal Democrats	Jill Rhodes	1,303	37.4	
Conservative	Timothy Barker	1,279	36.7	
Conservative	Patricia Jackson	1,200		
Liberal Democrats	Andrew Vernazza	1,195		
Conservative	Glyndwr Merriman	1,152		
Liberal Democrats	Montague Cooke	1,135		
Labour	John Scallan	677	19.4	
Labour	Jagjit Singh	591		
Labour	Imran Khursheed	554		
Independent	Jonathan Bergdahl	222	6.4	
Turnout			37.2	
Liberal Democrats hold		Swing		
Conservative gain from Liberal Democrats		Swing		
Conservative gain from Liberal Democrats		Swing		

=== Ickenham ===
Ickenham (3)
Party	Candidate	Votes	%	±%
Conservative	Raymond Puddifoot	2,122	62.4	
Conservative	John Hensley	2,022		
Conservative	David Simmonds	1,869		
Liberal Democrats	Mary Cooke	769	22.6	
Liberal Democrats	Mary Outhwaite	750		
Liberal Democrats	Michael Healy	740		
Green	Vivian Long	512	15.0	
Turnout			47.6	
Conservative hold		Swing		
Conservative hold		Swing		
Conservative hold		Swing		

=== Manor ===
Manor (3)
Party	Candidate	Votes	%	±%
Conservative	Douglas Mills	1,951	41.7	
Conservative	Michael Markham	1,925		
Liberal Democrats	Michael Cox	1,888	40.3	
Conservative	Marcel Jolinon	1,828		
Liberal Democrats	Michael Gettleson	1,685		
Liberal Democrats	Susan Barrand	1,634		
Green	Graham Lee	497	10.6	
Labour	Paul Espley	345	7.4	
Green	Stephen Young	342		
Labour	Sabelo Rawana	302		
Green	Keith Fowler	300		
Turnout			52.1	
Conservative hold		Swing		
Conservative gain from Liberal Democrats		Swing		
Liberal Democrats hold		Swing		

=== Northwood ===
Northwood (3)
Party	Candidate	Votes	%	±%
Conservative	Richard Lewis	2,315	65.5	
Conservative	Scott Seaman-Digby	2,130		
Conservative	Ian Oakley	2,090		
Liberal Democrats	Fionuala Baker	739	20.9	
Liberal Democrats	Keith Baker	688		
Liberal Democrats	Melanie Winterbotham	585		
Independent	Alan Prue	479	13.6	
Turnout			38.5	
Conservative hold		Swing		
Conservative hold		Swing		
Conservative hold		Swing		

=== Northwood Hills ===
Northwood Hills (3)
Party	Candidate	Votes	%	±%
Conservative	David Bishop	2,122	61.8	
Conservative	Andrew Retter	1,972		
Conservative	Jonathan Bianco	1,960		
Liberal Democrats	Derek Honeygold	477	13.9	
Labour	Margaret Bartlett	445	13.0	
Labour	Alan Blundell	438		
Labour	Dorothy Blundell	437		
Liberal Democrats	Paul Beardsley	418		
Green	Helena Grossman	387	11.3	
Liberal Democrats	Alan Klein	359		
Turnout			37.4	
Conservative hold		Swing		
Conservative hold		Swing		
Conservative hold		Swing		

=== Pinkwell ===
Pinkwell (3)
Party	Candidate	Votes	%	±%
Labour	John Oswell	1,616	49.6	
Labour	Avtar Singh Sandhu	1,594		
Labour	Janet Duncan	1,575		
Conservative	Marion Howell	832	25.5	
Conservative	Richard Mills	731		
Conservative	Amarjit Singh Johal	707		
Independent	Robert Lewis	489	15.0	
Liberal Democrats	Gwendoline Almond	322	9.9	
Liberal Democrats	Ian Kitt	274		
Liberal Democrats	Thelma Tsambas	214		
Turnout			34.0	
Labour hold		Swing		
Labour hold		Swing		
Labour hold		Swing		

=== South Ruislip ===
South Ruislip (3)
Party	Candidate	Votes	%	±%
Conservative	Shirley Harper-O'Neill	1,473	37.8	
Conservative	Allan Kauffman	1,470		
Conservative	Judy Kelly	1,434		
Liberal Democrats	John Curley	1,334	34.2	
Liberal Democrats	Labhaya Chamdal	1,106		
Liberal Democrats	Anthony Little	1,052		
National Front	Peter Shaw	561	14.4	
Labour	Simon Gray	530	13.6	
Labour	Robert Nunn	484		
Labour	Shashi Mathur	466		
Turnout			42.6	
Conservative hold		Swing		
Conservative hold		Swing		
Conservative hold		Swing		

=== Townfield ===
Townfield (3)
Party	Candidate	Votes	%	±%
Labour	Linda Allen	1,503	57.9	
Labour	Robin Sansarpuri	1,379		
Labour	Norman Nunn-Price	1,358		
Conservative	Alfred Langley	743	28.6	
Conservative	Stanley Parish	657		
Conservative	Imtiaz Ahmad	637		
Liberal Democrats	Helen Austin	352	13.5	
Liberal Democrats	Paul Underwood	334		
Liberal Democrats	Margaret Jacobs	323		
Turnout			30.2	
Labour hold		Swing		
Labour hold		Swing		
Labour hold		Swing		

=== Uxbridge North ===
Uxbridge North (3)
Party	Candidate	Votes	%	±%
Conservative	Josephine Barrett	2,240	57.2	
Conservative	George Cooper	2,212		
Conservative	David Yarrow	1,982		
Labour	Margaret McDonald	597	15.3	
Labour	Peter McDonald	560		
Liberal Democrats	Margaret Wainwright	542	13.9	
Green	Bronwyn Rider	534	13.6	
Liberal Democrats	Eileen Holland	519		
Liberal Democrats	Jennifer Vernazza	517		
Turnout			39.2	
Conservative hold		Swing		
Conservative hold		Swing		
Conservative hold		Swing		

=== Uxbridge South ===
Uxbridge South (3)
Party	Candidate	Votes	%	±%
Conservative	Keith Burrows	1,689	55.6	
Conservative	Judith Cooper	1,637		
Conservative	David Routledge	1,614		
Labour	Garry Cooper	916	30.2	
Labour	Russell Rowlands	789		
Labour	Jamaluddin el-Shayyal	685		
Liberal Democrats	Andrew David	432	14.2	
Liberal Democrats	Hazel Young	391		
Liberal Democrats	Margaret Reap	357		
Turnout			32.7	
Conservative hold		Swing		
Conservative gain from Labour		Swing		
Conservative hold		Swing		

=== West Drayton ===
West Drayton (3)
Party	Candidate	Votes	%	±%
Conservative	Ann Banks	1,890	54.9	
Conservative	Michael Bull	1,835		
Conservative	Graham Horn	1,615		
Labour	Catherine Stocker	1,019	29.6	
Labour	Alfredo Pereira	951		
Labour	Michael Usher	905		
Liberal Democrats	Christine Bignold	535	15.5	
Turnout			35.3	
Conservative hold		Swing		
Conservative gain from Labour		Swing		
Conservative gain from Labour		Swing		

=== West Ruislip ===
West Ruislip (3)
Party	Candidate	Votes	%	±%
Conservative	Philip Corthorne	1,974	51.1	
Conservative	Brian Crowe	1,890		
Conservative	Solveig Stone	1,831		
Liberal Democrats	Nicholas Gibbs	1,201	31.1	
Liberal Democrats	Nicola Weisenberger	972		
Liberal Democrats	Salil Patankar	930		
Green	Vince Cowan-Bates	374	9.7	
Labour	John Campbell	316	8.2	
Labour	Sarah Clark	295		
Turnout			43.6	
Conservative hold		Swing		
Conservative hold		Swing		
Conservative hold		Swing		

=== Yeading ===
Yeading (3)
Party	Candidate	Votes	%	±%
Labour	David Allam	1,567	56.1	
Labour	Sidharath Garg	1,464		
Labour	Paul Harmsworth	1,408		
Conservative	Patricia Hunn	868	31.1	
Conservative	John Knight	752		
Conservative	Peter Czarniecki	747		
Liberal Democrats	Geoffrey Bennett	358	12.8	
Liberal Democrats	Geoffrey Jacobs	296		
Liberal Democrats	Neville Parsonage	296		
Turnout			32.1	
Labour hold		Swing		
Labour hold		Swing		
Labour hold		Swing		

=== Yiewsley ===
Yiewsley (3)
Party	Candidate	Votes	%	±%
Conservative	Elizabeth Kemp	1,211	49.8	
Conservative	Kenneth Bartram	1,193		
Conservative	Peter Kemp	1,188		
Labour	Anthony Burles	909	37.4	
Labour	Marion Way	873		
Labour	Paramjit Kaur Sethi	815		
Liberal Democrats	Mukhtar Ali	310	12.8	
Liberal Democrats	Reeta Chamdal	277		
Liberal Democrats	Saghaer Mallick	262		
Turnout			29.9	
Conservative gain from Labour		Swing		
Conservative gain from Labour		Swing		
Conservative gain from Labour		Swing		
