= 2002 Hillingdon London Borough Council election =

2002 local election in England

← 1998	2 May 2002	2006 →

all 65 council seats 33 seats needed for a majority
	First party	Second party	Third party
Party	Conservative	Labour	Liberal Democrats
Last election	34 seats	31 seats	4 seats
Seats won	31	27	7
Seat change	▼3	▼5	▲3
Popular vote	25,820	21,660	10,825
Percentage	41.3%	34.6%	17.3%
Council control before election
No Overall Control
Council control after election
No Overall Control

The 2002 Hillingdon London Borough Council election took place on 2 May 2002 to elect members of the Hillingdon London Borough Council. In this election, the number of seats was reduced by four because of boundary changes. The election resulted in no overall control by any single party.

== Election result ==
Hillingdon local election result 2002
Party	Seats	Gains	Losses	Net gain/loss	Seats %	Votes %	Votes	+/−
Conservative	31	18	21	▼2	47.7	41.3	25,820	
Labour	27	11	16	▼5	41.5	34.6	21,660	
Liberal Democrats	7	5	2	▲3	10.8	17.3	10825	
Green	0	0	0	0	0.0	3.3	2053	
Independent	0	0	0	0	0.0	2.0	1237	
BNP	0	0	0	0	0.0	1.4	867	
Socialist Alternative	0	0	0	0	0.0	0.2	114	
Total	65							

== Ward results ==
=== Barnhill ===
Barnhill (3)
Party	Candidate	Votes	%
Labour	John Major*	1,653	
Labour	Michael Usher	1,575	
Labour	Anthony Way*	1,505	
Conservative	Peggy Atthey	456	
Conservative	Arthur Preston	430	
Conservative	Kashmir Pahal	411	
Independent	Martin Russell	192	
Green	David Powell	171	
Liberal Democrats	Mukhtar Ali	163	
Liberal Democrats	Stuart Gunn	162	
Liberal Democrats	Andrew Peach	160	
Registered electors		8,141	
Turnout		2,418	29.7
Labour hold			
Labour hold			
Labour hold			

=== Botwell ===
Botwell (3)
Party	Candidate	Votes	%
Labour	Janet Gardner	1,686	
Labour	Peter Ryerson	1,587	
Labour	Phoday Jarjussey	1,543	
Conservative	Allan Ilsley	611	
Conservative	Valerie Robins	578	
Conservative	Michael Simons	553	
Liberal Democrats	Beryl Bell	283	
Liberal Democrats	Andrew Tsambas	139	
Liberal Democrats	Thelma Tsambas	128	
Registered electors		8,828	
Turnout		2,493	28.2
Labour hold			
Labour hold			
Labour win (new seat)			

=== Brunel ===
Brunel (3)
Party	Candidate	Votes	%
Conservative	Geoffrey Courtenay	1,065	
Conservative	Sandra Jenkins	1,063	
Conservative	Alfred Langley	995	
Labour	Peter Maguire	878	
Labour	Gerald O'Connell	857	
Labour	Jacob Dua	811	
Liberal Democrats	Rachael Hickman	276	
Liberal Democrats	Christopher Lowdon	247	
Liberal Democrats	Jamil El-Khalil	230	
Registered electors		8,347	
Turnout		2,239	26.8
Conservative win (new seat)			
Conservative win (new seat)			
Conservative win (new seat)			

=== Cavendish ===
Cavendish (3)
Party	Candidate	Votes	%
Liberal Democrats	Stephen Carry*	1,602	
Liberal Democrats	Elaine Webb	1,517	
Conservative	Margaret Grant	1,470	
Liberal Democrats	Anthony Little	1,457	
Conservative	Michael White	1,457	
Conservative	Joseph Brice	1,456	
Labour	Martin Hunt	421	
Labour	Alan Blundell	394	
Labour	Ian Mitchell	382	
Registered electors		8,371	
Turnout		3,512	42.0
Liberal Democrats hold			
Liberal Democrats hold			
Conservative win (new seat)			

=== Charville ===
Charville (3)
Party	Candidate	Votes	%
Labour	Peter Curling	1,391	
Labour	David Horne	1,344	
Labour	Roshan Ghel	1,297	
Conservative	Graham Horn	1,087	
Conservative	Vincent Bailey	1,082	
Conservative	Geraldine Nicholson	1,027	
BNP	Peter Shaw	301	
Liberal Democrats	Oliver Curley	244	
Liberal Democrats	Ian Kitt	203	
Green	Stuart Frame	183	
Liberal Democrats	Martin Scoones	168	
Registered electors		8,259	
Turnout		2,919	35.3
Labour hold			
Labour hold			
Labour hold			

=== Eastcote and East Ruislip ===
Eastcote and East Ruislip (3)
Party	Candidate	Votes	%
Conservative	Catherine Dann	2,408	
Conservative	Bruce Baker	2,388	
Conservative	David Payne	2,317	
Liberal Democrats	Matilda Jackson	638	
Liberal Democrats	Janet Campbell	635	
Liberal Democrats	David Marshall	631	
Labour	Dorothy Blundell	487	
Labour	Paul Carey	485	
Labour	Charles Roe	408	
Registered electors		8,914	
Turnout		3,562	40.0
Rejected ballots		12	0.3
Conservative win (new seat)			
Conservative win (new seat)			
Conservative win (new seat)			

=== Harefield ===
Harefield (2)
Party	Candidate	Votes	%
Conservative	Richard Barnes	925	
Conservative	Henry Higgins	758	
Labour	Pauline Crawley	725	
Labour	Wendy Rice-Morley	636	
BNP	Ian Edward	389	
Liberal Democrats	Fionuala Baker	185	
Liberal Democrats	Garth Underwood	148	
Registered electors		5,292	
Turnout		2,061	38.9
Rejected ballots		3	0.1
Conservative hold			
Conservative hold			

=== Heathrow Villages ===
Heathrow Villages (3)
Party	Candidate	Votes	%
Labour	Lee Griffin	1,096	
Labour	Jagjit Sidhu	943	
Labour	Edgar Money	895	
Conservative	Phillip O'Connor	716	
Conservative	Russell Shone	646	
Conservative	Ameen Rahal	606	
Independent	Dean Langley	341	
Liberal Democrats	Carl Nielsen	272	
Liberal Democrats	Gwendoline Almond	245	
Green	Anthony Cooper	211	
BNP	Francis McAllister	177	
Liberal Democrats	Raymond Oggier	169	
Registered electors		7,725	
Turnout		2,306	29.9
Rejected ballots		4	0.2
Labour win (new seat)			
Labour win (new seat)			
Labour win (new seat)			

=== Hillingdon East ===
Hillingdon East (3)
Party	Candidate	Votes	%
Liberal Democrats	Jill Rhodes	1,244	
Liberal Democrats	Andrew Vernazza	1,164	
Liberal Democrats	Patrick Filgate	1,159	
Labour	Lindsay Bliss	1,045	
Labour	Archibald Morrison	1,001	
Labour	Stuart Ouseley	969	
Conservative	Sarah Ilsley	904	
Conservative	Peter Czarniecki	833	
Conservative	Mathew Dhanoa	833	
Registered electors		8,531	
Turnout		3,192	37.4
Rejected ballots		13	0.4
Liberal Democrats gain from Labour			
Liberal Democrats gain from Labour			
Liberal Democrats win (new seat)			

=== Ickenham ===
Ickenham (3)
Party	Candidate	Votes	%
Conservative	Raymond Puddifoot	2,320	
Conservative	John Hensley	2,206	
Conservative	David Simmonds	2,159	
Liberal Democrats	Mary Outhwaite	564	
Labour	John Buckingham	558	
Liberal Democrats	Montague Cooke	500	
Labour	John Bebbington	464	
Labour	Charlotte Allam	432	
Liberal Democrats	Allan Wainwright	399	
Registered electors		7,770	
Turnout		3,309	42.6
Rejected ballots		6	0.2
Conservative hold			
Conservative hold			
Conservative hold			

=== Manor ===
Manor (3)
Party	Candidate	Votes	%
Liberal Democrats	Michael Cox	1,532	
Liberal Democrats	Michael Gettleson	1,354	
Conservative	Douglas Mills	1,329	
Liberal Democrats	Keith Baker	1,325	
Conservative	Glyn Merriman	1,212	
Conservative	David Yarrow	1,174	
Green	Graham Lee	561	
Labour	Robert Nunn	502	
Labour	Anna Lefort	461	
Labour	Sabelo Rawana	394	
Independent	John Payton	383	
Registered electors		8,236	
Turnout		3,671	44.6
Rejected ballots		4	0.1
Liberal Democrats gain from Conservative			
Liberal Democrats gain from Conservative			
Conservative win (new seat)			

=== Northwood ===
Northwood (3)
Party	Candidate	Votes	%
Conservative	Richard Lewis	1,695	
Conservative	Scott Seaman-Digby	1,581	
Conservative	Andrew Retter	1,466	
Liberal Democrats	Ian Chandler	562	
Liberal Democrats	Janet Davies	425	
Liberal Democrats	Harry Davies	406	
Labour	Sarah Clark	313	
Labour	Peter McDonald	264	
Labour	Mary Turvey	257	
Registered electors		7,998	
Turnout		2,492	31.2
Rejected ballots		8	0.3
Conservative hold			
Conservative hold			
Conservative hold			

=== Northwood Hills ===
Northwood Hills (3)
Party	Candidate	Votes	%
Conservative	David Bishop	1,573	
Conservative	Jonathan Bianco	1,509	
Conservative	Andrew Retter	1,466	
Labour	Susan Hill	496	
Labour	Doreen Dell	493	
Labour	Margaret McDonald	465	
Liberal Democrats	Richard Bonner	412	
Liberal Democrats	Alan Klein	407	
Liberal Democrats	Neville Parsonage	355	
Registered electors		8,349	
Turnout		2,536	30.4
Rejected ballots		10	0.4
Conservative hold			
Conservative hold			
Conservative hold			

=== Pinkwell ===
Pinkwell (3)
Party	Candidate	Votes	%
Labour	John Oswell	1,590	
Labour	Santokh Dhillon	1,446	
Labour	Avtar Sandhu	1,387	
Conservative	Marion Howell	474	
Conservative	Peter Robins	453	
Conservative	Adrian Pearston	452	
Green	Graham Gilbert	242	
Liberal Democrats	Valerie Heaney	237	
Liberal Democrats	Frank Ryder	224	
Liberal Democrats	Lucy-Anne Ryder	207	
Socialist Alternative	Julia Leonard	114	
Registered electors		8,560	
Turnout		2,437	28.5
Rejected ballots		7	0.3
Labour win (new seat)			
Labour win (new seat)			
Labour win (new seat)			

=== South Ruislip ===
South Ruislip (3)
Party	Candidate	Votes	%
Conservative	James O'Neill	1,251	
Conservative	Shirley Harper-O'Neill	1,197	
Conservative	Mary O'Conner	1,172	
Labour	Anne O'Shea	1,119	
Labour	John Morse	1,058	
Labour	Anthony Eginton	1,052	
Liberal Democrats	Christopher Green	316	
Liberal Democrats	Mary Cooke	256	
Liberal Democrats	Margaret Jacobs	255	
Green	Richard Hutton	213	
Registered electors		7,952	
Turnout		2,749	34.6
Rejected ballots		6	0.2
Conservative win (new seat)			
Conservative win (new seat)			
Conservative win (new seat)			

=== Townfield ===
Townfield (3)
Party	Candidate	Votes	%
Labour	Linda Allen	1,550	
Labour	Dalip Chand	1,472	
Labour	Norman Nunn-Price	1,362	
Conservative	Nigel Barker	419	
Conservative	Imtiaz Ahmad	377	
Conservative	Timothy Dier	364	
Independent	Jeanne Smith	321	
Green	Geoff Burrage	200	
Liberal Democrats	Peter Dollimore	192	
Liberal Democrats	Saghaer Mallick	113	
Liberal Democrats	Margaret Reap	108	
Registered electors		8,560	
Turnout		2,404	28.1
Rejected ballots		5	0.2
Labour hold			
Labour hold			
Labour hold			

=== Uxbridge North ===
Uxbridge North (3)
Party	Candidate	Votes	%
Conservative	Josephine Barrett	1,697	
Conservative	George Cooper	1,665	
Conservative	Michael Heywood	1,602	
Labour	John Lonsdale	616	
Labour	Karen McIntosh	602	
Labour	John Scallan	569	
Liberal Democrats	Audrey Monk	367	
Liberal Democrats	Margaret Wainright	367	
Liberal Democrats	Alan Graham	339	
Green	John Burrows	272	
Registered electors		8,660	
Turnout		2,825	32.6
Rejected ballots		7	0.2
Conservative hold			
Conservative hold			
Conservative win (new seat)			

=== Uxbridge South ===
Uxbridge South (3)
Party	Candidate	Votes	%
Conservative	Keith Burrows	1,204	
Labour	Anthony Burles	1,190	
Conservative	David Routledge	1,188	
Labour	Roderick Marshall	1,175	
Labour	James Jonas	1,169	
Conservative	Ian Oakley	1,150	
Liberal Democrats	Andrew Malyan	330	
Liberal Democrats	Eileen Holland	319	
Liberal Democrats	Keith Miller	244	
Registered electors		8,918	
Turnout		2,771	31.1
Rejected ballots		7	0.3
Conservative gain from Labour			
Labour hold			
Conservative win (new seat)			

=== West Drayton ===
West Drayton (3)
Party	Candidate	Votes	%
Labour	Janet Duncan	1,405	
Labour	Paul Harmsworth	1,312	
Conservative	Ann Banks	1,300	
Labour	Graham Tomlin	1,275	
Conservative	Michael Bull	1,265	
Conservative	Dipakkumar Patel	1,235	
Liberal Democrats	Andrew David	280	
Liberal Democrats	Jennifer Vernazza	236	
Liberal Democrats	Melanie Winterbotham	202	
Registered electors		8,801	
Turnout		3,077	35.0
Rejected ballots		11	0.4
Labour gain from Conservative			
Labour gain from Conservative			
Conservative win (new seat)			

=== West Ruislip ===
West Ruislip (3)
Party	Candidate	Votes	%
Conservative	Philip Cothorne	1,527	
Conservative	Brian Crowe	1,500	
Conservative	Solveig Stone	1,487	
Liberal Democrats	Jeremy	557	
Liberal Democrats	Leonard Toms	552	
Liberal Democrats	Derek Honeygold	527	
Labour	Shirley Thompson	428	
Labour	Rowena McNamara	417	
Labour	James Craig	415	
Registered electors		7,561	
Turnout		2,614	34.6
Rejected ballots		9	0.3
Conservative win (new seat)			
Conservative win (new seat)			
Conservative win (new seat)			

=== Yeading ===
Yeading (3)
Party	Candidate	Votes	%
Labour	David Allam	1,448	
Labour	Karnail Lakhan	1,352	
Labour	Mohammed Khursheed	1,303	
Conservative	Daren Murray	471	
Conservative	Mohammad Bamber	438	
Conservative	Kevin Stack	436	
Liberal Democrats	Geoffrey Bennett	221	
Liberal Democrats	Doreen Whitley	178	
Liberal Democrats	Donald Reap	166	
Registered electors		8,106	
Turnout		2,163	26.7
Rejected ballots		6	0.3
Labour hold			
Labour hold			
Labour hold			

=== Yiewsley ===
Yiewsley (3)
Party	Candidate	Votes	%
Labour	Catherine Stocker	1,063	
Labour	Marion Way	972	
Labour	Paramjit Sethi	960	
Conservative	Daniel Banks	918	
Conservative	Matthew Barber	856	
Conservative	Robert Benson	847	
Liberal Democrats	Graham Turner	318	
Liberal Democrats	John Rout	271	
Liberal Democrats	Hilary Leighter	258	
Registered electors		8,251	
Turnout		2,260	27.4
Rejected ballots		10	0.4
Labour hold			
Labour gain from Conservative			
Labour win (new seat)			
