= 1964 Greenwich London Borough Council election =

Greenwich council election

The 1964 Greenwich Council election took place on 7 May 1964 to elect members of Greenwich London Borough Council in London, England. The whole council was up for election and the Labour party gained control of the council.

== Background ==
These elections were the first for the newly formed borough. Previously elections had taken place in the Metropolitan Borough of Greenwich and Metropolitan Borough of Woolwich. These boroughs were joined to form the new London Borough of Greenwich by the London Government Act 1963.

A total of 140 candidates stood in the election for the 60 seats being contested across 27 wards. These included a full slate from the Labour party, while the Conservative and Liberal parties stood at 58 and 16 respectively. Other candidates included 6 from the Communist party. There were 21 two-seat wards and 6 three-seat wards.

This election had aldermen as well as directly elected councillors. Labour got 9 aldermen and the Conservatives 1.

The Council was elected in 1964 as a "shadow authority" but did not start operations until 1 April 1965.

== Election result ==
The results saw Labour gain the new council with a majority of 38 after winning 49 of the 60 seats. Overall turnout in the election was 36.0%. This turnout included 1,018 postal votes.

== Ward results ==
Abbey Wood (3)
Party	Candidate	Votes	%	±%
Labour	D. S. Ramsey	2,006		
Labour	G. E. Offord	2,005		
Labour	N. G. Burbridge	1,843		
Conservative	C. H. Dean	451		
Conservative	Mrs. F. A. Dean	440		
Conservative	R. Gibbs	427		
Communist	W. S. Spencer	220		
Turnout		2,525	28.8	
Labour win (new seat)				
Labour win (new seat)				
Labour win (new seat)				

Academy (2)
Party	Candidate	Votes	%	±%
Labour	Mrs. C. B. Jeffrey	1,372		
Labour	G. S. Dean	1,368		
Conservative	J. F. G. Benson	679		
Conservative	J. P. Paine	674		
Turnout		2,101	41.7	
Labour win (new seat)				
Labour win (new seat)				

Blackheath (2)
Party	Candidate	Votes	%	±%
Conservative	I. Davison	1,286		
Conservative	D. C. Thurley	1,246		
Labour	Mrs. G. Williams	741		
Labour	R. Blatchford	716		
Liberal	R. Rugman	357		
Liberal	R. Homes	352		
Turnout		2,390	46.1	
Conservative win (new seat)				
Conservative win (new seat)				

Charlton (2)
Party	Candidate	Votes	%	±%
Labour	T. E. Smith	898		
Labour	W. Clarke	872		
Conservative	S. G. Wayment	214		
Conservative	T. Saunders	206		
Liberal	Miss M. Ingram	167		
Liberal	Mrs. R. B. Law	150		
Turnout		1,396	28.9	
Labour win (new seat)				
Labour win (new seat)				

Coldharbour (2)
Party	Candidate	Votes	%	±%
Labour	D. J. Dean	1,532		
Labour	W. A. G. Brooks	1,530		
Conservative	Miss M. D. Cole	613		
Conservative	W. S. Manners	592		
Turnout		2,158	41.1	
Labour win (new seat)				
Labour win (new seat)				

Eastcombe (2)
Party	Candidate	Votes	%	±%
Labour	J. A. Saunders	1,214		
Labour	Mrs. K. P. Bullard	1,198		
Conservative	Miss R. Manners	568		
Conservative	K. Stevens	541		
Turnout		1,792	35.3	
Labour win (new seat)				
Labour win (new seat)				

Eltham (2)
Party	Candidate	Votes	%	±%
Conservative	Mrs. S. M. Bradley	1,579		
Conservative	F. B. Newland	1,579		
Labour	Mrs. L. M. Sheppard	880		
Labour	A. B. S. Soper	877		
Turnout		2,482	47.2	
Conservative win (new seat)				
Conservative win (new seat)				

Eynsham (2)
Party	Candidate	Votes	%	±%
Labour	L. A. Heath	1,402		
Labour	N. R. J. Sims	1,387		
Communist	R. M. Dobson	85		
Turnout		1,541	28.5	
Labour win (new seat)				
Labour win (new seat)				

Hornfair (2)
Party	Candidate	Votes	%	±%
Labour	R. D. Moyle	1,446		
Labour	R. Score	1,421		
Conservative	Mrs. S. Busby	665		
Conservative	Mrs. E. Stowell	642		
Communist	L. Attenborough	48		
Turnout		2,150	35.7	
Labour win (new seat)				
Labour win (new seat)				

Horn Park (2)
Party	Candidate	Votes	%	±%
Labour	M. A. Jeffrey	1,414		
Labour	Mrs. N. A. E. Woods	1,375		
Conservative	Mrs. E. R. M. Middleton	1,072		
Conservative	B. J. Easton	1,061		
Turnout		2,504	51.0	
Labour win (new seat)				
Labour win (new seat)				

Kidbrooke (3)
Party	Candidate	Votes	%	±%
Labour	D. A. Spurgeon	1,507		
Labour	H. A. Read	1,506		
Labour	G. Jones	1,496		
Conservative	E. Branson	572		
Conservative	Mrs. G. M. Barry	550		
Conservative	W. Kidby	544		
Liberal	R. Marsh	354		
Liberal	P. Short	340		
Liberal	R. S. Warwicker	340		
Communist	D. Brown	130		
Turnout		2,490	36.7	
Labour win (new seat)				
Labour win (new seat)				
Labour win (new seat)				

Marsh (2)
Party	Candidate	Votes	%	±%
Labour	Mrs. A. Kennedy	1,123		
Labour	Mrs. J. Chrisp	1,084		
Conservative	F. Edwards	151		
Conservative	E. Smithers	134		
Turnout		1,291	26.3	
Labour win (new seat)				
Labour win (new seat)				

Middle Park (2)
Party	Candidate	Votes	%	±%
Labour	Mrs. H. Stroud	1,316		
Labour	T. G. Blann	1,307		
Conservative	H. I. Samuel	670		
Conservative	P. T. S. Batterbury	637		
Turnout		2,023	39.2	
Labour win (new seat)				
Labour win (new seat)				

New Eltham (3)
Party	Candidate	Votes	%	±%
Conservative	Mrs. W. H. Hulbert	2,222		
Conservative	R. F. Fyson	2,210		
Conservative	L. J. Smith	2,197		
Labour	W. Hewlett	2,034		
Labour	F. J. Munns	1,985		
Labour	T. J. Welsh	1,923		
Turnout		4,241	50.4	
Conservative win (new seat)				
Conservative win (new seat)				
Conservative win (new seat)				

Park (2)
Party	Candidate	Votes	%	±%
Labour	H. Icough	1,058		
Labour	H. Coutts	1,057		
Conservative	C. Jones	380		
Conservative	T. Wykes	346		
Communist	E. Filer	70		
Turnout		1,502	27.1	
Labour win (new seat)				
Labour win (new seat)				

St George's (2)
Party	Candidate	Votes	%	±%
Labour	Mrs. P. A. Middleton	904		
Labour	Mrs. M. E. Polley	890		
Conservative	J. W. Clarke	270		
Conservative	J. C. Clarke	268		
Turnout		1,191	28.2	
Labour win (new seat)				
Labour win (new seat)				

St Margaret's (3)
Party	Candidate	Votes	%	±%
Labour	J. P. Hamilton	1,621		
Labour	J. Dey	1,613		
Labour	Mrs. A. E. Everitt	1,609		
Conservative	N. Hughes-Narborough	909		
Conservative	J. Helm	875		
Conservative	G. E. Allen	870		
Liberal	R. H. Smith	327		
Liberal	V. J. Monk	325		
Liberal	C. E. Smith	293		
Turnout		2,867	33.7	
Labour win (new seat)				
Labour win (new seat)				
Labour win (new seat)				

St Mary's (3)
Party	Candidate	Votes	%	±%
Labour	E. Williams	1,524		
Labour	W. H. E. Flood	1,489		
Labour	I. N. Smith	1,487		
Conservative	Mrs. E. M. Flury	390		
Conservative	Mrs. E. R. Sharp	372		
Conservative	Mrs. D. M. Saunders	370		
Turnout		1,937	30.1	
Labour win (new seat)				
Labour win (new seat)				
Labour win (new seat)				

St Nicholas (3)
Party	Candidate	Votes	%	±%
Labour	R. F. Neve	1,943		
Labour	H. F. Reilly	1,938		
Labour	Mrs. M. I. Kingwell	1,935		
Conservative	L. H. F. Bliss	329		
Conservative	Miss C. F. S. Bell	326		
Conservative	G. Gibbs	325		
Turnout		2,320	25.9	
Labour win (new seat)				
Labour win (new seat)				
Labour win (new seat)				

Sherard (2)
Party	Candidate	Votes	%	±%
Labour	R. T. Coombs	1,582		
Labour	T. A. J. Malone	1,540		
Conservative	A. G. Miles	319		
Conservative	Mrs. I. D. Miles	308		
Communist	Mrs. C. Clarke	80		
Turnout		1,943	38.7	
Labour win (new seat)				
Labour win (new seat)				

Shooters Hill (2)
Party	Candidate	Votes	%	±%
Conservative	C. H. Miles	1,862		
Conservative	A. M. Selves	1,827		
Labour	A. W. Bassett	979		
Labour	E. A. Chapman	972		
Liberal	J. R. Hassall	261		
Liberal	M. Newman	245		
Turnout		3,119	60.6	
Conservative win (new seat)				
Conservative win (new seat)				

Slade (2)
Party	Candidate	Votes	%	±%
Labour	Mrs. J. E. Carroll	1,057		
Labour	Mrs. D. M. Munns	1,050		
Conservative	D. W. Sinclair	279		
Conservative	R. Brian	263		
Liberal	P. S. Mercer	99		
Liberal	A. H. Hall	96		
Turnout		1,454	26.3	
Labour win (new seat)				
Labour win (new seat)				

Trafalgar (2)
Party	Candidate	Votes	%	±%
Labour	C. J. Scales	1,138		
Labour	L. Squirrell	1,114		
Conservative	Mrs. A. L. Manners	278		
Conservative	Miss M. K. Bailey	259		
Turnout		1,440	29.7	
Labour win (new seat)				
Labour win (new seat)				

Vanbrugh (2)
Party	Candidate	Votes	%	±%
Conservative	Mrs. E. Pennington	940		
Conservative	W. J. Manners	879		
Labour	V. Cook	837		
Labour	N. A. Edgerton	830		
Turnout		1,822	37.8	
Conservative win (new seat)				
Conservative win (new seat)				

Well Hall (2)
Party	Candidate	Votes	%	±%
Labour	Mrs. M. J. Bradley	1,672		
Labour	E. G. Bell	1,668		
Conservative	D. D. Poston	1,094		
Conservative	Mrs. J. M. Hoare	1,092		
Liberal	P. M. McGarry	171		
Liberal	G. A. Lamidey	167		
Turnout		2,983	53.6	
Labour win (new seat)				
Labour win (new seat)				

West (2)
Party	Candidate	Votes	%	±%
Labour	W. F. Strong	792		
Labour	W. G. Darvill	788		
Conservative	Dr. D. J. Gibson	138		
Conservative	H. Hook	124		
Turnout		949	19.8	
Labour win (new seat)				
Labour win (new seat)				

Woolwich (2)
Party	Candidate	Votes	%	±%
Labour	P. G. Mornington	1,176		
Labour	Mrs. E. Mansell	1,160		
Conservative	Mrs. V. A. Allen	141		
Conservative	G. E. Sharpe	140		
Turnout		1,341	25.5	
Labour win (new seat)				
Labour win (new seat)				
