= Frank McCallum (Indian Army officer) =

Brigadier Frank McCallum, CIE, OBE, MC, DL (11 March 1900 – 14 July 1983) was a British Indian Army officer, landowner and local politician of Scottish descent.

== Early life ==
Frank McCallum was born on 11 March 1900, the son of Lieutenant-Colonel Donald McCallum, of Edinburgh, an officer in the Royal Army Service Corps. He was educated at George Watson's College, before entering the Royal Military College. In 1932, he married Sybilla Mary de Symons, OBE. She was a daughter of General Sir George Barrow, GCB, KCMG, and they had two sons, one of whom died before his father. In 1961, their son George de Symons McCallum married Jennifer Cleland, daughter of Kenneth Cleland, of Bedford Park, London.

== Career ==
=== Indian Army ===
McCallum was commissioned into the British Army as an unattached second lieutenant on 20 December 1918; he was commissioned into the British Indian Army at the same rank on 31 March 1919, and was promoted to lieutenant that December. The same year, McCallum served in the Third Afghan War, and subsequently in the North-West Frontier (1920–21, 1923, 1936 and 1937–39). Promotion to captain on 20 December 1924 was followed by an appointment as aide-de-camp to the General Officer Commanding-in-Chief of the Eastern Command, India (October 1927 to March 1928). Between 1934 and 1935, he was stationed at the Staff College in Quetta, before being promoted to major in December 1936 and serving as a staff captain (February 1937 and December 1937) and a Brigade Major (December 1937 and December 1939).

McCallum was a general staff officer in the Meerut District from 1940 to 1941, before serving in Iraq, Persia and Syria over the course of World War II and in 1946. In the meantime, he was a general staff officer with the 8th Indian Division between 1941 and 1943 and, following promotion to brigadier in 1943, he commanded a brigade until 1946. From then until the following year, he was brigadier general staff in the Northern Command at India and in 1947 served as director of staff duties at the Army Headquarters in Pakistan.

=== Local politics and later life ===
After retiring from the armed forces in May 1948, McCallum became involved in local politics. He was Assistant Regional Food Officer for the North Midlands between then and 1951, before serving as Regional Secretary for the Country Landowners Association until 1965. He was elected a County Councillor for Kesteven in 1952 and was elevated to the aldermanic bench in 1964, serving until the Council's dissolution in 1974. In 1965, he was appointed Deputy Lieutenant of Lincolnshire.

For his service in the North-West Frontier, McCallum received the Military Cross (1923) and was appointed an Officer of the Order of the British Empire (1936); he was appointed a Commander of the Order of the Indian Empire in 1947. McCallum died on 14 July 1983.

== Archives ==
- British Library, Asian and African Studies Department (Mss Eur D1114): papers of Brig. Frank McCallum (1900–1983), 9th Gurkha Rifles, 1918–48; of his father-in-law General Sir George de Symons Barrow (1864–1959), Indian Army, 1886–1929; and of Sybilla, Lady Barrow.
