= 1964 Hillingdon London Borough Council election =

7 May 1964	1968 →
	First party	Second party
Party	Labour	Conservative
Seats won	36	24

The 1964 Hillingdon Council election took place on 7 May 1964 to elect members of Hillingdon London Borough Council in London, England. The whole council was up for election and the Labour party gained control of the council.

== Background ==
The Municipal Borough of Uxbridge, Hayes and Harlington Urban District, Ruislip-Northwood Urban District, and Yiewsley and West Drayton Urban District were combined to form the Borough of Hillingdon by the London Government Act 1963. Thus, these 1964 elections were the first council elections in the borough.

A total of 162 candidates stood in the election for the 60 seats being contested across 18 wards. These included a full slate from the Conservative and Labour parties, while the Liberals stood 33 candidates. Other candidates included 5 Independents and 4 Communists. There were 10 three-seat wards, 7 four-seat wards and 1 two-seat ward.

This election had aldermen as well as directly elected councillors. Labour got 7 aldermen and the Conservatives 3.

The Council was elected in 1964 as a "shadow authority" but did not start operations until 1 April 1965.

== Election result ==
The results saw Labour gain the new council by a majority of 12 after winning 36 of the 60 seats. Overall turnout in the election was 43.4%: 66,115 out of the 152,464 registered electors in Hillingdon London Borough voted. This turnout included 769 postal votes.

1964 Hillingdon Council Election
Party	Seats	Gains	Losses	Net gain/loss	Seats %	Votes %	Votes	+/−
Labour	36	N/A	N/A	N/A	60.0		106,253	N/A
Conservative	24	N/A	N/A	N/A	40.0			N/A
Liberal	0	N/A	N/A	N/A	0.0			N/A
Communist	0	N/A	N/A	N/A	0.0			N/A
Independent	0	N/A	N/A	N/A	0.0			N/A
Total	60							

== Ward results ==
In these ward results, voting percentages are expressed as proportions of the total number of registered electors.

=== Belmore ===
Belmore (4)
Party	Candidate	Votes	%	±%
Labour	Mrs. E. E. Broughton	2,204	23.6	
Labour	I. Anthony	2,154	23.1	
Labour	E. K. Harding	2,121	22.7	
Labour	S. Gelburg	2,108	22.6	
Conservative	K. Fox	1,067	11.4	
Conservative	P. H. King	1,022	11.0	
Conservative	H. Singer	981	10.5	
Conservative	M. Long	979	10.5	
Liberal	G. Knight	300	3.2	
Liberal	F. Stanner	269	2.9	
Communist	E. G. Brooks	164	1.8	
Turnout		3,462	37.1	
Registered electors		9,329		
Labour win (new seat)				
Labour win (new seat)				
Labour win (new seat)				
Labour win (new seat)				

=== Colham-Cowley ===
Colham-Cowley (3)
Party	Candidate	Votes	%	±%
Labour	L. J. Davies	1,766	23.4	
Labour	K. Drury	1,765	23.4	
Labour	L. Sherman	1,721	22.9	
Conservative	Mrs. E. A. Cunningham	1,374	18.3	
Conservative	S. Thear	1,367	18.2	
Conservative	R. G. Harding	1,355	18.0	
Turnout		3,183	42.3	
Registered electors		7,518		
Labour win (new seat)				
Labour win (new seat)				
Labour win (new seat)				

=== Eastcote ===
Eastcote (3)
Party	Candidate	Votes	%	±%
Conservative	L. J. Lally	2,601	20.8	
Conservative	Miss B. A. Double	2,515	20.1	
Conservative	G. A. L. Sullivan	2,462	19.7	
Labour	E. P. Wohlfarth	1,153	9.2	
Labour	S. R. Taylor	1,148	9.1	
Labour	V. C. Brown	1,104	8.9	
Liberal	Mrs. A. M. Hayter	530	4.2	
Liberal	G. Thomas	514	4.1	
Liberal	E. G. Aldrich	495	3.9	
Turnout		4,198	50.0	
Registered electors		8,389		
Conservative win (new seat)				
Conservative win (new seat)				
Conservative win (new seat)				

=== Frogmore ===
Frogmore (4)
Party	Candidate	Votes	%	±%
Labour	Mrs. V. Chalk	2,641	17.5	
Labour	K. A. Gigg	2,632	17.4	
Labour	E. J. Vance	2,609	17.3	
Labour	E. Shaw	2,567	17	
Conservative	F. Murray	1,163	7.7	
Conservative	Mrs. I. L. Murray	1,130	7.5	
Conservative	Mrs. J. Tyrell	1,125	7.4	
Conservative	L. F. Redding	1,105	7.3	
Communist	P. R. Pink	119	0.8	
Turnout		3,877	37.7	
Registered electors		10,273		
Labour win (new seat)				
Labour win (new seat)				
Labour win (new seat)				
Labour win (new seat)				

=== Harefield ===
Harefield (2)
Party	Candidate	Votes	%	±%
Labour	G. E. Preston	1,408	35.5	
Labour	J. W. Willis	1,284	32.3	
Conservative	R. P. Green	646	16.3	
Conservative	Mrs. V. Hardey	632	15.9	
Turnout		2,060	49.6	
Registered electors		4,153		
Labour win (new seat)				
Labour win (new seat)				

=== Haydon ===
Haydon (3)
Party	Candidate	Votes	%	±%
Conservative	S. A. H. King	2,227	21.4	
Conservative	Dr. C. H. Nemeth	2,206	21.2	
Conservative	W. D. Charles	2,199	21.1	
Labour	R. E. Burt	911	8.7	
Labour	A. T. Blundell	896	8.6	
Labour	L. R. C. Bennett	889	8.5	
Liberal	D. J. Honeygold	383	3.7	
Liberal	Mrs. M. G. Owen	382	3.7	
Liberal	N. Heasman	322	3.1	
Turnout		3,520	49.5	
Registered electors		7,107		
Conservative win (new seat)				
Conservative win (new seat)				
Conservative win (new seat)				

=== Hayes ===
Hayes (4)
Party	Candidate	Votes	%	±%
Labour	R. J. Came	2,403	17.2	
Labour	G. A. Childs	2,390	17.1	
Labour	A. J. C. Beck	2,373	17	
Labour	O. Garvin	2,330	16.7	
Conservative	E. Constance	1,119	8	
Conservative	E. Stanmore	1,078	7.8	
Conservative	K. E. Salisbury	1,074	7.7	
Conservative	R. S. Treloar	1,070	7.7	
Communist	Mrs. J. Miller	148	1	
Turnout		3,659	35.9	
Registered electors		10,187		
Labour win (new seat)				
Labour win (new seat)				
Labour win (new seat)				
Labour win (new seat)				

=== Hillingdon East ===
Hillingdon East (3)
Party	Candidate	Votes	%	±%
Labour	J. Coleman	2,023	23.7	
Labour	T. J. Parker	1,997	23.3	
Labour	C. J. Gadsden	1,956	22.9	
Conservative	J. V. Mortimer	799	9.3	
Conservative	R. P. Nattress	775	9.1	
Conservative	M. C. Charteris	761	8.9	
Liberal	L. Ricketts	247	2.9	
Turnout		2,935	40.4	
Registered electors		7,264		
Labour win (new seat)				
Labour win (new seat)				
Labour win (new seat)				

=== Hillingdon West ===
Hillingdon West (3)
Party	Candidate	Votes	%	±%
Conservative	Nichols-Pratt	1,875	18.1	
Conservative	J. H. Wells	1,841	17.75	
Conservative	Mrs. L. E. Wane	1,839	17.7	
Labour	D. B. Samuels	1,505	14.5	
Labour	F. Sutcliffe	1,439	13.9	
Labour	A. J. Ball	1,399	13.5	
Liberal	R. Saunders	472	4.5	
Turnout		3,544	43.8	
Registered electors		8,087		
Conservative win (new seat)				
Conservative win (new seat)				
Conservative win (new seat)				

=== Ickenham ===
Ickenham (3)
Party	Candidate	Votes	%	±%
Conservative	E. L. Ing	2,517	25.3	
Conservative	S. L. Meggeson	2,507	25.2	
Conservative	E. C. Wood	2,472	24.8	
Labour	W. Dundan	819	8.2	
Labour	T. L. Morgan	813	8.2	
Labour	P. L. N. Smith	812	8.2	
Turnout		3,358	49.0	
Registered electors		6,847		
Conservative win (new seat)				
Conservative win (new seat)				
Conservative win (new seat)				

=== Manor ===
Manor (3)
Party	Candidate	Votes	%	±%
Conservative	N. H. Butler	1,976	14.3	
Conservative	E. Hales	1,959	14.2	
Conservative	K. I. D. Double	1,957	14.2	
Labour	F. H. Rapley	1,844	13.4	
Labour	F. A. Cooper	1,760	12.7	
Labour	D. L. Cave	1,735	12.6	
Liberal	G. Reakes	864	6.3	
Liberal	A. J. C. Tett	854	6.2	
Liberal	E. K. Olliffe	846	6.1	
Turnout		4,698	59.4	
Registered electors		7,906		
Conservative win (new seat)				
Conservative win (new seat)				
Conservative win (new seat)				

=== Northwood ===
Northwood (3)
Party	Candidate	Votes	%	±%
Conservative	D. C. Lorkin	2,608	25.3	
Conservative	C. G. Rogers	2,592	25.2	
Conservative	H. Van Gruisen	2,591	25.1	
Labour	Mrs. D. J. Blundell	454	4.4	
Labour	Mrs. M. M. Bartlett	449	4.4	
Labour	P. J. E. Dawson	444	4.3	
Liberal	G. D. Leigh	405	3.9	
Liberal	C. A. Herring	381	3.7	
Liberal	G. Jones	379	3.7	
Turnout		3,461	47.6	
Registered electors		7,278		
Conservative win (new seat)				
Conservative win (new seat)				
Conservative win (new seat)				

=== Ruislip ===
Ruislip (3)
Party	Candidate	Votes	%	±%
Conservative	E. A. Daniell	2,700	23	
Conservative	P. P. Beaty	2,685	22.9	
Conservative	C. A. Smith	2,586	22	
Liberal	S. H. Davidson	749	6.4	
Liberal	H. J. Evans	641	5.5	
Liberal	G. Krasher	626	5.3	
Labour	Mrs. D. M. Browne	601	5.1	
Labour	Mrs. P. M. Ingerson	578	4.9	
Labour	Mrs. G. B. Hobson	570	4.8	
Turnout		3,957	53.2	
Registered electors		7,439		
Conservative win (new seat)				
Conservative win (new seat)				
Conservative win (new seat)				

=== South ===
South (4)
Party	Candidate	Votes	%	±%
Labour	D. P. Flory	2,573	15.3	
Labour	J. H. C. Key	2,551	15.1	
Labour	Mrs. K. Johnson	2,544	15.1	
Labour	M. C. Wheeler	2,501	14.9	
Conservative	G. Corran	1,451	8.6	
Conservative	M. Waplington	1,376	8.2	
Conservative	C. Rackstraw	1,368	8.1	
Conservative	A. J. Tyrell	1,351	8	
Liberal	R. Hayter	346	2	
Liberal	A. Williams	334	2	
Liberal	R. Bowditch	307	1.8	
Independent	C. Smith	126	0.7	
Turnout		4,336	38.5	
Registered electors		11,260		
Labour win (new seat)				
Labour win (new seat)				
Labour win (new seat)				
Labour win (new seat)				

=== South Ruislip ===
South Ruislip (4)
Party	Candidate	Votes	%	±%
Labour	A. J. Beasley	2,803	15.5	
Labour	J. G. Bartlett	2,794	15.4	
Labour	N. A. Mulliner	2,716	15	
Labour	P. L. Ingerson	2,714	15	
Conservative	J. Johnson	1,351	7.5	
Conservative	H. E. Rose	1,295	7.2	
Conservative	Mrs. D. G. Surman	1,284	7.1	
Conservative	C. G. French	1,278	7.1	
Liberal	Mrs. M. Avery	539	3	
Liberal	T. C. Bean	459	2.5	
Liberal	A. R. Davis	426	2.3	
Liberal	G. R. Macinnes	423	2.3	
Turnout		4,610	42.6	
Registered electors		10,826		
Labour win (new seat)				
Labour win (new seat)				
Labour win (new seat)				
Labour win (new seat)				

=== Uxbridge ===
Uxbridge (3)
Party	Candidate	Votes	%	±%
Conservative	Mrs. B. M. Thorndike	1,405	13.2	
Conservative	P. Blow	1,384	13	
Conservative	R. S. B. Shepard	1,293	12.2	
Labour	Mrs. Pomeroy	1,277	12	
Labour	K. Marlow	1,198	11.3	
Labour	B. Simpson	1,153	10.9	
Independent	T. Barnard	865	8.1	
Independent	A. Streets	640	6	
Independent	P. Flower	625	5.9	
Liberal	J. B. Leno	276	2.6	
Liberal	B. Outhwaite	215	2	
Liberal	A. Wilmot	174	1.6	
Communist	J. J. Thompson	98	0.9	
Turnout		3,638	44.7	
Registered electors		8,130		
Conservative win (new seat)				
Conservative win (new seat)				
Conservative win (new seat)				

=== Yeading ===
Yeading (4)
Party	Candidate	Votes	%	±%
Labour	S. G. Chilton	2,097	18.8	
Labour	J. Nosworthy	2,079	13.4	
Labour	C. Somers	2,079	13.4	
Labour	J. E. Walters	2,064	13.4	
Conservative	B. Everley	1,133	7.3	
Conservative	D. Clarke	1,119	7.2	
Conservative	D. Gage	1,107	7.2	
Conservative	D. Milnes	1,087	7	
Liberal	P. Dudman	476	3.1	
Liberal	A. Reade	471	3	
Liberal	J. Duffin	468	3	
Liberal	I. Flatman	456	2.9	
Turnout		3,722	37.2	
Registered electors		10,011		
Labour win (new seat)				
Labour win (new seat)				
Labour win (new seat)				
Labour win (new seat)				

=== Yiewsley ===
Yiewsley (4)
Party	Candidate	Votes	%	±%
Labour	R. Perry	2,356	15.6	
Labour	T. Cluny	2,353	15.6	
Labour	Mrs. Egleton	2,317	15.3	
Labour	J. Rowe	2,309	15.3	
Conservative	M. Foote	1,413	9.3	
Conservative	A. C. Maynard	1,377	9.1	
Conservative	J. E. H. Wilkins	1,361	9	
Conservative	Mrs. Fielding-Goode	1,335	8.8	
Independent	L. Knott	289	1.9	
Turnout		3,897	37.3	
Registered electors		10,460		
Labour win (new seat)				
Labour win (new seat)				
Labour win (new seat)				
Labour win (new seat)				
