= 2026 Greenwich London Borough Council election =

2026 English local government election

- 7 May 2026

All 55 seats to Greenwich London Borough Council 28 seats needed for a majority
- Turnout: 81,331; 41.8%

	First party	Second party
Leader	Anthony Okereke	Tamasin Rhymes
Party	Labour	Green
Last election	52 seats, 57.9%	0 seats, 12.0%
Seats before	47	2
Seats won	35	13
Seat change	▼17	▲13
Popular vote	63,743	52,502
Percentage	32.6%	26.9%
Swing	▼25.3pp	▲14.9pp
	Third party	Fourth party
Leader	Matt Hartley
Party	Conservative	Reform
Last election	3 seats, 23.1%	0 seats, 0.5%
Seats before	4	0
Seats won	6	1
Seat change	▲3	▲1
Popular vote	30,322	34,499
Percentage	15.5%	17.6%
Swing	▼7.6pp	▲17.1pp
- Map of the results of the 2026 Greenwich London Borough Council election. Conservatives in blue, Labour in red and Greens in green. Striped wards have mixed representation.
Leader before election
Anthony Okereke
Labour
Leader after election
Anthony Okereke
Labour

The 2026 Greenwich London Borough Council election took place on 7 May 2026, as part of the 2026 United Kingdom local elections. All 55 members of Greenwich London Borough Council were elected. The election took place alongside local elections in the other London boroughs.

Prior to the election, the council was under Labour majority control. The election saw Labour lose seats, notably to the Green Party, but Labour retained a majority of the council's seats.

== Background ==
=== History ===
Result of the 2022 election

The thirty-two London boroughs were established in 1965 by the London Government Act 1963. They are the principal authorities in Greater London and have responsibilities including education, housing, planning, highways, social services, libraries, recreation, waste, environmental health and revenue collection. Some of the powers are shared with the Greater London Authority, which also manages passenger transport, police and fire.

Since its formation, Greenwich has been continuously under Labour control except for the period from 1968 to 1971 when it was under Conservative control. In the most recent election in 2022, Labour won 52 seats with 57.9% of the vote and the Conservatives won 3 seats with 23.1% of the vote. The Green Party received 12.0% of the vote and the Liberal Democrats received 6.1% of the vote, but neither party won any seats. The incumbent leader of the council is the Labour councillor Anthony Okereke, who has held that position since May 2022.

=== Council term ===
Labour lost three council seats during the council term since the 2022 election: losing the October 2024 Eltham Town and Avery Hill by-election to the Conservatives, councillor Majella Anning leaving the party in March 2025 to sit as an independent, and losing the June 2025 Shooters Hill by-election to the Green Party.

== Electoral process ==
Greenwich, as is the case with all other London borough councils, elects all of its councillors at once every four years, with the previous election having taken place in 2022. The election takes place by multi-member first-past-the-post voting, with each ward being represented by two or three councillors. Electors will have as many votes as there are councillors to be elected in their ward, with the top two or three being elected.

All registered electors (British, Irish, Commonwealth and European Union citizens) living in London aged 18 or over are entitled to vote in the election. People who live at two addresses in different councils, such as university students with different term-time and holiday addresses, are entitled to be registered for and vote in elections in both local authorities. Voting in-person at polling stations takes place from 7:00 to 22:00 on election day, and voters are able to apply for postal votes or proxy votes in advance of the election.

== Previous council composition ==
State of the council before the 2026 election

After 2022 election		Before 2026 election		After 2026 election	
Party	Seats	Party	Seats	Party	Seats
Labour	52	Labour	47	Labour	35
Conservative	3	Conservative	4	Green	13
		Green	2	Conservative	6
		Independent	2	Reform	1

== Result summary ==
Council composition after the 2022 election

Council composition after the 2026 election

2026 Greenwich London Borough Council election
Party	Seats	Gains	Losses	Net gain/loss	Seats %	Votes %	Votes	+/−
Labour	35	0	17	▼17	63.6%	32.6%	63,743	▼25.3pp
Green	13	13	0	▲13	23.6%	26.9%	52,502	▲14.9pp
Conservative	6	3	0	▲3	10.9%	15.5%	30,322	▼7.6pp
Reform	1	1	0	▲1	1.8%	17.6%	34,499	▲17.1pp
Liberal Democrats	0	0	0	Steady	0.0%	6.1%	12,019	Steady
Independent	0	0	0	Steady	0.0%	0.6%	1,216	▲0.5pp
Your Party	0	0	0	Steady	0.0%	0.5%	1,064	New
Monster Raving Loony	0	0	0	Steady	0.0%	0.1%	121	Steady
Total	55						195,486	

== Ward results ==
=== Abbey Wood ===
Abbey Wood (3 seats)
Party	Candidate	Votes	%	±%
Labour	Tom Creswell	1,538	36.2	
Labour	Jummy Dawodu	1,410	33.2	
Labour	Gaumaya Gurung Ranabhat	1,292	30.4	
Green	Annabel Beales	1,273	30.0	
Green	Ben Preston	1,083	25.5	
Reform	Ruth Handyside	968	22.8	
Reform	Austin Powers	937	22.0	
Reform	Gregory Rodwell	910	21.4	
Independent	Ann-Marie Imani Cousins	783	18.4	
Conservative	Grace Aydin	407	9.6	
Conservative	Simon Gallie	357	8.4	
Conservative	Angela Skabrin	273	6.4	
Liberal Democrats	Finbarr Dominic Headon	202	4.8	
Independent	Ronie Devere Johnson	177	4.2	
Liberal Democrats	Thomas Headon	166	3.9	
Liberal Democrats	Simon Robinson	140	3.3	
Turnout		4250	37.0	+9%
Labour hold		Swing		
Labour hold		Swing		
Labour hold		Swing		

=== Blackheath Westcombe ===
Blackheath Westcombe (3 seats)
Party	Candidate	Votes	%	±%
Labour	Mariam Lolovar	1,848		
Labour	Leo Sean Fletcher	1,844		
Labour	Christine St.Matthew-Daniel	1,715		
Green	Jasmine Haga	1,557		
Conservative	Geoff Brighty	1,510		
Green	Fiona Moore	1,502		
Green	Meena Thiagaraj	1,400		
Conservative	Tim Waters	1,132		
Conservative	Mary Pfeiffer	1,130		
Liberal Democrats	Sian Walsh	652		
Liberal Democrats	Ray Kay	647		
Liberal Democrats	Deramore Hutchcroft	642		
Reform	Robert Kennedy	627		
Reform	Vlad Lavtrientev	519		
Reform	Topo Wresniwiro	489		
Monster Raving Loony	Trevor William Allman	121		
Turnout		5,901	53.8	+7.4%
Labour hold		Swing		
Labour hold		Swing		
Labour hold		Swing		

=== Charlton Hornfair ===
Charlton Hornfair (2 seats)
Party	Candidate	Votes	%	±%
Green	Jessica Holland	1,289		
Labour	Bren Albiston	1,207		
Green	Lakshan Saldin	1,189		
Labour	Ambreen Hisbani	1,022		
Reform	Philip Mark Dunn	587		
Reform	Ann Teresa Kelly	558		
Conservative	Rupert Fiennes	340		
Conservative	Frederick Waters	293		
Liberal Democrats	Sam Burridge	258		
Liberal Democrats	Stuart Watkin	189		
Turnout		3,549	44.7	+10.2
Green gain from Labour		Swing		
Labour hold		Swing		

=== Charlton Village and Riverside ===
Charlton Village and Riverside (2 seats)
Party	Candidate	Votes	%	±%
Labour	David Gardner	1,174		
Labour	Jo van den Broek	1,065		
Green	Andrew Cowley	978		
Green	Gary Dark	912		
Reform	Stephen Briley	434		
Reform	Caroline Everett	422		
Conservative	Ivan Jinaru	214		
Liberal Democrats	Geoff Horrell	180		
Conservative	Sandeep Kunchamwar	175		
Liberal Democrats	Tim Jeffery	163		
Turnout		2,933	42.4	+9.2
Labour hold		Swing		
Labour hold		Swing		

=== East Greenwich ===
East Greenwich (3 seats)
Party	Candidate	Votes	%	±%
Green	Jo Land	1,927		
Green	George Edgar	1,899		
Green	Patrick Ives	1,845		
Labour	Maisie Cottell	1,437		
Labour	Erik Cummins	1,341		
Labour	Majid Rahman	1,267		
Reform	Charlie Kelly	523		
Reform	Darren Ward	506		
Reform	Martin Markov	492		
Conservative	Oliver Bingham	434		
Conservative	David Brinson	406		
Conservative	Brian Weller	340		
Liberal Democrats	James Jefford	298		
Liberal Democrats	Josh Rogers	252		
Liberal Democrats	Kieran Watkins	246		
Turnout		4,523	43.4	+3.8
Green gain from Labour		Swing		
Green gain from Labour		Swing		
Green gain from Labour		Swing		

=== Eltham Page ===
Eltham Page (2 seats)
Party	Candidate	Votes	%	±%
Reform	Paul Banks	940		
Labour	Jane Dickenson	912		
Labour	Chris May	797		
Reform	Siama Qadar	790		
Green	Colin James	465		
Green	Robert Ramcharan	400		
Conservative	Spencer Drury	380		
Conservative	Phil Russell	303		
Liberal Democrats	Alistair Mills	124		
Liberal Democrats	Elliot Shubert	98		
Turnout		5209	40.5	+8.9
Reform gain from Labour		Swing		
Labour hold		Swing		

=== Eltham Park and Progress ===
Eltham Park and Progress (2 seats)
Party	Candidate	Votes	%	±%
Labour	Jeremy Fraser	1,317		
Labour	Gabriella Olumide	1,263		
Reform	Christian Achilli	1106		
Reform	Scarlett Kelsey	1064		
Conservative	Ben Crompton	974		
Conservative	Anthonia Adolphus-Ugo	882		
Green	Arthur Drury	862		
Green	Sophie McGinness	782		
Liberal Democrats	Kieran Edwards	249		
Liberal Democrats	Jason Riddell	218		
Independent	Earl Williamson	42		

=== Eltham Town and Avery Hill ===
Eltham Town and Avery Hill (3 seats)
Party	Candidate	Votes	%	±%
Conservative	Charlie Davis	2,006		
Conservative	Pat Greenwell	1,893		
Conservative	Rob Sayers	1,623		
Reform	Helen Banks	1393		
Reform	Daniel Cozer	1271		
Labour	Johnathan Akindutire	1257		
Labour	Eleanor Haddock	1249		
Reform	Azmi Besim	1170		
Labour	Frederick Sullivan-Wallace	1086		
Green	Michael Pickup	763		
Green	Matt Stratford	744		
Green	Mark Williams	670		
Liberal Democrats	Eileen Cox	266		
Liberal Democrats	Michael Chuter	234		
Liberal Democrats	Mark Pattenden	222		
Independent	Arnold Tarling	157		

=== Greenwich Creekside ===
Greenwich Creekside (2 seats)
Party	Candidate	Votes	%	±%
Labour	Tillie Muir	1,289		
Labour	Calum O'Byrne Mulligan	1,265		
Green	Keira Randall	1147		
Liberal Democrats	Anthony Austin	533		
Liberal Democrats	Andrew Harrison	305		
Conservative	Christopher Swift	278		
Reform	Anthonio Mandika	233		
Conservative	Rajinder Tamber	190		
Reform	Scott Bailey	91		

=== Greenwich Park ===
Greenwich Park (2 seats)
Party	Candidate	Votes	%	±%
Green	Stacy Smith	1,514		
Green	Karin Tearle	1,330		
Labour	Jen Davis	1238		
Labour	Aidan Smith	1191		
Reform	James Reynolds	358		
Conservative	Andrew Bell	344		
Reform	Keith Scholefield	338		
Conservative	Alistair Green	329		
Liberal Democrats	Victoria Harris	305		
Liberal Democrats	Andrew Smith	221		

=== Greenwich Peninsula ===
Greenwich Peninsula (3 seats)
Party	Candidate	Votes	%	±%
Green	Austin McGrath	982		
Green	Claire Selby	955		
Labour	Denise Scott-McDonald	924		
Green	Kit Tinkler	861		
Labour	Rob Stebbings	793		
Labour	Nick Williams	790		
Conservative	Jennifer Roberts	397		
Conservative	Michael Hoskin	392		
Conservative	Martin Seiffarth	337		
Reform	Anna Farra	326		
Liberal Democrats	Richard Chamberlain	309		
Reform	Alan Williams	301		
Reform	Catalin Protea	288		
Liberal Democrats	Jack Sellick	267		
Liberal Democrats	Tim West	243		

=== Kidbrooke Park ===
Kidbrooke Park (2 seats)
Party	Candidate	Votes	%	±%
Labour	John Fahy	1,076		
Labour	Nikki Thurlow	951		
Reform	Don Austen	726		
Green	Veronica Judge	681		
Reform	Terence Pratt	681		
Green	Natacha Kennedy	622		
Conservative	Malcolm Reid	396		
Conservative	Carina Watney	381		
Liberal Democrats	Alison Kakoschke	209		
Liberal Democrats	Donald Reid	157		

=== Kidbrooke Village and Sutcliffe ===
Kidbrooke Village and Sutcliffe (2 seats)
Party	Candidate	Votes	%	±%
Labour	Sandra Bauer	710		
Labour	Lewis Hurst	640		
Green	Richard Graham	586		
Green	Alison McCants	580		
Reform	Alan Alison	277		
Reform	Lil Hubbard	254		
Conservative	Kate Drury	243		
Conservative	Purabi Ghosh	184		
Liberal Democrats	Chris Ashworth	152		
Liberal Democrats	Chris Milne	110		

=== Middle Park and Horn Park ===
Middle Park and Horn Park (2 seats)
Party	Candidate	Votes	%	±%
Labour	Olu Babatola	946		
Labour	Rachel Taggart-Ryan	908		
Reform	Nicola Meaney	780		
Reform	Adriana Cozer	751		
Green	Ibrahim Balogun	462		
Green	Anji Petersen	439		
Conservative	Mandy Brinkhurst	334		
Conservative	Matthew Brooker	313		
Liberal Democrats	Chris Smith	138		
Liberal Democrats	Roger Spence	101		

=== Mottingham, Coldharbour and New Eltham ===
Mottingham, Coldharbour and New Eltham (3 seats)
Party	Candidate	Votes	%	±%
Conservative	Matt Hartley	1,903		
Conservative	Roger Tester	1,833		
Conservative	Luke Warren	1,696		
Reform	Tom Bright	1228		
Reform	Charles Case	1178		
Labour	Tom Fielder	1091		
Reform	Clara Rapley	1074		
Labour	Angela Josiah	1042		
Labour	Curtis Rulton	900		
Green	Judy Delap	643		
Green	Alex Pemberton	601		
Green	Victoria Rance	594		
Liberal Democrats	Paul Gentry	172		
Liberal Democrats	Judy Spence	156		

=== Plumstead and Glyndon ===
Plumstead and Glyndon (3 seats)
Party	Candidate	Votes	%	±%
Labour	Tammy Adhego	1,759		
Labour	Jit Ranhabat	1,610		
Labour	Adel Khaireh	1,591		
Green	Emma Dalmayne	1272		
Green	Victoria Ford	1180		
Green	Duncan Platt	988		
Your Party	Narendra Kandel	720		
Reform	Matthew Beales	677		
Reform	Michael Kelly	610		
Reform	Len Heffer	598		
Conservative	Christopher Anoty	428		
Conservative	Doinita Avram	350		
Conservative	Obidike Chukwuma	349		
Liberal Democrats	Andrew Young	265		
Liberal Democrats	Peter Phebey	211		

=== Plumstead Common ===
Plumstead Common (3 seats)
Party	Candidate	Votes	%	±%
Green	Leonie Barron	1,684		
Green	Stewart Christie	1,491		
Green	David Monteith	1,477		
Labour	Issy Cooke	1428		
Labour	Helen Laker	1279		
Labour	Mohammed Khan	1222		
Reform	Dee Blackburn	979		
Reform	Elaine Greenwood	976		
Reform	Gary Hubbard	924		
Conservative	David Bennett	528		
Conservative	Dorian Woodward	380		
Conservative	Lenin Erazo	367		
Liberal Democrats	Martha Parkhurst	236		
Liberal Democrats	Duncan Wharton	184		
Independent	Hetal Padhiar	57		

=== Shooters Hill ===
Shooters Hill (2 seats)
Party	Candidate	Votes	%	±%
Green	Tamasin Rhymes	1,569		
Green	Max Green	1,483		
Labour	Timothy Folaranmi	968		
Labour	Kim Sullivan	830		
Reform	Steve Greenwood	475		
Reform	Paul Walker	466		
Conservative	Michael Dowd	275		
Conservative	Sam Shuker	225		
Liberal Democrats	Kirstie Sheddon	141		
Liberal Democrats	Valerie Stainton	108		

=== Thamesmead Moorings ===
Thamesmead Moorings (2 seats)
Party	Candidate	Votes	%	±%
Labour	Femi Solola	1,202		
Labour	Averil Lekau	1,186		
Reform	Jill Davies	537		
Reform	Fergus McClelland	486		
Green	Tinu Cornish	477		
Green	Keith Crowhurst	412		
Conservative	Diane Morris	204		
Conservative	James Worron	161		
Liberal Democrats	Rhian O’Connor	89		
Liberal Democrats	Philip Symes	66		

=== West Thamesmead ===
West Thamesmead (2 seats)
Party	Candidate	Votes	%	±%
Labour	Nathan Baffour-Awuah	718		
Labour	Jahdia Spencer	589		
Green	Raul Diaz	572		
Green	Samuel Hedges	561		
Reform	Kathryn Breeden	341		
Liberal Democrats	Emmanuel Idowu	328		
Reform	Josif Gjoka	276		
Conservative	Ezra Aydin	223		
Liberal Democrats	Mursal Siyid	210		
Conservative	Ibrahim Shittu	187		

=== Woolwich Arsenal ===
Woolwich Arsenal (3 seats)
Party	Candidate	Votes	%	±%
Labour	Joshua Ayodele	1,249		
Labour	Sam Littlewood	1,103		
Labour	Jackie Smith	1,072		
Green	Nathan Budden	1023		
Green	Karen Janody	976		
Green	Sangeeta Kalia	967		
Conservative	Paul Brown	417		
Reform	Alex Bowers	411		
Reform	Tricia Kelly	386		
Reform	Anthony Nwabudike	350		
Conservative	Aileen Davis	345		
Conservative	Hugh O'Leary	343		
Liberal Democrats	Andrew Lock	295		
Liberal Democrats	Michaela Moores	283		
Liberal Democrats	Ramesh Perera-Delacourt	238		

=== Woolwich Common ===
Woolwich Common (2 seats)
Party	Candidate	Votes	%	±%
Labour	Elizabeth Ige	1,056		
Labour	Anthony Okereke	1,032		
Green	Kirsty Gardiner	808		
Green	Sem Longhurst	666		
Reform	Selina Mayne	341		
Reform	Alan Cecil	317		
Conservative	Jonathan Morris	208		
Conservative	Victoria Wilson	194		
Liberal Democrats	Matthew Glinsman	146		
Liberal Democrats	Ulysse Abbate	139		

=== Woolwich Dockyard ===
Woolwich Dockyard (2 seats)
Party	Candidate	Votes	%	±%
Labour	Asli Mohammed	1,082		
Labour	Raja Zeeshan	972		
Green	Dakota Gibbs	779		
Green	DJ Cracknell	580		
Reform	David Chunu	387		
Reform	Rozalia Protea	372		
Your Party	Tom Adhikari	344		
Conservative	Paul Butler	289		
Conservative	Patricia Gossington	227		
Liberal Democrats	David Kaye	163		
Liberal Democrats	Matti Pekkola	93		
