= Greenwich and Woolwich =

UK Parliament constituency (since 1997)

Coordinates: 51.483°N 0.028°E

- Borough constituency for the House of Commons
- Interactive map of boundaries from 2024
- Location within Greater London
- County: Greater London
- Electorate: 69,824 (March 2020)
- Major settlements: Greenwich, Woolwich and Charlton

Current constituency
- Created: 1997
- Member of Parliament: Matthew Pennycook (Labour)
- Seats: One
- Created from: Greenwich, Woolwich

Greenwich and Woolwich is a constituency represented in the House of Commons of the UK Parliament since 2015 by Matthew Pennycook of the Labour Party. (Note: MP for Greenwich (UK Parliament constituency) 1992–97) (Note: As with all constituencies, Greenwich and Woolwich elects one Member of Parliament (MP) by the first past the post system of election at least every five years.)

== Constituency profile ==
Greenwich and Woolwich is a constituency located in Greater London in the Royal Borough of Greenwich. It lies on the south bank of the River Thames to the east of the centre of London. It covers the neighbourhoods of Greenwich, Woolwich, Charlton and parts of Deptford and Blackheath. Greenwich has an astronomical and maritime history as the site of the Royal Observatory and Maritime Greenwich, a UNESCO World Heritage Site. The Greenwich Peninsula has an industrial history as a former centre for coal gas and cement production. Greenwich is generally affluent with below-average levels of deprivation. Woolwich is highly-deprived and is undergoing urban regeneration; the area experienced economic decline after the closure of factories during the 1960s. Many residents of Woolwich live in council housing. House prices across the constituency are generally higher than the rest of the country but lower than the London average.

Compared to the rest of the country, residents of the constituency are young, well-educated and generally live in private rented accommodation. They have high rates of professional employment, and household income is high compared to the nationwide average and in line with the rest of London. White people made up 55% of the population at the 2021 census, a similar proportion to the rest of London, with White British people making up 38% of all residents. Black people were the largest ethnic minority group at 20% and Asians were 14%. At the local council level, all seats in the constituency are represented by Labour Party councillors. Voters in the constituency strongly supported remaining in the European Union in the 2016 referendum; an estimated 67% voted to remain compared to 48% nationwide.

== History ==
Since 1997

The constituency was created for the 1997 general election by the merger of the former Greenwich constituency, and the western half of the former Woolwich constituency. It has been controlled by the Labour Party since its creation, when they polled 63.4% of the vote and a majority of 44.8%. Thirteen years later, the 2010 general election produced the smallest majority as a share of the vote, 24.7%, with the Labour candidate taking 49.2% of votes cast.

The 2015 general election result was the 105th-safest Labour majority of 232 seats won by Labour at that election.

Greenwich forerunner

Reflecting a demographic split in the latter twentieth century were five and eleven-year periods when the two predecessor seats were represented by candidates from the SDP.

The former Greenwich constituency was a secure Labour Party seat for much of the twentieth century, though it had been a safe Liberal seat throughout most of the nineteenth century. In 1987, it was gained by the Social Democratic Party at a by-election and narrowly regained by Labour five years later at the 1992 general election.

Woolwich forerunner

The former Woolwich constituency (and its predecessor Woolwich East) was a similar safe-Liberal-seat-turned-safe-Labour-seat. Its Labour MP Christopher Mayhew defected to the Liberal Party in 1974 before being defeated, and his Labour successor, John Cartwright, defected to the SDP in 1981. He retained the seat at the 1983 and 1987 general elections, but narrowly lost it to Labour in 1992; in a similar fashion to the neighboring Greenwich seat. In council elections, since the seat's 1997 creation, most wards have tended to elect Labour councillors and few wards other than the Blackheath Westcombe ward have tended to elect Conservative councilors.

1945-1997 combined summary

Including the pre-1997 predecessors, the area has since World War II been a Labour safe seat, or, as indicated in the 1987 result for Greenwich only, in the best result for a Conservative candidate locally during the years since 1955, occasionally a marginal. (Note: The winning majority was 5.7% over the Conservative challenger.)

== Boundaries ==
=== Historic ===
1997–2010: The London Borough of Greenwich wards of Arsenal, Blackheath, Burrage, Charlton, Ferrier, Hornfair, Kidbrooke, Nightingale, Rectory Field, St Alfege, St Mary's, Trafalgar, Vanbrugh, West, and Woolwich Common.

2010–2024: The London Borough of Greenwich wards of Blackheath Westcombe, Charlton, Glyndon, Greenwich West, Peninsula, Woolwich Common, and Woolwich Riverside.

Part of Woolwich Common ward transferred to Greenwich and Woolwich from the constituency of Eltham; parts of Glyndon ward transferred from Eltham and Erith and Thamesmead; and parts of Kidbrooke with Hornfair, Eltham West, and Middle Park & Sutcliffe wards be transferred from Greenwich and Woolwich to Eltham.

=== Current ===
Further to the 2023 review of Westminster constituencies, which came into effect for the 2024 general election, the Glyndon ward (as it existed on 1 December 2010) was transferred to Erith and Thamesmead in order to bring the electorate within the permitted range.

Following a local government boundary review which came into effect in May 2022, the constituency now comprises the following wards of the Royal Borough of Greenwich from the 2024 general election:

- Blackheath Westcombe (most), Charlton Hornfair (most), Charlton Village and Riverside, East Greenwich, Greenwich Creekside, Greenwich Park, Greenwich Peninsula, Woolwich Arsenal (most), Woolwich Common (most), Woolwich Dockyard, and small parts of Shooters Hill and Plumstead Common.

== Members of Parliament ==
Election	Member	Party
1997	Nick Raynsford	Labour
2015	Matthew Pennycook	Labour

== Election results ==
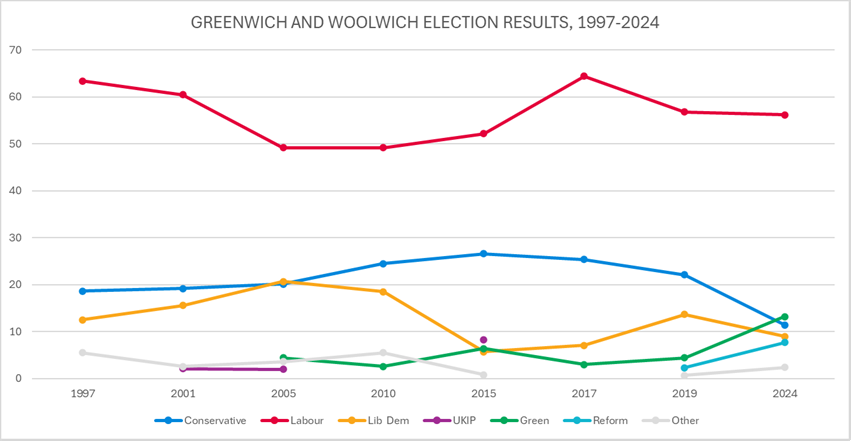
Election results 1997-2024

=== Elections in the 2020s ===
General election 2024: Greenwich and Woolwich
Party	Candidate	Votes	%	±%
Labour	Matthew Pennycook	23,999	56.2	+1.2
Green	Stacy Smith	5,633	13.2	+8.6
Conservative	Jonathan Goff	4,863	11.4	–11.3
Liberal Democrats	Chris Annous	3,865	9.0	–5.6
Reform	Abdoul Ndiaye	3,305	7.7	+5.4
Workers Party	Sheikh Raquib	570	1.3	N/A
Independent	Niko Omilana	311	0.7	N/A
Climate	Priyank Bakshi	173	0.4	N/A
Majority		18,366	43.0	+10.7
Turnout		42,719	58.1	–9.7
Registered electors		73,573		
Labour hold		Swing	▼3.7	

=== Elections in the 2010s ===
2019 notional result
Party	Vote	%
Labour	26,043	55.0
Conservative	10,760	22.7
Liberal Democrats	6,902	14.6
Green	2,176	4.6
Brexit Party	1,089	2.3
Others	370	0.8
Turnout	47,340	67.8
Electorate	69,824	

General election 2019: Greenwich and Woolwich
Party	Candidate	Votes	%	±%
Labour	Matthew Pennycook	30,185	56.8	−7.6
Conservative	Thomas Turrell	11,721	22.1	−3.3
Liberal Democrats	Rhian O'Connor	7,253	13.7	+6.6
Green	Victoria Rance	2,363	4.4	+1.4
Brexit Party	Kailash Trivedi	1,228	2.3	N/A
CPA	Eunice Odesanmi	245	0.5	N/A
Independent	Shushil Gaikwad	125	0.2	N/A
Majority		18,464	34.7	−4.3
Turnout		53,120	66.4	−2.4
Registered electors		79,997		
Labour hold		Swing	-2.1	

General election 2017: Greenwich and Woolwich
Party	Candidate	Votes	%	±%
Labour	Matthew Pennycook	34,215	64.4	+12.2
Conservative	Caroline Attfield	13,501	25.4	−1.2
Liberal Democrats	Chris Adams	3,785	7.1	+1.4
Green	Daniel Garrun	1,605	3.0	−3.4
Majority		20,714	39.0	+13.4
Turnout		53,107	68.8	+5.1
Registered electors		77,190		
Labour hold		Swing	+6.7	

General election 2015: Greenwich and Woolwich
Party	Candidate	Votes	%	±%
Labour	Matthew Pennycook	24,384	52.2	+3.0
Conservative	Matt Hartley	12,438	26.6	+2.1
UKIP	Ryan Acty	3,888	8.3	N/A
Green	Abbey Akinoshun	2,991	6.4	+3.8
Liberal Democrats	Tom Holder	2,645	5.7	−12.8
TUSC	Lynne Chamberlain	370	0.8	+0.2
Majority		11,946	25.6	+0.9
Turnout		46,716	63.7	+0.8
Registered electors		73,315		
Labour hold		Swing	+0.5	

General election 2010: Greenwich and Woolwich
Party	Candidate	Votes	%	±%
Labour	Nick Raynsford	20,262	49.2	−3.3
Conservative	Spencer Drury	10,109	24.5	+7.0
Liberal Democrats	Joseph Lee	7,498	18.5	−1.5
BNP	Lawrence Rustem	1,151	2.8	N/A
Green	Andy Hewett	1,054	2.6	−1.9
Christian	Edward Adeyele	443	1.1	N/A
English Democrat	Raden Wresniwiro	339	0.8	−2.6
TUSC	Onay Kasab	267	0.6	N/A
No description	Tammy Alingham	61	0.2	N/A
Majority		10,153	24.7	−3.8
Turnout		41,184	62.9	+9.6
Registered electors		65,489		
Labour hold		Swing	-5.1	

=== Elections in the 2000s ===
General election 2005: Greenwich and Woolwich
Party	Candidate	Votes	%	±%
Labour	Nick Raynsford	17,527	49.2	−11.3
Liberal Democrats	Christopher Le Breton	7,381	20.7	+5.1
Conservative	Alistair Craig	7,142	20.1	+0.9
Green	David Sharman	1,579	4.4	N/A
English Democrat	Garry Bushell	1,216	3.4	N/A
UKIP	Stan Gain	709	2.0	−0.1
Independent	Purvarani Nagalingam	61	0.2	N/A
Majority		10,146	28.5	−12.8
Turnout		35,615	55.6	+1.5
Registered electors		63,631		
Labour hold		Swing	-8.2	

General election 2001: Greenwich and Woolwich
Party	Candidate	Votes	%	±%
Labour	Nick Raynsford	19,691	60.5	−2.9
Conservative	Richard Forsdyke	6,258	19.2	+0.6
Liberal Democrats	Russell Pyne	5,082	15.6	+3.1
UKIP	Stan Gain	672	2.1	N/A
Socialist Alliance	Kirstie Paton	481	1.5	N/A
Socialist Labour	Margaret Sharkey	352	1.1	N/A
Majority		13,433	41.3	−3.5
Turnout		32,536	54.1	−11.8
Registered electors		60,114		
Labour hold		Swing	-1.8	

=== Elections in the 1990s ===
General election 1997: Greenwich and Woolwich
Party	Candidate	Votes	%	±%
Labour	Nick Raynsford	25,630	63.4	
Conservative	Michael Mitchell	7,502	18.6	
Liberal Democrats	Cherry Luxton	5,049	12.5	
Referendum	Douglas Ellison	1,670	4.1	
Fellowship	Ronald Mallone	428	1.1	
Constitutionalist	David Martin-Eagle	124	0.3	
Majority		18,128	44.8	
Turnout		40,403	65.9	
Registered electors		61,352		
Labour win (new seat)				

== See also ==
- List of parliamentary constituencies in London
