= Eltham and Chislehurst =

UK Parliament constituency (since 2024)

- Borough constituency for the House of Commons
- Interactive map of boundaries from 2024
- Location within Greater London
- County: Greater London
- Electorate: 74,179 (March 2020)

Current constituency
- Created: 2024
- Member of Parliament: Clive Efford (Labour)
- Seats: One
- Created from: Eltham; Bromley and Chislehurst

Eltham and Chislehurst is a constituency of the House of Commons in the UK Parliament. Created as a result of the 2023 review of Westminster constituencies, it was first contested at the 2024 general election, since when it has been represented by Clive Efford of the Labour Party. Efford had been the MP for the predecessor seat of Eltham from 1997 to 2024.

== Constituency profile ==
Eltham and Chislehurst is a suburban constituency located in the south of London. It covers the neighbourhoods of Eltham, Chislehurst, Mottingham and parts of Blackheath. The area was rural before being developed in the interwar period. There is some deprivation in Eltham, whilst Chislehurst is affluent and falls within the 10% least-deprived areas in England. House prices are below London averages but above nationwide averages.

In general, residents of the constituency have average levels of education and professional employment. Household income is similar to the London average. White people made up 71% of the population at the 2021 census. Black people were the largest ethnic minority group at 11% and Asians were 9%. At the local council level, the north of the constituency closer to central London is represented by Labour Party councillors, whilst Chislehurst elected Conservatives and independents. An estimated 51% of voters in the constituency supported leaving the European Union in the 2016 referendum, similar to the nationwide figure and a higher rate than the rest of London.

== Boundaries ==
Under the 2023 boundary review, the constituency was defined as comprising the following wards as they existed on 1 December 2020:

- The London Borough of Bromley wards of Chislehurst; Mottingham and Chislehurst North.
- The Royal Borough of Greenwich wards of: Coldharbour and New Eltham; Eltham North; Eltham South; Eltham West; Kidbrooke with Hornfair; Middle Park and Sutcliffe.

The Borough of Greenwich wards comprise the bulk of the abolished constituency of Eltham. The Borough of Bromley wards were transferred from the former constituency of Bromley and Chislehurst.

Following local government boundary reviews in both boroughs which came into effect in May 2022, the constituency now comprises the following from the 2024 general election:

- The London Borough of Bromley wards of Chislehurst and Mottingham.
- The Royal Borough of Greenwich wards of: Blackheath Westcombe (part), Charlton Hornfair (part), Eltham Page, Eltham Park and Progress, Eltham Town and Avery Hill, Kidbrooke Park, Kidbrooke Village and Sutcliffe, Middle Park and Horn Park, and Mottingham, Coldharbour and New Eltham.

== Election results ==
=== Elections in the 2020s ===
General election 2024: Eltham and Chislehurst
Party	Candidate	Votes	%	±%
Labour	Clive Efford	20,069	44.0	+3.9
Conservative	Charlie Davis	11,640	25.5	−21.4
Reform	Mark Simpson	7,428	16.3	+13.7
Green	Sam Gabriel	3,079	6.8	+3.8
Liberal Democrats	Ulysse Abbate	2,423	5.3	−2.2
Workers Party	Sean Stewart	356	0.8	N/A
Independent	Arnold Tarling	307	0.7	N/A
Independent	Christian Hacking	173	0.4	N/A
Independent	John Courtneidge	91	0.2	N/A
Majority		8,429	18.5	N/A
Turnout		45,566	61.4	−7.5
Registered electors		74,224		
Labour win (new seat)				

=== Elections in the 2010s ===
2019 notional result
Party	Vote	%
Conservative	23,936	46.9
Labour	20,492	40.1
Liberal Democrats	3,826	7.5
Green	1,516	3.0
Brexit Party	1,317	2.6
Turnout	51,087	68.9
Electorate	74,179	
