= Erith and Thamesmead =

UK Parliament constituency (since 1997)

Coordinates: 51.494°N 0.132°E

- Borough constituency for the House of Commons
- Interactive map of boundaries from 2024
- Location within Greater London
- County: Greater London
- Electorate: 76,728 (March 2020)
- Major settlements: Erith, Belvedere, Plumstead, Thamesmead

Current constituency
- Created: 1997
- Member of Parliament: Abena Oppong-Asare (Labour)
- Seats: One
- Created from: Woolwich and Erith & Crayford

Erith and Thamesmead (/ˈɪərɪθ ... tɛmzmiːd/) is a constituency (Note: A borough constituency (for the purposes of election expenses and type of returning officer)) created in 1997 and represented in the House of Commons of the UK Parliament since 2019 by Abena Oppong-Asare of the Labour Party. (Note: As with all constituencies, Erith and Thamesmead elects one Member of Parliament (MP) by the first past the post system of election at least every five years.)

== Constituency profile ==
The Erith and Thamesmead constituency is located in the east of Greater London on the south bank of the River Thames, and is made up of parts of the boroughs of Bexley and Greenwich. It contains the neighbourhoods of Erith, Thamesmead, Belvedere, Abbey Wood, Plumstead and Shooter's Hill. Much of the area, especially Thamesmead, was developed for social housing in the 1960s. There is a large industrial area on the bank of the river, which includes Crossness Sewage Treatment Works, and the constituency is the site of Isis, Thameside and Belmarsh prisons, the latter of which holds some of the country's most high-profile prisoners. The constituency has high levels of deprivation and house prices are around half the London average.

In general, residents of the constituency are young and have low levels of education, income and professional employment compared to the rest of London. The constituency is ethnically diverse; at the 2021 census, 46% of the population were White, 31% were Black and 14% were Asian. The Black community is concentrated in Thamesmead and the Asian community in Plumstead. At the local borough council level, all wards in the constituency are represented by Labour Party councillors. An estimated 53% of voters in the constituency supported leaving the European Union in the 2016 referendum, similar to the nationwide figure and higher than the rest of London.

== History ==
The seat was created for the 1997 general election from parts of the old Woolwich and Erith and Crayford constituencies.

John Austin was the MP for this constituency from its creation for the 1997 general election until he stepped down at the 2010 election. The seat was then held for Labour by a local activist Teresa Pearce, who defeated the Conservative candidate Colin Bloom, a councillor for Bickley ward in Bromley.

Pearce increased her majority at the 2015 general election to rank 125th of the party's 232 MPs then elected.

=== 2010 Labour selection controversy ===
In April 2009, an investigation took place into the tampering of ballot boxes and abuse of the postal vote system used for the selection of the prospective Labour candidate for Erith and Thamesmead. A rerun of the candidate selection ballot resulted in victory for Teresa Pearce.

== Boundaries ==
=== Historic ===
Map of boundaries 2010–2024

1997–2010: The London Borough of Bexley wards of Belvedere, Erith, Northumberland Heath, and Thamesmead East, and the London Borough of Greenwich wards of Abbey Wood, Eynsham, Glyndon, Lakedale, St Nicholas, and Thamesmead Moorings.

2010–2024: The London Borough of Bexley wards of Belvedere, Erith, Lesnes Abbey, Northumberland Heath, and Thamesmead East, and the London Borough of Greenwich wards of Abbey Wood, Plumstead, and Thamesmead Moorings.

Following its 2007 review of parliamentary representation in South London, and as a consequence of changes to ward boundaries, the Boundary Commission for England recommended for the 2010 general election that parts of Glyndon ward and Colyers ward be transferred from Erith and Thamesmead to the constituencies of Greenwich and Woolwich and Bexleyheath and Crayford respectively; that part of Plumstead ward be transferred to Erith and Thamesmead from Eltham; and that parts of Lesnes Abbey ward, Northumberland Heath ward and Erith ward be transferred to Erith and Thamesmead from Bexleyheath and Crayford.

=== Current ===
Further to the 2023 review of Westminster constituencies, which came into effect for the 2024 general election, the constituency was defined as comprising the following wards as they existed on 1 December 2020:

- The London Borough of Bexley wards of: Belvedere; Erith; Thamesmead East.
- The Royal Borough of Greenwich wards of: Abbey Wood; Glyndon; Plumstead; Shooters Hill; Thamesmead Moorings.

The Greenwich Borough wards of Glyndon and Shooters Hill were transferred from Greenwich and Woolwich, and Eltham (now Eltham and Chislehurst) respectively. To partly compensate, southernmost parts in Bexley Borough were transferred to Bexleyheath and Crayford.

Following a local government boundary review in the Borough of Greenwich which came into effect in May 2022, the constituency now comprises the following from the 2024 general election:

- The London Borough of Bexley wards of Belvedere, Erith, and Thamesmead East.
- The Royal Borough of Greenwich wards of Abbey Wood, Plumstead & Glyndon, Plumstead Common (most), Shooters Hill (most), Thamesmead Moorings, West Thamesmead, and small parts of Woolwich Arsenal and Woolwich Common.

== Members of Parliament ==
| Election | Member | Party |
|---|---|---|
| 1997 | John Austin | Labour |
| 2010 | Teresa Pearce | Labour |
| 2019 | Abena Oppong-Asare | Labour |

== Election results ==
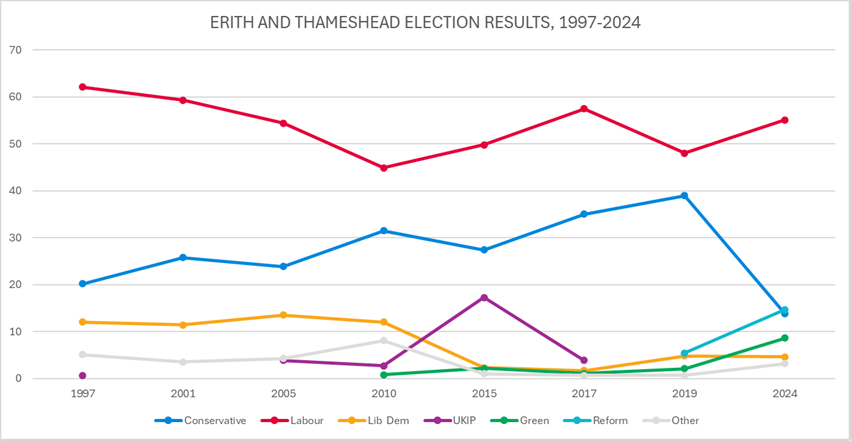
Election results 1997-2024

=== Elections in the 2020s ===
General election 2024: Erith and Thamesmead
| Party | Candidate | Votes | % | ±% |
|---|---|---|---|---|
| Labour | Abena Oppong-Asare | 22,246 | 55.1 | −3.3 |
| Reform | Michael Pastor | 5,944 | 14.7 | +9.7 |
| Conservative | Richard Mark | 5,564 | 13.8 | −14.4 |
| Green | Sarah Barry | 3,482 | 8.6 | +5.8 |
| Liberal Democrats | Pierce Chalmers | 1,872 | 4.6 | −0.3 |
| Workers Party | Mohammed Shahed | 1,071 | 2.7 | N/A |
| Independent | Diana Diamond | 200 | 0.5 | N/A |
| Majority | | 16,302 | 40.4 | +10.3 |
| Turnout | | 40,379 | 51.2 | −5.0 |
| Registered electors | | 78,886 | | |
| Labour hold | | Swing | ▼6.5 | |

=== Elections in the 2010s ===
2019 notional result
| Party | Vote | % |
|---|---|---|
| Labour | 25,141 | 58.4 |
| Conservative | 12,153 | 28.2 |
| Brexit Party | 2,174 | 5.0 |
| Liberal Democrats | 2,119 | 4.9 |
| Green | 1,226 | 2.8 |
| Others | 272 | 0.6 |
| Turnout | 43,085 | 56.2 |
| Electorate | 76,728 | |

General election 2019: Erith and Thamesmead
| Party | Candidate | Votes | % | ±% |
|---|---|---|---|---|
| Labour | Abena Oppong-Asare | 19,882 | 48.0 | −9.5 |
| Conservative | Joe Robertson | 16,124 | 39.0 | +4.0 |
| Brexit Party | Tom Bright | 2,246 | 5.4 | N/A |
| Liberal Democrats | Sam Webber | 1,984 | 4.8 | +3.1 |
| Green | Claudine Letsae | 876 | 2.1 | +1.0 |
| CPA | Richard Mitchell | 272 | 0.7 | +0.2 |
| Majority | | 3,758 | 9.0 | −13.5 |
| Turnout | | 41,284 | 63.3 | −0.5 |
| Registered electors | | 65,399 | | |
| Labour hold | | Swing | -6.7 | |

General election 2017: Erith and Thamesmead
| Party | Candidate | Votes | % | ±% |
|---|---|---|---|---|
| Labour | Teresa Pearce | 25,585 | 57.5 | +7.7 |
| Conservative | Edward Baxter | 15,571 | 35.0 | +7.6 |
| UKIP | Ronie Johnson | 1,728 | 3.9 | −13.4 |
| Liberal Democrats | Simon Waddington | 750 | 1.7 | −0.6 |
| Green | Claudine Letsae | 507 | 1.1 | −1.1 |
| CPA | Temi Olodu | 243 | 0.5 | −0.1 |
| Independent | Doro Oddiri | 80 | 0.2 | N/A |
| Majority | | 10,014 | 22.5 | +0.1 |
| Turnout | | 44,464 | 63.8 | +3.3 |
| Registered electors | | 69,724 | | |
| Labour hold | | Swing | +0.1 | |

General election 2015: Erith and Thamesmead
| Party | Candidate | Votes | % | ±% |
|---|---|---|---|---|
| Labour | Teresa Pearce | 21,209 | 49.8 | +4.9 |
| Conservative | Anna Firth | 11,684 | 27.4 | −4.1 |
| UKIP | Ronie Johnson | 7,368 | 17.3 | +14.6 |
| Liberal Democrats | Simon Waddington | 972 | 2.3 | −9.7 |
| Green | Ann Garrett | 941 | 2.2 | +1.4 |
| CPA | Sidney Cordle | 255 | 0.6 | −0.3 |
| English Democrat | Graham Moore | 188 | 0.4 | −0.7 |
| Majority | | 9,525 | 22.4 | +9.0 |
| Turnout | | 42,617 | 60.5 | −0.3 |
| Registered electors | | 70,397 | | |
| Labour hold | | Swing | +4.5 | |

General election 2010: Erith and Thamesmead
| Party | Candidate | Votes | % | ±% |
|---|---|---|---|---|
| Labour | Teresa Pearce | 19,068 | 44.9 | −7.9 |
| Conservative | Colin Bloom | 13,365 | 31.5 | +4.9 |
| Liberal Democrats | Alex Cunliffe | 5,116 | 12.0 | −0.0 |
| BNP | Kevin Saunders | 2,184 | 5.1 | +0.9 |
| UKIP | Pamela Perrin | 1,139 | 2.7 | −1.1 |
| English Democrat | Laurence Williams | 465 | 1.1 | N/A |
| Independent | Abbey Akinoshun | 438 | 1.0 | N/A |
| CPA | Sidney Cordle | 379 | 0.9 | N/A |
| Green | Marek Powley | 322 | 0.8 | N/A |
| Majority | | 5,703 | 13.4 | −17.1 |
| Turnout | | 42,476 | 60.8 | +7.1 |
| Registered electors | | 69,900 | | |
| Labour hold | | Swing | −6.4 | |

=== Elections in the 2000s ===
2005 notional result
| Party | Vote | % |
|---|---|---|
| Labour | 19,926 | 52.8 |
| Conservative | 10,038 | 26.6 |
| Liberal Democrats | 4,553 | 12.1 |
| Others | 3,220 | 8.5 |
| Turnout | 37,737 | 53.8 |
| Electorate | 70,127 | |

General election 2005: Erith and Thamesmead
| Party | Candidate | Votes | % | ±% |
|---|---|---|---|---|
| Labour | John Austin | 20,483 | 54.4 | −4.9 |
| Conservative | Chris R. Bromby | 8,983 | 23.9 | −1.9 |
| Liberal Democrats | Steven T. Toole | 5,088 | 13.5 | +2.1 |
| BNP | Brian Ravenscroft | 1,620 | 4.3 | N/A |
| UKIP | Barrie R. Thomas | 1,477 | 3.9 | N/A |
| Majority | | 11,500 | 30.5 | −3.0 |
| Turnout | | 37,651 | 52.3 | +2.1 |
| Registered electors | | 72,058 | | |
| Labour hold | | Swing | −7.7 | |

General election 2001: Erith and Thamesmead
| Party | Candidate | Votes | % | ±% |
|---|---|---|---|---|
| Labour | John Austin | 19,769 | 59.3 | −2.8 |
| Conservative | Mark Brooks | 8,602 | 25.8 | +5.6 |
| Liberal Democrats | Barry Kempton | 3,800 | 11.4 | −0.6 |
| Socialist Labour | Hardev Singh Dhillon | 1,180 | 3.5 | N/A |
| Majority | | 11,167 | 33.5 | −8.4 |
| Turnout | | 33,351 | 50.2 | −15.4 |
| Registered electors | | 66,371 | | |
| Labour hold | | Swing | -4.2 | |

=== Elections in the 1990s ===
General election 1997: Erith and Thamesmead
| Party | Candidate | Votes | % | ±% |
|---|---|---|---|---|
| Labour | John Austin | 25,812 | 62.1 | +19.1 |
| Conservative | Nadhim Zahawi | 8,388 | 20.2 | –11.4 |
| Liberal Democrats | Alex H.C. Grigg | 5,001 | 12.0 | –13.4 |
| Referendum | John E. Flunder | 1,394 | 3.4 | N/A |
| BNP | Victor J. Dooley | 718 | 1.7 | N/A |
| UKIP | M.L. Jackson | 274 | 0.7 | N/A |
| Majority | | 17,424 | 41.9 | +30.5 |
| Turnout | | 41,587 | 65.6 | –8.6 |
| Registered electors | | 63,417 | | |
| Labour win (new seat) | | | | |

1992 notional result
| Party | Vote | % |
|---|---|---|
| Labour | 21,245 | 43.0 |
| Conservative | 15,615 | 31.6 |
| Liberal Democrats | 12,555 | 25.4 |
| Turnout | 49,415 | 74.2 |
| Electorate | 66,600 | |

== See also ==
- List of parliamentary constituencies in London
