= 2022 Greenwich London Borough Council election =

2022 local election in Greenwich

- 5 May 2022

All 55 seats to Greenwich London Borough Council 28 seats needed for a majority
- Turnout: 33.4%
	First party	Second party
Leader	Dan Thorpe	Nigel Fletcher
Party	Labour	Conservative
Last election	42 seats, 55.9%	9 seats, 23.6%
Seats won	52	3
Seat change	▲10	▼6
Popular vote	88,610	35,337
Percentage	57.9%	23.1%
Swing	▲2.0%	▼0.5%
- Map of the results of the 2022 Greenwich London Borough Council election. Conservatives in blue, Labour in red.
council control before election
2018
Labour
Subsequent council control
2022
Labour

The 2022 Greenwich London Borough Council election took place on 5 May 2022. All 55 members of Greenwich London Borough Council were elected. The elections took place alongside local elections in the other London boroughs and elections to local authorities across the United Kingdom.

In the previous election in 2018, the Labour Party maintained its longstanding control of the council, winning 42 out of the 51 seats with the Conservative Party forming the council opposition with the remaining 9 seats. The 2022 election took place under new election boundaries, which increased the number of councillors to 55.

== Background ==
=== History ===
Result of the 2018 borough election

The thirty-two London boroughs were established in 1965 by the London Government Act 1963. They are the principal authorities in Greater London and have responsibilities including education, housing, planning, highways, social services, libraries, recreation, waste, environmental health and revenue collection. Some of the powers are shared with the Greater London Authority, which also manages passenger transport, police and fire.

Since its formation, Greenwich has been continuously under Labour control except for the period from 1968 to 1971 when it was under Conservative control. Councillors have been elected from the Labour Party, Conservative Party, Liberal Democrats and the Social Democratic Party. The Liberal Democrats lost their most recent seats in the 2010 election with all seats since being won by Labour or the Conservatives. In the most recent election in 2018, Labour won 42 seats with 55.9% of the vote and the Conservatives won 9 seats with 23.6% of the vote. The Liberal Democrats received 8.6% of the vote and the Green Party received 7.7% of the vote, but neither party won any seats. The incumbent leader of the council is the Labour councillor Danny Thorpe, who has held that position since 2018.

=== Council term ===
A Labour councillor for Glyndon, Tonia Ashikodi, was given a suspended sentence for property fraud in March 2020. She resigned on the same day. She had declared she had no other property when she became a council tenant in 2008 and repeated the claim in 2012, while owning three rental homes. Due to the ongoing COVID-19 pandemic, it was not possible to hold a by-election until May 2021.

In April 2020, a Labour councillor for Kidbrooke with Hornfair, Christine Grice, died. She had served on the council since 2014 and had been elected as deputy leader shortly before her death. The council's finance cabinet member and a Labour councillor for Shooters Hill, Chris Kirby, announced his resignation in January 2021. He was moving with his family to the Peak District. A Labour councillor for Greenwich West, Mehboob Khan, announced his resignation in February 2021 due to taking a politically restricted job working for Redbridge London Borough Council. He had previously been the leader of Kirklees Council in Yorkshire, remaining a councillor there for some time after moving to Greenwich and had served on Greenwich council since 2015

By-elections to fill all vacancies were held in May 2021 alongside the 2021 London mayoral election and London Assembly election. Labour held all four seats, with Sandra Bauer winning in Glyndon, Odette McGahey winning in Kidbrooke with Hornfair, Clare Burke-McDonald winning in Shooters Hill and Pat Slattery winning in Greenwich West

Along with most other London boroughs, Greenwich was subject to a boundary review ahead of the 2022 election. The Local Government Boundary Commission for England concluded that the council should have 55 seats, an increase of four, and produced new election boundaries following a period of consultation. The new scheme consists of nine three-councillor wards and fourteen two-councillor wards.

== Electoral process ==
Greenwich, like other London borough councils, elects all of its councillors at once every four years. The previous election took place in 2018. The election took place by multi-member first-past-the-post voting, with each ward being represented by two or three councillors. Electors had as many votes as there are councillors to be elected in their ward, with the top two or three being elected.

All registered electors (British, Irish, Commonwealth and European Union citizens) living in London aged 18 or over were entitled to vote in the election. People who lived at two addresses in different councils, such as university students with different term-time and holiday addresses, were entitled to be registered for and vote in elections in both local authorities. Voting in-person at polling stations took place from 7:00 to 22:00 on election day, and voters were able to apply for postal votes or proxy votes in advance of the election.

== Previous council composition ==
Council composition after the 2018 election

Council composition ahead of the 2022 election

After 2018 election		Before 2022 election	
Party	Seats	Party	Seats
Labour	42	Labour	42
Conservative	9	Conservative	9

== Results summary ==
2022 Greenwich London Borough Council election
Party	Seats	Gains	Losses	Net gain/loss	Seats %	Votes %	Votes	+/−
Labour	52	1	0	▲10	94.5	57.9	88,610	+2.0
Conservative	3	0	1	▼6	5.5	23.1	35,337	-0.5
Green	0	0	0	Steady	0.0	12.0	18,425	+4.3
Liberal Democrats	0	0	0	Steady	0.0	6.1	9,401	-2.5
Reform	0	0	0	Steady	0.0	0.5	749	New
Britain First	0	0	0	Steady	0.0	0.2	255	New
Monster Raving Loony	0	0	0	Steady	0.0	0.1	125	±0.0
Independent	0	0	0	Steady	0.0	0.1	118	-0.6
Communist	0	0	0	Steady	0.0	0.1	79	New

== Ward results ==
=== Abbey Wood ===
Abbey Wood (3)
Party	Candidate	Votes	%	±%
Labour	Peter Baker	1,980	66.8	
Labour	Ann-Marie Cousins*	1,964	66.2	+0.7
Labour	Denise Hyland*	1,929	65.1	+6.5
Conservative	David Brinson	569	19.2	
Green	James Brandon	526	17.7	
Conservative	Brenda Lobo	506	17.1	
Conservative	Brian Weller	499	16.8	
Green	Roberto Mirabella	374	12.6	
Green	Aruhan Galieva	338	11.4	
Liberal Democrats	Anthony Durham	211	7.1	
Turnout			28.0	
Labour hold		Swing		
Labour hold		Swing		
Labour hold		Swing		

=== Blackheath Westcombe ===
Blackheath Westcombe (3)
Party	Candidate	Votes	%	±%
Labour	Mariam Lolavar*	2,467	49.0	+5.6
Labour	Leo Fletcher*	2,372	47.1	+7.4
Labour	Christine St Matthew-Daniel	2,170	43.1	
Conservative	Geoff Brighty*	1,621	32.2	−6.4
Conservative	Daniel McGinley	1,245	24.7	
Conservative	Naveed Mughal	1,166	23.2	
Green	Victoria Rance	876	17.4	+8.3
Green	Christopher Edgar	672	13.4	
Green	Philip Malivoire	629	12.5	
Liberal Democrats	Lee Coppack	618	12.3	
Liberal Democrats	Pierce Chalmers	578	11.5	
Liberal Democrats	Roger Spence	477	9.5	
Monster Raving Loony	Trevor Allman	125	2.5	+0.2
Communist	Stewart McGill	79	1.6	
Turnout			46.4	
Labour hold		Swing		
Labour hold		Swing		
Labour gain from Conservative		Swing		

=== Charlton Hornfair ===
Charlton Hornfair (2)
Party	Candidate	Votes	%	±%
Labour	Clare Burke-McDonald	1,744	66.2	
Labour	Lakshan Saldin	1,528	58.0	
Green	Ann Brown	547	20.8	
Conservative	Rupert Fiennes	486	18.4	
Conservative	Alan O'Kelly	453	17.2	
Green	Cole Pemberton	272	10.3	
Liberal Democrats	Sam Burridge	241	9.1	
Turnout			34.5	
Labour win (new seat)				
Labour win (new seat)				

=== Charlton Village and Riverside ===
Charlton Village and Riverside (2)
Party	Candidate	Votes	%	±%
Labour	Gary Dillon*	1,491	68.4	+6.8
Labour	Jo van den Broek	1,346	61.7	
Green	Clare Loops	427	19.6	−1.1
Green	Philip Connolly	355	16.3	
Conservative	Lucy Woodruff	303	13.9	
Conservative	James Worron	258	11.8	
Liberal Democrats	Stuart Watkin	182	8.3	
Turnout			33.2	
Labour win (new seat)				
Labour win (new seat)				

=== East Greenwich ===
East Greenwich (3)
Party	Candidate	Votes	%	±%
Labour	Maisie Richards Cottell	1,844	48.2	
Labour	Rowshan Hannan	1,825	47.7	
Labour	Majid Rahman	1,700	44.5	
Green	Stacy Smith	1,632	42.7	
Green	Matt Browne	1,557	40.7	
Green	Karin Tearle	1,462	38.2	
Conservative	Andrea Borbely	495	12.9	
Conservative	Andrew Bell	483	12.6	
Conservative	Elliot Whittingham	396	10.4	
Liberal Democrats	Rupert Wainwright	78	2.0	
Turnout			39.6	
Labour win (new seat)				
Labour win (new seat)				
Labour win (new seat)				

=== Eltham Page ===
Eltham Page (2)
Party	Candidate	Votes	%	±%
Labour	Sarah-Jane Merrill*	1,152	58.0	+0.1
Labour	Miranda Williams*	1,030	51.8	−3.1
Conservative	Phil Russel	544	27.4	
Conservative	Angie Begollari	541	27.2	
Green	Matt Stratford	265	13.3	
Britain First	Nicholas Scanlon	255	12.8	
Liberal Democrats	Matthew Huntbach	187	9.4	
Turnout			31.6	
Labour win (new seat)				
Labour win (new seat)				

=== Eltham Park and Progress ===
Eltham Park and Progress (2)
Party	Candidate	Votes	%	±%
Labour	Linda Bird*	1,959	53.1	
Labour	Simon Peirce	1,662	45.1	
Conservative	Charlie Davis*	1,479	40.1	
Conservative	Spencer Drury*	1,470	39.9	
Green	Luke Hawkins	480	13.0	
Liberal Democrats	Alistair Mills	228	6.2	
Reform	Wendy Beaumont	98	2.7	
Turnout			48.3	
Labour win (new seat)				
Labour win (new seat)				

=== Eltham Town and Avery Hill ===
Eltham Town and Avery Hill (3)
Party	Candidate	Votes	%	±%
Labour	Lauren Dingsdale	1,921	48.5	
Labour	Sammy Backon	1,870	47.2	
Conservative	Pat Greenwell*	1,763	44.5	
Conservative	Nigel Fletcher*	1,740	43.9	
Labour	Raja Zeeshan	1,678	42.3	
Conservative	Malcolm Reid	1,528	38.6	
Green	Mark Williams	573	14.5	
Liberal Democrats	Martha Parkhurst	340	8.6	
Liberal Democrats	Michael Chuter	312	7.9	
Reform	Tom Bright	164	4.1	
Turnout			38.1	
Labour win (new seat)				
Labour win (new seat)				
Conservative win (new seat)				

=== Greenwich Creekside ===
Greenwich Creekside (2)
Party	Candidate	Votes	%	±%
Labour	Majella Anning	1,463	66.8	
Labour	Calum O'Byrne Mulligan	1,224	55.9	
Green	Sem Longhurst	449	20.5	
Conservative	Ben Crompton	356	16.3	
Liberal Democrats	Victoria Harris	333	15.2	
Liberal Democrats	Anthony Austin	302	13.8	
Conservative	Christopher Swift	254	11.6	
Turnout			31.8	
Labour win (new seat)				
Labour win (new seat)				

=== Greenwich Park ===
Greenwich Park (2)
Party	Candidate	Votes	%	±%
Labour	Pat Slattery*	1,441	50.5	
Labour	Aidan Smith*	1,379	48.3	
Green	Hayley Jeffery	1,000	35.0	
Green	Mike Sixsmith	650	22.8	
Conservative	Daniel Smith	363	12.7	
Liberal Democrats	Rhian O'Connor	335	11.7	
Conservative	Ariadna Vilalta	328	11.5	
Liberal Democrats	Andrew Smith	216	7.6	
Turnout			39.7	
Labour win (new seat)				
Labour win (new seat)				

=== Greenwich Peninsula ===
Greenwich Peninsula (3)
Party	Candidate	Votes	%	±%
Labour	Denise Scott-McDonald*	1,080	54.6	
Labour	David Gardner*	1,047	52.9	
Labour	Nick Williams	959	48.4	
Green	Laura Sessions	371	18.7	
Green	Roger Bailey	323	16.3	
Conservative	James Cowling	321	16.2	
Conservative	Godwin Amaefula	321	16.2	
Liberal Democrats	Ulysse Abbate	312	15.8	
Liberal Democrats	Greg Mulligan	301	15.2	
Conservative	Anthonia Ugo	295	14.9	
Liberal Democrats	Richard Chamberlain	290	14.6	
Green	John Holmes	271	13.7	
Reform	Terry Wheeler	48	2.4	
Turnout			28.0	
Labour win (new seat)				
Labour win (new seat)				
Labour win (new seat)				

=== Kidbrooke Park ===
Kidbrooke Park (2)
Party	Candidate	Votes	%	±%
Labour	Odette McGahey*	1,284	62.2	
Labour	John Fahy*	1,270	61.5	
Conservative	Aileen Davis	571	27.7	
Conservative	Kerrymarie West	487	23.6	
Green	Alexander Pemberton	390	18.9	
Liberal Democrats	Donald Reid	218	10.6	
Reform	Sharon Kent	127	6.2	
Turnout			31.5	
Labour win (new seat)				
Labour win (new seat)				

=== Kidbrooke Village and Sutcliffe ===
Kidbrooke Village and Sutcliffe (2)
Party	Candidate	Votes	%	±%
Labour	Sandra Bauer*	865	70.5	
Labour	Dave Sullivan	655	53.4	
Green	Fiona Moore	290	23.6	
Conservative	Kate Drury	266	21.7	
Conservative	Lola Ojomola	209	17.0	
Liberal Democrats	Chris Milne	169	13.8	
Turnout			32.5	
Labour win (new seat)				
Labour win (new seat)				

=== Middle Park and Horn Park ===
Middle Park and Horn Park (2)
Party	Candidate	Votes	%	±%
Labour	Chris May	1,302	66.2	
Labour	Rachel Taggart-Ryan	1,242	63.1	
Conservative	David Banks	521	26.5	
Conservative	Rob Sayers	449	22.8	
Green	Pierre Davies	236	12.0	
Liberal Democrats	Mark Pattenden	184	9.4	
Turnout			31.5	
Labour win (new seat)				
Labour win (new seat)				

=== Mottingham, Coldharbour and New Eltham ===
Mottingham, Coldharbour and New Eltham (3)
Party	Candidate	Votes	%	±%
Labour	Cathy Dowse	1,916	49.9	
Conservative	Matt Hartley*	1,894	49.3	
Conservative	John Hills*	1,846	48.1	
Labour	Donald Austen	1,836	47.8	
Conservative	Roger Tester*	1,748	45.5	
Labour	Edward Jones	1,734	45.1	
Liberal Democrats	Paul Gentry	399	10.4	
Reform	Mark Simpson	149	3.9	
Turnout			38.2	
Labour win (new seat)				
Conservative win (new seat)				
Conservative win (new seat)				

=== Plumstead Common ===
Plumstead Common (3)
Party	Candidate	Votes	%	±%
Labour	Issy Cooke	2,194	67.7	
Labour	Nas Asghar	2,091	64.5	
Labour	Matt Morrow*	2,083	64.3	
Green	Leonie Barron	691	21.3	
Conservative	Ashley Foord	631	19.5	
Conservative	Jim Davis	617	19.0	
Conservative	Dave Robinson	581	17.9	
Green	Anji Petersen	493	15.2	
Liberal Democrats	Richard Shiel	338	10.4	
Turnout			32.4	
Labour win (new seat)				
Labour win (new seat)				
Labour win (new seat)				

=== Plumstead and Glyndon ===
Plumstead and Glyndon (3)
Party	Candidate	Votes	%	±%
Labour	Sandra Thomas	2,440	72.1	
Labour	Adel Khaireh*	2,415	71.4	
Labour	Jit Ranabhat	2,319	68.5	
Conservative	Michael Dowd	527	15.6	
Conservative	Alistair Green	482	14.2	
Green	Benjamin Oram	479	14.2	
Green	Duncan Platt	453	13.4	
Conservative	Kristian Turner	442	13.1	
Liberal Democrats	Millie Brown	364	10.8	
Liberal Democrats	Richard Smith	229	6.8	
Turnout			29.6	
Labour win (new seat)				
Labour win (new seat)				
Labour win (new seat)				

=== Shooters Hill ===
Shooters Hill (2)
Party	Candidate	Votes	%	±%
Labour	Danny Thorpe*	1,878	70.5	
Labour	Ivis Williams*	1,757	66.0	
Green	Tamasin Rhymes	475	17.8	
Conservative	Paul Butler	440	16.5	
Conservative	Christopher Anoty	413	15.5	
Liberal Democrats	Kirstie Shedden	275	10.3	
Reform	Ruth Handyside	89	3.3	
Turnout			35.7	
Labour hold		Swing		
Labour hold		Swing		

=== Thamesmead Moorings ===
Thamesmead Moorings (2)
Party	Candidate	Votes	%	±%
Labour	Olu Babatola*	1,323	77.3	
Labour	Averil Lekau*	1,242	72.5	
Conservative	Paul Drake	359	21.0	
Conservative	Peter Nutting	311	18.2	
Liberal Democrats	Judy Spence	190	11.1	
Turnout			23.6	
Labour hold		Swing		
Labour hold		Swing		

=== West Thamesmead ===
West Thamesmead (2)
Party	Candidate	Votes	%	±%
Labour	Chris Lloyd*	1,085	74.0	
Labour	Lade Olugbemi	967	66.0	
Green	Julie Adams	263	17.9	
Conservative	Jonathan Morris	259	17.7	
Conservative	Colin Podmore	210	14.3	
Liberal Democrats	Suzanne Miller	148	10.1	
Turnout			23.8	
Labour win (new seat)				
Labour win (new seat)				

=== Woolwich Arsenal ===
Woolwich Arsenal (3)
Party	Candidate	Votes	%	±%
Labour	Joshua Ayodele	1,571	69.3	
Labour	Sam Littlewood	1,540	67.9	
Labour	Jackie Smith*	1,538	67.8	
Green	Lindsay Evernden	606	26.7	
Liberal Democrats	Ramesh Perera-Delacourt	393	17.3	
Conservative	Pat Hills	339	15.0	
Conservative	Tania Wilkinson-Bewick	319	14.1	
Conservative	Marcelo Neves	304	13.4	
Independent	Philip Onwuachi	118	5.2	
Reform	Jimmy Wu	74	3.3	
Turnout			29.2	
Labour win (new seat)				
Labour win (new seat)				
Labour win (new seat)				

=== Woolwich Common ===
Woolwich Common (2)
Party	Candidate	Votes	%	±%
Labour	Elizabeth Ige	1,486	79.3	
Labour	Anthony Okereke*	1,350	72.0	
Conservative	Elaine Pooke	326	17.4	
Conservative	Mike Rafferty	299	16.0	
Liberal Democrats	Matthew Glinsman	288	15.4	
Turnout			24.8	
Labour hold		Swing		
Labour hold		Swing		

=== Woolwich Dockyard ===
Woolwich Dockyard (2)
Party	Candidate	Votes	%	±%
Labour	Dominic Mbang*	1,495	72.7	
Labour	Asli Mohammed	1,422	69.1	
Conservative	Simon Gallie	373	18.1	
Conservative	David Chunu	331	16.1	
Liberal Democrats	Nichola Martin	261	12.7	
Liberal Democrats	Matthew Rose	231	11.2	
Turnout			29.0	
Labour win (new seat)				
Labour win (new seat)				

== Changes 2022–2026 ==
=== Affiliation changes ===
- Majella Anning, elected for Labour, resigned from the party in March 2025 to sit as an independent in opposition to the governments proposed cuts to disability benefits and winter fuel payments.

=== By-elections ===
==== Mottingham, Coldharbour & New Eltham by-election ====
The by-election was triggered following the death of Cllr John Hills.

Mottingham, Coldharbour & New Eltham: 13 June 2024
Party	Candidate	Votes	%	±%
Conservative	Roger Tester	1,359	47.1	+3.6
Labour	Nikki Thurlow	1,101	38.2	–5.8
Reform	Mark Simpson	232	8.0	+4.6
Green	Matt Stratford	101	3.5	N/A
Liberal Democrats	Ulysse Abbate	90	3.1	–6.1
Majority		258	8.9	N/A
Turnout		2,888	27.3	–4.2
Registered electors		10,564		
Conservative hold		Swing	▲4.7	

==== Eltham Town & Avery Hill by-election ====
The by-election was triggered after the resignation of Cllr Sammy Backon due to taking a new job outside of London.

Eltham Town & Avery Hill: 18 October 2024
Party	Candidate	Votes	%	±%
Conservative	Charlie Davis	1,522	48.8	+12.1
Labour	Chris McGurk	981	31.5	–9.1
Reform	Ruth Handyside	290	9.3	+5.8
Liberal Democrats	Kieran Edwards	132	4.2	−2.9
Green	Mark Williams	123	3.9	–8.1
Independent	Arnold Tarling	69	2.2	N/A
Majority		541	17.3	N/A
Turnout		3,121	28.0	–10.1
Registered electors		11,166		
Conservative gain from Labour		Swing	▲10.6	

==== 2024 Shooters Hill by-election ====
The by-election was triggered due to the resignation of former council leader Cllr Danny Thorpe.

Shooters Hill: 14 November 2024
Party	Candidate	Votes	%	±%
Labour	Raja Zeeshan	1,043	57.9	−1.6
Conservative	Ezra Aydin	237	13.2	–0.8
Green	Tamasin Rhymes	185	10.3	−4.8
Reform	Alan Cecil	179	9.9	+7.1
Liberal Democrats	Kristie Shedden	158	8.8	+0.1
Majority		806	44.5	N/A
Turnout		1,811	22.5	–13.2
Registered electors		8,045		
Labour hold		Swing	▼1.2	

==== West Thamesmead by-election ====
The by-election was triggered after Cllr Lloyd resigned on moving to Wales.

West Thamesmead: 19 December 2024
Party	Candidate	Votes	%	±%
Labour	Jahdia Spencer	464	45.1	−16.7
Liberal Democrats	Steve Day	336	32.7	+24.2
Reform	Ruth Handyside	92	8.9	N/A
Conservative	Siama Qadar	82	8.0	−6.8
Green	Anji Petersen	55	3.9	−9.6
Majority		128	12.4	N/A
Turnout		1,032	14.9	–8.9
Registered electors		6,557		
Labour hold		Swing	▼20.5	

==== 2025 Shooters Hill by-election ====
The by-election took place on 26 June 2025, following the resignation of Ivis Williams.

2025 Shooters Hill by-election
Party	Candidate	Votes	%	±%
Green	Tamasin Rhymes	869	34.6	+24.3
Labour	Jummy Dawodu	756	30.1	−27.8
Reform	Paul Banks	402	16.0	+6.1
Conservative	Tim Waters	288	11.5	−1.7
Liberal Democrats	Kirstie Shedden	128	5.1	−3.7
Independent	Nazia Tingay	57	2.3	New
Independent	Arnold Tarling	9	0.4	New
Turnout		2,506	32.6	
Green gain from Labour		Swing		
