= West Thamesmead =

- Electoral ward for the Greenwich London Borough Council
- West Thamesmead ward boundaries since 2022
- Borough: Greenwich
- County: Greater London
- Population: 11,815 (2021) (Note: 2021 Census data reported for 2022 ward boundaries)
- Electorate: 6,557 (2022)
- Area: 2.180 square kilometres (0.842 sq mi)

Current electoral ward
- Created: 2022
- Number of members: 2
- Councillors: Lade Olugbemi; Jahdia Spencer
- Created from: Glyndon, Thamesmead Moorings
- GSS code: E05014091

West Thamesmead is an electoral ward in the Royal Borough of Greenwich. The ward was first used in the 2022 elections. It returns two councillors to Greenwich London Borough Council.

== List of councillors ==
Term	Councillor	Party
2022–2024	Chris Lloyd (Note: Chris Lloyd changed parties in 2023 and 2024)	Labour
2022–2024	Chris Lloyd	Independent
2022–2024	Chris Lloyd	Liberal Democrats
2022–present	Lade Olugbemi	Labour
2024–present	Jahdia Spencer	Labour

== Greenwich council elections ==
=== 2024 by-election ===
The by-election was held on 19 December 2024, following the resignation of Chris Lloyd.

2024 West Thamesmead by-election
Party	Candidate	Votes	%	±%
Labour	Jahdia Spencer	464		
Liberal Democrats	Steve Day	336		
Reform	Ruth Handyside	92		
Conservative	Siama Qadar	82		
Green	Anji Petersen	55		
Turnout				
Labour hold		Swing		

=== 2022 election ===
The election took place on 5 May 2022.

2022 Greenwich London Borough Council election: West Thamesmead (2)
Party	Candidate	Votes	%	±%
Labour	Chris Lloyd	1,085	74.0	
Labour	Lade Olugbemi	967	66.0	
Green	Julie Adams	263	17.9	
Conservative	Jonathan Morris	259	17.7	
Conservative	Colin Podmore	210	14.3	
Liberal Democrats	Suzanne Miller	148	10.1	
Turnout			23.8	
Labour win (new seat)				
Labour win (new seat)				
