= Greenwich Park (ward) =

- Electoral ward for the Greenwich London Borough Council
- Greenwich Park ward boundaries since 2022
- Borough: Greenwich
- County: Greater London
- Population: 10,554 (2021) (Note: 2021 Census data reported for 2022 ward boundaries)
- Electorate: 7,314 (2022)
- Area: 2.047 square kilometres (0.790 sq mi)

Current electoral ward
- Created: 2022
- Number of members: 2
- Councillors: Stacy Smith; Karin Tearle
- Created from: Greenwich West
- GSS code: E05014081

Greenwich Park is an electoral ward in the Royal Borough of Greenwich. The ward was first used in the 2022 elections. It returns two councillors to Greenwich London Borough Council.

== Councillors ==
Election	Councillors	
2022	Pat Slattery (Labour)	Aidan Smith (Labour)
2026	Stacy Smith (Green Party)	Karin Tearle (Green Party)

== Greenwich council elections ==
=== 2026 election ===
The election took place on 7 May 2026.

2026 Greenwich London Borough Council election: Greenwich Park (2)
Party	Candidate	Votes	%	±%
Green	Stacy Smith	1,514	21.1	
Green	Karin Tearle	1,330	18.6	
Labour	Jen Davis	1,238	17.3	
Labour	Aidan Smith	1,191	16.6	
Reform	James Keith Reynolds	358	5.0	
Conservative	Andrew Bell	344	4.8	
Reform	Keith Barry Scholefield	338	4.7	
Conservative	Alistair Green	329	4.6	
Liberal Democrats	Victoria Harris	306	4.3	
Liberal Democrats	Andrew Smith	221	3.1	
Turnout		7,168	49.3	9.6
Swing to Green from Labour		Swing		
Swing to Green from Labour		Swing		

=== 2022 election ===
The election took place on 5 May 2022.

2022 Greenwich London Borough Council election: Greenwich Park (2)
Party	Candidate	Votes	%	±%
Labour	Pat Slattery	1,441	50.5	
Labour	Aidan Smith	1,379	48.3	
Green	Hayley Jeffery	1,000	35.0	
Green	Mike Sixsmith	650	22.8	
Conservative	Daniel Smith	363	12.7	
Liberal Democrats	Rhian O'Connor	335	11.7	
Conservative	Ariadna Vilalta	328	11.5	
Liberal Democrats	Andrew Charles Smith	216	7.6	
Turnout			39.7	
Labour win (new seat)				
Labour win (new seat)				
