= Greenwich Peninsula (ward) =

Electoral ward in London, England

- Electoral ward for the Greenwich London Borough Council
- Greenwich Peninsula ward boundaries since 2022
- Borough: Greenwich
- County: Greater London
- Population: 11,417 (2021) (Note: 2021 Census data reported for 2022 ward boundaries)
- Electorate: 7,343 (2022)
- Major settlements: Greenwich Peninsula
- Area: 2.251 square kilometres (0.869 sq mi)

Current electoral ward
- Created: 2022
- Number of members: 3
- Councillors: Austin McGrath; Claire Selby; Denise Scott-McDonald
- Created from: Peninsula
- GSS code: E05014082

Greenwich Peninsula is an electoral ward in the Royal Borough of Greenwich. The ward was first used in the 2022 elections. It returns three councillors to Greenwich London Borough Council.

== Councillors ==
Election	Councillors		
2022	David Gardner (Labour)	Nick Williams (Labour)	Denise Scott-McDonald (Labour)
2026	Austin McGratg (Green Party)	Claire Selby (Green Party)	Denise Scott-McDonald (Labour)

== Greenwich council elections ==
=== 2026 election ===
2026 Greenwich London Borough Council election: Greenwich Peninsula (3 seats)
Party	Candidate	Votes	%	±%
Green	Austin McGrath	982		
Green	Claire Selby	955		
Labour	Denise Scott-McDonald	924		
Green	Kit Tinkler	861		
Labour	Rob Stebbings	793		
Labour	Nick Williams	790		
Conservative	Jennifer Roberts	397		
Conservative	Michael Hoskin	392		
Conservative	Martin Seiffarth	337		
Reform	Anna Farra	326		
Liberal Democrats	Richard Chamberlain	309		
Reform	Alan Williams	301		
Reform	Catalin Protea	288		
Liberal Democrats	Jack Sellick	267		
Liberal Democrats	Tim West	243		

=== 2022 election ===
The election took place on 5 May 2022.

2022 Greenwich London Borough Council election: Greenwich Peninsula (3)
Party	Candidate	Votes	%	±%
Labour	Denise Scott-McDonald	1,080	54.6	
Labour	David Gardner	1,047	52.9	
Labour	Nick Williams	959	48.4	
Green	Laura Sessions	371	18.7	
Green	Roger Bailey	323	16.3	
Conservative	James Cowling	321	16.2	
Conservative	Godwin Amaefula	321	16.2	
Liberal Democrats	Ulysse Abbate	312	15.8	
Liberal Democrats	Greg Mulligan	301	15.2	
Conservative	Anthonia Ugo	295	14.9	
Liberal Democrats	Richard Chamberlain	290	14.6	
Green	John Holmes	271	13.7	
Reform	Terry Wheeler	48	2.4	
Turnout			28.0	
Labour win (new seat)				
Labour win (new seat)				
Labour win (new seat)				
