= Mottingham, Coldharbour and New Eltham =

- Electoral ward for the Greenwich London Borough Council
- Mottingham, Coldharbour and New Eltham ward boundaries since 2022
- Borough: Greenwich
- County: Greater London
- Population: 14,532 (2021) (Note: 2021 Census data reported for 2022 ward boundaries)
- Electorate: 10,466 (2022)
- Area: 3.044 square kilometres (1.175 sq mi)

Current electoral ward
- Created: 2022
- Number of members: 3
- Councillors: Matt Hartley; Roger Tester; Luke Warren
- GSS code: E05014086

Mottingham, Coldharbour and New Eltham is an electoral ward in the Royal Borough of Greenwich. The ward was first used in the 2022 elections. It returns three councillors to Greenwich London Borough Council.

== List of councillors ==
Term	Councillor	Party
2022–2026	Cathy Dowse	Labour
2022–present	Matt Hartley	Conservative
2022–2024	John Hills	Conservative
2024–present	Roger Tester	Conservative
2026–present	Luke Warren	Conservative

== Greenwich council elections ==
=== 2026 election ===
Mottingham, Coldharbour and New Eltham (3 seats)
Party	Candidate	Votes	%	±%
Conservative	Matt Hartley	1,903		
Conservative	Roger Tester	1,833		
Conservative	Luke Warren	1,696		
Reform	Tom Bright	1228		
Reform	Charles Case	1178		
Labour	Tom Fielder	1091		
Reform	Clara Rapley	1074		
Labour	Angela Josiah	1042		
Labour	Curtis Rulton	900		
Green	Judy Delap	643		
Green	Alex Pemberton	601		
Green	Victoria Rance	594		
Liberal Democrats	Paul Gentry	172		
Liberal Democrats	Judy Spence	156		

=== 2024 by-election ===
The by-election took place on 13 June 2024, following the death of John Hills.

2024 Mottingham, Coldharbour and New Eltham by-election
Party	Candidate	Votes	%	±%
Conservative	Roger Tester	1,359		
Labour	Nikki Thurlow	1,101		
Reform	Mark Simpson	232		
Green	Matt Stratford	101		
Liberal Democrats	Ulysse Abbate	90		
Turnout				
Conservative hold		Swing		

=== 2022 election ===
The election took place on 5 May 2022.

2022 Greenwich London Borough Council election: Mottingham, Coldharbour and New Eltham
Party	Candidate	Votes	%	±%
Labour	Cathy Dowse	1,916	49.9	
Conservative	Matt Hartley	1,894	49.3	
Conservative	John Hills	1,846	48.1	
Labour	Donald Austen	1,836	47.8	
Conservative	Roger Tester	1,748	45.5	
Labour	Edward Jones	1,734	45.1	
Liberal Democrats	Paul Graeme Gentry	399	10.4	
Reform	Mark Simpson	149	3.9	
Turnout			38.2	
Labour win (new seat)				
Conservative win (new seat)				
Conservative win (new seat)				
