= Eltham Page =

- Electoral ward for the Greenwich London Borough Council
- Eltham Page ward boundaries since 2022
- Borough: Greenwich
- County: Greater London
- Population: 9,752 (2021) (Note: 2021 Census data reported for 2022 ward boundaries)
- Electorate: 6,724 (2022)
- Area: 1.529 square kilometres (0.590 sq mi)

Current electoral ward
- Created: 2022
- Number of members: 2
- Councillors: Paul Banks; Jane Dickenson
- Created from: Eltham North, Eltham West, Middle Park and Sutcliffe
- GSS code: E05014077

Eltham Page is an electoral ward in the Royal Borough of Greenwich. The ward was first used in the 2022 elections. It returns two councillors to Greenwich London Borough Council.

== List of councillors ==
Seat	Councillor	Took office	Left office	Party	Election
1	Sarah-Jane Merrill	2022	2026	Labour	2022
2	Miranda Williams	2022	2026	Labour	2022
1	Paul Banks	2026	Incumbent	Reform	2026
2	Jane Dickenson	2026	Incumbent	Labour	2026

== Greenwich council elections ==
=== 2026 election ===
The election took place on 7 May 2026

2026 Greenwich London Borough Council election: Eltham Page
Party	Candidate	Votes	%	±%
Reform	Paul Banks	940		
Labour	Jane Dickenson	912		
Labour	Chris May	797		
Reform	Siama Qadar	790		
Green	Colin James	465		
Green	Robert Ramcharan	400		
Conservative	Spencer Drury	380		
Conservative	Phil Russell	303		
Liberal Democrats	Alistair Mills	124		
Liberal Democrats	Elliot Shubert	98		
Turnout		5209	40.5	+8.9
Reform gain from Labour		Swing		
Labour hold		Swing		

=== 2022 election ===
The election took place on 5 May 2022.

2022 Greenwich London Borough Council election: Eltham Page
Party	Candidate	Votes	%	±%
Labour	Sarah-Jane Merrill	1,152	58.0	+0.1
Labour	Miranda Williams	1,030	51.8	−3.1
Conservative	Phil Russel	544	27.4	
Conservative	Angie Begollari	541	27.2	
Green	Matt Stratford	265	13.3	
Britain First	Nicholas Scanlon	255	12.8	
Liberal Democrats	Matthew Huntbach	187	9.4	
Turnout			31.6	
Labour win (new seat)				
Labour win (new seat)				
