= Charlton Village and Riverside =

Electoral ward in Greater London, England

- Electoral ward for the Greenwich London Borough Council
- Charlton Village and Riverside ward boundaries since 2022
- Borough: Greenwich
- County: Greater London
- Population: 10,516 (2021) (Note: 2021 Census data reported for 2022 ward boundaries)
- Electorate: 6,856 (2022)
- Area: 2.063 square kilometres (0.797 sq mi)

Current electoral ward
- Created: 2022
- Number of members: 2
- Councillors: Gary Dillon; Jo van den Broek
- Created from: Charlton, Peninsula, Woolwich Riverside
- GSS code: E05014075

Charlton Village and Riverside is an electoral ward in the Royal Borough of Greenwich. The ward was first used in the 2022 elections. It returns two councillors to Greenwich London Borough Council.

== List of councillors ==
Term	Councillor	Party
2022–present	Gary Dillon	Labour
2022–present	Jo van den Broek	Labour

== Greenwich council elections ==
=== 2022 election ===
The election took place on 5 May 2022.

2022 Greenwich London Borough Council election: Charlton Village and Riverside (2)
Party	Candidate	Votes	%	±%
Labour	Gary Dillon	1,491	68.4	+6.8
Labour	Jo van den Broek	1,346	61.7	
Green	Clare Loops	427	19.6	−1.1
Green	Philip Connolly	355	16.3	
Conservative	Lucy Woodruff	303	13.9	
Conservative	James Worron	258	11.8	
Liberal Democrats	Stuart Watkin	182	8.3	
Turnout			33.2	
Labour win (new seat)				
Labour win (new seat)				
