= Eltham Park and Progress =

Electoral ward in London, England

- Electoral ward for the Greenwich London Borough Council
- Eltham Park and Progress ward boundaries since 2022
- Borough: Greenwich
- County: Greater London
- Population: 10,766 (2021) (Note: 2021 Census data reported for 2022 ward boundaries)
- Electorate: 7,864 (2022)
- Area: 1.898 square kilometres (0.733 sq mi)

Current electoral ward
- Created: 2022
- Number of members: 2
- Councillors: Linda Bird; Simon Peirce
- Created from: Eltham North, Eltham West, Shooters Hill
- GSS code: E05014078

Eltham Park and Progress is an electoral ward in the Royal Borough of Greenwich. The ward was first used in the 2022 elections. It returns two councillors to Greenwich London Borough Council.

== List of councillors ==
Term	Councillor	Party
2022–present	Linda Bird	Labour
2022–present	Simon Peirce	Labour

== Greenwich council elections ==
=== 2022 election ===
The election took place on 5 May 2022.

2022 Greenwich London Borough Council election: Eltham Park and Progress (2)
Party	Candidate	Votes	%	±%
Labour	Linda Bird	1,959	53.1	
Labour	Simon Peirce	1,662	45.1	
Conservative	Charlie Davis	1,479	40.1	
Conservative	Spencer Drury	1,470	39.9	
Green	Luke Hawkins	480	13.0	
Liberal Democrats	Alistair Mills	228	6.2	
Reform	Wendy Beaumont	98	2.7	
Turnout			48.3	
Labour win (new seat)				
Labour win (new seat)				
