= Plumstead and Glyndon =

- Electoral ward for the Greenwich London Borough Council
- Plumstead and Glyndon ward boundaries since 2022
- Borough: Greenwich
- County: Greater London
- Population: 21,971 (2021) (Note: 2021 Census data reported for 2022 ward boundaries)
- Electorate: 12,145 (2022)
- Area: 1.931 square kilometres (0.746 sq mi)

Current electoral ward
- Created: 2022
- Number of members: 3
- Councillors: Sandra Thomas; Adel Khaireh; Jit Ranabhat
- Created from: Glyndon, Plumstead
- GSS code: E05014087

Plumstead and Glyndon is an electoral ward in the Royal Borough of Greenwich. The ward was first used in the 2022 elections. It returns three councillors to Greenwich London Borough Council.

== List of councillors ==
Term	Councillor	Party
2026–present	Tammy Aghedo	Labour
2022–present	Adel Khaireh	Labour
2022–present	Jit Ranabhat	Labour

== Greenwich council elections ==
=== 2022 election ===
The election took place on 5 May 2022.

2022 Greenwich London Borough Council election: Plumstead and Glyndon (3)
Party	Candidate	Votes	%	±%
Labour	Sandra Thomas	2,440	72.1	
Labour	Adel Khaireh	2,415	71.4	
Labour	Jit Ranabhat	2,319	68.5	
Conservative	Michael Dowd	527	15.6	
Conservative	Alistair Green	482	14.2	
Green	Benjamin Oram	479	14.2	
Green	Duncan Platt	453	13.4	
Conservative	Kristian Turner	442	13.1	
Liberal Democrats	Millie Brown	364	10.8	
Liberal Democrats	Richard Smith	229	6.8	
Turnout			29.6	
Labour win (new seat)				
Labour win (new seat)				
Labour win (new seat)				
