= Middle Park and Horn Park =

- Electoral ward for the Greenwich London Borough Council
- Middle Park and Horn Park ward boundaries since 2022
- Borough: Greenwich
- County: Greater London
- Population: 9,517 (2021) (Note: 2021 Census data reported for 2022 ward boundaries)
- Electorate: 6,520 (2022)
- Area: 2.101 square kilometres (0.811 sq mi)

Current electoral ward
- Created: 2022
- Number of members: 2
- Councillors: Chris May; Rachel Taggart-Ryan
- Created from: Eltham South, Middle Park and Sutcliffe
- GSS code: E05014085

Middle Park and Horn Park is an electoral ward in the Royal Borough of Greenwich. The ward was first used in the 2022 elections. It returns two councillors to Greenwich London Borough Council.

== List of councillors ==
Term	Councillor	Party
2022–present	Chris May	Labour
2022–present	Rachel Taggart-Ryan	Labour

== Greenwich council elections ==
=== 2022 election ===
The election took place on 5 May 2022.

2022 Greenwich London Borough Council election: Middle Park and Horn Park (2)
Party	Candidate	Votes	%	±%
Labour	Chris May	1,302	66.2	
Labour	Rachel Taggart-Ryan	1,242	63.1	
Conservative	David Banks	521	26.5	
Conservative	Rob Sayers	449	22.8	
Green	Pierre Davies	236	12.0	
Liberal Democrats	Mark Pattenden	184	9.4	
Turnout			31.5	
Labour win (new seat)				
Labour win (new seat)				
