= Kidbrooke Village and Sutcliffe =

- Electoral ward for the Greenwich London Borough Council
- Kidbrooke Village and Sutcliffe ward boundaries since 2022
- Borough: Greenwich
- County: Greater London
- Population: 6,105 (2021) (Note: 2021 Census data reported for 2022 ward boundaries)
- Electorate: 3,971 (2022)
- Area: 1.273 square kilometres (0.492 sq mi)

Current electoral ward
- Created: 2022
- Number of members: 2
- Councillors: Sandra Bauer; Dave Sullivan
- Created from: Eltham West, Middle Park and Sutcliffe
- GSS code: E05014084

Kidbrooke Village and Sutcliffe is an electoral ward in the Royal Borough of Greenwich. The ward was first used in the 2022 elections. It returns two councillors to Greenwich London Borough Council.

== List of councillors ==
Term	Councillor	Party
2022–present	Sandra Bauer	Labour
2022–present	Dave Sullivan	Labour

== Greenwich council elections ==
=== 2022 election ===
The election took place on 5 May 2022.

2022 Greenwich London Borough Council election: Kidbrooke Village and Sutcliffe (2)
Party	Candidate	Votes	%	±%
Labour	Sandra Bauer	865	70.5	
Labour	Dave Sullivan	655	53.4	
Green	Fiona Moore	290	23.6	
Conservative	Kate Drury	266	21.7	
Conservative	Lola Ojomola	209	17.0	
Liberal Democrats	Chris Milne	169	13.8	
Turnout			32.5	
Labour win (new seat)				
Labour win (new seat)				
