= Kidbrooke Park (ward) =

- Electoral ward for the Greenwich London Borough Council
- Kidbrooke Park ward boundaries since 2022
- Borough: Greenwich
- County: Greater London
- Population: 10,089 (2021) (Note: 2021 Census data reported for 2022 ward boundaries)
- Electorate: 7,233 (2022)
- Area: 1.825 square kilometres (0.705 sq mi)

Current electoral ward
- Created: 2022
- Number of members: 2
- Councillors: Odette McGahey; John Fahy
- Created from: Eltham West, Kidbrooke with Hornfair
- GSS code: E05014083

Kidbrooke Park is an electoral ward in the Royal Borough of Greenwich. The ward was first used in the 2022 elections. It returns two councillors to Greenwich London Borough Council.

== List of councillors ==
Term	Councillor	Party
2022–present	Odette McGahey	Labour
2022–present	John Fahy	Labour

== Greenwich council elections ==
=== 2022 election ===
The election took place on 5 May 2022.

2022 Greenwich London Borough Council election: Kidbrooke Park (2)
Party	Candidate	Votes	%	±%
Labour	Odette McGahey	1,284	62.2	
Labour	John Fahy	1,270	61.5	
Conservative	Aileen Davis	571	27.7	
Conservative	Kerrymarie West	487	23.6	
Green	Alexander Pemberton	390	18.9	
Liberal Democrats	Donald Reid	218	10.6	
Reform UK	Sharon Kent	127	6.2	
Turnout			31.5	
Labour win (new seat)				
Labour win (new seat)				
