= Eltham Town and Avery Hill =

- Electoral ward for the Greenwich London Borough Council
- Eltham Town and Avery Hill ward boundaries since 2022
- Borough: Greenwich
- County: Greater London
- Population: 15,535 (2021) (Note: 2021 Census data reported for 2022 ward boundaries)
- Electorate: 10,904 (2022)
- Area: 5.012 square kilometres (1.935 sq mi)

Current electoral ward
- Created: 2022
- Number of members: 3
- Councillors: Lauren Dingsdale; Pat Greenwell; Charlie Davis
- Created from: Eltham North, Eltham South
- GSS code: E05014079

Eltham Town and Avery Hill is an electoral ward in the Royal Borough of Greenwich. The ward was first used in the 2022 elections. It returns three councillors to Greenwich London Borough Council.

== List of councillors ==
Term	Councillor	Party
2022–present	Lauren Dingsdale	Labour
2022–2024	Sammy Backon	Labour
2022–present	Pat Greenwell	Conservative
2024–present	Charlie Davis	Conservative

== Greenwich council elections ==
=== 2024 by-election ===
The by-election took place on 17 October 2024, following the resignation of Sammy Backon.

2024 Eltham Town and Avery Hill by-election
Party	Candidate	Votes	%	±%
Conservative	Charlie Davis	1,522		
Labour	Chris McGurk	981		
Reform	Ruth Handyside	290		
Liberal Democrats	Kieran Edwards	132		
Green	Mark Williams	123		
Independent	Arnold Tarling	70		
Turnout				
Conservative gain from Labour		Swing		

=== 2022 election ===
The election took place on 5 May 2022.

2022 Greenwich London Borough Council election: Eltham Town and Avery Hill (3)
Party	Candidate	Votes	%	±%
Labour	Lauren Dingsdale	1,921	48.5	
Labour	Sammy Backon	1,870	47.2	
Conservative	Pat Greenwell	1,763	44.5	
Conservative	Nigel Fletcher	1,740	43.9	
Labour	Raja Zeeshan	1,678	42.3	
Conservative	Malcolm Reid	1,528	38.6	
Green	Mark Williams	573	14.5	
Liberal Democrats	Martha Parkhurst	340	8.6	
Liberal Democrats	Michael Chuter	312	7.9	
Reform	Tom Bright	164	4.1	
Turnout			38.1	
Labour win (new seat)				
Labour win (new seat)				
Conservative win (new seat)				
