= Woolwich Dockyard (ward) =

- Electoral ward for the Greenwich London Borough Council
- Woolwich Dockyard ward boundaries since 2022
- Borough: Greenwich
- County: Greater London
- Population: 11,688 (2021) (Note: 2021 Census data reported for 2022 ward boundaries)
- Electorate: 7,385 (2022)
- Area: 0.9793 square kilometres (0.3781 sq mi)

Current electoral ward
- Created: 2022
- Number of members: 2
- Councillors: Dominic Mbang; Asli Mohammed
- Created from: Woolwich Riverside
- GSS code: E05014092

Woolwich Dockyard is an electoral ward in the Royal Borough of Greenwich. The ward was first used in the 2022 elections. It returns two councillors to Greenwich London Borough Council.

== List of councillors ==
Term	Councillor	Party
2022–present	Dominic Mbang	Labour
2022–present	Asli Mohammed	Labour

== Greenwich council elections ==
=== 2022 election ===
The election took place on 5 May 2022.

2022 Greenwich London Borough Council election: Woolwich Dockyard (2)
Party	Candidate	Votes	%	±%
Labour	Dominic Mbang	1,495	72.7	
Labour	Asli Mohammed	1,422	69.1	
Conservative	Simon Gallie	373	18.1	
Conservative	David Chunu	331	16.1	
Liberal Democrats	Nichola Martin	261	12.7	
Liberal Democrats	Matthew Rose	231	11.2	
Turnout			29.0	
Labour win (new seat)				
Labour win (new seat)				
