= Greenwich Creekside =

- Electoral ward for the Greenwich London Borough Council
- Greenwich Creekside ward boundaries since 2022
- Borough: Greenwich
- County: Greater London
- Population: 10,999 (2021) (Note: 2021 Census data reported for 2022 ward boundaries)
- Electorate: 7,190 (2022)
- Area: 0.4881 square kilometres (0.1885 sq mi)

Current electoral ward
- Created: 2022
- Number of members: 2
- Councillors: Majella Anning; Calum O'Byrne Mulligan
- Created from: Greenwich West
- GSS code: E05014080

Greenwich Creekside is an electoral ward in the Royal Borough of Greenwich. The ward was first used in the 2022 elections. It returns two councillors to Greenwich London Borough Council.

== List of councillors ==
Term	Councillor	Party
2022–present	Majella Anning (Note: Majella Anning changed parties in 2025)	Labour
2022–present	Majella Anning	Independent
2022–present	Calum O'Byrne Mulligan	Labour

== Greenwich council elections ==
=== 2022 election ===
The election took place on 5 May 2022.

2022 Greenwich London Borough Council election: Greenwich Creekside (2)
Party	Candidate	Votes	%	±%
Labour	Majella Anning	1,463	66.8	
Labour	Calum O'Byrne Mulligan	1,224	55.9	
Green	Sem Longhurst	449	20.5	
Conservative	Ben Crompton	356	16.3	
Liberal Democrats	Victoria Harris	333	15.2	
Liberal Democrats	Anthony Austin	302	13.8	
Conservative	Christopher Swift	254	11.6	
Turnout			31.8	
Labour win (new seat)				
Labour win (new seat)				
