= Woolwich Arsenal (ward) =

Electoral ward in the Royal Borough of Greenwich, London, England, UK

- Electoral ward for the Greenwich London Borough Council
- Woolwich Arsenal ward boundaries since 2022
- Borough: Greenwich
- County: Greater London
- Population: 12,100 (2021) (Note: 2021 Census data reported for 2022 ward boundaries)
- Electorate: 8,371 (2022)
- Area: 0.9689 square kilometres (0.3741 sq mi)

Current electoral ward
- Created: 2022
- Number of members: 3
- Councillors: Joshua Ayodele; Sam Littlewood; Jackie Smith
- Created from: Glyndon, Woolwich Common, Woolwich Riverside
- GSS code: E05014092

Woolwich Arsenal is an electoral ward in the Royal Borough of Greenwich. The ward was first used in the 2022 elections. It returns three councillors to Greenwich London Borough Council.

== List of councillors ==
Term	Councillor	Party
2022–present	Joshua Ayodele	Labour
2022–present	Sam Littlewood	Labour
2022–present	Jackie Smith	Labour

== Greenwich council elections ==
=== 2022 election ===
The election took place on 5 May 2022.

2022 Greenwich London Borough Council election: Woolwich Arsenal (3)
Party	Candidate	Votes	%	±%
Labour	Joshua Ayodele	1,571	69.3	
Labour	Sam Littlewood	1,540	67.9	
Labour	Jackie Smith	1,538	67.8	
Green	Lindsay Evernden	606	26.7	
Liberal Democrats	Ramesh Perera-Delacourt	393	17.3	
Conservative	Pat Hills	339	15.0	
Conservative	Tania Wilkinson-Bewick	319	14.1	
Conservative	Marcelo Neves	304	13.4	
Independent	Philip Onwuachi	118	5.2	
Reform	Jimmy Wu	74	3.3	
Turnout			29.2	
Labour win (new seat)				
Labour win (new seat)				
Labour win (new seat)				
