= Mark Simpson (politician) =

Scottish politician

Mark Simpson MSP
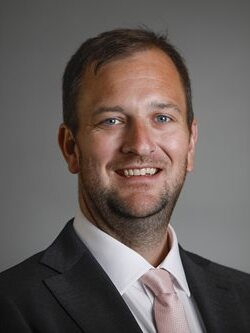
- Official Portrait, 2026

Member of the Scottish Parliament for North East Scotland (1 of 7 Regional MSPs)
- Incumbent
- Assumed office 7 May 2026

Personal details
- Party: Reform UK (2021-present) Brexit Party (2018-2021) UKIP (2008-2018)
- Website: www.parliament.scot/msps/current-and-previous-msps/mark-simpson

Mark Simpson is a Scottish politician who has served as a Member of the Scottish Parliament for North East Scotland since May 2026. He is a member of Reform UK Scotland.

== Biography ==
Simpson previously stood as a candidate in London. He stood in Eltham and Chislehurst in the 2024 United Kingdom general election, placing third.

He was elected on the regional list for North East Scotland in the 2026 Scottish Parliament election he received 4,135 votes (15.6%) placing third as the constituency candidate in Dundee City East.

In his maiden speech, Simpson thanked his supporters across Scotland and focused on promoting the oil & gas sector of the North East, moving away from Net-zero, reducing the tax burden on everyday Scottish people and tackling the nation-wide immigration issue.
