= Shooters Hill (ward) =

Electoral ward in Greenwich, London, England

- Electoral ward for the Greenwich London Borough Council
- Shooters Hill ward boundaries since 2022
- Borough: Greenwich
- County: Greater London
- Population: 11,891 (2021) (Note: 2021 Census data reported for 2022 ward boundaries)
- Electorate: 7,846 (2022)
- Area: 3.059 square kilometres (1.181 sq mi)

Current electoral ward
- Number of members: 1965–1978: 2; 2002–2022: 3; 2022–present: 2
- Councillors: Tamasin Rhymes; Max Green
- GSS code: E05014089

Shooters Hill is an electoral ward in the Royal Borough of Greenwich. The ward was originally created in 1965 and abolished in 1978. It was created again in 2002 and was revised in 2022. It returns councillors to Greenwich London Borough Council.

== Greenwich council elections since 2022 ==
There was a revision of ward boundaries in Greenwich in 2022. The number of councillors representing the ward was reduced from three to two.

=== 2026 Local Elections ===
The election took place on 7 May 2026.

2026 Greenwich London Borough Council election: Shooters Hill
Party	Candidate	Votes	%	±%
Green	Tamasin Rhymes	1,569	48%	
Green	Max Green	1,483	45.4%	
Labour	Timothy Folaranmi	968	29.6%	
Labour	Kim Sullivan	830	25.4%	
Reform	Steve Greenwood	475	14.6%	
Reform	Paul Walker	466	14.2%	
Conservative	Michael Dowd	275	8.4%	
Conservative	Sam Shuker	225	6.8%	
Liberal Democrats	Kirstie Shedden	141	4.4%	
Liberal Democrats	Valerie Stainton	108	3.4%	
Turnout			43.4	
Green gain from Labour		Swing		

=== 2025 by-election ===
The by-election took place on 26 June 2025, following the resignation of Ivis Williams.

2025 Shooters Hill by-election
Party	Candidate	Votes	%	±%
Green	Tamasin Rhymes	869	34.8	
Labour	Jummy Dawodu	756	30.2	
Reform	Paul Banks	402	16.1	
Conservative	Tim Waters	288	11.5	
Liberal Democrats	Kirstie Shedden	128	5.1	
Independent	Nazia Tingay	57	2.3	
Independent	Arnold Tarling	9	0.4	
Turnout			32.6	
Green gain from Labour		Swing		

=== 2024 by-election ===
The by-election took place on 14 November 2024, following the resignation of Danny Thorpe.

2024 Shooters Hill by-election
Party	Candidate	Votes	%	±%
Labour	Raja Zeeshan	1,043	57.9	
Conservative	Ezra Aydin	237	13.2	
Green	Tamasin Rhymes	185	10.3	
Reform	Alan Cecil	179	9.9	
Liberal Democrats	Kirstie Shedden	158	8.8	
Turnout			22.5	
Labour hold		Swing		

=== 2022 election ===
The election took place on 5 May 2022.

2022 Greenwich London Borough Council election: Shooters Hill (2)
Party	Candidate	Votes	%	±%
Labour	Danny Thorpe	1,878	70.5	
Labour	Ivis Williams	1,757	66.0	
Green	Tamasin Rhymes	475	17.8	
Conservative	Paul Butler	440	16.5	
Conservative	Christopher Anoty	413	15.5	
Liberal Democrats	Kirstie Shedden	275	10.3	
Reform	Ruth Handyside	89	3.3	
Turnout			35.7	
Labour win (new boundaries)				
Labour win (new boundaries)				

== 2002–2022 Greenwich council elections ==
Shooters Hill ward boundaries from 2002 to 2022

There was a revision of ward boundaries in Greenwich in 2002. Shooters Hill was recreated as a two member ward.

=== 2018 election ===
The election took place on 3 May 2018.

2018 Greenwich London Borough Council election: Shooters Hill (3)
Party	Candidate	Votes	%	±%
Labour Co-op	Chris Kirby	2,359	58.3	
Labour Co-op	Sarah Merrill	2,340	57.9	
Labour Co-op	Danny Thorpe	2,218	54.9	
Conservative	Maureen Burgess	712	17.6	
Conservative	Steve Adamson	697	17.2	
Conservative	David Runham	591	14.6	
The Plumstead Party	Laura Conwell-Tillotson	572	14.1	
Green	Ann Brown	491	12.1	
The Plumstead Party	John Nichols	465	11.5	
The Plumstead Party	Stuart Lyons	449	11.1	
Liberal Democrats	Heather Heiner	193	4.8	
Liberal Democrats	Richard Shiel	193	4.8	
Liberal Democrats	Jane Hermiston	174	4.3	
Turnout			41.33	
Labour Co-op hold		Swing		
Labour Co-op hold		Swing		
Labour Co-op hold		Swing		
