= Charlton Hornfair =

Electoral ward in Greater London, England

- Electoral ward for the Greenwich London Borough Council
- Charlton Hornfair ward boundaries since 2022
- Borough: Greenwich
- County: Greater London
- Population: 12,308 (2021) (Note: 2021 Census data reported for 2022 ward boundaries)
- Electorate: 7,886 (2022)
- Area: 1.437 square kilometres (0.555 sq mi)

Current electoral ward
- Created: 2022
- Number of members: 2
- Councillors: Clare Burke-McDonald; Lakshan Saldin
- Created from: Charlton, Kidbrooke with Hornfair
- GSS code: E05014074

Charlton Hornfair is an electoral ward in the Royal Borough of Greenwich. The ward was first used in the 2022 elections. It returns two councillors to Greenwich London Borough Council.

== List of councillors ==
| Term | Councillor | Party |
|---|---|---|
| 2022–present | Clare Burke-McDonald | Labour |
| 2022–present | Lakshan Saldin (Note: Lakshan Saldin changed parties in 2025 and 2026.) | Labour |
| 2022–present | Lakshan Saldin | Independent |
| 2022–present | Lakshan Saldin | Green |

== Greenwich council elections ==
=== 2022 election ===
The election took place on 5 May 2022.

2022 Greenwich London Borough Council election: Charlton Hornfair (2)
| Party | Candidate | Votes | % | ±% |
|---|---|---|---|---|
| Labour | Clare Burke-McDonald | 1,744 | 66.2 | |
| Labour | Lakshan Saldin | 1,528 | 58.0 | |
| Green | Ann Brown | 547 | 20.8 | |
| Conservative | Rupert Fiennes | 486 | 18.4 | |
| Conservative | Alan O'Kelly | 453 | 17.2 | |
| Green | Cole Pemberton | 272 | 10.3 | |
| Liberal Democrats | Sam Burridge | 241 | 9.1 | |
| Turnout | | | 34.5 | |
| Labour win (new seat) | | | | |
| Labour win (new seat) | | | | |
