= Blackheath Westcombe =

Electoral ward in the Greenwich, England

- Electoral ward for the Greenwich London Borough Council
- Borough: Greenwich
- County: Greater London
- Population: 15,035 (2021)
- Area: 2.722 km²

Current electoral ward
- Created: 2002
- Councillors: 3

Blackheath Westcombe is an electoral ward in the Royal Borough of Greenwich. The ward was first used in the 2002 elections. It returns three councillors to Greenwich London Borough Council.

== Geography ==
The ward is based on the areas of Blackheath and Westcombe Park.

== Councillors ==
Election	Councillors		
2022	Mariam Lolavar (Labour)	Leo Fletcher (Labour)	Christine St. Matthew-Daniel (Labour)

== Elections ==
=== 2022 Greenwich London Borough Council election ===
Blackheath Westcombe (3)
Party	Candidate	Votes	%	±%
Labour	Mariam Lolavar*	2,467	49.0	+5.6
Labour	Leo Fletcher*	2,372	47.1	+7.4
Labour	Christine St Matthew-Daniel	2,170	43.1	
Conservative	Geoff Brighty*	1,621	32.2	−6.4
Conservative	Daniel McGinley	1,245	24.7	
Conservative	Naveed Mughal	1,166	23.2	
Green	Victoria Rance	876	17.4	+8.3
Green	Christopher Edgar	672	13.4	
Green	Philip Malivoire	629	12.5	
Liberal Democrats	Lee Coppack	618	12.3	
Liberal Democrats	Pierce Chalmers	578	11.5	
Liberal Democrats	Roger Spence	477	9.5	
Monster Raving Loony	Trevor Allman	125	2.5	+0.2
Communist	Stewart McGill	79	1.6	
Turnout			46.4	
Labour hold		Swing		
Labour hold		Swing		
Labour gain from Conservative		Swing		
