= Greenwich London Borough Council =

Local authority in Greater London, England

Type
- Type: London borough council of the Royal Borough of Greenwich
- Houses: Unicameral

Leadership
- Mayor: David Gardner, Labour since 27 May 2026
- Leader: Anthony Okereke, Labour since 25 May 2022
- Chief Executive: Debbie Warren since 12 December 2018

Structure
- Seats: 55 councillors
- Political groups: Administration (35) Labour (35) Opposition (20) Green (13) Conservative (6) Reform UK (1)
- Length of term: Whole council elected every four years

Elections
- Voting system: Plurality at-large (FPTP)
- Last election: 7 May 2026
- Next election: 2 May 2030

Meeting place
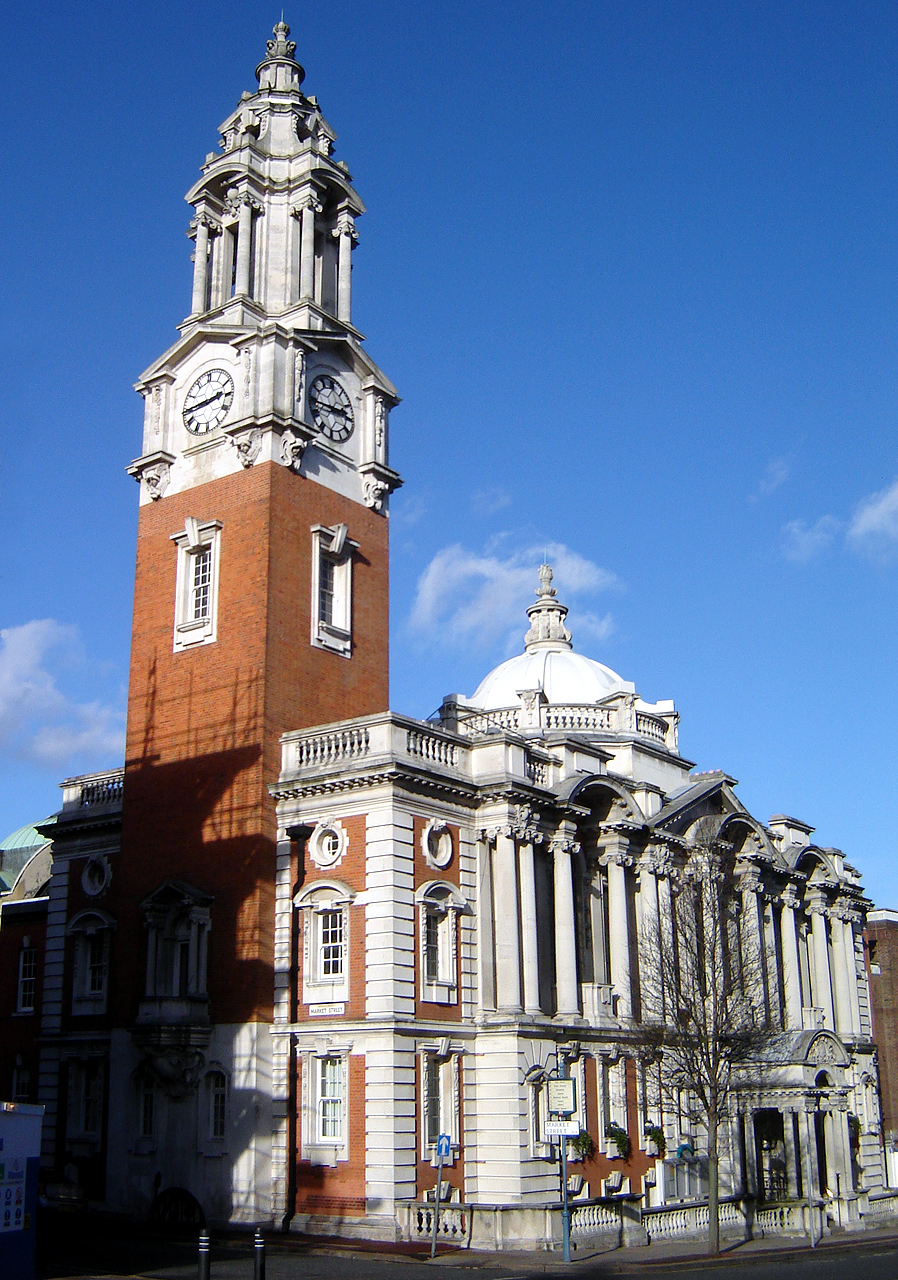
- Town Hall, Wellington Street, Woolwich, London, SE18 6PW

Website
- www.royalgreenwich.gov.uk

Greenwich London Borough Council, also known as Greenwich Council or the Council of the Royal Borough of Greenwich, is the local authority for the Royal Borough of Greenwich in Greater London, England. The council is responsible for providing a range of services within the borough. The council has been under Labour majority control since 1971. It meets at Woolwich Town Hall and has its main offices at the Woolwich Centre opposite.

== History ==
There has been a Greenwich local authority since 1856 when the Greenwich District was created, governed by an elected board. It was one of the lower tier authorities within the area of the Metropolitan Board of Works, which was established to provide services across the metropolis of London. In 1889 the Metropolitan Board of Works' area was made the County of London. In 1900 the lower tier was reorganised into metropolitan boroughs, each with a borough council, two of which were called Greenwich and Woolwich.

The London Borough of Greenwich and its council were created under the London Government Act 1963, with the first election held in 1964. For its first year the council acted as a shadow authority alongside the area's outgoing authorities, being the councils of the two metropolitan boroughs of Greenwich and Woolwich. The new council formally came into its powers on 1 April 1965, at which point the old boroughs and their councils were abolished.

From 1965 until 1986 the council was a lower-tier authority, with upper-tier functions provided by the Greater London Council. The split of powers and functions meant that the Greater London Council was responsible for "wide area" services such as fire, ambulance, flood prevention, and refuse disposal; with the boroughs (including Greenwich) responsible for "personal" services such as social care, libraries, cemeteries and refuse collection. The Greater London Council was abolished in 1986 and its functions passed to the London Boroughs, with some services provided through joint committees. Greenwich became a local education authority in 1990 when the Inner London Education Authority was dissolved.

Since 2000 the Greater London Authority has taken some responsibility for highways and planning control from the council, but within the English local government system the council remains a "most purpose" authority in terms of the available range of powers and functions.

In 2012 the borough was given the additional honorific status of being a royal borough. The council's full legal name since then has been "The Mayor and Burgesses of the Royal Borough of Greenwich".

In May 2014 the Labour-run council refused to support the building of a memorial to Lee Rigby, whose murder by Islamists occurred in the borough, in spite of being "overwhelmed by interest in a local memorial". The authority previously faced criticism at the time of the killing, with the cabinet attending an away day immediately after the murder, therefore missing a visit by the Prime Minister. Following a campaign which saw 25,000 people sign a petition in support of the memorial the council dropped its opposition to the tribute.

== Powers and functions ==
The local authority derives its powers and functions from the London Government Act 1963 and subsequent legislation, and has the powers and functions of a London borough council. It sets council tax and as a billing authority it also collects precepts for Greater London Authority functions and business rates. It sets planning policies which complement Greater London Authority and national policies, and decides on almost all planning applications accordingly. It is also the local education authority.

== Political control ==
The council has been under Labour majority control since 1971.

The first election was held in 1964, initially operating as a shadow authority alongside the outgoing authorities until it came into its powers on 1 April 1965. Political control of the council since 1965 has been as follows:

Party in control	Years
Labour	1965–1968
Conservative	1968–1971
Labour	1971–present

=== Leadership ===
The role of Mayor of Greenwich is largely ceremonial. Political leadership is instead provided by the leader of the council. The leaders since 1965 have been:

Councillor	Party	From	To
Ronald Stucke	Labour	1964	1966
Thomas Smith	Labour	1966	1968
William Manners	Conservative	1968	1969
Charles Miles	Conservative	1969	1971
John Cartwright	Labour	1971	1974
Arthur Capelin	Labour	1974	1982
John Austin	Labour	1982	1987
David Picton	Labour	1987	1989
Quentin Marsh	Labour	1989	1992
Len Duvall	Labour	1992	2000
Chris Roberts	Labour	2000	2014
Denise Hyland	Labour	May 2014	May 2018
Danny Thorpe	Labour	23 May 2018	25 May 2022
Anthony Okereke	Labour	25 May 2022	

=== Composition ===
Following the 2026 election the composition of the council was as follows:

Party	Councillors
Labour	35
Green	13
Conservative	6
Reform	1
Total	55

The next election is due in May 2030.

== Elections ==
Since the last boundary changes in 2022 the council has comprised 55 councillors representing 23 wards, with each ward electing two or three councillors. Elections are held every four years.

== Wards ==
The wards of Greenwich and the number of seats:

1. Abbey Wood (3)
2. Blackheath Westcombe (3)
3. Charlton Hornfair (2)
4. Charlton Village & Riverside (2)
5. East Greenwich (3)
6. Eltham Page (2)
7. Eltham Park & Progress (2)
8. Eltham Town & Avery Hill (3)
9. Greenwich Creekside (2)
10. Greenwich Park (2)
11. Greenwich Peninsula (3)
12. Kidbrooke Park (2)
13. Kidbrooke Village & Sutcliffe (2)
14. Middle Park & Horn Park (2)
15. Mottingham, Coldharbour & New Eltham (3)
16. Plumstead & Glyndon (3)
17. Plumstead Common (3)
18. Shooters Hill (2)
19. Thamesmead Moorings (2)
20. West Thamesmead (2)
21. Woolwich Arsenal (3)
22. Woolwich Common (2)
23. Woolwich Dockyard (2)

== Premises ==
Although named after Greenwich, the council has always had its main offices and meeting place in Woolwich. Council meetings are held at Woolwich Town Hall on Wellington Street, which was completed in 1906 for the old Woolwich Borough Council.

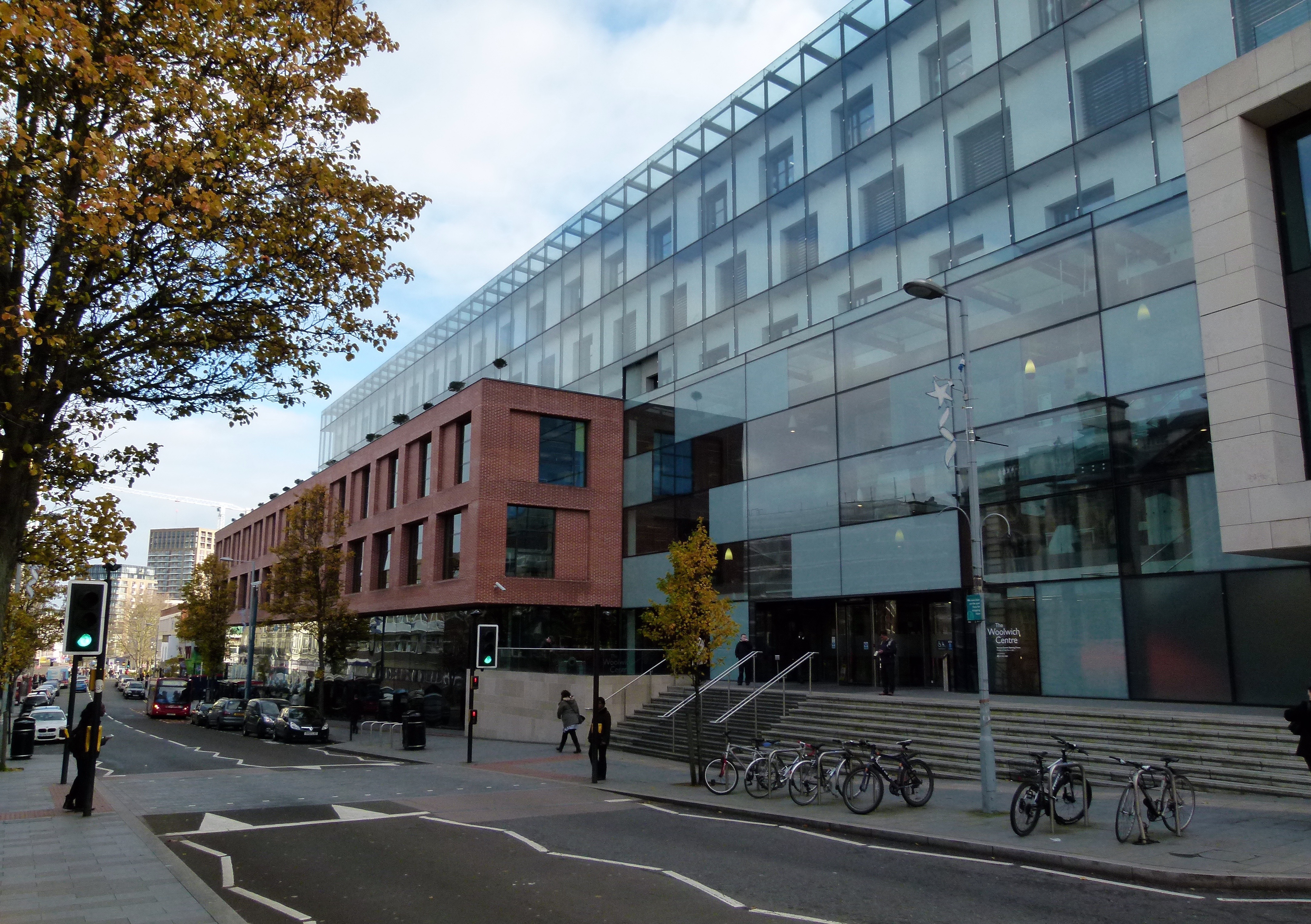
The Woolwich Centre, 35 Wellington Street, London, SE18 6HQ: Council's main offices since 2011

The council's main offices are at the Woolwich Centre, on the opposite side of Wellington Street from the Town Hall. The Woolwich Centre was completed for the council in 2011 and also includes a library.

Awards and achievements
Preceded by Southend-on-Sea	LGC Council of the Year; 2013	Succeeded by Durham
