= Thamesmead Moorings =

Electoral ward in the Greenwich, England

- Electoral ward for the Greenwich London Borough Council
- Borough: Greenwich
- County: Greater London
- Population: 12,452 (2021)
- Area: 2.066 km²

Current electoral ward
- Created: 1978
- Councillors: 2

Thamesmead Moorings is an electoral ward in the Royal Borough of Greenwich. The ward was first used in the 1978 elections. It returns two councillors to Greenwich London Borough Council.

== Geography ==
The ward is based on the riverside areas of Thamesmead.

== Councillors ==
Election	Councillors	
2022	Olu Babatola (Labour)	Averil Lekau (Labour)

== Elections ==
=== 2022 Greenwich London Borough Council election ===
Thamesmead Moorings (2)
Party	Candidate	Votes	%	±%
Labour	Olu Babatola*	1,323	77.3	
Labour	Averil Lekau*	1,242	72.5	
Conservative	Paul Drake	359	21.0	
Conservative	Peter Nutting	311	18.2	
Liberal Democrats	Judy Spence	190	11.1	
Turnout			23.6	
Labour hold		Swing		
Labour hold		Swing		
