= Woolwich Common (ward) =

Electoral ward in the Greenwich, England

- Electoral ward for the Greenwich London Borough Council
- Borough: Greenwich
- County: Greater London
- Population: 12,688 (2021)
- Area: 1.365 km²

Current electoral ward
- Created: 1978
- Councillors: 2

Woolwich Common is an electoral ward in the Royal Borough of Greenwich. The ward was first used in the 1978 elections. It returns two councillors to Greenwich London Borough Council.

== Geography ==
The ward is named after Woolwich Common.

== Councillors ==
Election	Councillors	
2022	Elizabeth Ige (Labour)	Anthony Okereke (Labour)

== Elections ==
=== 2022 Greenwich London Borough Council election ===
Woolwich Common (2)
Party	Candidate	Votes	%	±%
Labour	Elizabeth Ige	1,486	79.3	
Labour	Anthony Okereke*	1,350	72.0	
Conservative	Elaine Pooke	326	17.4	
Conservative	Mike Rafferty	299	16.0	
Liberal Democrats	Matthew Glinsman	288	15.4	
Turnout			24.8	
Labour hold		Swing		
Labour hold		Swing		
