= 2022 London local elections =

- 5 May 2022

All 1,817 councillors on all 32 London boroughs, and 5 directly-elected mayors
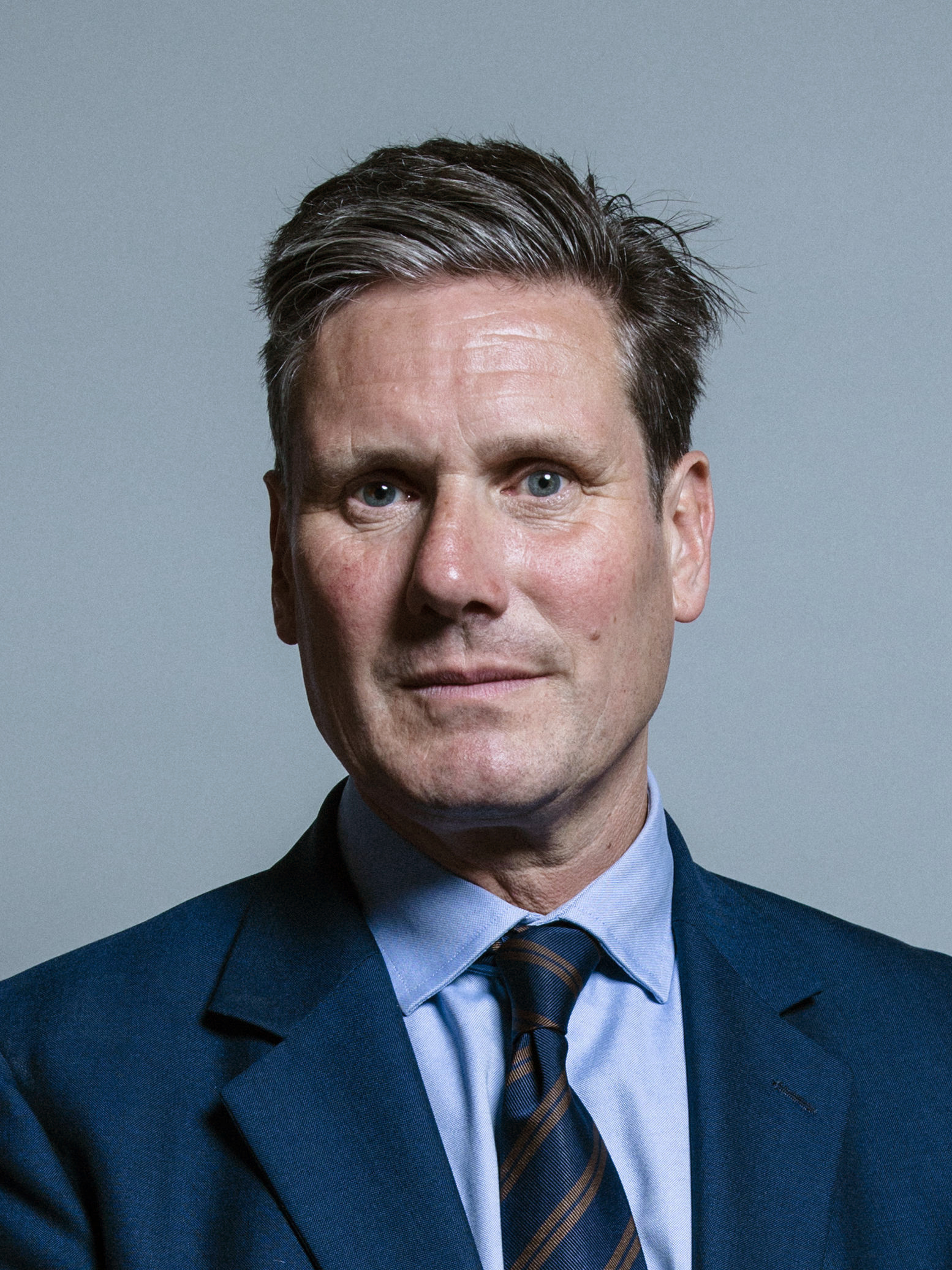

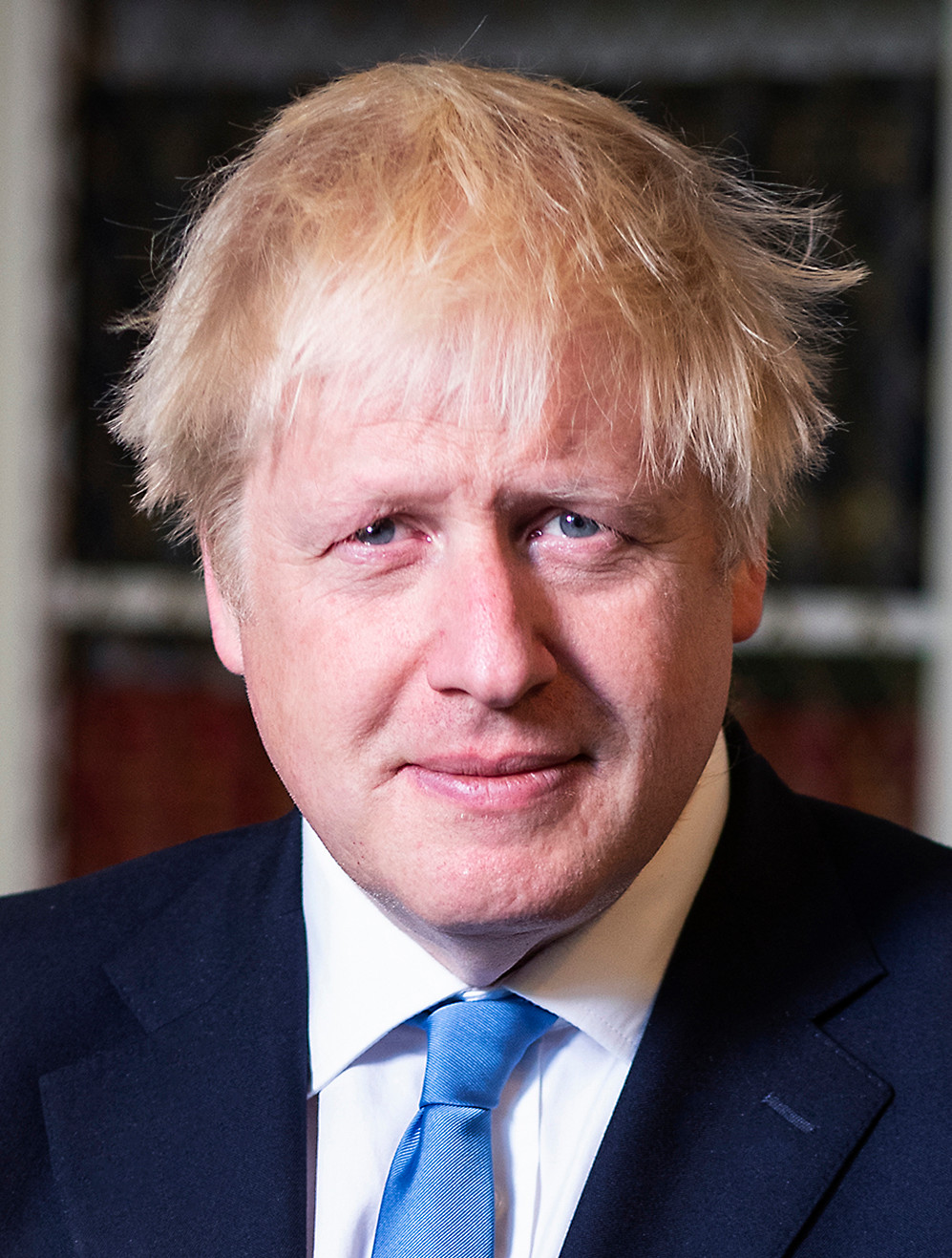

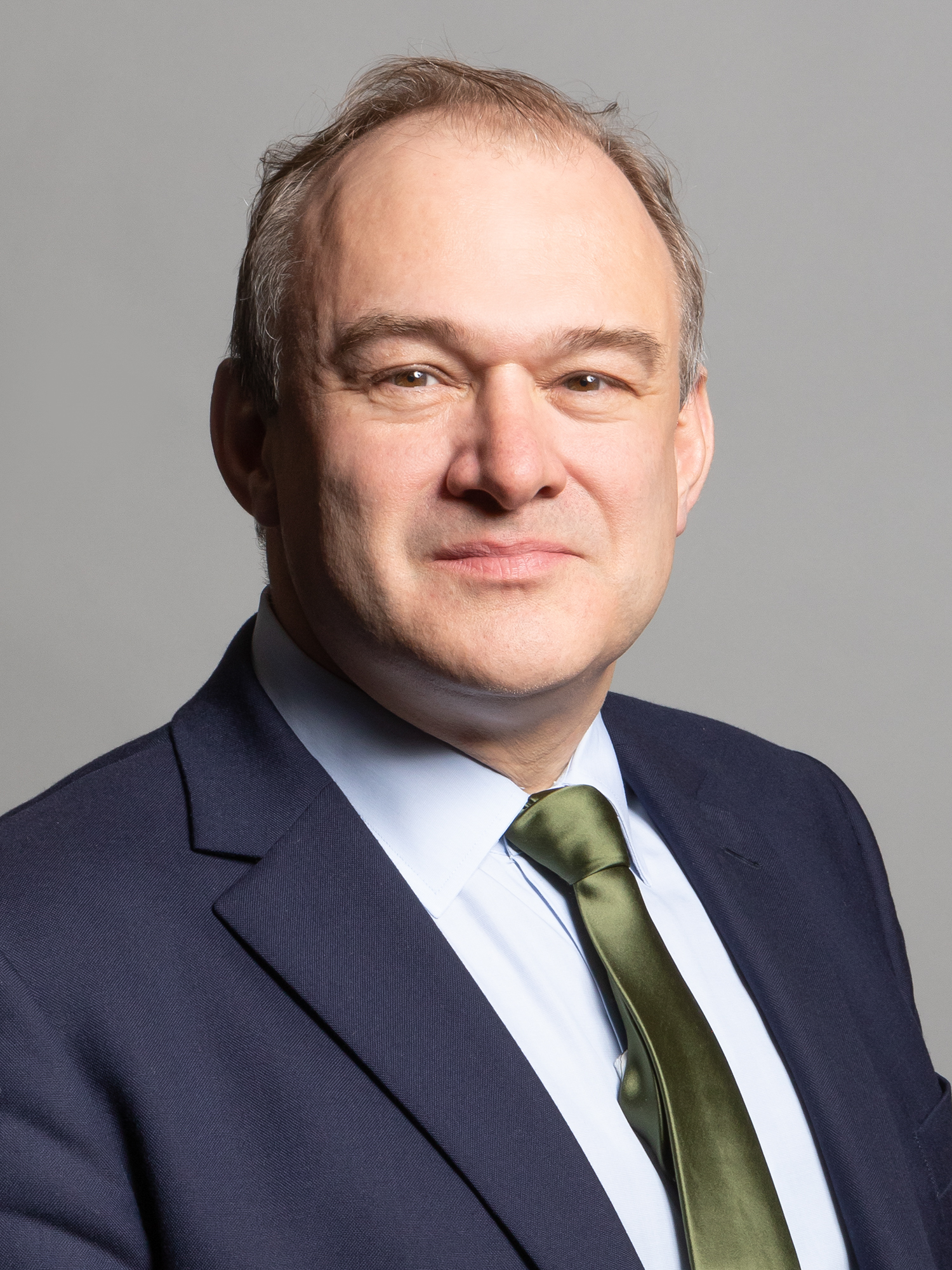

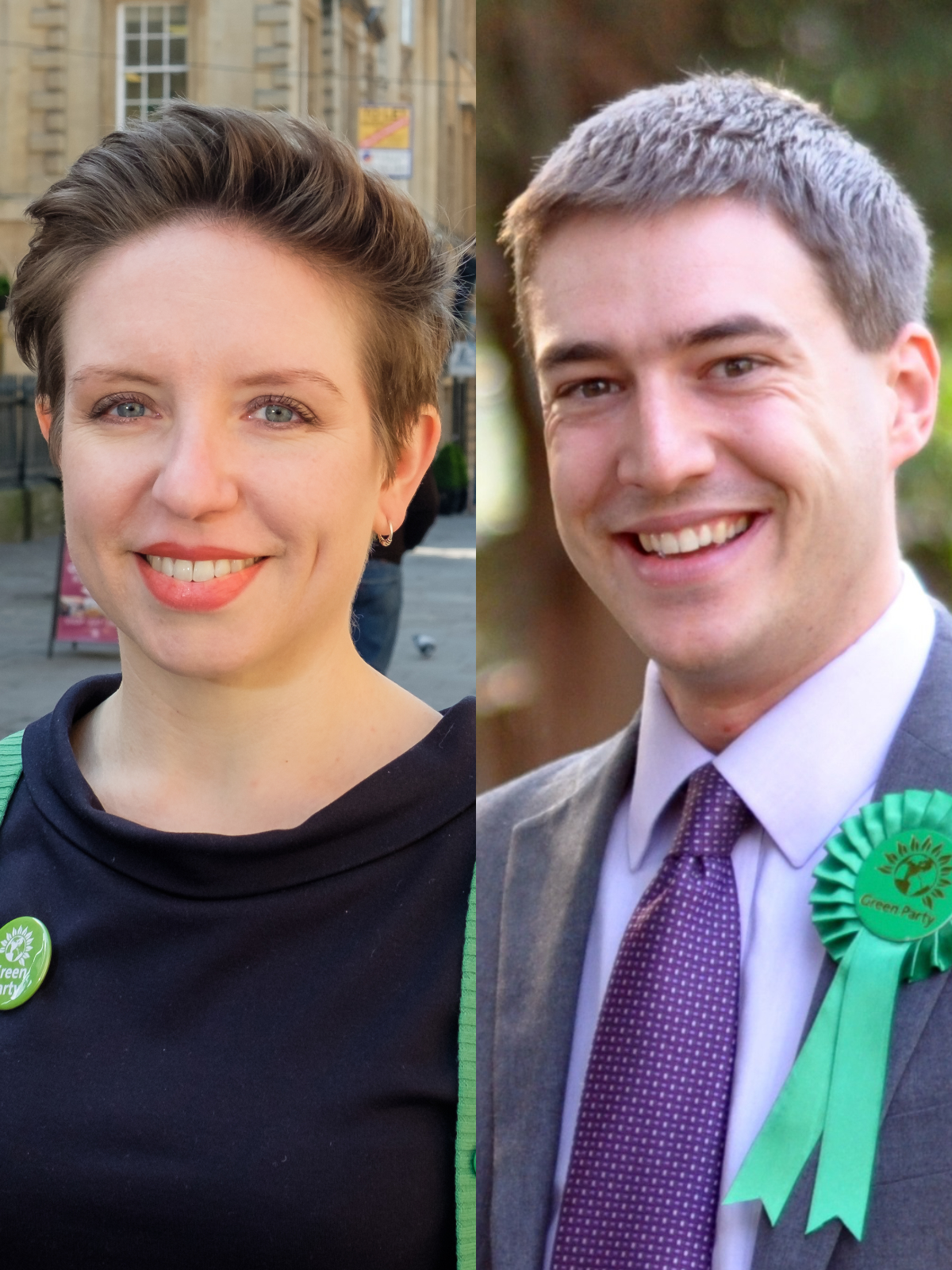
	First party	Second party
Leader	Keir Starmer	Boris Johnson
Party	Labour	Conservative
Last election	1,128 seats, 43.9%	508 seats, 28.8%
Seats won	1,156 seats 21 councils	404 seats 5 councils
Seat change	▲28; 0 councils	▼104 seats ▼2 councils
Popular vote	978,130	601,941
Percentage	40.3%	24.8%
Swing	▼3.4%	▼3.9%
Mayors	3	1
Mayors +/–	▼1	▲1
	Third party	Fourth party
Leader	Ed Davey	Carla Denyer & Adrian Ramsay
Party	Liberal Democrats	Green
Last election	152 seats, 13.0%	11 seats, 8.6%
Seats won	180 seats 3 councils	18 seats 0 councils
Seat change	▲28 seats 0 councils	▲7 seats 0 councils
Popular vote	335,415	275,927
Percentage	13.8%	11.4%
Swing	▲0.7%	▲2.5%

The 2022 London local elections took place on 5 May 2022, as part of the 2022 United Kingdom local elections. All London borough councillor seats were up for election. Mayoral elections took place in Hackney, Lewisham, Newham and Tower Hamlets, with Croydon electing a mayor for the first time following a local referendum in October 2021.

The election saw Labour gain majority control of Barnet, Wandsworth and Westminster councils whilst the Conservatives gained majority control of Harrow Council and the Aspire Party gained control of Tower Hamlets Council, both from Labour. Labour also lost Croydon Council to no overall control. Of the four existing mayoralties, Labour held three but lost the position of mayor of Tower Hamlets to Lutfur Rahman of the Aspire Party, who had previously been removed from the same office after being found guilty of "corrupt or illegal practices" by an election court. The Conservative candidate Jason Perry won the newly created Croydon mayoralty.

== Background ==
The previous borough council elections in May 2018 saw the London Labour Party achieve their best result in over 45 years, winning 44% of the vote, 1,128 councillors and control of 21 councils. This represented the party's second-best result in a London local election, only surpassed slightly by its 1971 total. The London Conservatives, lost 92 seats to finish with 508 councillors, its lowest-ever tally of seats in a London local election. The London Liberal Democrats won two councils from the Conservatives, the London Green Party won a total of 11 council seats and support for the UK Independence Party collapsed, with the party losing all of its seats. In the 2019 general election, there was no net change in the number of seats for each party, although several seats changed hands. The biggest changes in vote share were for Labour, who received 48% of the vote across the city but saw a fall of 6.5 percentage points, and the Liberal Democrats, who were up 6.1 percentage points compared to the previous 2017 general election.

Newham and Tower Hamlets held local referendums in May 2021 on whether to abolish their mayoral positions and return to a leader and cabinet system. Both resulted in voters choosing to retain the mayoral model. In the same month, the Labour candidate Sadiq Khan was re-elected as the mayor of London, and the 2021 London Assembly election resulted in small gains for the Conservatives, Green Party and Liberal Democrats at the expense of Labour and the UK Independence Party. Croydon Council held a referendum on 7 October 2021 on whether to adopt a mayor position. The result was to change to the mayoral system, with the first mayor being due to be elected alongside the council election in 2022.

Twenty-five of the thirty-two boroughs elected councillors under new ward boundaries following reviews by the Local Government Boundary Commission for England.

== Campaign ==
In January 2022, the Conservative peer Robert Hayward said that in the wake of the Westminster lockdown parties controversy, his party risked losing control of Wandsworth, Westminster, Barnet and Hillingdon London Borough Councils. Polls of London in January and March 2022 showed Labour with a large lead over the Conservatives. Dave Hill in OnLondon wrote that the poll results would make Labour more confident of making gains in Barnet, Wandsworth, Hillingdon and Westminster, and of winning the new directly-elected mayoralty of Croydon despite financial issues in the borough. He also wrote that the Conservatives were aiming to make gains in Harrow. Nick Bowes, the chief executive of the Centre for London, wrote that Labour gaining control of Barnet and Wandsworth councils would "be a good night for the party in London". The academics Colin Rallings and Michael Thrasher wrote that Labour's strong result in the 2018 election meant "it may be hard for Labour to make much headway or for the Conservatives to fall much further".

A poll by Survation on what issues would affect how people voted showed Council Tax, the Westminster lockdown parties controversy, and social care quality as the main issues, with far fewer voters ranking Low Traffic Neighbourhood schemes as one of the issues that would most affect how they vote.

The Liberal Democrats launched their local election campaign on 6 April. The party were targeting seats on Merton Council. Labour launched their London local election campaign on 9 April, with the national party leader Keir Starmer and the mayor of London saying that the Conservative government had "abandoned" London and were not concerned about the rising cost of living.

The journalist Ben Walker, writing in the New Statesman, modelled what the election results would look like according to the voteshares in an April poll by Opinium. His model showed Labour gaining control of Wandsworth and Barnet, with 1,157 to 1,188 seats across the city, while the Conservatives would win between 428 and 452 seats, the Liberal Democrats would win between 149 and 179 seats, and the Green Party would win between 11 and 22 seats.

== Council results ==
=== Summary ===
Party	Votes won	% votes	Change	Seats	% seats	Change	Councils	Change
Labour	978,130	42.1	▼1.6	1,156	63.6	▲28	21	Steady
Conservative	601,941	25.9	▼2.8	404	22.2	▼104	5	▼2
Liberal Democrats	335,415	14.4	▲1.3	180	9.9	▲28	3	Steady
Green	275,927	11.9	▲3.0	18	1.0	▲7	0	Steady
Others	131,991	5.7	▲0.1	59	3.2	▲25	1	▲1
No overall control	—N/a						2	▲1

=== Control ===
Council	Seats	Party control		Details
Council	Seats	Previous	Result	Details
Barking and Dagenham	51 (Note: New election boundaries)	Labour	Labour	Details
Barnet	63	Conservative	Labour	Details
Bexley	45	Conservative	Conservative	Details
Brent	57	Labour	Labour	Details
Bromley	58	Conservative	Conservative	Details
Camden	55	Labour	Labour	Details
Croydon	70	Labour	No overall control (Conservative minority)	Details
Ealing	70	Labour	Labour	Details
Enfield	63	Labour	Labour	Details
Greenwich	55	Labour	Labour	Details
Hackney	57	Labour	Labour	Details
Hammersmith and Fulham	50	Labour	Labour	Details
Haringey	57	Labour	Labour	Details
Harrow	55	Labour	Conservative	Details
Havering	55	No overall control (Conservative/ind. coalition)	No overall control (HRA/Labour coalition)	Details
Hillingdon	53	Conservative	Conservative	Details
Hounslow	62	Labour	Labour	Details
Islington	51	Labour	Labour	Details
Kensington and Chelsea	50	Conservative	Conservative	Details
Kingston upon Thames	48	Liberal Democrats	Liberal Democrats	Details
Lambeth	63	Labour	Labour	Details
Lewisham	54	Labour	Labour	Details
Merton	57	Labour	Labour	Details
Newham	66	Labour	Labour	Details
Redbridge	63	Labour	Labour	Details
Richmond upon Thames	54	Liberal Democrats	Liberal Democrats	Details
Southwark	63	Labour	Labour	Details
Sutton	55	Liberal Democrats	Liberal Democrats	Details
Tower Hamlets	45	Labour	Aspire	Details
Waltham Forest	60	Labour	Labour	Details
Wandsworth	58	Conservative	Labour	Details
Westminster	54	Conservative	Labour	Details
All 32 councils	1,817			

=== Councillors ===
The table below shows the number of councillors won by each party for each council in London. The shaded cells show the party or parties in each council's governing administration.

Council	Lab	Con	Lib Dem	Green	Others	Details
Barking and Dagenham	51	0	0	0	0	Details
Barnet	41	22	0	0	0	Details
Bexley	12	33	0	0	0	Details
Brent	49	5	3	0	0	Details
Bromley	12	36	5	0	5 Chislehurst Matters: 3 Independent: 2	Details
Camden	47	3	4	1	0	Details
Croydon	34	33 (Note: Led by a Conservative Mayor)	1	2	0	Details
Ealing	59	5	6	0	0	Details
Enfield	38	25	0	0	0	Details
Greenwich	52	3	0	0	0	Details
Hackney	50	5	0	2	0	Details
Hammersmith and Fulham	40	10	0	0	0	Details
Haringey	50	0	7	0	0	Details
Harrow	24	31	0	0	0	Details
Havering	9	23	0	0	23 Havering Residents Association: 20 (Note: Led by a Havering Residents Association and Labour coalition); Harold Hill Independent: 3	Details
Hillingdon	23	30	0	0	0	Details
Hounslow	52	10	0	0	0	Details
Islington	48	0	0	3	0	Details
Kensington and Chelsea	13	35	2	0	0	Details
Kingston upon Thames	0	3	44	0	1 Independent: 1	Details
Lambeth	58	0	3	2	0	Details
Lewisham	54	0	0	0	0	Details
Merton	31	7	17	0	2 Merton Park Ward Independent Residents: 2	Details
Newham	64	0	0	2	0	Details
Redbridge	58	5	0	0	0	Details
Richmond upon Thames	0	1	48	5	0	Details
Southwark	52	0	11	0	0	Details
Sutton	3	20	29	0	3 Independent: 3	Details
Tower Hamlets	19	1	0	1	24 Aspire: 24	Details
Waltham Forest	47	13	0	0	0	Details
Wandsworth	35	22	0	0	1 Independent: 1	Details
Westminster	31	23	0	0	0	Details
Total	1,156	404	180	18	59	

== Mayors ==
Council	Mayor before	Elected mayor
Croydon	New office	Jason Perry (Con)
Hackney	Philip Glanville (Lab)	Philip Glanville (Lab)
Lewisham	Damien Egan (Lab)	Damien Egan (Lab)
Newham	Rokhsana Fiaz (Lab)	Rokhsana Fiaz (Lab)
Tower Hamlets	John Biggs (Lab)	Lutfur Rahman (Aspire)

== Opinion polling ==
Date(s) conducted	Polling organisation/client	Sample size	Lab	Con	Lib Dem	Green	Others	Don't know	Wouldn't vote	Refused	Lead
5 May 2022	2022 elections	n/a	42.1%	25.9%	14.4%	11.9%	5.7%	-	-	-	16.2%
19–22 April 2022	YouGov/QMUL	1,232	50%	23%	12%	9%	-	-	-	-	27%
14–20 April 2022	Opinium/Sky News	1,000	45%	25%	12%	10%	-	-	-	-	20%
3–7 March 2022	Deltapoll/London Communications Agency	1,026	54%	24%	9%	5%	8%	-	-	-	30%
28 February – 3 March 2022	YouGov/QMUL	1,114	34%	17%	8%	6%	3%	9%	17%	5%	17%
3 May 2018	2018 elections	n/a	43.7%	28.7%	13.1%	8.9%	5.6%	-	-	-	15.0%

== Ward result maps ==
=== London-wide ===
The map below shows the results for each ward across the whole of Greater London.

2022 London local elections results map

=== By borough ===
Barking and Dagenham 2022 results map

Barnet 2022 results map

Bexley 2022 results map

Brent 2022 results map

Bromley 2022 results map

Camden 2022 results map

Croydon 2022 results map

Ealing 2022 results map

Enfield 2022 results map

Greenwich 2022 results map

Hackney 2022 results map

Hammersmith and Fulham 2022 results map

Haringey 2022 results map

Harrow 2022 results map

Havering 2022 results map

Hillingdon 2022 results map

Hounslow 2022 results map

Islington 2022 results map

Kensington and Chelsea 2022 results map

Kingston upon Thames 2022 results map

Lambeth 2022 results map

Lewisham 2022 results map

Merton 2022 results map

Richmond upon Thames 2022 results map

Sutton 2022 results map

Tower Hamlets 2022 results map

Waltham Forest 2022 results map

Wandsworth 2022 results map

Westminster 2022 results map

== See also ==
- 2022 City of London Corporation election
