= Greenwich London Borough Council elections =

Class of UK elections

A map showing the wards of Greenwich from 2002 until 2022

Greenwich London Borough Council is the local authority for the Royal Borough of Greenwich in London, England. The council is elected every four years. Since the last boundary changes in 2022, 55 councillors have been elected from 23 wards.

== Political control ==
The first elections to the council were held in 1964, ahead of the new system coming into full effect in 1965. Political control of the council since 1964 has been held by the following parties:

Election	Overall Control	Labour	Conservative	Lib Dem	SDP	Green	Reform
1964	Labour	49	11	-	-	-	-
1968	Conservative	22	38	-	-	-	-
1971	Labour	55	5	-	-	-	-
1974	Labour	52	8	-	-	-	-
1978	Labour	45	17	-	-	-	-
1982	Labour	43	16	3	-	-	-
1986	Labour	44	12	6	-	-	-
1990	Labour	44	12	2	4	-	-
1994	Labour	47	8	3	4	-	-
1998	Labour	52	8	2	-	-	-
2002	Labour	38	9	4	-	-	-
2006	Labour	36	13	2	-	-	-
2010	Labour	40	11	-	-	-	-
2014	Labour	43	8	-	-	-	-
2018	Labour	42	9	-	-	-	-
2022	Labour	52	3	-	-	-	-
2026	Labour	35	6	-	-	13	1

== Council elections ==
- 1964 Greenwich London Borough Council election
- 1968 Greenwich London Borough Council election
- 1971 Greenwich London Borough Council election
- 1974 Greenwich London Borough Council election
- 1978 Greenwich London Borough Council election (boundary changes increased the number of seats by two)
- 1982 Greenwich London Borough Council election
- 1986 Greenwich London Borough Council election
- 1990 Greenwich London Borough Council election
- 1994 Greenwich London Borough Council election (boundary changes took place but the number of seats remained the same) (Note: The Bexley and Greenwich (London Borough Boundaries) Order 1993) (Note: The Bromley and Greenwich (London Borough Boundaries) Order 1993) (Note: The Greenwich and Lewisham (London Borough Boundaries) Order 1993)
- 1998 Greenwich London Borough Council election
- 2002 Greenwich London Borough Council election (boundary changes reduced the number of seats by eleven)
- 2006 Greenwich London Borough Council election
- 2010 Greenwich London Borough Council election
- 2014 Greenwich London Borough Council election
- 2018 Greenwich London Borough Council election
- 2022 Greenwich London Borough Council election (boundary changes increased the number of seats by four)
- 2026 Greenwich London Borough Council election

== Borough result maps ==
2002 results map

2006 results map

2010 results map

2014 results map

2018 results map

2022 results map

2026 results map

== By-election results ==
=== 1964-1968 ===
There were no by-elections.

=== 1968-1971 ===
Kidbrooke by-election, 12 February 1970
Party	Candidate	Votes	%	±%
Labour	I. N. Smith	1076		
Conservative	D. C. Hammond	548		
Fellowship	R. S. Mallone	124		
Liberal	J. R. Hassall	59		
Turnout			26.5%	

Marsh by-election, 12 March 1970
Party	Candidate	Votes	%	±%
Labour	F. G. Burton	894		
Conservative	J. T. E. Tate	493		
Liberal	L. M. Gregg	198		
Turnout			44.2%	

West by-election, 27 August 1970
Party	Candidate	Votes	%	±%
Labour	J. E. Austin-Walker	962		
Conservative	H. Hook	263		
National Front	R. S. Pritchard	82		
Liberal	R. S. Warwicker	40		
Turnout			21.9%	

=== 1971-1974 ===
Eastcombe by-election, 20 July 1972
Party	Candidate	Votes	%	±%
Labour	D. T. Cooper	921		
Conservative	S. P. Bertram	329		
Turnout			29.2%	

Shooters Hill by-election, 28 September 1972
Party	Candidate	Votes	%	±%
Conservative	S. G. Wayment	982		
Labour	I. E. Porter	468		
Liberal	J. R. Hassall	167		
Turnout			30.4%	

Slade by-election, 23 November 1972
Party	Candidate	Votes	%	±%
Labour	J. D. Upson	953		
Conservative	R. W. Bartlett	462		
Independent	H. H. Wright	36		
Turnout			25.8%	

=== 1974-1978 ===
Abbey Road by-election, 8 May 1975
Party	Candidate	Votes	%	±%
Labour	Woodrow Clachar	1,547		
Conservative	Stephanie Read	783		
Liberal	Michael Taylor	286		
National Front	Philip Hanman	178		
Turnout			31.1	

Eynsham by-election, 8 May 1975
Party	Candidate	Votes	%	±%
Labour	Alan Brooks	1,115		
Conservative	Christopher Cook	214		
National Front	Alan Webb	93		
Liberal	Robert Smith	90		
Turnout			25.4	

St Mary's by-election, 8 May 1975
Party	Candidate	Votes	%	±%
Labour	Catherine Jeffrey	1,493		
Conservative	Christopher Mead	712		
Liberal	Brian Woodcraft	173		
National Front	Ruth Robinson	75		
Turnout			30.7	

St Margaret's by-election, 14 August 1975
Party	Candidate	Votes	%	±%
Conservative	Stephanie Read	1,198		
Labour	Ramanlal Naik	1,013		
Liberal	Anny Knight	178		
Turnout			30.4	

West by-election, 28 October 1976
Party	Candidate	Votes	%	±%
Labour	William White	697		
Conservative	James Foreman-Peck	475		
National Front	Helena Steven	142		
National Party	David McCalden	123		
Liberal	Geoffrey Jerrom	109		
Fellowship	Ronald Mallone	13		
Turnout			28.4	

Kidbrooke by-election, 17 February 1977
Party	Candidate	Votes	%	±%
Conservative	Colin Coulson-Thomas	1,111		
Labour	Allan MacCarthy	1,019		
Fellowship	Ronald Mallone	320		
National Front	Robert Holden	216		
National Party	David McCalden	104		
Turnout			35.1	

=== 1978-1982 ===
Blackheath by-election, 20 September 1979
Party	Candidate	Votes	%	±%
Conservative	Patrick Jiggins	1005	16.1	
Labour	Glyn Williams	577	37.0	
Fellowship	Ronald Mallone	163	46.9	
United Democrat	Jonathan Savage	15	46.9	
Turnout		1760	32.4	
Conservative hold		Swing		

Resignation of Cllr James Foreman-Peck (Conservative)

Glyndon by-election, 25 September 1980
Party	Candidate	Votes	%	±%
Labour	Glyn Williams	957	85.5	
Conservative	Walter Cox	86	7.5	
Liberal	Maureen Hall	80	7.0	
Turnout		1141	26.2	
Labour hold		Swing		

Resignation of Cllr Joseph Stanyer (Labour)

Herbert by-election, 25 September 1980
Party	Candidate	Votes	%	±%
Labour	Francis Smith	1307	85.5	
Conservative	Roy Mapes	584	7.5	
Liberal	Peter Churchill	241	7.0	
Turnout		2132	38.0	
Labour hold		Swing		

Resignation of Cllr John Dunbar (Labour)

Avery Hill by-election, 26 March 1981
Party	Candidate	Votes	%	±%
Labour	James Coughlan	667	47.3	
Liberal	Edward Randall	395	28.0	
Conservative	Dingle Clark	348	24.7	
Turnout		1410	50.4	
Labour hold		Swing		

Resignation of Cllr Anthony Newman (Labour)

West by-election, 7 May 1981
Party	Candidate	Votes	%	±%
Labour	Ephron Williams	1474	76.2	
Conservative	Michael Niblock	460	23.8	
Turnout		1934	38.1	
Labour hold		Swing		

Resignation of Cllr William White (LAB)

=== 1982-1986 ===
Herbert by-election, 3 March 1983
Party	Candidate	Votes	%	±%
Labour	Julius Evaristo	974	38.3	
SDP	Terence Malone	821	32.3	
Conservative	Margaret Mendez	715	28.1	
United Democrat	Daniel Hussey	31	1.2	
Turnout		2541	46.4	
Labour hold		Swing		

Resignation of Cllr Francis Smith (Labour)

Ferrier by-election, 20 September 1984
Party	Candidate	Votes	%	±%
Labour	Serena Lovelace	824	47.8	
Alliance	Timothy Ford	503	29.2	
Conservative	John Antcliffe	396	23.0	
Turnout		1723	33.0	
Labour hold		Swing		

Resignation of Cllr David Crowther (Labour)

Blackheath by-election, 28 February 1985
Party	Candidate	Votes	%	±%
Conservative	John Antcliffe	1105	7.5	
Alliance	Vivienne Stone	855	29.2	
Labour	Annette Barratt	636	85.5	
Ecology	Kim Castle	66	7.0	
Turnout		2662	50.5	
Conservative hold		Swing		

Resignation of Cllr Raymond Hatter (Conservative)

=== 1986-1990 ===
Woolwich Common by-election, 2 April 1987
Party	Candidate	Votes	%	±%
Alliance	Michael Slavin	997	46.9	
Labour	Carol Hibberd	785	37.0	
Conservative	Anthony Salter	342	16.1	
Turnout		2124	24.77	
Alliance gain from Labour		Swing		

Resignation of Cllr Nicholas Smith (Labour)

Sherard by-election, 10 September 1987
Party	Candidate	Votes	%	±%
Labour	Robert Callow	1268	58.6	
Conservative	Gerard Fergus	582	26.9	
Alliance	Myrtle Bibby	313	14.5	
Turnout		2163	37.55	
Labour hold		Swing		

Resignation of Cllr Mervyn Jeffrey (Labour)

Glyndon by-election, 28 January 1988
Party	Candidate	Votes	%	±%
SDP	David Hadden	1066	14.5	
Labour	Nicholas McShee	760	58.6	
Conservative	Christopher Wagstaff	114	26.9	
Turnout		1940	34.28	
SDP gain from Labour		Swing		

Resignation of Cllr Steven Morgan (Labour)

=== 1990-1994 ===
Kidbrooke by-election, 25 June 1992
Party	Candidate	Votes	%	±%
Conservative	Hugh Harris	956	44.7	
Labour	Keith Scott	756	35.3	
Liberal Democrats	Michael Smart	235	11.0	
Fellowship	Ronald Mallone	193	9.0	
Turnout			45.1	
Conservative hold		Swing		

The by-election was called following the resignation of Cllr Giles Brennand.

Eltham Park by-election, 21 January 1993
Party	Candidate	Votes	%	±%
Conservative	Dermot Poston	1,239	47.1	
Labour	Michael Yates	770	29.3	
Liberal Democrats	John Hagyard	483	18.4	
Independent	Eileen Guthrie	140	5.3	
Turnout			50.1	
Conservative hold		Swing		

The by-election was called following the disqualification of Cllr Kenneth Kear.

Trafalgar by-election, 9 December 1993
Party	Candidate	Votes	%	±%
Labour	Marian Moseley	844	60.4	
Conservative	John Vickery	284	20.3	
Liberal Democrats	Stuart Davis	269	19.3	
Turnout			27.7	
Labour hold		Swing		

The by-election was called following the resignation of Cllr Roger Taylor.

=== 1994-1998 ===
Lakedale by-election, 29 June 1995
Party	Candidate	Votes	%	±%
Labour	Junior Boothe	884	77.3	
Liberal Democrats	Thomas Headon	149	13.0	
Conservative	Frances Stephens	110	9.6	
Turnout		1143		
Labour hold		Swing		

The by-election was called following the resignation of Cllr Adele Gordon-Peiniger.

St Nicholas by-election, 2 May 1996
Party	Candidate	Votes	%	±%
Labour	Alistair Macrae	972	63.9	
Liberal Democrats	Thomas Headon	343	22.5	
Conservative	Stephen Tough	207	13.6	
Turnout		1522		
Labour hold		Swing		

The by-election was called following the resignation of Cllr Annette Barratt.

Kidbrooke by-election, 6 February 1997
Party	Candidate	Votes	%	±%
Labour	John Cove	775	45.2	
Conservative	Raymond Maisey	614	35.8	
Fellowship	Ronald Mallone	157	9.1	
Liberal Democrats	Anthony Durham	137	8.0	
Socialist Labour	Peter Pierce	33	1.9	
Turnout		1716		
Labour hold		Swing		

The by-election was called following the resignation of Cllr Sabiha Shahzad.

Thamesmead Moorings by-election, 16 October 1997
Party	Candidate	Votes	%	±%
Labour	Peter Brooks	611	85.7	
Liberal Democrats	Bonnie Soanes	102	14.3	
Turnout		713		
Labour hold		Swing		

The by-election was called following the death of Cllr Claude Ramsey.

=== 1998-2002 ===
New Eltham by-election, 23 March 2000
Party	Candidate	Votes	%	±%
Conservative	Albert Hills	930		
Labour	Peter May	760		
Liberal Democrats	Michael Lewis	115		
Green	James Otter	40		
Turnout				
Conservative hold		Swing		

The by-election was called following the death of Cllr Sidney Nicholson.

Trafalgar by-election, 4 May 2000
Party	Candidate	Votes	%	±%
Labour	Mary Mills	936		
Liberal Democrats	Christopher Le Breton	654		
Conservative	Douglas Ellison	274		
Independent	Richard Newton	92		
Turnout				
Labour hold		Swing		

The by-election was called following the death of Cllr Marian Moseley.

Burrage by-election, 7 June 2001
Party	Candidate	Votes	%	±%
Labour	Harpinder Singh	787		
Conservative	Michael O’Loan	185		
Liberal Democrats	Thomas Headon	172		
Socialist Alliance	Paul Richardson	60		
Turnout				
Labour hold		Swing		

The by-election was called following the resignation of Cllr Len Duvall.

=== 2002-2006 ===
Plumstead by-election, 18 December 2003
Party	Candidate	Votes	%	±%
Labour	Kanta Patel	744		
Liberal Democrats	Steven Toole	365		
Conservative	Jagvinder Mahil	201		
Independent	Susan Mitchell	136		
Green	James Otter	103		
Turnout				
Labour hold		Swing		

The by-election was called following the death of Cllr Alistair Macrae.

Shooters Hill by-election, 29 July 2004
Party	Candidate	Votes	%	±%
Labour	Danny Thorpe	968		
Conservative	Nigel Fletcher	589		
Liberal Democrats	Edward Ottery	483		
UKIP	Arnold Tarling	142		
CPA	Stephen Hammond	62		
Turnout				
Labour hold		Swing		

The by-election was called following the resignation of Cllr Michael Hayes.

Eltham North by-election, 10 February 2005
Party	Candidate	Votes	%	±%
Conservative	Nigel Fletcher	1,326		
Labour	Janice Marnham	1,252		
Liberal Democrats	Leonard Tostevin	289		
UKIP	Jeremy Elms	193		
CPA	Stephen Hammond	20		
Turnout				
Conservative hold		Swing		

The by-election was called following the resignation of Cllr Douglas Ellison.

=== 2006-2010 ===
Plumstead by-election, 25 September 2008
Party	Candidate	Votes	%	±%
Labour	Matthew Morrow	1318		
Conservative	Adetokunbo Bailey	542		
Liberal Democrats	Leonie Barron	195		
Green	Jessica Currie	175		
Turnout				
Labour hold		Swing		

The by-election was called following the death of Cllr Kantabai Patel.

=== 2010-2014 ===
There were no by-elections.

=== 2014-2018 ===
Greenwich West by-election, 7 May 2015
Party	Candidate	Votes	%	±%
Labour	Mehboob Khan	3,430	39.3	▼12.0
Conservative	Thomas Turrell	2,466	28.2	▲10.4
Green	Robin Stott	1,452	16.6	▼4.7
Liberal Democrats	Sonia Dunlop	756	8.6	▼1.3
UKIP	Paul Butler	422	4.8	▲4.8
BNP	Christina Charles	138	1.6	▲1.6
TUSC	Sara Kasab	80	0.9	▲0.9
Turnout		3,717	64.1	
Labour hold		Swing		

The by-election was called following the resignation of Cllr Matthew Pennycook, who was elected as the Member of Parliament for the Greenwich and Woolwich constituency the same night.

Glyndon by-election, 5 May 2016
Party	Candidate	Votes	%	±%
Labour	Tonia Ashikodi	2,583	57.1	0.0
Conservative	Matt Browne	561	12.4	▲0.4
Green	Robin Stott	402	8.9	▼5.8
UKIP	Rita Dinsmore-Hamilton	380	8.4	▲8.4
Liberal Democrats	Stewart Christie	376	8.3	▲2.2
Independent	Ebru Ogun	157	3.5	▲3.5
All People's Party	Abiola Olaore	64	1.4	▲1.4
Majority		2,022	44.7	
Turnout			41.5	
Labour hold		Swing		

The by-election was called following the resignation of Councillor Radha Rabadia of the Labour Party.

Eltham North by-election, 10 November 2016
Party	Candidate	Votes	%	±%
Conservative	Charlie Davis	1,335	42.2	▲10.6
Labour	Simon Peirce	1,297	40.4	▼9.3
Liberal Democrats	Sam Macaulay	279	8.8	▲5.5
UKIP	Barbara Ray	160	5.1	▼14.5
Green	Matt Browne	110	3.5	▼6.0
Majority		38	1.8	
Turnout		3,186	31.33	
Conservative gain from Labour		Swing		

The by-election was called following the resignation of Councillor Wynn Davies of the Labour Party.

=== 2018-2022 ===
Glyndon by-election, 6 May 2021
Party	Candidate	Votes	%	±%
Labour	Sandra Bauer	2,520	59.4	▼0.4
Conservative	Naveed Mughal	687	16.2	▲4.7
Green	Leonie Barron	546	12.9	▲2.7
Liberal Democrats	Stewart Christie	402	9.5	▲5.3
TUSC	Lizzy Hedderly	87	2.1	▲2.1
Majority		1,833	43.2	
Turnout		4,242		
Labour hold		Swing		

The by-election was called following the resignation of Cllr Tonia Ashikodi.

Greenwich West by-election, 6 May 2021
Party	Candidate	Votes	%	±%
Labour	Pat Slattery	3,203	47.1	▼2.5
Conservative	Ben Crompton	1,228	18.1	▲3.5
Green	Matt Browne	1,135	16.7	▲5.3
Liberal Democrats	Rhian O'Connor	1,121	16.5	▼7.9
Monster Raving Loony	Trevor Allman	110	1.6	▲1.6
Majority		1,975	29.1	
Turnout		6,797		
Labour hold		Swing		

The by-election was called following the resignation of Cllr Mehboob Khan.

Kidbrooke with Hornfair by-election, 6 May 2021
Party	Candidate	Votes	%	±%
Labour	Odette McGahey	1,928	42.3	▼9.6
Conservative	Andrea Borbely	1,519	33.4	▲11.9
Green	Carol O'Toole	621	13.6	▲1.8
Liberal Democrats	Pierce Chalmers	261	5.7	▼3.1
Independent	Sharon Kent	225	4.9	▲4.9
Majority		409	9.0	
Turnout		4,554		
Labour hold		Swing		

The by-election was called following the death of Cllr Christine Grice.

Shooters Hill by-election, 6 May 2021
Party	Candidate	Votes	%	±%
Labour	Clare Burke-McDonald	2,479	54.2	▼0.3
Conservative	Daniel McGinley	1,286	28.1	▲11.6
Green	Tamasin Rhymes	548	12.0	▲0.7
Liberal Democrats	Ulysse Abbate	262	5.7	▲1.2
Majority		1,193	26.1	
Turnout		4,575		
Labour hold		Swing		

The by-election was called following the resignation of Cllr Chris Kirby.

=== 2022-2026 ===
Mottingham, Coldharbour and New Eltham by-election, 13 June 2024
Party	Candidate	Votes	%	±%
Conservative	Roger Tester	1,359	47.1	▲3.6
Labour	Nikki Thurlow	1,101	38.2	▼5.8
Reform	Mark Simpson	232	8.0	▲4.6
Green	Matt Stratford	101	3.5	▲3.5
Liberal Democrats	Ulysse Abbate	90	3.1	▼6.1
Majority		258	8.9	
Turnout		2,883		
Conservative hold		Swing		

The by-election was called following the death of Cllr John Hills.

Eltham Town and Avery Hill by-election, 17 October 2024
Party	Candidate	Votes	%	±%
Conservative	Charlie Davis	1,522	48.8	▲11.8
Labour	Chris McGurk	981	31.5	▼8.8
Reform	Ruth Handyside	290	9.3	▲5.9
Liberal Democrats	Kieran Edwards	132	4.2	▼2.9
Green	Mark Williams	123	3.9	▼8.1
Independent	Arnold Tarling	69	2.2	▲2.2
Majority		541	17.4	
Turnout		3,117		
Conservative gain from Labour		Swing		

The by-election was called following the resignation of Cllr Sammy Backon.

Shooters Hill by-election, 14 November 2024
Party	Candidate	Votes	%	±%
Labour	Raja Zeeshan	1,043	57.9	▼1.6
Conservative	Ezra Aydin	237	13.2	▼0.7
Green	Tamasin Rhymes	185	10.3	▼4.7
Reform	Alan Cecil	179	9.9	▲7.1
Liberal Democrats	Kirstie Shedden	158	8.8	▲0.1
Majority		806	44.7	
Turnout		1,802		
Labour hold		Swing		

The by-election was called following the resignation of Cllr Danny Thorpe.

West Thamesmead by-election, 19 December 2024
Party	Candidate	Votes	%	±%
Labour	Jahdia Spencer	464	45.1	
Liberal Democrats	Steve Day	336	32.7	
Reform	Ruth Handyside	92	8.9	
Conservative	Siama Qadar	82	8.0	
Green	Melanie Peterson	55	5.3	
Majority		128	12.4	
Turnout		1,029		
Labour hold		Swing		

The by-election was called following the resignation of Cllr Chris Lloyd, who was elected for the Labour Party but was sitting as a Liberal Democrat at the time of his resignation.

Shooters Hill by-election, 26 June 2025
Party	Candidate	Votes	%	±%
Green	Tamasin Rhymes	869	34.6	+24.3
Labour	Jummy Dawodu	756	30.1	−27.8
Reform	Paul Banks	402	16.0	+6.1
Conservative	Tim Waters	288	11.5	−1.7
Liberal Democrats	Kirstie Shedden	128	5.1	−3.7
Independent	Nazia Tingay	57	2.3	New
Independent	Arnold Tarling	9	0.4	New
Turnout		2,506	32.6	
Green gain from Labour		Swing		

The by-election was called following the resignation of Cllr Ivis Williams.
