= 1994 Greenwich London Borough Council election =

1994 local election in England

- 5 May 1994

All 62 seats up for election to Greenwich London Borough Council 32 seats needed for a majority
- Registered: 147,274
- Turnout: 70,108, 47.60% (▼3.55)

| | First party | Second party |
|---|---|---|
| Party | Labour | Conservative |
| Last election | 44 seats, 43.60% | 12 seats, 20.95% |
| Seats won | 47 | 8 |
| Seat change | ▲3 | ▼4 |
| Popular vote | 64,388 | 26,049 |
| Percentage | 55.39% | 22.41% |
| Swing | ▲11.79 | ▲1.46 |
| | Third party | Fourth party |
| Party | SDP | Liberal Democrats |
| Last election | 4 seats, 15.44% (Note: SDP was dissolved in 1990 by the national executive, this SDP was formed by members of the previous SDP who voted to continue the party) | 2 seats, 4.66% |
| Seats won | 4 | 3 |
| Seat change | Steady | ▲1 |
| Popular vote | 5,541 | 17,589 |
| Percentage | 4.76% | 15.13% |
| Swing | ▼10.68 | ▲10.47 |
Council control before election
Labour
Council control after election
Labour

The 1994 Greenwich Council election took place on 5 May 1994 to elect members of Greenwich London Borough Council in London, England. The whole council was up for election and the Labour party stayed in overall control of the council.

== Election result ==
1994 Greenwich London Borough Council elections
| Party | Seats | Gains | Losses | Net gain/loss | Seats % | Votes % | Votes | +/− |
|---|---|---|---|---|---|---|---|---|
| Labour | 47 (Note: Results include those from Leonard Duvall, who ran under the Labour and Co-operative banner) | 4 | 1 | ▲3 | 75.81 | 55.39 | 64,388 | ▲11.79 |
| Conservative | 8 | 0 | 4 | ▼4 | 12.90 | 22.41 | 26,049 | ▲1.46 |
| SDP | 4 | 0 | 0 | Steady | 6.45 | 4.76 | 5,541 | ▼10.68 |
| Liberal Democrats | 3 | 1 | 0 | ▲1 | 4.84 | 15.13 | 17,589 | ▲10.47 |
| Green | 0 | 0 | 0 | Steady | 0.00 | 1.41 | 1,635 | ▼1.79 |
| Fellowship | 0 | 0 | 0 | Steady | 0.00 | 0.40 | 468 | ▲0.10 |
| BNP | 0 | 0 | 0 | Steady | 0.00 | 0.28 | 324 | New |
| Independent | 0 | 0 | 0 | Steady | 0.00 | 0.22 | 250 | ▼0.55 |
| Total | 62 | | | | | | 116,244 | |

== Ward results ==
(*) - Indicates an incumbent candidate

(†) - Indicates an incumbent candidate standing in a different ward

=== Abbey Wood ===
Abbey Wood (2)
| Party | Candidate | Votes | % | ±% |
|---|---|---|---|---|
| SDP | David Lewis* | 1,569 | 58.96 | ▲10.32 |
| SDP | Terence Malone* | 1,528 | | |
| Labour | John Cove | 1,007 | 37.84 | ▲4.15 |
| Labour | Philip Graham^{†} (Note: Graham was a sitting councillor representing the Middle Park ward) | 980 | | |
| Liberal Democrats | Anthony Durham | 90 | 3.20 | New |
| Liberal Democrats | Simon Phillips | 78 | | |
| Registered electors | | 5,125 | | ▼488 |
| Turnout | | 2,713 | 52.94 | ▼1.31 |
| Rejected ballots | | 8 | 0.29 | ▼0.07 |
| SDP hold | | | | |
| SDP hold | | | | |

=== Arsenal ===
Arsenal (1)
| Party | Candidate | Votes | % | ±% |
|---|---|---|---|---|
| Labour | Justin Pierce | 712 | 76.72 | ▲22.83 |
| Liberal Democrats | Trevor Wilkins | 149 | 16.06 | ▼11.12 |
| Conservative | Elsie Frost | 67 | 7.22 | New |
| Registered electors | | 2,440 | | ▼336 |
| Turnout | | 930 | 38.11 | ▼0.47 |
| Rejected ballots | | 2 | 0.22 | ▼0.25 |
| Labour hold | | | | |

=== Avery Hill ===
Avery Hill (1)
| Party | Candidate | Votes | % | ±% |
|---|---|---|---|---|
| Liberal Democrats | Edward Randall* | 930 | 68.43 | ▲6.03 |
| Labour | David Clark | 260 | 19.13 | ▲0.93 |
| Conservative | Anthony Mitchell | 169 | 12.44 | ▼1.69 |
| Registered electors | | 2,515 | | ▼123 |
| Turnout | | 1,362 | 54.16 | ▼9.30 |
| Rejected ballots | | 3 | 0.22 | ▼0.02 |
| Liberal Democrats hold | | | | |

=== Blackheath ===
Blackheath (2)
| Party | Candidate | Votes | % | ±% |
|---|---|---|---|---|
| Conservative | Geoffrey Brighty* | 1,096 | 42.60 | ▲3.83 |
| Conservative | Christopher Phillips | 1,016 | | |
| Labour | Maureen O'Mara | 891 | 35.74 | ▲13.28 |
| Labour | Harold Cirullo | 880 | | |
| Liberal Democrats | Michael Smart | 473 | 17.99 | New |
| Liberal Democrats | Trevor Smith | 419 | | |
| Green | Darren Johnson | 103 | 3.67 | ▼9.53 |
| Green | Dean Walton | 79 | | |
| Registered electors | | 4,965 | | ▼103 |
| Turnout | | 2,575 | 51.86 | ▼3.86 |
| Rejected ballots | | 5 | 0.19 | ▲0.08 |
| Conservative hold | | | | |
| Conservative hold | | | | |

=== Burrage ===
Burrage (1)
| Party | Candidate | Votes | % | ±% |
|---|---|---|---|---|
| Labour Co-op | Leonard Duvall* | 743 | 73.35 | ▲14.63 |
| Liberal Democrats | Helen Wilkins | 161 | 15.89 | New |
| Conservative | Victor Walden | 109 | 10.76 | New |
| Registered electors | | 2,449 | | ▼241 |
| Turnout | | 1,018 | 41.57 | ▼2.78 |
| Rejected ballots | | 5 | 0.49 | ▼0.01 |
| Labour Co-op hold | | | | |

=== Charlton ===
Charlton (2)
| Party | Candidate | Votes | % | ±% |
|---|---|---|---|---|
| Labour | David Picton* | 1,337 | 67.92 | ▲18.23 |
| Labour | Sukhdev Sanghara* | 1,224 | | |
| Liberal Democrats | Anthony Smith | 350 | 18.29 | New |
| Liberal Democrats | Michael Westcombe | 339 | | |
| Conservative | Angela Evans | 276 | 13.79 | ▲0.88 |
| Conservative | Angela Evans | 243 | | |
| Registered electors | | 4,505 | | ▼225 |
| Turnout | | 2,064 | 45.82 | ▼7.82 |
| Rejected ballots | | 5 | 0.24 | ▲0.20 |
| Labour hold | | | | |
| Labour hold | | | | |

=== Coldharbour ===
Coldharbour (2)
| Party | Candidate | Votes | % | ±% |
|---|---|---|---|---|
| Labour | Peter Challis* | 1,300 | 56.13 | ▼13.96 |
| Labour | Jacques Devaux | 1,218 | | |
| Conservative | Thomas Power | 703 | 31.21 | ▼5.29 |
| Conservative | John Smith | 696 | | |
| Liberal Democrats | Doris Charlton | 312 | 12.66 | ▲2.27 |
| Liberal Democrats | Bernadette Vizena | 256 | | |
| Registered electors | | 4,567 | | ▼248 |
| Turnout | | 2,425 | 53.10 | ▼3.78 |
| Rejected ballots | | 14 | 0.58 | ▼0.47 |
| Labour hold | | | | |
| Labour hold | | | | |

=== Deansfield ===
Deansfield (1)
| Party | Candidate | Votes | % | ±% |
|---|---|---|---|---|
| Conservative | Alec Miles* | 719 | 47.65 | ▼0.38 |
| Labour | Billy Corbett | 538 | 35.65 | ▲3.59 |
| Liberal Democrats | Mark Payne | 252 | 16.70 | ▲7.33 |
| Registered electors | | 2,575 | | ▼26 |
| Turnout | | 1,514 | 58.80 | ▼0.91 |
| Rejected ballots | | 5 | 0.33 | ▼0.19 |
| Conservative hold | | | | |

=== Eltham Park ===
Eltham Park (2)
| Party | Candidate | Votes | % | ±% |
|---|---|---|---|---|
| Conservative | Dermot Poston* (Note: Poston replaced Cllr Kear after his disqualification in 1992) | 1,327 | 43.43 | ▲6.12 |
| Conservative | James Simpson | 1,179 | | |
| Labour | Iris Bydawell | 1,070 | 34.38 | ▲8.59 |
| Labour | John Kell | 913 | | |
| Liberal Democrats | Kelly John | 640 | 22.18 | ▲12.87 |
| Registered electors | | 4,765 | | ▼507 |
| Turnout | | 2,864 | 60.10 | ▼1.51 |
| Rejected ballots | | 4 | 0.14 | ▼0.04 |
| Conservative hold | | | | |
| Conservative hold | | | | |

=== Eynsham ===
Eynsham (2)
| Party | Candidate | Votes | % | ±% |
|---|---|---|---|---|
| SDP | John Rastall* | 1,239 | 58.95 | ▼13.90 |
| SDP | Barrie Groves* | 1,205 | | |
| Labour | Edward Fitzpatrick | 877 | 41.05 | ▲2.71 |
| Labour | Edward Claridge^{†} (Note: Claridge was a sitting councillor representing the Thameshead Moorings) | 824 | | |
| Registered electors | | 4,268 | | ▼572 |
| Turnout | | 2,185 | 51.19 | ▼0.57 |
| Rejected ballots | | 3 | 0.14 | ▲0.06 |
| SDP hold | | | | |
| SDP hold | | | | |

=== Ferrier ===
Ferrier (2)
| Party | Candidate | Votes | % | ±% |
|---|---|---|---|---|
| Labour | Deborah Smith^{†} (Note: Smith was a sitting councillor representing the St Alfege) | 1,108 | 61.90 | ▼15.98 |
| Labour | Michael Yates | 972 | | |
| Liberal Democrats | Yvonne Bonavia | 331 | 19.70 | New |
| Conservative | Valerie Antcliffe | 326 | 18.39 | ▲2.18 |
| Conservative | Margaret Campbell-Smith | 291 | | |
| Registered electors | | 4,160 | | ▼342 |
| Turnout | | 1,744 | 41.92 | ▼0.49 |
| Rejected ballots | | 7 | 0.40 | ▲0.19 |
| Labour hold | | | | |
| Labour hold | | | | |

=== Glyndon ===
Glyndon (2)
| Party | Candidate | Votes | % | ±% |
|---|---|---|---|---|
| Labour | Donald Austen | 1,464 | 82.18 | ▲37.55 |
| Labour | John Wakefield | 1,183 | | |
| Conservative | Joyce Bowe | 314 | 17.82 | ▲6.58 |
| Conservative | Jean Cooper | 259 | | |
| Registered electors | | 5,035 | | ▼705 |
| Turnout | | 1,966 | 39.05 | ▼3.60 |
| Rejected ballots | | 25 | 1.27 | ▲1.15 |
| Labour hold | | | | |
| Labour hold | | | | |

=== Herbert ===
Herbert (2)
| Party | Candidate | Votes | % | ±% |
|---|---|---|---|---|
| Labour | Samuel Coker* | 1,073 | 46.42 | ▲2.07 |
| Labour | Simon Oelman | 882 | | |
| Conservative | James O'Connor | 608 | 26.58 | ▼0.72 |
| Conservative | Wendy Richards | 511 | | |
| Liberal Democrats | Christopher Ring | 342 | 16.23 | ▲5.85 |
| Green | Jan Ryan | 227 | 10.77 | ▼2.69 |
| Registered electors | | 4,930 | | ▼241 |
| Turnout | | 2,088 | 42.35 | ▼5.32 |
| Rejected ballots | | 8 | 0.38 | ▲0.10 |
| Labour hold | | | | |
| Labour hold | | | | |

=== Hornfair ===
Hornfair (2)
| Party | Candidate | Votes | % | ±% |
|---|---|---|---|---|
| Labour | Janet Gillman | 1,377 | 65.07 | ▲17.93 |
| Labour | Robert Lewis* | 1,309 | | |
| Liberal Democrats | Walter Mayhew | 417 | 20.20 | New |
| Conservative | Elizabeth Maisey | 327 | 14.73 | ▼2.08 |
| Conservative | Jeffrey Upward | 281 | | |
| Registered electors | | 4,564 | | ▼410 |
| Turnout | | 2,170 | 47.55 | ▼8.14 |
| Rejected ballots | | 8 | 0.37 | ▲0.15 |
| Labour hold | | | | |
| Labour hold | | | | |

=== Kidbrooke ===
Kidbrooke (2)
| Party | Candidate | Votes | % | ±% |
|---|---|---|---|---|
| Labour | Norman Adams^{†} (Note: Adams was a sitting councillor representing the Rectory Field) | 1,051 | 39.30 | ▼3.94 |
| Labour | Sabiha Shahzad^{†} (Note: Shahzad was a sitting councillor representing the West ward) | 814 | | |
| Conservative | Raymond Maisey | 660 | 26.45 | ▼3.54 |
| Conservative | Michael Vickery | 596 | | |
| Fellowship | Ronald Mallone | 468 | 19.71 | ▲6.99 |
| Liberal Democrats | Alfred Andrews | 396 | 14.53 | New |
| Liberal Democrats | Janet Cave-Browne-Cave | 294 | | |
| Registered electors | | 4,587 | | ▼305 |
| Turnout | | 2,236 | 48.75 | ▼11.65 |
| Rejected ballots | | 4 | 0.18 | ▼0.09 |
| Labour hold | | | | |
| Labour gain from Conservative | | | | |

=== Lakedale ===
Lakedale (2)
| Party | Candidate | Votes | % | ±% |
|---|---|---|---|---|
| Labour | Adele Gordon-Peiniger^{†} (Note: Gordon-Peiniger was a sitting councillor representing the St Alfege ward) | 1,122 | 65.60 | ▲16.59 |
| Labour | Sajid Jawaid* | 1,090 | | |
| Liberal Democrats | Judith Pinnington | 362 | 21.47 | New |
| Conservative | Julia Beaman | 223 | 12.93 | ▲2.25 |
| Conservative | Frances Stephens | 213 | | |
| Registered electors | | 4,442 | | ▼354 |
| Turnout | | 1,836 | 41.33 | ▼4.50 |
| Rejected ballots | | 6 | 0.33 | ▲0.10 |
| Labour hold | | | | |
| Labour hold | | | | |

=== Middle Park ===
Middle Park (2)
| Party | Candidate | Votes | % | ±% |
|---|---|---|---|---|
| Labour | Robert Harris* | 1,431 | 59.95 | ▲0.90 |
| Labour | Barry Taylor | 1,256 | | |
| Conservative | Zita Wiltshire | 488 | 21.19 | New |
| Conservative | Paul Stephens | 461 | | |
| Liberal Democrats | Deana Jobling | 308 | 13.74 | ▼5.27 |
| Independent | Andrew Graham | 115 | 5.13 | New |
| Registered electors | | 4,969 | | ▼348 |
| Turnout | | 2,340 | 47.09 | ▲1.22 |
| Rejected ballots | | 7 | 0.30 | ▼1.52 |
| Labour hold | | | | |
| Labour hold | | | | |

=== New Eltham ===
New Eltham (2)
| Party | Candidate | Votes | % | ±% |
|---|---|---|---|---|
| Conservative | Dorothy Mepsted* | 1,149 | 42.28 | ▼4.26 |
| Labour | Peter May | 1,132 | 40.37 | ▲11.63 |
| Conservative | Martin Gooding* | 1,073 | | |
| Labour | Patrick Pridham | 990 | | |
| Liberal Democrats | Kathleen Hannigan | 458 | 17.35 | ▼7.77 |
| Liberal Democrats | John Slater | 454 | | |
| Registered electors | | 5,078 | | ▼463 |
| Turnout | | 2,808 | 55.30 | ▼2.23 |
| Rejected ballots | | 3 | 0.11 | ▼0.27 |
| Conservative hold | | | | |
| Labour gain from Conservative | | | | |

=== Nightingale ===
Nightingale (1)
| Party | Candidate | Votes | % | ±% |
|---|---|---|---|---|
| Labour | Keith Scott | 642 | 69.86 | ▲4.06 |
| Conservative | Sheila Mudie | 171 | 18.61 | ▲6.47 |
| Liberal Democrats | Ronald Foster | 106 | 11.53 | ▲2.28 |
| Registered electors | | 2,439 | | ▼53 |
| Turnout | | 920 | 37.72 | ▼4.33 |
| Rejected ballots | | 3 | 0.33 | ▼0.24 |
| Labour hold | | | | |

=== Palace ===
Palace (1)
| Party | Candidate | Votes | % | ±% |
|---|---|---|---|---|
| Conservative | Peter King* | 644 | 44.91 | ▼2.85 |
| Labour | Terry Quinn | 557 | 38.84 | ▲9.88 |
| Liberal Democrats | Peter Churchill | 233 | 16.25 | ▲7.59 |
| Registered electors | | 2,847 | | ▲97 |
| Turnout | | 1,436 | 50.44 | ▼0.87 |
| Rejected ballots | | 2 | 0.14 | Steady |
| Conservative hold | | | | |

=== Plumstead Common ===
Plumstead Common (1)
| Party | Candidate | Votes | % | ±% |
|---|---|---|---|---|
| Labour | Victoria Morse* | 918 | 66.43 | ▲13.95 |
| Liberal Democrats | Paula Mitchell | 291 | 21.06 | New |
| Conservative | Kenneth Bailey | 173 | 12.52 | ▼2.70 |
| Registered electors | | 2,653 | | ▼136 |
| Turnout | | 1,384 | 52.17 | ▲0.07 |
| Rejected ballots | | 2 | 0.14 | ▲0.07 |
| Labour hold | | | | |

=== Rectory Field ===
Rectory Field (2)
| Party | Candidate | Votes | % | ±% |
|---|---|---|---|---|
| Labour | Irene Hogben^{†} (Note: Hogben was a sitting councillor representing the Hornfair ward) | 1,152 | 55.01 | ▲11.77 |
| Labour | Derek Steedman | 1,056 | | |
| Liberal Democrats | Alexander Grigg | 365 | 18.19 | New |
| Green | David Sharman | 291 | 14.50 | ▲6.29 |
| Conservative | Hugh Harris | 248 | 12.31 | ▼2.79 |
| Conservative | Judith Vickery | 245 | | |
| Registered electors | | 4,313 | | ▼423 |
| Turnout | | 1,877 | 43.52 | ▼7.32 |
| Rejected ballots | | 3 | 0.16 | ▼0.05 |
| Labour hold | | | | |
| Labour hold | | | | |

=== St Alfege ===
St Alfege (2)
| Party | Candidate | Votes | % | ±% |
|---|---|---|---|---|
| Labour | Christopher Roberts | 1,055 | 49.04 | ▲7.51 |
| Labour | Kantabai Patel^{†} (Note: Patel was a sitting councillor representing the Herbert) | 934 | | |
| Liberal Democrats | Shirley Broad | 474 | 20.96 | New |
| Liberal Democrats | Christopher McGinty | 356 | | |
| Conservative | Geraldine Aust | 325 | 16.06 | ▼6.37 |
| Conservative | Realph Norland | 310 | | |
| Green | Clare Palmer | 276 | 13.94 | ▲4.60 |
| Registered electors | | 4,464 | | ▼281 |
| Turnout | | 2,030 | 45.47 | ▼3.97 |
| Rejected ballots | | 3 | 0.15 | ▲0.11 |
| Labour hold | | | | |
| Labour hold | | | | |

=== St Mary's ===
St Mary's (2)
| Party | Candidate | Votes | % | ±% |
|---|---|---|---|---|
| Labour | Brian O'Sullivan* | 1,047 | 68.13 | ▲16.40 |
| Labour | John Fahy* | 996 | | |
| Liberal Democrats | Michael Nevin | 261 | 17.40 | New |
| Conservative | Harry Barnes | 231 | 14.47 | New |
| Conservative | John Harvey-Bailey | 203 | | |
| Registered electors | | 4,687 | | ▼149 |
| Turnout | | 1,609 | 34.33 | ▼5.19 |
| Rejected ballots | | 8 | 0.50 | ▼0.23 |
| Labour hold | | | | |
| Labour hold | | | | |

=== St Nicholas ===
St Nicholas (2)
| Party | Candidate | Votes | % | ±% |
|---|---|---|---|---|
| Labour | Annette Barratt^{†} (Note: Barratt was a sitting councillor representing the Slade ward) | 1,240 | 63.15 | ▲20.33 |
| Labour | Claudia Slee | 1,036 | | |
| Liberal Democrats | David Hall | 468 | 24.03 | New |
| Liberal Democrats | Thomas Headon | 398 | | |
| Conservative | Peter Manns | 237 | 12.82 | ▼3.06 |
| Conservative | Stephen Tough | 225 | | |
| Registered electors | | 4,755 | | ▼442 |
| Turnout | | 2,028 | 42.65 | ▼5.17 |
| Rejected ballots | | 7 | 0.35 | ▲0.15 |
| Labour hold | | | | |
| Labour hold | | | | |

=== Sherard ===
Sherard (2)
| Party | Candidate | Votes | % | ±% |
|---|---|---|---|---|
| Labour | Michael Hayes | 1,490 | 58.65 | ▼2.37 |
| Labour | Quentin Marsh* | 1,445 | | |
| Conservative | Charles Joel | 389 | 15.38 | New |
| Conservative | Hilda Smith | 380 | | |
| Liberal Democrats | Andrew Price | 326 | 13.02 | New |
| BNP | William Hitches | 324 | 12.94 | New |
| Registered electors | | 5,116 | | ▼391 |
| Turnout | | 2,514 | 49.14 | ▲1.64 |
| Rejected ballots | | 4 | 0.16 | ▼1.83 |
| Labour hold | | | | |
| Labour hold | | | | |

=== Shrewsbury ===
Shrewsbury (1)
| Party | Candidate | Votes | % | ±% |
|---|---|---|---|---|
| Labour | Michael Hayes | 701 | 49.16 | ▲24.84 |
| Conservative | Lewis Sergeant* | 570 | 39.97 | ▲4.83 |
| Liberal Democrats | Edward Ottery | 155 | 10.87 | New |
| Registered electors | | 2,355 | | ▼130 |
| Turnout | | 1,428 | 60.64 | ▼3.42 |
| Rejected ballots | | 2 | 0.14 | ▲0.08 |
| Labour gain from Conservative | | | | |

=== Slade ===
Slade (2)
| Party | Candidate | Votes | % | ±% |
|---|---|---|---|---|
| Labour | Christopher Evans | 1,321 | 45.43 | ▲7.96 |
| Liberal Democrats | David Woodhead | 1,295 | 45.29 | ▲11.21 |
| Liberal Democrats | John Hagyard | 1,232 | | |
| Labour | Joga Minhas | 1,214 | | |
| Conservative | Gregory Beaman | 273 | 9.28 | ▼9.03 |
| Conservative | Michael McGonagle | 244 | | |
| Registered electors | | 5,010 | | ▼170 |
| Turnout | | 2,976 | 59.40 | ▲1.10 |
| Rejected ballots | | 4 | 0.13 | ▲0.03 |
| Labour hold | | | | |
| Liberal Democrats gain from Labour | | | | |

=== Sutcliffe ===
Sutcliffe (1)
| Party | Candidate | Votes | % | ±% |
|---|---|---|---|---|
| Liberal Democrats | Brian Woodcraft* | 855 | 55.70 | ▲14.83 |
| Conservative | Katherine Robertson | 375 | 24.43 | ▼7.77 |
| Labour | Stephen Brundish | 305 | 19.87 | ▼3.05 |
| Registered electors | | 2,678 | | ▼14 |
| Turnout | | 1,538 | 57.43 | ▼3.94 |
| Rejected ballots | | 2 | 0.13 | ▲0.01 |
| Liberal Democrats hold | | | | |

=== Tarn ===
Tarn (1)
| Party | Candidate | Votes | % | ±% |
|---|---|---|---|---|
| Conservative | Derek Richards* | 525 | 45.73 | ▼4.45 |
| Labour | Peter Willsman | 415 | 36.15 | ▲4.85 |
| Liberal Democrats | Sara Churchill | 208 | 18.12 | ▲9.62 |
| Registered electors | | 2,440 | | ▼140 |
| Turnout | | 1,151 | 47.17 | ▼6.28 |
| Rejected ballots | | 3 | 0.26 | ▲0.19 |
| Conservative hold | | | | |

=== Thamesmead Moorings ===
Thamesmead Moorings (2)
| Party | Candidate | Votes | % | ±% |
|---|---|---|---|---|
| Labour | Claude Ramsey | 1,015 | 61.23 | ▲16.88 |
| Labour | Peter Kotz | 968 | | |
| Liberal Democrats | Barbara Crook | 327 | 20.19 | New |
| Conservative | Emily King | 174 | 10.25 | ▲2.18 |
| Conservative | Emily Bennett | 157 | | |
| Independent | Sami Salih | 135 | 8.33 | New |
| Registered electors | | 4,815 | | ▼182 |
| Turnout | | 1,664 | 34.56 | ▼5.96 |
| Rejected ballots | | 2 | 0.12 | ▲0.02 |
| Labour hold | | | | |
| Labour hold | | | | |

=== Trafalgar ===
Trafalgar (2)
| Party | Candidate | Votes | % | ±% |
|---|---|---|---|---|
| Labour | Marian Moseley* (Note: Moseley replaced Cllr Taylor after his resignation in 1993) | 1,289 | 63.67 | ▲14.26 |
| Labour | James Gillman^{†} (Note: Gillman was a sitting councillor representing the Ferrier ward) | 1,234 | | |
| Liberal Democrats | Anthony Renouf | 323 | 16.30 | ▲12.08 |
| Liberal Democrats | John Stride | 323 | | |
| Conservative | Patricia Rabbitt | 209 | 9.79 | ▼3.76 |
| Green | Valerie Blomfield | 203 | 10.24 | ▲2.05 |
| Conservative | Maureen Robinson | 179 | | |
| Registered electors | | 4,690 | | ▼395 |
| Turnout | | 2,090 | 44.56 | ▼4.33 |
| Rejected ballots | | 2 | 0.10 | ▼0.06 |
| Labour hold | | | | |
| Labour hold | | | | |

=== Vanburgh ===
Vanbrugh (2)
| Party | Candidate | Votes | % | ±% |
|---|---|---|---|---|
| Labour | Anthony Moon* | 1,104 | 49.32 | ▲12.53 |
| Labour | Richard Rudkin | 1,080 | | |
| Conservative | Stephanie Pugh | 539 | 23.85 | ▼1.37 |
| Conservative | Jacqueline | 517 | | |
| Liberal Democrats | Stuart Davis | 426 | 17.61 | ▲11.63 |
| Liberal Democrats | Roderick Rhys Jones | 354 | | |
| Green | Donald Nicholls | 204 | 9.21 | ▲0.10 |
| Registered electors | | 4,703 | | ▼144 |
| Turnout | | 2,236 | 47.54 | ▼6.29 |
| Rejected ballots | | 5 | 0.22 | ▲0.14 |
| Labour hold | | | | |
| Labour hold | | | | |

=== Well Hall ===
Well Hall (2)
| Party | Candidate | Votes | % | ±% |
|---|---|---|---|---|
| Labour | Clive Efford* | 1,601 | 51.93 | ▲10.48 |
| Labour | Raymond Walker | 1,461 | | |
| Conservative | Philip Dean* | 1,095 | 35.55 | ▼4.79 |
| Conservative | Dingle Clark | 1,000 | | |
| Liberal Democrats | Dennis Hawkes | 369 | 12.52 | ▲5.10 |
| Registered electors | | 5,039 | | ▼23 |
| Turnout | | 2,981 | 59.16 | ▲12.93 |
| Rejected ballots | | 10 | 0.34 | Steady |
| Labour hold | | | | |
| Labour gain from Conservative | | | | |

=== West ===
West (2)
| Party | Candidate | Votes | % | ±% |
|---|---|---|---|---|
| Labour | William Strong* | 1,063 | 65.50 | ▲12.49 |
| Labour | Jagir Sekhon | 923 | | |
| Liberal Democrats | Ricarda O'Driscoll | 349 | 20.91 | New |
| Liberal Democrats | Frances Woodward | 284 | | |
| Conservative | Roger Gough | 206 | 13.59 | ▲0.75 |
| Conservative | Norman Gough | 205 | | |
| Registered electors | | 4,032 | | ▲305 |
| Turnout | | 1,699 | 42.14 | ▲12.41 |
| Rejected ballots | | 2 | 0.12 | ▼0.15 |
| Labour hold | | | | |
| Labour hold | | | | |

=== Woolwich Common ===
Woolwich Common (2)
| Party | Candidate | Votes | % | ±% |
|---|---|---|---|---|
| Labour | Henry Pike* | 1,074 | 65.12 | ▲19.46 |
| Labour | Gurdip Dhillon* | 1,024 | | |
| Conservative | Alan Reed | 328 | 19.24 | ▼7.95 |
| Conservative | Daphnee Marshall | 292 | | |
| Green | Elizabeth Angas | 252 | 15.64 | ▲10.26 |
| Registered electors | | 4,299 | | ▼2,486 |
| Turnout | | 1,709 | 39.75 | ▲5.25 |
| Rejected ballots | | 7 | 0.41 | ▲0.24 |
| Labour hold | | | | |
| Labour hold | | | | |
