= 1990 Greenwich London Borough Council election =

1990 local election in England

- 3 May 1990

62 seats for election to Greenwich London Borough Council 32 seats needed for a majority
- Registered: 157,515
- Turnout: 80,568, 51.15%
	First party	Second party	Third party
Party	Labour	Conservative	SDP
Seats won	44	12	4
Seat change	▲1	Steady	Steady
Popular vote	59,701	28,689	21,135
Percentage	43.60%	20.95%	15.44%
	Fourth party	Fifth party
Party	Liberal Democrats	Valley Party
Seats won	2 (Note: Includes results from candidates registered as "Lib Dem Focus Team)	0
Seat change	▼1	Steady
Popular vote	6,381	14,838
Percentage	4.66%	10.84%
Before election before election
Labour
Council control after election
Labour

The 1990 Greenwich Council election took place on 3 May 1990 to elect members of Greenwich London Borough Council in London, England. The whole council was up for election and the Labour party stayed in overall control of the council.

== Election result ==
1990 Greenwich London Borough Council elections
Party	Seats	Gains	Losses	Net gain/loss	Seats %	Votes %	Votes	+/−
Labour	44	5	4	▲1	70.97	43.60	59,701	
Conservative	12	2	2	Steady	19.35	20.95	28,689	
SDP	4	2	2	Steady	6.45	15.44	21,135	
Liberal Democrats	2	1	2	▼1	3.23	4.66	6,381	
Valley Party	0	0	0	Steady	0.00	10.84	14,838	
Green	0	0	0	Steady	0.00	3.20	4,379	
Independent	0	0	0	Steady	0.00	0.77	1,047	
Fellowship	0	0	0	Steady	0.00	0.30	415	
Asian Council on Local Affairs	0	0	0	Steady	0.00	0.18	246	
Independent Labour	0	0	0	Steady	0.00	0.06	85	
Total	62						136,916	

== Ward results ==
(*) - Indicates an incumbent candidate

(†) - Indicates an incumbent candidate that is standing in a different ward

=== Abbey Wood ===
Abbey Wood (2)
Party	Candidate	Votes	%
SDP	David Lewis	1,418	48.64
SDP	Terence Malone*	1,411	
Labour	John Wakefield	1,050	33.69
Labour	Joga Minhas	910	
Valley Party	Gwendoline King	347	11.83
Valley Party	Alexander Hayes	341	
Green	Jean Weston	170	5.84
Registered electors		5,613	
Turnout		3,045	54.25
Rejected ballots		11	0.36
SDP hold			
SDP hold			

=== Arsenal ===
Arsenal (1)
Party	Candidate	Votes	%
Labour	Lance Mulcahy*	575	53.89
SDP	Julia Costello	290	27.18
Valley Party	Mark Mansfield	162	15.18
Green	Alan Cannon	40	3.75
Registered electors		2,776	
Turnout		1,071	38.58
Rejected ballots		5	0.47
Labour hold			

=== Avery Hill ===
Avery Hill (1)
Party	Candidate	Votes	%
Liberal Democrats	Edward Randall*	1,042	62.40
Labour	Raymond Walker	304	18.20
Conservative	Douglas Spooner	236	14.13
Valley Party	David Fox	88	5.27
Registered electors		2,638	
Turnout		1,674	63.46
Rejected ballots		4	0.24
Liberal Democrats hold			

=== Blackheath ===
Blackheath (2)
Party	Candidate	Votes	%
Conservative	Geoffrey Brighty	1,127	38.77
Conservative	Robin Henderson*	1,116	
Labour	Claude Ramsey	655	22.46
Labour	Anthony Maduagwu	644	
SDP	Vivienne Stone	603	20.32
SDP	Judith Abbott	573	
Green	Robert McCracken	382	13.20
Valley Party	Patrick Bristow	152	5.25
Valley Party	Anthony Fowles	151	
Registered electors		5,068	
Turnout		2,824	55.72
Rejected ballots		3	0.11
Conservative hold			
Conservative hold			

=== Burrage ===
Burrage (1)
Party	Candidate	Votes	%
Labour	Leonard Duvall	697	58.72
SDP	Denise Gilbert	232	19.54
Valley Party	Shaun Edwards	125	10.53
Green	Margaret Bynorth	91	7.67
Asian Council on Local Affairs	Rajwant Sidhu	42	3.54
Registered electors		2,690	
Turnout		1,193	44.35
Rejected ballots		6	0.50
Labour hold			

=== Charlton ===
Charlton (2)
Party	Candidate	Votes	%
Labour	David Picton*	1,288	49.69
Labour	Sukdhev Sanghara	1,136	
SDP	Andrew Lines	433	15.58
Conservative	Silvio Bentram	353	12.96
Valley Party	Brian Bird	352	12.91
SDP	Sanu Miah	326	
Conservative	Eve Jagusiewicz-Haines	279	
Valley Party	Dominic Crowe	277	
Green	Thomas Cunliffe	216	8.86
Registered electors		4,730	
Turnout		2,537	53.64
Rejected ballots		1	0.04
Labour hold			
Labour hold			

=== Coldharbour ===
Coldharbour (2)
Party	Candidate	Votes	%
Labour	William G.R. Jeavons*	1,150	42.17
Labour	Peter Challis^{†} (Note: Challis was a sitting councillor for the Nightingale ward)	1,108	
Conservative	Janet Parrett	1,004	36.50
Conservative	Colin Rutt	949	
Valley Party	Robert Weeks	296	10.94
Valley Party	Wendy Perfect	290	
Liberal Democrats	Peter Churchill	278	10.39
Registered electors		4,815	
Turnout		2,739	56.88
Rejected ballots		3	0.11
Labour hold			
Labour hold			

=== Deansfield ===
Deansfield (1)
Party	Candidate	Votes	%
Conservative	Alec Miles*	743	48.03
Labour	James Draper	496	32.06
Valley Party	Victor Skinner	163	10.54
Liberal Democrats	Shirley Broad	145	9.37
Registered electors		2,601	
Turnout		1,553	59.71
Rejected ballots		8	0.52
Conservative hold			

=== Eltham Park ===
Eltham Park (2)
Party	Candidate	Votes	%
Conservative	Wendy Mitchell*	1,412	37.31
Conservative	Kenneth Kear*	1,290	
Labour	Judith Harrington	981	25.79
Labour	Stephen Slater	887	
Independent	Eileen Guthrie	490	13.53
Liberal Democrats	John Hagyarrd	337	9.31
Valley Party	Andrew Crouch	297	7.02
Green	Jennifer Thornley	255	7.04
Valley Party	Stephen Perfect	211	
Registered electors		5,272	
Turnout		3,248	61.61
Rejected ballots		6	0.18
Conservative hold			
Conservative hold			

=== Eynsham ===
Eynsham (2)
Party	Candidate	Votes	%
SDP	John Rastall	1,115	45.05
SDP	Barrie Groves	1,102	
Labour	Edward Fitzpatrick	1,037	38.34
Labour	Simon Oelman*	851	
Valley Party	Christopher Budgen	195	6.78
Conservative	Joseph Sinfield	159	6.46
Valley Party	Barry Nugent	139	
Green	Rima Mutimer	83	3.37
Registered electors		4,840	
Turnout		2,505	51.76
Rejected ballots		2	0.08
SDP gain from Labour			
SDP gain from Labour			

=== Ferrier ===
Ferrier (2)
Party	Candidate	Votes	%
Labour	James Gillman^{†} (Note: Gillman was a sitting councillor for the Hornfair ward)	860	45.92
Labour	Edward McParland*	827	
SDP	Melanie Fletcher	369	18.23
Conservative	Valerie Antcliffe	311	16.21
SDP	Simon Millson	301	
Conservative	Margaret Campbell-Smith	294	
Valley Party	Kevin Merrick	199	10.39
Valley Party	Nigel Taylor	182	
Green	Donald Caliendo	170	9.25
Registered electors		4,502	
Turnout		1,865	41.43
Rejected ballots		4	0.21
Labour hold			
Labour hold			

=== Glyndon ===
Glyndon (2)
Party	Candidate	Votes	%
Labour	Clare Cronin	1,210	44.63
Labour	Satish Rai	910	
SDP	Hilary Newton	579	23.75
SDP	Michael Jahans	548	
Valley Party	Craig Harwood	303	11.16
Conservative	Jean Cooper	267	11.24
Valley Party	John Morris	226	
Green	Euan McPhee	180	7.58
Asian Council on Local Affairs	Ravji Pindora	39	1.64
Registered electors		5,740	
Turnout		2,448	42.65
Rejected ballots		3	0.12
Labour hold			
Labour gain from SDP			

=== Herbert ===
Herbert (2)
Party	Candidate	Votes	%
Labour	Samuel Coker	1,019	37.10
Labour	Kantabai Patel*	833	
Conservative	John O'Brian	702	27.40
Conservative	Charles Garth	665	
Green	Brian Barnett	336	13.46
Valley Party	Richard Ayers	334	11.66
Liberal Democrats	Edward Ottery	259	10.38
Valley Party	Nicholas Bulien	248	
Registered electors		5,171	
Turnout		2,465	47.67
Rejected ballots		7	0.28
Labour hold			
Labour hold			

=== Hornfair ===
Hornfair (2)
Party	Candidate	Votes	%
Labour	Irene Hogben	1,261	47.14
Labour	Robert Lewis	1,241	
SDP	John O'Keefe	474	17.14
Conservative	Derek Lamb	462	16.81
SDP	Sylvia Ross	435	
Conservative	Sheila Striling	429	
Valley Party	Andrew Keen	404	13.90
Valley Party	Leslie Turner	334	
Green	Stephen Reeves	133	5.01
Registered electors		4,974	
Turnout		2,770	55.69
Rejected ballots		6	0.22
Labour hold			
Labour hold			

=== Kidbrooke ===
Kidbrooke (2)
Party	Candidate	Votes	%
Labour	James Coughlan*	1,033	30.79
Conservative	Giles Brennand	990	29.99
Labour	Martin Rogers	977	
Conservative	Hugh Harris	967	
Fellowship	Ronald Mallone	415	12.72
SDP	Irene Hegg	400	11.61
SDP	Eileen McNeill	357	
Valley Party	Robert Taylor	326	9.99
Green	Tania Caliendo	160	4.90
Registered electors		4,892	
Turnout		2,955	60.40
Rejected ballots		8	0.27
Labour hold			
Conservative gain from Labour			

=== Lakedale ===
Lakedale (2)
Party	Candidate	Votes	%
Labour	Ashrath Francis	1,105	49.01
Labour	Sajid Jawaid	1,033	
SDP	Patricia Smith	438	19.67
SDP	Carol Wilson	419	
Conservative	Emily Bennett	233	10.68
Valley Party	Brian Smart	178	8.07
Valley Party	Roger Taylor	174	
Asian Council on Local Affairs	Babubhai Master	165	7.57
Green	Satya Kaur	124	5.00
Green	Shiv Singh	93	
Registered electors		4,796	
Turnout		2,198	45.83
Rejected ballots		5	0.23
Labour hold			
Labour hold			

=== Middle Park ===
Middle Park (2)
Party	Candidate	Votes	%
Labour	Philip Graham^{†} (Note: Graham was a sitting councillor representing the Eynsham ward)	1,338	59.05
Labour	Robert Harris	1,283	
Valley Party	Paul Ellis	576	21.94
Liberal Democrats	Richard Shayler	422	19.01
Valley Party	Christopher Wilkins	398	
Registered electors		5,317	
Turnout		2,439	45.87
Rejected ballots		37	1.52
Labour hold			
Labour hold			

=== New Eltham ===
New Eltham (2)
Party	Candidate	Votes	%
Conservative	Dorothy Mepsted*	1,341	38.02
Conservative	Martin Gooding	1,238	
Labour	Paul Harrington	976	28.74
Labour	Alexander Stratton	973	
Independent	Christopher Nicklin	506	14.91
Valley Party	Jonathan Bangs	370	8.75
Liberal Democrats	Paul Hurren	325	9.58
Valley Party	Evalyn Waterman	224	
Registered electors		5,541	
Turnout		3,188	57.53
Rejected ballots		12	0.38
Conservative hold			
Conservative hold			

=== Nightingale ===
Nightingale (1)
Party	Candidate	Votes	%
Labour	Andrew Gordon	683	65.80
Valley Party	Peter Finch	133	12.81
Conservative	Roy Mapes	126	12.14
Liberal Democrats	Trevor Wilkins	96	9.25
Registered electors		2,492	
Turnout		1,048	42.05
Rejected ballots		6	0.57
Labour hold			

=== Palace ===
Palace (1)
Party	Candidate	Votes	%
Conservative	Peter King*	673	47.76
Labour	Thomas Carter	408	28.96
Liberal Democrats	Joan Macqueen	122	8.66
Valley Party	John West	116	8.23
Green	Patrick Pridham	90	6.39
Registered electors		2,750	
Turnout		1,411	51.31
Rejected ballots		2	0.14
Conservative hold			

=== Plumstead Common ===
Plumstead Common (1)
Party	Candidate	Votes	%
Labour	Victoria Morse	762	52.48
SDP	Doris Horne	269	18.53
Conservative	Elsie Frost	221	15.22
Valley Party	Darren Risby	118	8.12
Green	Julia Cowdell	82	5.65
Registered electors		2,789	
Turnout		1,453	52.10
Rejected ballots		1	0.07
Labour hold			

=== Rectory Field ===
Rectory Field (2)
Party	Candidate	Votes	%
Labour	Victor Farlie*	1,016	43.24
Labour	Norman Adams*	1,005	
SDP	Richard Hewson	529	21.22
SDP	Roderick Wright	462	
Conservative	Paul Cummins	382	15.10
Conservative	Zita Martinez	323	
Valley Party	Sandra Pace	286	12.23
Valley Party	Paul Messeter	285	
Green	David Sharman	192	8.21
Registered electors		4,736	
Turnout		2,408	50.84
Rejected ballots		5	0.21
Labour hold			
Labour hold			

=== St Alfege ===
St Alfege (2)
Party	Candidate	Votes	%
Labour	Adele Gordon-Peiniger	966	41.53
Labour	Deborah Smith	937	
Conservative	David Binsted	539	22.43
Conservative	Tamara Martinez	489	
SDP	Norman Marcus	461	18.06
SDP	Lilly Stuart	367	
Green	Anthony Pearson	214	9.34
Valley Party	Adam Beales	198	8.64
Valley Party	Brian Smith	198	
Registered electors		4,745	
Turnout		2,346	49.44
Rejected ballots		1	0.04
Labour hold			
Labour hold			

=== St Mary's ===
St Mary's (2)
Party	Candidate	Votes	%
Labour	John Fahy	952	51.73
Labour	Brian O' Sullivan*	934	
SDP	Terry McElroy	436	21.39
SDP	Ronald Morgan-Welldone	343	
Valley Party	David Long	329	17.66
Valley Party	Danny Hayes	315	
Green	Kim Brown	168	9.22
Registered electors		4,836	
Turnout		1,911	39.52
Rejected ballots		14	0.73
Labour hold			
Labour hold			

=== St Nicholas ===
St Nicholas (2)
Party	Candidate	Votes	%
Labour	Roger Hook	1,072	42.82
Labour	Thelma Purcell	949	
SDP	Pamela Carter	582	22.66
SDP	Ramon Martin	488	
Conservative	Joan Harvey-Bailey	391	15.88
Conservative	Peter Manns	359	
Valley Party	Scott Forrest	239	9.70
Valley Party	Cliver Collett	218	
Green	Simon Baines	211	8.94
Registered electors		5,197	
Turnout		2,485	47.82
Rejected ballots		5	0.20
Labour hold			
Labour hold			

=== Sherard ===
Sherard (2)
Party	Candidate	Votes	%
Labour	Robert Callow* (Note: Callow replaced Cllr Jeffrey after their resignation in 1987)	1,744	61.02
Labour	Quentin Marsh*	1,361	
Valley Party	Kevin Fox	992	38.98
Registered electors		5,507	
Turnout		2,616	47.50
Rejected ballots		52	1.99
Labour hold			
Labour hold			

=== Shrewsbury ===
Shrewsbury (1)
Party	Candidate	Votes	%
Conservative	Lewis Sergeant*	559	35.14
Labour	George McManus	387	24.32
SDP	Lynn Blade	375	23.57
Green	Peter Tinsley	153	9.62
Valley Party	Colin Holland	117	7.35
Registered electors		2,485	
Turnout		1,592	64.06
Rejected ballots		1	0.06
Conservative hold			

=== Slade ===
Slade (2)
Party	Candidate	Votes	%
Labour	John Austin-Walker	1,081	37.47
Labour	Annette Barratt	1,019	
Lib Dem Focus Team	David Woodhead*	961	34.08
Lib Dem Focus Team	Paula Mitchel	949	
Conservative	Joyce Bowe	514	18.31
Conservative	Anthony Salter	511	
Valley Party	Stavros Demetriades	292	10.14
Valley Party	Kenneth Dudman	275	
Registered electors		5,180	
Turnout		3,020	58.30
Rejected ballots		3	0.10
Labour gain from Lib Dem Focus Team			
Labour gain from Lib Dem Focus Team			

=== Sutcliffe ===
Sutcliffe (1)
Party	Candidate	Votes	%
Lib Dem Focus Team	Brian Woodcraft	674	40.87
Conservative	Antony Glover	531	32.20
Labour	John Shlackman	378	22.92
Valley Party	John Biggs	66	4.00
Registered electors		2,692	
Turnout		1,652	61.37
Rejected ballots		2	0.12
Lib Dem Focus Team gain from Conservative			

=== Tarn ===
Tarn (1)
Party	Candidate	Votes	%
Conservative	Derek Richards*	691	50.18
Labour	Stephen Clarke	431	31.30
Valley Party	Stephen Clarke	138	10.02
Liberal Democrats	Richard Carter	117	8.50
Registered electors		2,580	
Turnout		1,379	53.45
Rejected ballots		1	0.07
Conservative hold			

=== Thamesmead Moorings ===
Thameshead Moorings (2)
Party	Candidate	Votes	%
Labour	Edward Claridge*	926	44.35
Labour	Patricia Claridge	810	
SDP	Donald Austen*	759	35.41
SDP	George Kennedy	627	
Conservative	Stanley Fieldgate	173	8.07
Conservative	Stanley Wignall	142	
Valley Party	Simon Caddock	112	5.26
Valley Party	Bernard Taylor	93	
Green	Robin Stott	90	4.60
Independent Labour	Theodore du Sauzay	45	2.30
Registered electors		4,997	
Turnout		2,025	40.52
Rejected ballots		2	0.10
Labour gain from SDP			
Labour hold			

=== Trafalgar ===
Trafalgar (2)
Party	Candidate	Votes	%
Labour	Elizabeth Farmer*	1,203	49.41
Labour	Roger Taylor	1,161	
SDP	Beverley Elliot	375	14.09
Conservative	Robert Browne-Clayton	347	13.55
Conservative	Angela Casey	300	
SDP	Trevor Thomas	299	
Valley Party	David Archer	285	10.54
Valley Party	John Stickings	218	
Green	Martin Sewell	196	8.19
Liberal Democrats	Anthony Renouf	101	4.22
Registered electors		5,085	
Turnout		2,486	48.89
Rejected ballots		4	0.16
Labour hold			
Labour hold			

=== Vanbrugh ===
Vanbrugh (2)
Party	Candidate	Votes	%
Labour	Doreen Bigwood^{†} (Note: Bigwood was a sitting councillor representing the St Alfege ward)	1,049	36.79
Labour	Anthony Moon	921	
Conservative	Beryl Blackaby	702	25.22
Conservative	Judith Vickery	648	
SDP	Janet Grylls	354	12.40
SDP	Jacqueline Newman	310	
Green	James Plummer	244	9.11
Valley Party	Gary Hannant	196	7.10
Lib Dem Focus Team	Christopher McGinty	191	5.98
Valley Party	Craig Norris	184	
Lib Dem Focus Team	John H. Stride	129	
Independent	Trevor Allman	51	1.91
Independent Labour	Christopher Fay	40	1.49
Registered electors		4,847	
Turnout		2,609	53.83
Rejected ballots		2	0.08
Labour hold			
Labour hold			

=== Well Hall ===
Well Hall (2)
Party	Candidate	Votes	%
Labour	Clive Efford*	1,344	41.45
Conservative	Philip Dean*	1,295	40.34
Labour	Michael Hayes	1,260	
Conservative	Dingle Clark	1,238	
Valley Party	Stephen Dixon	372	10.79
Valley Party	Keith Crowhurst	305	
Liberal Democrats	Helen Wilkins	233	7.42
Registered electors		5,062	
Turnout		2,340	46.23
Rejected ballots		8	0.34
Labour gain from Conservative			
Conservative gain from Labour			

=== West ===
West (2)
Party	Candidate	Votes	%
Labour	Willkiam Strong*	1,101	53.01
Labour	Sabiha Shahzad	1,012	
SDP	James Caslake	401	18.55
SDP	Andrew Kemshell	338	
Conservative	Nicholas Gough	262	12.84
Conservative	Jeremy Wise	249	
Green	Audrey Bull	190	9.53
Valley Party	Rosina Larking	122	6.07
Valley Party	Marlon Seton	119	
Registered electors		3,727	
Turnout		1,108	29.73
Rejected ballots		3	0.27
Labour hold			
Labour hold			

=== Woolwich Common ===
Woolwich Common (2)
Party	Candidate	Votes	%
Labour	Gurdip Dhillon*	965	45.66
Labour	Henry Pike	887	
SDP	Terence O'Brien	544	26.43
SDP	Michael Slavin* (Note: Slavin replaced Cllr Smith after his resignation in 1987)	528	
Valley Party	Richard Grove	246	11.24
Conservative	Patience Salter	230	11.29
Conservative	Catherine Magonigle	227	
Valley Party	Terry Lloyd	209	
Green	James Hodgson	109	5.38
Registered electors		6,785	
Turnout		2,341	34.50
Rejected ballots		4	0.17
Labour hold			
Labour gain from SDP			
