= Hugh O'Leary =

British accountant (born 1974)

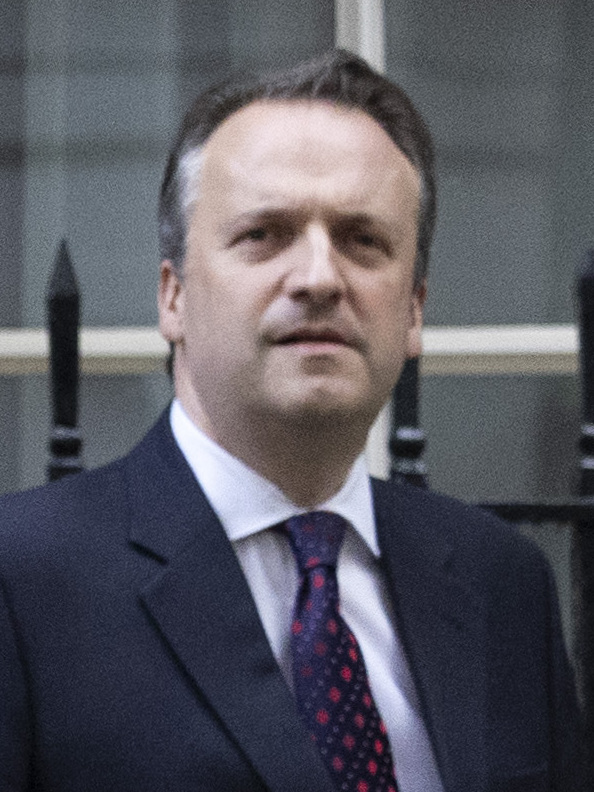
- O'Leary in 2022
- Born: Hugh Richard O'Leary; 19 July 1974 (age 52); Allerton, Liverpool, Merseyside, England
- Education: London School of Economics
- Occupation: Accountant
- Known for: Spouse of the Prime Minister of the United Kingdom
- Political party: Conservative
- Spouse: Liz Truss (m. 2000)
- Children: 2

Hugh Richard O'Leary (born 19 July 1974) is a British accountant. He is married to Liz Truss, who was Prime Minister of the United Kingdom from September to October 2022.

== Early life and education ==
O'Leary was born in Allerton, Liverpool, and raised in Heswall, on the Wirral, as the eldest of three siblings. His mother, Susan (née Dunn), was a nurse, and his father, John O'Leary, was a college lecturer who trained as a solicitor and worked for the legal firm of the Liverpool lawyer Rex Makin.

O'Leary attended Birkenhead School, where he studied Mathematics and Further Mathematics at A-level, applying unsuccessfully to Oxford University to study PPE. He went on to read econometrics and mathematical economics at the London School of Economics before becoming an accountant. Whilst at university, he was acquainted with Thérèse Coffey, who was later Liz Truss's deputy prime minister.

== Career ==
O'Leary worked as a finance director at Affinity Global Real Estate.

He has also worked at Arrakis Investments Limited, a company that, at the time, had no employees other than its one director.

== Politics ==
O'Leary has stood unsuccessfully for the Conservative Party in local elections to Greenwich London Borough Council on several occasions. At the 1998 council election he was a candidate for the Labour-held St Alfege ward. At the subsequent council election in 2002, he stood in Greenwich West; all three seats were won by the Labour Party.

He was a candidate in the 2006 Greenwich election, this time in the Charlton ward, when O'Leary and the other opposition parties finished a considerable margin behind the winning Labour candidates. At this election, his wife, Liz Truss, was elected to Eltham South ward, which she represented until 2010. O'Leary has remained active in politics as a member of the Conservatives. He stood unsuccessfully in the 2026 Greenwich London Borough Council election.

== Personal life ==
O'Leary met Truss at the 1997 Conservative Party Conference in Blackpool. The couple's first date was spent ice-skating, during which O'Leary sprained his ankle. O'Leary and Truss married in 2000; they live in Greenwich, south-east London, and the South West Norfolk constituency which Truss represented from 2010 to 2024. He stayed with Truss following her 2004–2005 extramarital affair with the Conservative MP Mark Field, which led to the breakdown of Field's marriage to his wife, Michele Acton. The couple have two daughters.

Unofficial roles
Preceded by Carrie Johnson	Spouse of the Prime Minister of the United Kingdom; 2022	Succeeded by Akshata Murty
