= Plumstead Common (ward) =

Electoral ward in the Greenwich, England

- Electoral ward for the Greenwich London Borough Council
- Borough: Greenwich
- County: Greater London
- Population: 15,169 (2021)
- Area: 3.223 km²

Current electoral ward
- Created: 2022
- Councillors: 3
- Created from: 1978-2002

Plumstead Common is an electoral ward in the Royal Borough of Greenwich. The ward recreated for the 2022 elections. It returns three councillors to Greenwich London Borough Council. It was previously used between 1978 and 2002.

== Geography ==
The ward is named after Plumstead Common.

== Councillors ==
Election	Councillors		
2022	Issy Cooke (Labour)	Nas Asghar (Labour)	Matthew Morrow (Labour)

== Elections ==
=== 2022 Greenwich London Borough Council election ===
Plumstead Common (3)
Party	Candidate	Votes	%	±%
Labour	Issy Cooke	2,194	67.7	
Labour	Nas Asghar	2,091	64.5	
Labour	Matt Morrow*	2,083	64.3	
Green	Leonie Barron	691	21.3	
Conservative	Ashley Foord	631	19.5	
Conservative	Jim Davis	617	19.0	
Conservative	Dave Robinson	581	17.9	
Green	Anji Petersen	493	15.2	
Liberal Democrats	Richard Shiel	338	10.4	
Turnout			32.4	
Labour win (new seat)				
Labour win (new seat)				
Labour win (new seat)				
