= 1986 Greenwich London Borough Council election =

1986 local election in England

- 8 May 1986

62 seats for election to Greenwich London Borough Council 32 seats needed for a majority
- Registered: 162,600
- Turnout: 47.8%
	First party	Second party	Third party
Party	Labour	Conservative	Alliance
Seats won	44	12	6
Seat change	▲1	▼4	▲3
Popular vote	62,594	36,075	34,278
Percentage	46.1%	27.5%	25.9%
	Fourth party	Fifth party	Sixth party
Party	Independent	Residents	Communist
Seats won	0	0	0
Seat change	Steady	Steady	Steady
Popular vote	455	188	24
Percentage	0.34%	0.14%	0.02%
Before election before election
Labour
Council control after election
Labour

The 1986 Greenwich Council election took place on 8 May 1986 to elect members of Greenwich London Borough Council in London, England. The whole council was up for election and the Labour party stayed in overall control of the council.

== Election result ==
1986 Greenwich London Borough Council elections
Party	Seats	Gains	Losses	Net gain/loss	Seats %	Votes %	Votes	+/−
Labour	44	4	3	▲1	70.96	46.1	62,594	
Conservative	12	0	4	▼4	25.80	27.5	36,075	
Alliance	6	3	0	▲3	9.67	25.9	34,278	
Independent	0	0	0	Steady	0.00	0.34	455	
Residents	0	0	0	Steady	0.00	0.14	188	
Communist	0	0	0	Steady	0.00	0.02	24	
Total	62						133,614	

== Ward results ==
(*) - Indicates an incumbent candidate

=== Abbey Wood ===
Abbey Wood (2)
Party	Candidate	Votes	%
Alliance	Graham L. Barnes	1,437	48.64
Alliance	Terence A.J. Malone	1,414	
Labour	John R. Wakefield*	1,085	38.0
Labour	Michael A. Yates*	1,027	
Conservative	Clifford D.U. Fletcher	333	11.7
Conservative	Catherine Fletcher	326	11.7
Turnout		5,622	50.7
Alliance gain from Labour			
Alliance gain from Labour			

=== Arsenal ===
Arsenal (1)
Party	Candidate	Votes	%
Labour	Lance G. Mulcahy	685	63.5
Alliance	Charles H. Middleton	317	29.4
Conservative	Philip M. Bowe	77	7.1
Turnout		1,079	38.2
Labour hold			

=== Avery Hill ===
Avery Hill (1)
Party	Candidate	Votes	%
Alliance	Edward J. Randall*	951	56.4
Conservative	Robert C. Howell	383	22.7
Labour	Carol A. Hibberd	353	20.9
Turnout		1,687	62.8
Alliance hold			

=== Blackheath ===
Blackheath (2)
Party	Candidate	Votes	%
Conservative	John G.C. Antcliffe	1,359	48.1
Conservative	Robin Henderson	1,293	
Labour	Iain M. Haig	771	27.3
Labour	Mary Mills	740	
Alliance	Joseph Bate	695	24.6
Alliance	Rosemary J. Hewson	695	
Turnout		5,553	54.7
Conservative hold			
Conservative hold			

=== Burrage ===
Burrage (1)
Party	Candidate	Votes	%
Labour	James Draper*	761	66.1
Alliance	Ailsa B. Potts	238	20.7
Conservative	Christine Helm	152	13.2
Turnout		1,151	41.5
Labour hold			

=== Charlton ===
Charlton (2)
Party	Candidate	Votes	%
Labour	David J.G. Picton*	1,337	63.1
Labour	Lesley A. Seary	1,286	
Conservative	Silvio P. Bertram	393	18.5
Alliance	Ibrahim Addoo	389	
Alliance	Jacqueline J.L. Newman	381	18.4
Conservative	Margaret A. May	363	
Turnout		4,149	44.7
Labour hold			
Labour hold			

=== Coldharbour ===
Coldharbour (2)
Party	Candidate	Votes	%
Labour	Thomas A. Carter*	1,174	44.1
Labour	William G.R. Jeavons*	1,123	
Conservative	Gerard P. Fergus	949	35.7
Conservative	Stanley Wignall	928	
Alliance	Frederick A. Musgrave	538	20.2
Alliance	Charles H. Parker	492	
Turnout		5,204	55.7
Labour hold			
Labour hold			

=== Deansfield ===
Deansfield (1)
Party	Candidate	Votes	%
Conservative	Alec G. Miles	859	54.8
Labour	Janice M. Marnham	442	28.2
Alliance	Qudsiyah Abideen	266	17.0
Turnout		1,567	57.1
Conservative hold			

=== Eltham Park ===
Eltham Park (2)
Party	Candidate	Votes	%
Conservative	Wendy Mitchell*	1,552	47.2
Conservative	Kenneth L. Kear*	1,453	
Alliance	Ralph S. Atkinson	770	23.4
Alliance	John Hagyard	753	
Labour	David Mason	705	21.4
Labour	Richard K. Tomiak	693	
Independent	Eileen W. Guthrie	261	7.9
Turnout		6,187	60.5
Conservative hold			
Conservative hold			

=== Eynsham ===
Eynsham (2)
Party	Candidate	Votes	%
Labour	Philip Graham*	1,208	54.9
Labour	Simon J.S. Oelman	1,163	
Alliance	Robert H. Smith	713	32.4
Alliance	Alan J. Treuge	630	
Conservative	James R. Martin	281	12.8
Conservative	Joseph Sinfield	222	
Turnout		4,217	42.8
Labour hold			
Labour hold			

=== Ferrier ===
Ferrier (2)
Party	Candidate	Votes	%
Labour	Serena M.V. Lovelace	1,145	59.0
Labour	Edward A. McParland	1,039	
Conservative	Josephine Bassett	477	24.6
Conservative	Valerie A. Antcliffe	433	
Alliance	Judith T. Bramley	318	16.4
Alliance	James R.T. Woolgar	298	
Turnout		3,710	39.0
Labour hold			
Labour hold			

=== Glyndon ===
Glyndon (2)
Party	Candidate	Votes	%
Labour	Glyn Williams*	1,037	51.0
Labour	Steven J. Morgan	978	
Alliance	David C. Hadden	794	39.1
Alliance	Hilary E. Newton	786	
Conservative	Jean M. Cooper	201	9.9
Conservative	Joyce Bowe	180	
Turnout		3,976	41.3
Labour hold			
Labour hold			

=== Herbert ===
Herbert (2)
Party	Candidate	Votes	%
Labour	Duncan Maxton	1,012	44.1
Labour	Kantabai M. Patel	894	
Conservative	June O. Gough	618	26.9
Conservative	Barbara A. Cox	596	
Alliance	Edward Ottery	479	20.9
Alliance	Roderick M. Wright	434	
Residents	Julius T.B.D. Evaristo	188	8.2
Turnout		4,221	42.9
Labour hold			
Labour hold			

=== Hornfair ===
Hornfair (2)
Party	Candidate	Votes	%
Labour	James J. Gillman*	1,535	62.6
Labour	John E. Austin-Walker*	1,518	
Conservative	Ernest Ashworth	529	21.6
Conservative	Gregory M. Januszko	479	
Alliance	Anthony C.H. Durham	388	15.8
Alliance	John B. O'Keefe	376	
Turnout		4,825	49.5
Labour hold			
Labour hold			

=== Kidbrooke ===
Kidbrooke (2)
Party	Candidate	Votes	%
Labour	James P.B. Coughlan	1,047	39.0
Labour	Michael W. Rees	1,024	
Conservative	Geoffrey E. Brighty*	985	36.7
Conservative	Timothy M. Hegarty	910	
Alliance	Timothy G. Ford	509	19.0
Alliance	Valerie J. Symes	459	
Independent	Ronald S. Mallone	117	4.4
Communist	Patricia Clinton	24	0.9
Turnout		5,075	53.5
Labour hold			
Labour gain from Conservative			

=== Lakedale ===
Lakedale (2)
Party	Candidate	Votes	%
Labour	Richard Norris	1,122	56.1
Labour	Stephen M. Smith	1,003	
Alliance	Mohibullah Khan	532	26.6
Alliance	Barry Cuerva	443	
Conservative	Brian Smith	346	17.3
Conservative	Michael G. Tarrant	312	
Turnout		3,758	40.9
Labour hold			
Labour hold			

=== Middle Park ===
Middle Park (2)
Party	Candidate	Votes	%
Labour	Catherine B. Jeffrey	1,545	63.7
Labour	John O. Schlackman*	1,519	
Conservative	Anthony J. Mitchell	522	21.5
Conservative	Sheila J. Stirling	483	
Alliance	Peter J. Churchill	357	14.7
Alliance	Rupert S. Weedon	279	
Turnout		4,705	45.7
Labour hold			
Labour hold			

=== New Eltham ===
New Eltham (2)
Party	Candidate	Votes	%
Conservative	Dorothy O. Mepsted	1,595	53.7
Conservative	Dermot D. Poston*	1,595	
Labour	Bertram H. Enston	784	26.4
Labour	Jane H. Mann	763	
Alliance	Sally E. Duran	590	19.9
Alliance	Jennifer J. Viles	573	
Turnout		5,900	54.3
Conservative hold			
Conservative hold			

=== Nightingale ===
Nightingale (1)
Party	Candidate	Votes	%
Labour	Peter M. Challis	821	74.2
Alliance	Ethel M. Farrell	151	13.7
Conservative	Margaret V. Gardner	134	12.1
Turnout		1,106	42.7
Labour hold			

=== Palace ===
Palace (1)
Party	Candidate	Votes	%
Conservative	Peter J.H. King*	756	55.9
Labour	Sean C. Hall	375	27.7
Alliance	Jack B. Taylor	222	16.4
Turnout		1,353	50.9
Conservative hold			

=== Plumstead Common ===
Plumstead Common (1)
Party	Candidate	Votes	%
Labour	Piara S. Rahi	715	48.4
Alliance	Nicholas J. Gregory	472	32.0
Conservative	Elsie R. Frost	212	14.4
Independent	Rajwant S. Sidhu	77	5.2
Turnout		1,476	50.5
Labour hold			

=== Rectory Field ===
Rectory Field (2)
Party	Candidate	Votes	%
Labour	Norman R. Adams*	1,136	56.5
Labour	Victor J.P. Farlie	1,072	
Conservative	Keith G. Brine	466	23.2
Conservative	Tamara I. Martinez	424	
Alliance	John H. Stride	407	20.3
Alliance	Clive M. Buckman	381	
Turnout		3,886	43.5
Labour hold			
Labour hold			

=== St Alfege ===
St Alfege (2)
Party	Candidate	Votes	%
Labour	Doreen J. Bigwood*	1,152	47.6
Labour	David W. Clark	1,018	
Conservative	Douglas R. Easson	704	29.1
Conservative	Pamela R.W. Godwyn	683	
Alliance	Denise C. Abbott	563	23.3
Alliance	Penelope D. Matheson	551	
Turnout		4,671	49.5
Labour hold			
Labour hold			

=== St Mary's ===
St Mary's (2)
Party	Candidate	Votes	%
Labour	Brian R. O'Sullivan*	1,062	60.9
Labour	Christine M. Williams	990	
Alliance	David J. Hall	476	27.3
Alliance	James F. Steele	459	
Conservative	Patience J. Salter	205	11.8
Conservative	Valerie A. Blackborow	194	
Turnout		3,386	38.4
Labour hold			
Labour hold			

=== St Nicholas ===
St Nicholas (2)
Party	Candidate	Votes	%
Labour	Annette F. Barratt	1,154	52.3
Labour	William F. Murphy	1,095	
Alliance	Andrew G.T. Bailey	655	29.7
Alliance	Charles R. Dobson	638	
Conservative	Joan R. Ellis	397	18.0
Conservative	Joan I. Harvey-Bailey	367	
Turnout		4,306	42.2
Labour hold			
Labour hold			

=== Sherard ===
Sherard (2)
Party	Candidate	Votes	%
Labour	Mervyn A. Jeffrey*	1,871	68.9
Labour	Quentin Marsh	1,696	
Conservative	Phyllis Crozier	519	19.1
Conservative	Frank C.J. Smith	483	
Alliance	Myrtle E. Bibby	326	12.0
Alliance	Anthony Dedman	315	
Turnout		5,210	48.9
Labour hold			
Labour hold			

=== Shrewsbury ===
Shrewsbury (1)
Party	Candidate	Votes	%
Conservative	Lewis C. Sergeant	564	36.8
Alliance	Geoffrey R. Clark	526	34.3
Labour	Linda A. Dennison	443	28.9
Turnout		1,533	58.1
Conservative hold			

=== Slade ===
Slade (2)
Party	Candidate	Votes	%
Alliance	David J. Woodhead*	1,172	42.5
Alliance	Colin F. Smith	1,166	
Labour	Henry Pike	1,024	37.1
Labour	Terence R. Quinn	1,001	
Conservative	Kenneth H. Bailey	562	20.4
Conservative	Stanley C. Fieldgate	532	
Turnout		5,457	53.9
Alliance hold			
Alliance hold			

=== Sutcliffe ===
Sutcliffe (1)
Party	Candidate	Votes	%
Conservative	Dingle Clark*	700	43.2
Alliance	Brian J. Woodcraft	540	33.4
Labour	Liam Heary	379	23.4
Turnout		1,619	59.6
Conservative hold			

=== Tarn ===
Tarn (1)
Party	Candidate	Votes	%
Conservative	Derek M. Richards*	680	55.9
Labour	Roy E. George	342	28.1
Alliance	Robert W. Tyrrell	195	16.0
Turnout		1,217	46.0
Conservative hold			

=== Thamesmead Moorings ===
Thameshead Moorings (2)
Party	Candidate	Votes	%
Alliance	Donald J. Austen	857	46.1
Labour	Edward H. Claridge*	837	45.0
Alliance	David J. Spurling	824	
Labour	Claude D. Ramsay	772	
Conservative	Derick A. Holman	165	8.9
Conservative	Margaret J. Holman	142	
Turnout		3,597	39.7
Alliance gain from Labour			
Labour hold			

=== Trafalgar ===
Trafalgar (2)
Party	Candidate	Votes	%
Labour	Alexandra J. Birtles	1,369	57.7
Labour	Elizabeth J. Farmer	1,350	
Alliance	David P. Nolan	587	24.7
Alliance	Anthony J.W. Renouf	531	
Conservative	John C. Bassett	416	17.5
Conservative	Patricia M. Faid	373	
Turnout		4,626	46.4
Labour hold			
Labour hold			

=== Vanbrugh ===
Vanbrugh (2)
Party	Candidate	Votes	%
Labour	Trevor W. Allman	960	38.5
Labour	Christopher Fay	932	
Conservative	Beryl Blackaby*	814	32.6
Conservative	Jeremy B. Wise*	774	
Alliance	Lesley P.M. Gifford	720	28.9
Alliance	Richard C. Hewson	702	
Turnout		4,902	56.8
Labour gain from Conservative			
Labour gain from Conservative			

=== Well Hall ===
Well Hall (2)
Party	Candidate	Votes	%
Conservative	Philip W. Dean	1,202	41.1
Labour	Clive S. Efford	1,174	40.1
Conservative	Eileen R. Sharp	1,149	
Labour	Babubhai Master	1,058	
Alliance	David R. Newson	550	18.8
Alliance	Geoffrey L. Bond	526	
Turnout		5,659	56.8
Conservative hold			
Labour gain from Conservative			

=== West ===
West (2)
Party	Candidate	Votes	%
Labour	William F. Strong*	1,267	65.6
Labour	Ephron B.T. Williams*	1,187	
Conservative	Marilla Fletcher	334	17.3
Alliance	Mark A. Holliday	329	17.0
Conservative	Roger Gough	328	
Alliance	Paula E. Mitchell	307	
Turnout		3,752	40.1
Labour hold			
Labour hold			

=== Woolwich Common ===
Woolwich Common (2)
Party	Candidate	Votes	%
Labour	Gurdip S. Dhillon	949	56.3
Labour	Nicholas Smith	875	
Alliance	Joan Simmonds	424	25.1
Alliance	Robert B. Millard	412	
Conservative	Derek K. Britto	313	18.6
Conservative	Seraphim W.H.H. Newman-Norton	299	
Turnout		3,272	38.6
Labour hold			
Labour hold			
