= 2014 Greenwich London Borough Council election =

2014 local election in England

Map of the results of the 2014 Greenwich council election. Conservatives in blue and Labour in red.

The 2014 Greenwich Council election took place on 22 May 2014 to elect members of Greenwich London Borough Council in England. This was on the same day as other local elections.

At the 2014 elections, Labour won 43 seats (+3) and the Conservatives won 8 (-3). An Eltham North by-election on 10 November 2016 saw the Conservatives gain a seat from Labour with an 11% swing in their favour. This meant the opposition on the council increased to 9 seats.

Turnout across the borough was 37.25%.

== Ward Results ==
=== Abbey Wood ===
Abbey Wood
Party	Candidate	Votes	%	±%
Labour	Denise Hyland	2,058	57.7	+8.4
Labour	Clive Mardner	2,031	56.9	+5.4
Labour	Steve Offord	1,810	50.7	+3.8
UKIP	Michael Glenister	978	27.4	N/A
Green	Gerard Briody	486	13.6	+5.8
Conservative	Graham Brinkhurst	436	12.2	−7.6
Conservative	Barbara Couper	390	10.9	−8.3
Conservative	Frank Salmon	311	8.7	−7.0
Liberal Democrats	Tom Headon	246	6.9	−11.3
Liberal Democrats	Mark Bryceland	241	6.8	−11.3
Liberal Democrats	Samson Iriajen	169	4.7	−10.3
Turnout		3,569	33.8	
Labour hold		Swing		
Labour hold		Swing		
Labour hold		Swing		

=== Blackheath Westcombe ===
Blackheath Westcombe
Party	Candidate	Votes	%	±%
Labour	Cherry Parker	2,185	47.6	+10.7
Labour	Paul Morrissey	2,028	44.2	+11.5
Conservative	Geoff Brighty	1,797	39.2	+3.5
Labour	Damien Welfare	1,725	37.6	+9.4
Conservative	Thomas Turrell	1,518	33.1	±0.0
Conservative	Laela Pakpour Tabrizi	1,459	31.8	−1.0
Green	Trevor Allman	1,098	23.9	+8.5
Liberal Democrats	Michael O'Keefe	477	10.4	−17.1
Liberal Democrats	Lee Coppack	458	10.0	−11.4
Turnout		4,588	47.7	
Labour hold		Swing		
Labour gain from Conservative		Swing		
Conservative hold		Swing		

=== Charlton ===
Charlton
Party	Candidate	Votes	%	±%
Labour	Allan MacCarthy	2,193	57.9	+9.7
Labour	Miranda Williams	2,112	55.8	+3.9
Labour	Gary Parker	1,890	49.9	+7.0
Green	Jack Wheeler	798	21.1	+7.5
UKIP	Gary Port	664	17.5	N/A
Conservative	Della Averley	589	15.6	−8.3
Conservative	James Worron	497	13.1	−6.9
Conservative	Miki Rodrigues-Hale	441	11.6	−8.1
Liberal Democrats	Paul Chapman	395	10.4	−8.7
Liberal Democrats	Ian Gerrard	318	8.4	−10.2
Liberal Democrats	Richard Mbogga	195	5.1	−11.6
Turnout		3,787	37.8	
Labour hold		Swing		
Labour hold		Swing		
Labour hold		Swing		

=== Coldharbour and New Eltham ===
Coldharbour and New Eltham
Party	Candidate	Votes	%	±%
Conservative	John Hills	1,739	44.2	+1.2
Conservative	Mandy Brinkhurst	1,636	41.6	−3.9
Conservative	Matt Hartley	1,501	38.1	−2.8
UKIP	Peter Whittle	1,137	28.9	N/A
Labour	Robert Carr	1,112	28.3	−7.2
Labour	Sandra Bauer	1,108	28.2	−1.4
Labour	John Slater	1,016	25.8	−1.9
BNP	Clifford Adams	401	10.2	−2.8
Green	David Sharman	398	10.1	+0.5
Liberal Democrats	Emma Lewis	180	4.6	−11.0
Liberal Democrats	Paul Gentry	158	4.0	−11.9
Liberal Democrats	Michael Lewis	125	3.2	N/A
Turnout		3,935	40.5	
Conservative hold		Swing		
Conservative hold		Swing		
Conservative hold		Swing		

=== Eltham North ===
Eltham North
Party	Candidate	Votes	%	±%
Conservative	Spencer Drury	1,975	40.4	−2.9
Labour	Linda Bird	1,946	39.8	+6.1
Labour	Wynn Davies	1,942	39.7	+6.8
Conservative	Nigel Fletcher	1,823	37.3	−4.4
Labour	Simon Peirce	1,556	31.8	−1.0
Conservative	Adam Thomas	1,519	31.1	−7.9
UKIP	Paul Butler	1,221	25.0	N/A
Green	Rob Stead	591	12.1	+3.3
BNP	Roberta Woods	307	6.3	−3.3
Liberal Democrats	Yvonne Nicholls	207	4.2	−11.6
Liberal Democrats	Patrick Early	205	4.2	−10.9
Turnout		4,892	50.3	
Conservative hold		Swing		
Labour gain from Conservative		Swing		
Labour gain from Conservative		Swing		

=== Eltham South ===
Eltham South
Party	Candidate	Votes	%	±%
Conservative	Matt Clare	1,394	38.4	−5.3
Conservative	Mark Elliott	1,298	35.8	−9.2
Conservative	Nuala Geary	1,183	32.6	−3.1
Labour	Simon Christie	1,115	30.8	+3.2
UKIP	John Evans	1,069	29.5	N/A
Labour	John Galloway	1,016	28.0	+1.6
Labour	Jagir Kaur Sekhon	839	23.1	−1.2
Independent	Eileen Glover	440	12.1	−33.4
Green	David Turner	402	11.1	+4.5
BNP	Thelma Peete	248	6.8	−2.2
Liberal Democrats	Michael Chuter	208	5.7	−19.1
Liberal Democrats	Eileen Cox	206	5.7	−12.4
Liberal Democrats	Mark Pattenden	181	5.0	−19.8
Turnout		3,626	41.4	
Conservative hold		Swing		
Conservative hold		Swing		
Conservative hold		Swing		

=== Eltham West ===
Eltham West
Party	Candidate	Votes	%	±%
Labour	Mick Hayes	1,479	52.6	+3.2
Labour	Bill Freeman	1,453	51.7	+2.5
Labour	Ray Walker	1,283	45.6	+0.1
UKIP	Ryan Acty	856	30.4	N/A
Conservative	Charles Davis	452	16.1	−9.6
Conservative	John Nichols	451	16.0	−8.7
Green	Mark Stevenson	377	13.4	+6.7
Conservative	James Shipp	353	12.5	−7.5
BNP	Paul Ramsey	314	11.2	−2.2
Liberal Democrats	Harry Potter	158	5.6	−9.0
Liberal Democrats	Lester Shubert	145	5.2	−5.9
Turnout		2,813	34.9	
Labour hold		Swing		
Labour hold		Swing		
Labour hold		Swing		

=== Glyndon ===
Glyndon
Party	Candidate	Votes	%	±%
Labour	Donald Austen	2,212	63.8	+6.5
Labour	Peter Brooks	2,064	59.5	+6.3
Labour	Radha Rabadia	1,995	57.5	+3.3
Green	Janine Wilson	568	16.4	+6.2
Conservative	Gillian Lee	494	14.2	−3.4
Conservative	Bhaval Patel	440	12.7	−3.0
Conservative	Sheila Stirling	416	12.0	−4.3
TUSC	Lynne Chamberlain	359	10.4	+2.6
TUSC	Sian Stringer	285	8.2	N/A
Liberal Democrats	Jo Heap	238	6.9	−10.9
TUSC	Sara Kasab	212	6.1	N/A
Liberal Democrats	Edward Ottery	150	4.3	−12.5
Liberal Democrats	Eva Nabukeera-Mbogga	127	3.7	−11.0
Turnout		3,468	31.8	
Labour hold		Swing		
Labour hold		Swing		
Labour hold		Swing		

=== Greenwich West ===
Greenwich West
Party	Candidate	Votes	%	±%
Labour	Maureen O'Mara	2,665	59.4	+17.7
Labour	Matthew Pennycook	2,448	54.6	+18.3
Labour	Aidan Smith	2,159	48.1	+8.7
Green	Robin Stott	1,108	24.7	+17.0
Conservative	Patricia Gillard	977	21.8	−0.4
Conservative	Andrew Corstorphine	905	20.2	−1.6
Conservative	Louis McLean-Wait	824	18.4	−2.9
Liberal Democrats	Suzanne Miller	557	12.4	−15.9
Liberal Democrats	Andrew Smith	497	11.1	−17.0
Liberal Democrats	Mark Rotchell	438	9.8	−15.0
Turnout		4,485	38.0	
Labour hold		Swing		
Labour hold		Swing		
Labour hold		Swing		

=== Kidbrooke with Hornfair ===
Kidbrooke with Hornfair
Party	Candidate	Votes	%	±%
Labour	Norman Adams	1,770	50.7	+5.1
Labour	Christine Grice	1,686	48.3	+6.3
Labour	David Stanley	1,495	42.8	+1.4
UKIP	Barbara Ray	949	27.2	N/A
Conservative	Toni Hale	773	22.1	−11.1
Conservative	Gold Emmanuel	721	20.7	−7.5
Green	Arthur Hayles	590	16.9	+8.6
Conservative	Semo Serroukh	541	15.5	−9.6
Liberal Democrats	Frances Hunter	301	8.6	−8.1
Turnout		3,491	35.0	
Labour hold		Swing		
Labour hold		Swing		
Labour hold		Swing		

=== Middle Park and Sutcliffe ===
Middle Park and Sutcliffe
Party	Candidate	Votes	%	±%
Labour	Christine May	1,709	44.1	+5.9
Labour	Mark James	1,658	42.8	+5.4
Labour	Clare Morris	1,624	41.9	+5.0
Conservative	Elizabeth Drury	1,026	26.5	+0.4
UKIP	Raymond Adams	913	23.6	+5.1
Conservative	David Goss	886	22.9	−1.5
Conservative	Ben Mawji	781	20.2	−0.3
Green	Roger Brand	568	14.7	+7.9
Liberal Democrats	Mary Green	366	9.5	−15.5
Liberal Democrats	David Beaumont	343	8.9	−16.6
BNP	Nick Scanlon	313	8.1	−0.2
Liberal Democrats	Paul Webbewood	273	7.1	−18.7
Turnout		3,872	40.1	
Labour hold		Swing		
Labour hold		Swing		
Labour hold		Swing		

=== Peninsula ===
Peninsula
Party	Candidate	Votes	%	±%
Labour	Stephen Brain	1,926	48.7	+5.9
Labour	Denise Scott-McDonald	1,771	44.8	+8.1
Labour	Chris Lloyd	1,614	40.8	+5.2
Green	Jan King	789	20.0	+2.2
Green	Philip Connolly	757	19.1	+4.1
Conservative	Harry Methley	749	18.9	−4.9
Conservative	Maya Mann	730	18.5	−4.2
Conservative	Piers Tweddell	665	16.8	−5.7
Green	Tim Wilson	609	15.4	+2.2
UKIP	Gillian Radcliffe	540	13.7	N/A
Liberal Democrats	Christopher Brand	296	7.5	−12.7
Liberal Democrats	Anthony Durham	219	5.5	−14.0
Liberal Democrats	George McFarlane	205	5.2	−12.4
Independent	Terry Wheeler	177	4.5	N/A
Majority				
Turnout		3,954	38.0	
Labour hold		Swing		
Labour hold		Swing		
Labour hold		Swing		

=== Plumstead ===
Plumstead
Party	Candidate	Votes	%	±%
Labour	Angela Cornforth	2,441	67.7	+12.6
Labour	Matthew Morrow	2,033	56.4	+5.1
Labour	Rajinder Sehmar	1,850	51.3	+1.4
UKIP	Ronie Johnson	924	25.6	N/A
Green	Jo Lawbuary	522	14.5	+6.6
Conservative	Sheila Frost	421	11.7	−9.0
Conservative	Martin Riley	408	11.3	−8.6
Conservative	Gemma Robinson	371	10.3	−5.8
Liberal Democrats	Sylvia Derrick-Reeve	336	9.3	−8.5
Turnout		3,606	35.1	
Labour hold		Swing		
Labour hold		Swing		
Labour hold		Swing		

=== Shooters Hill ===
Shooters Hill
Party	Candidate	Votes	%	±%
Labour	Sarah Merrill	2,027	51.4	+3.4
Labour	Chris Kirby	1,940	49.2	+3.9
Labour	Danny Thorpe	1,894	48.0	+4.7
UKIP	Les Price	933	23.6	N/A
Conservative	Mo Burgess	820	20.8	−8.4
Green	Michael Westcombe	716	18.1	+7.9
Conservative	Pat Greenwell	684	17.3	−10.3
Conservative	Amit Tiwari	482	12.2	−13.1
Liberal Democrats	Stewart Christie	390	9.9	−8.9
Liberal Democrats	Anthony Austin	269	6.8	−8.9
Liberal Democrats	Bonnie Soanes	249	6.3	−8.3
Turnout		3,947	41.0	
Labour hold		Swing		
Labour hold		Swing		
Labour hold		Swing		

=== Thamesmead Moorings ===
Thamesmead Moorings
Party	Candidate	Votes	%	±%
Labour	Olu Babatola	2,201	63.8	+1.9
Labour	Averil Lekau	1,991	57.7	+3.2
Labour	Sizwe James	1,931	56.0	+2.2
Conservative	David Brinson	555	16.1	−0.9
Independent	Femi Solola	546	15.8	N/A
Conservative	Thomas Ralph	475	13.8	−1.7
Green	Susan Haroutunian	427	12.4	+7.4
Independent	Freda McEwen	348	10.1	N/A
Liberal Democrats	Paul West	341	9.9	−5.7
Conservative	Alka Stannard	333	9.6	−4.0
Turnout		3,451	29.6	
Labour hold		Swing		
Labour hold		Swing		
Labour hold		Swing		

=== Woolwich Common ===
Woolwich Common
Party	Candidate	Votes	%	±%
Labour	David Gardner	2,289	69.9	+6.7
Labour	Harry Singh	2,208	67.4	+12.6
Labour	Ambreen Hisbani	2,048	62.6	+6.4
Green	Purnendu Roy	469	14.3	+5.2
UKIP	David Warwicker	467	14.3	N/A
Conservative	Patricia Hills	350	10.7	−5.3
Conservative	Jennifer Jones	336	10.3	−5.4
Conservative	Janet Wainwright	269	8.2	−7.4
Liberal Democrats	Peter Gwizdala	238	7.3	−11.8
Turnout		3,274	31.8	
Labour hold		Swing		
Labour hold		Swing		
Labour hold		Swing		

=== Woolwich Riverside ===
Woolwich Riverside
Party	Candidate	Votes	%	±%
Labour	Barbara Barwick	2,426	62.3	+5.1
Labour	Jackie Smith	2,215	56.9	+7.0
Labour	John Fahy	2,162	55.5	+2.0
Green	Elizabeth Angas	652	16.7	+5.5
UKIP	John Gill	621	15.9	N/A
Conservative	Michael Davidson	612	15.7	−6.0
Conservative	David Couper	514	13.2	−6.6
Conservative	Abdoulaye Diallo	419	10.8	−5.3
Liberal Democrats	Rachael Clarke	307	7.9	−9.9
Liberal Democrats	Sally Hooker	263	6.8	−10.2
Independent	Hamsa Yusuf	203	5.2	N/A
Liberal Democrats	Matthew Horrox	177	4.5	−9.1
Turnout		3,896	31.4	
Labour hold		Swing		
Labour hold		Swing		
Labour hold		Swing		

== 2014–2018 by-elections ==
Greenwich West by-election, 7 May 2015
Party	Candidate	Votes	%	±%
Labour	Mehboob Khan	3,430	39.3	▼12.0
Conservative	Thomas Turrell	2,466	28.2	▲10.4
Green	Robin Scott	1,452	16.6	▼4.7
Liberal Democrats	Sonia Dunlop	756	8.6	▼1.3
UKIP	Paul Butler	422	4.8	▲4.8
BNP	Christina Charles	138	1.6	▲1.6
TUSC	Sara Kasab	80	0.9	▲0.9
Turnout		3,717	64.1	
Labour hold		Swing		

The by-election was called following the resignation of Cllr Matthew Pennycook, who was elected as the Member of Parliament for the Greenwich and Woolwich constituency the same night.

Glyndon by-election, 5 May 2016
Party	Candidate	Votes	%	±%
Labour	Tonia Ashikodi	2,583	57.1	0.0
Conservative	Matt Browne	561	12.4	▲0.4
Green	Robin Scott	402	8.9	▼5.8
UKIP	Rita Dinsmore-Hamilton	380	8.4	▲8.4
Liberal Democrats	Stewart Christie	376	8.3	▲2.2
Independent	Ebru Ogun	157	3.5	▲3.5
All People's Party	Abiola Olaore	64	1.4	▲1.4
Majority		2,022	44.7	
Turnout			41.5	
Labour hold		Swing		

The by-election was called following the resignation of Councillor Radha Rabadia of the Labour Party.

Eltham North by-election, 10 November 2016
Party	Candidate	Votes	%	±%
Conservative	Charlie Davis	1,335	42.2	▲10.6
Labour	Simon Peirce	1,297	40.4	▼9.3
Liberal Democrats	Sam Macaulay	279	8.8	▲5.5
UKIP	Barbara Ray	160	5.1	▼14.5
Green	Matt Browne	110	3.5	▼6.0
Majority		38	1.8	
Turnout		3,186	31.33	
Conservative gain from Labour		Swing		

The by-election was called following the resignation of Councillor Wynn Davies of the Labour Party.
