= Abbey Wood (ward) =

Electoral ward in Greenwich, England

- Electoral ward for the Greenwich London Borough Council
- Abbey Wood ward boundaries since 2022
- Borough: Greenwich
- County: Greater London
- Population: 17,689 (2021) (Note: 2021 Census data reported for 2022 ward boundaries)
- Electorate: 11,135 (2022)
- Major settlements: Abbey Wood
- Area: 2.737 square kilometres (1.057 sq mi)

Current electoral ward
- Created: 1965
- Number of members: 1965–1978: 3; 1978–2002: 2; 2002–present: 3
- Councillors: Peter Baker; Ann-Marie Cousins; Denise Hyland
- GSS code: E05014072 (2022–present)

Abbey Wood is an electoral ward in the Royal Borough of Greenwich. The ward was first used in the 1964 elections. It returns councillors to Greenwich London Borough Council.

== List of councillors ==
Term	Councillor	Party
2010–present	Denise Hyland	Labour
2018–present	Ann-Marie Cousins (Note: Ann-Marie Cousins changed parties in 2025.)	Labour
2018–present	Ann-Marie Cousins	Independent
2022–present	Peter Baker	Labour

== Greenwich council elections since 2022 ==
There was a revision of ward boundaries in Greenwich in 2022.

=== 2022 election ===
The election took place on 5 May 2022.

2022 Greenwich London Borough Council election: Abbey Wood (3)
Party	Candidate	Votes	%	±%
Labour	Peter Baker	1,980	66.8	
Labour	Ann-Marie Cousins	1,964	66.2	
Labour	Denise Hyland	1,929	65.1	
Conservative	David Brinson	569	19.2	
Green	James Brandon	526	17.7	
Conservative	Brenda Lobo	506	17.1	
Conservative	Brian Weller	499	16.8	
Green	Roberto Mirabella	374	12.6	
Green	Aruhan Galieva	338	11.4	
Liberal Democrats	Anthony Durham	211	7.1	
Turnout			28.0	
Labour win (new boundaries)				
Labour win (new boundaries)				
Labour win (new boundaries)				

== 2002–2022 Greenwich council elections ==
Abbey Wood ward boundaries from 2002 to 2022

There was a revision of ward boundaries in Greenwich in 2002.

=== 2018 election ===
The election took place on 3 May 2018.

2018 Greenwich London Borough Council election: Abbey Wood (3)
Party	Candidate	Votes	%	±%
Labour Co-op	Ann-Marie Cousins	2,213	65.4	
Labour Co-op	Denise Hyland	1,985	58.6	
Labour Co-op	Clive Mardner	1,980	58.5	
Independent	Bruce Jamieson	507	15.0	
Independent	Craig Jenkins	476	14.1	
Independent	Ronie Johnson	403	11.9	
Conservative	David Burrows	399	11.8	
Conservative	Roland Hogg	313	9.2	
Conservative	Janet Martin	304	9.0	
Liberal Democrats	Gareth Clayfield	231	6.8	
Green	Arthur Hayles	227	6.7	
Liberal Democrats	Tom Headon	192	5.7	
Turnout			31.44	
Labour hold		Swing		
Labour hold		Swing		
Labour hold		Swing		

=== 2014 election ===
The election took place on 22 May 2014.

=== 2010 election ===
The election on 6 May 2010 took place on the same day as the United Kingdom general election.

2010 Greenwich London Borough Council election: Abbey Wood (3)
Party	Candidate	Votes	%	±%
Labour	Clive Mardner	3,061	45.1	
Labour	Denise Hyland	2,929		
Labour	Steve Offord	2,785		
Conservative	Nick Bailey	1,177	17.3	
Conservative	Keima Allen	1,138		
Liberal Democrats	Bonnie Soanes	1,083	16.0	
Liberal Democrats	Ismail Danesi	1,075		
Conservative	Petrina Sargent	930		
Liberal Democrats	Samson Iriajen	891		
BNP	David Edmonds	710	10.5	
Green	Gerard Briody	465	6.9	
CPA	Elizabeth Ejinkonye	290	4.3	
CPA	Stanley Gain	154		
CPA	Peter Vickers	127		
Turnout			59.1	
Labour hold		Swing		
Labour hold		Swing		
Labour hold		Swing		

=== 2006 election ===
The election took place on 4 May 2006.

2006 Greenwich London Borough Council election: Abbey Wood (3)
Party	Candidate	Votes	%	±%
Labour	Clive Mardner	1,292	40.4	
Labour	Stephen Offord	1,191		
Labour	Jagir Sekhon	1,121		
Liberal Democrats	Thomas Headon	764	23.9	
Liberal Democrats	Bonnie Soanes	696		
Independent	June Milner	624	19.5	
Liberal Democrats	Eder Nteyoho	622		
Independent	Ismail Danesi	612		
Independent	Anthony Ward	593		
Conservative	Emily Head	519	16.2	
Conservative	Jennifer Jones	513		
Conservative	Malcolm Reid	486		
Turnout			32.3	
Labour hold		Swing		
Labour hold		Swing		
Labour hold		Swing		

=== 2002 election ===
The election took place on 2 May 2002.
