= 2010 Greenwich London Borough Council election =

London UK council election results

2010 Greenwich Borough Council election
- 6 May 2010

All 51 seats to Greenwich London Borough Council 26 seats needed for a majority
	First party	Second party
Party	Labour	Conservative
Last election	36 seats, 38.1%	13 seats, 27.4%
Seats won	40	11
Seat change	▲4	▼2
Popular vote	47,949	28,710
Percentage	41.1%	24.6%
Swing	▲3.0%	▼2.8%
- Map of the results of the 2010 Greenwich council election. Conservatives in blue and Labour in red.
Council control before election
Labour
Council control after election
Labour

Elections for Greenwich Council in London were held on 6 May 2010. The 2010 United Kingdom general election and other local elections took place on the same day.

In London council elections, the entire council is elected every four years, unlike some local elections in which one councillor is elected every year in three of the four years.

== Results ==
Greenwich Council election result 2010
Party	Seats	Gains	Losses	Net gain/loss	Seats %	Votes %	Votes	+/−
Labour	40	4	0	▲4	78.4	41.1	47,949	▲3.0
Conservative	11	0	2	▼2	21.6	24.6	28,710	▼2.8
Liberal Democrats	0	0	2	▼2	0.0	17.5	20,391	▼1.0
Green	0	0	0	Steady	0.0	8.6	10,032	▲0.6
BNP	0	0	0	Steady	0.0	5.9	6,843	▲4.3
Independent	0	0	0	Steady	0.0	1.0	1,129	▼1.4
CPA	0	0	0	Steady	0.0	0.8	946	0.0
UKIP	0	0	0	Steady	0.0	0.4	518	▼1.9
English Democrat	0	0	0	Steady	0.0	0.2	188	New

== Ward results ==
=== Abbey Wood ===
Abbey Wood (3)
Party	Candidate	Votes	%	±%
Labour	Clive Mardner	3,061	51.5	
Labour	Denise Hyland	2,929	49.3	
Labour	Steve Offord	2,785	46.9	
Conservative	Nick Bailey	1,177	19.8	
Conservative	Keima Allen	1,138	19.2	
Liberal Democrats	Bonnie Soanes	1,083	18.2	
Liberal Democrats	Ismail Danesi	1,075	18.1	
Conservative	Petrina Sargent	930	15.7	
Liberal Democrats	Samson Iriajen	891	15.0	
BNP	David Edmonds	710	12.0	
Green	Gerard Briody	465	7.8	
CPA	Elizabeth Ejinkonye	290	4.9	
CPA	Stanley Gain	154	2.6	
CPA	Peter Vickers	127	2.1	
Turnout		5,938	59.1	
Labour hold		Swing		
Labour hold		Swing		
Labour hold		Swing		

=== Blackheath Westcombe ===
Blackheath Westcombe (3)
Party	Candidate	Votes	%	±%
Labour	Alex Grant	2,477	36.9	
Conservative	Geoff Brighty	2,399	35.7	
Conservative	Alex Wilson	2,219	33.1	
Conservative	Liz Drury	2,202	32.8	
Labour	David Gardner	2,197	32.7	
Labour	Pat Boadu-Darko	1,892	28.2	
Liberal Democrats	Alexa Hills	1,847	27.5	
Liberal Democrats	Michael Smart	1,439	21.4	
Liberal Democrats	Christopher Smith	1,364	20.3	
Green	Trevor Allman	1,036	15.4	
English Democrat	Topo Wresniwiro	188	2.8	
Turnout		6,714	72.4	
Labour hold		Swing		
Conservative hold		Swing		
Conservative hold		Swing		

=== Charlton ===
Charlton (3)
Party	Candidate	Votes	%	±%
Labour	Janet Gillman	3,137	51.9	
Labour	Allan MacCarthy	2,911	48.2	
Labour	Gary Parker	2,594	42.9	
Conservative	James Garry	1,446	23.9	
Conservative	Wait McLean	1,211	20.0	
Conservative	Richard Shackleton	1,191	19.7	
Liberal Democrats	Thom Lyons	1,152	19.1	
Liberal Democrats	Katie Sutton	1,121	18.6	
Liberal Democrats	David Scales	1,010	16.7	
Green	Jack Stride	822	13.6	
BNP	Michael Redmond	365	6.0	
Turnout		6,040	62.6	
Labour hold		Swing		
Labour hold		Swing		
Labour hold		Swing		

=== Coldharbour and New Eltham ===
Coldharbour and New Eltham (3)
Party	Candidate	Votes	%	±%
Conservative	Mandy Brinkhurst	2,963	45.5	
Conservative	John Hills	2,796	43.0	
Conservative	Neil Dickinson	2,663	40.9	
Labour	Penelope Daniel	2,310	35.5	
Labour	David Reader	1,925	29.6	
Labour	Michael Stanworth	1,805	27.7	
Liberal Democrats	Anthea Gent	1,033	15.9	
Liberal Democrats	Emma Lewis	1,013	15.6	
BNP	Clifford Adams	843	13.0	
Green	Philip Connolly	611	9.4	
Turnout		6,506	67.3	
Conservative hold		Swing		
Conservative hold		Swing		
Conservative hold		Swing		

=== Eltham North ===
Eltham North (3)
Party	Candidate	Votes	%	±%
Conservative	Spencer Drury	3,078	43.3	
Conservative	Nigel Fletcher	2,968	41.7	
Conservative	Dermot Poston	2,774	39.0	
Labour	Bernie Borland	2,395	33.7	
Labour	Emily Bird	2,338	32.9	
Labour	Janice Marnham	2,330	32.8	
Liberal Democrats	Edward Randall	1,126	15.8	
Liberal Democrats	Helen Blackburn	1,073	15.1	
Liberal Democrats	Elliot Shubert	816	11.5	
BNP	Rowena Davenport	686	9.6	
Green	David Turner	625	8.8	
Turnout		7,113	75.1	
Conservative hold		Swing		
Conservative hold		Swing		
Conservative hold		Swing		

=== Eltham South ===
Eltham South (3)
Party	Candidate	Votes	%	±%
Conservative	Eileen Glover	2,677	45.0	
Conservative	Matthew Clare	2,603	43.7	
Conservative	Adam Thomas	2,128	35.7	
Labour	Lesley Abbott	1,645	27.6	
Labour	James May	1,570	26.4	
Liberal Democrats	Mark Pattenden	1,479	24.8	
Liberal Democrats	Michael Lewis	1,476	24.8	
Labour	John Twidale	1,450	24.3	
Liberal Democrats	Boba Rangelov	1,077	18.1	
BNP	Helen Peart	536	9.0	
Green	Jan King	391	6.6	
Turnout		5,955	63.9	
Conservative hold		Swing		
Conservative hold		Swing		
Conservative hold		Swing		

=== Eltham West ===
Eltham West (3)
Party	Candidate	Votes	%	±%
Labour	Michael Hayes	2,255	49.4	
Labour	William Freeman	2,243	49.2	
Labour	Raymond Walker	2,075	45.5	
Conservative	Ian Bennett	1,172	25.7	
Conservative	Remi Raymore	1,128	24.7	
Conservative	Teichmeister Von	911	20.0	
Liberal Democrats	Eileen Cox	667	14.6	
BNP	Roberta Woods	612	13.4	
BNP	Linda Tredray	528	11.6	
Liberal Democrats	Matthew Huntbach	508	11.1	
Liberal Democrats	Yvonne Nicholls	465	10.2	
Green	Carl Holdway	307	6.7	
Turnout		4,563	59.4	
Labour hold		Swing		
Labour hold		Swing		
Labour hold		Swing		

=== Glyndon ===
Glyndon (3)
Party	Candidate	Votes	%	±%
Labour	Donald Austen	3,386	57.3	
Labour	Radha Rabadia	3,201	54.2	
Labour	Christopher Roberts	3,144	53.2	
Liberal Democrats	Tom Headon	1,054	17.8	
Conservative	Paul Chapman	1,041	17.6	
Liberal Democrats	Suzanne Miller	993	16.8	
Conservative	David Godden	966	16.3	
Conservative	Bhaval Patel	928	15.7	
Liberal Democrats	Andrew Smith	870	14.7	
Green	Andy Hewett	602	10.2	
Independent	Lynne Chamberlain	461	7.8	
Turnout		5,910	55.6	
Labour hold		Swing		
Labour hold		Swing		
Labour hold		Swing		

=== Greenwich West ===
Greenwich West (3)
Party	Candidate	Votes	%	±%
Labour	Maureen O'Mara	2,783	41.7	
Labour	David Grant	2,630	39.4	
Labour	Matthew Pennycook	2,421	36.3	
Liberal Democrats	Lucy Mortimer	1,889	28.3	
Liberal Democrats	Anthony Austin	1,879	28.1	
Liberal Democrats	Ian Gerrard	1,654	24.8	
Conservative	Simon Gallie	1,481	22.2	
Conservative	Ryan Acty	1,459	21.8	
Conservative	Mary Harris	1,423	21.3	
Green	Adrian Ross	625	9.4	
Green	Darren Ball	585	8.8	
Green	Robin Stott	512	7.7	
Turnout		6,678	63.0	
Labour hold		Swing		
Labour hold		Swing		
Labour hold		Swing		

=== Kidbrooke with Hornfair ===
Kidbrooke with Hornfair (3)
Party	Candidate	Votes	%	±%
Labour	Norman Adams	2,709	45.6	
Labour	Jim Gillman	2,491	42.0	
Labour	Hayley Fletcher	2,456	41.4	
Conservative	Graeme Coombes	1,969	33.2	
Conservative	Frank Salmon	1,673	28.2	
Conservative	Semo Serroukh	1,489	25.1	
Liberal Democrats	Lee Coppack	993	16.7	
Liberal Democrats	Denys Robinson	872	14.7	
Liberal Democrats	Barbara Woodcraft	779	13.1	
BNP	John Leech	607	10.2	
Green	Arthur Hayles	491	8.3	
Turnout		5,936	60.4	
Labour gain from Conservative		Swing		
Labour hold		Swing		
Labour gain from Conservative		Swing		

=== Middle Park and Sutcliffe ===
Middle Park and Sutcliffe (3)
Party	Candidate	Votes	%	±%
Labour	Christine May	2,324	38.2	
Labour	Mark James	2,274	37.4	
Labour	Clare Morris	2,247	36.9	
Conservative	David Brinson	1,587	26.1	
Liberal Democrats	Paul Webbewood	1,571	25.8	
Liberal Democrats	Brian Woodcraft	1,552	25.5	
Liberal Democrats	Mary Green	1,521	25.0	
Conservative	Patricia Gillard	1,486	24.4	
Conservative	Arujuna Sivananthan	1,244	20.5	
UKIP	Ray Adams	518	8.5	
BNP	Paul Ramsey	507	8.3	
Green	Robert Elias	416	6.8	
Turnout		6,082	64.5	
Labour gain from Liberal Democrats		Swing		
Labour hold		Swing		
Labour gain from Liberal Democrats		Swing		

=== Peninsula ===
Peninsula (3)
Party	Candidate	Votes	%	±%
Labour	Mary Mills	2,566	42.8	
Labour	Richard Quibell	2,200	36.7	
Labour	Miranda Williams	2,136	35.6	
Conservative	Charlie Easton	1,426	23.8	
Conservative	Malcolm Reid	1,362	22.7	
Conservative	Toks Bailey	1,349	22.5	
Liberal Democrats	Philip Butt	1,210	20.2	
Liberal Democrats	Alex Cunliffe	1,167	19.5	
Green	Darryl Chamberlain	1,066	17.8	
Liberal Democrats	Julia Tybura	1,055	17.6	
Green	Dave Sharman	900	15.0	
Green	Marek Powley	791	13.2	
Turnout		5,993	63.5	
Labour hold		Swing		
Labour hold		Swing		
Labour hold		Swing		

=== Plumstead ===
Plumstead (3)
Party	Candidate	Votes	%	±%
Labour	Angela Cornforth	3,254	55.1	
Labour	Matthew Morrow	3,028	51.3	
Labour	Sajid Jawaid	2,945	49.9	
Conservative	Matthew Martin	1,225	20.7	
Conservative	Graham Brinkhurst	1,174	19.9	
Liberal Democrats	Mark Bryceland	1,052	17.8	
Conservative	Mascrel De	953	16.1	
Liberal Democrats	Narendra Kandel	929	15.7	
Liberal Democrats	Salvador Lloret-Farina	719	12.2	
BNP	Raymond Nelson	514	8.7	
Green	David-James Whitney	465	7.9	
CPA	Theophilus Adesina	191	3.2	
CPA	Kehinde Arusuraire	167	2.8	
CPA	Samuel Anene	122	2.1	
Turnout		5,904	59.7	
Labour hold		Swing		
Labour hold		Swing		
Labour hold		Swing		

=== Shooters Hill ===
Shooters Hill (3)
Party	Candidate	Votes	%	±%
Labour	Barry Taylor	3,093	48.0	
Labour	Jagir Sekhon	2,917	45.3	
Labour	Danny Thorpe	2,788	43.3	
Conservative	Mo Burgess	1,881	29.2	
Conservative	Simon Emmett	1,777	27.6	
Conservative	Richard Chandler	1,628	25.3	
Liberal Democrats	Edward Ottery	1,210	18.8	
Liberal Democrats	Steven Toole	1,009	15.7	
Liberal Democrats	Harry Potter	939	14.6	
Green	Phillip Becker	659	10.2	
BNP	Eddie White	513	8.0	
Turnout		6,441	67.7	
Labour hold		Swing		
Labour hold		Swing		
Labour hold		Swing		

=== Thamesmead Moorings ===
Thamesmead Moorings (3)
Party	Candidate	Votes	%	±%
Labour	Peter Brooks	3,826	61.9	
Labour	Peter Kotz	3,371	54.5	
Labour	Jacqueline Smith	3,326	53.8	
Conservative	Catherine Culbert	1,049	17.0	
Liberal Democrats	Neil Cole	965	15.6	
Conservative	Laura Murphy	959	15.5	
Conservative	Sheila Frost	843	13.6	
BNP	Bernard Edmonds	563	9.1	
Liberal Democrats	Rene Mugenzi	534	8.6	
CPA	Emeka Ejinkonye	465	7.5	
Liberal Democrats	Marie Numuhoza	452	7.3	
Independent	Emmanuel Idowu	340	5.5	
CPA	Stephen Hammond	322	5.2	
CPA	Lean Osahon	320	5.2	
Green	Susan Harotunian	306	5.0	
Turnout		6,180	54.3	
Labour hold		Swing		
Labour hold		Swing		
Labour hold		Swing		

=== Woolwich Common ===
Woolwich Common (3)
Party	Candidate	Votes	%	±%
Labour	Beverley Jones	3,312	63.2	
Labour	Rajwant Sidhu	2,943	56.2	
Labour	Harry Singh	2,872	54.8	
Liberal Democrats	Leonie Barron	999	19.1	
Conservative	Patricia Hills	841	16.0	
Liberal Democrats	Anthony Durham	833	15.9	
Conservative	John Frost	823	15.7	
Conservative	John Nichols	815	15.6	
Liberal Democrats	Richard Mbogga	605	11.5	
Green	Robert Evans	475	9.1	
Independent	Elizabeth Olayokun	328	6.3	
Turnout		5,241	54.1	
Labour hold		Swing		
Labour hold		Swing		
Labour hold		Swing		

=== Woolwich Riverside ===
Woolwich Riverside (3)
Party	Candidate	Votes	%	±%
Labour	Barbara Barwick	3,416	57.2	
Labour	John Fahy	3,196	53.5	
Labour	Mohammed Iqbal	2,983	49.9	
Conservative	Michael Davidson	1,298	21.7	
Conservative	Alexander Dawe	1,181	19.8	
Liberal Democrats	Sally Hooker	1,061	17.8	
Liberal Democrats	Andrew James	1,018	17.0	
Conservative	Vanessa Wright	962	16.1	
Liberal Democrats	Rachel Randall	812	13.6	
Green	Elizabeth Angas	670	11.2	
BNP	Paul Redmond	387	6.5	
Turnout		5,974	54.4	
Labour hold		Swing		
Labour hold		Swing		
Labour hold		Swing		
