= 2002 Greenwich London Borough Council election =

2002 local election in England

Map of the results of the 2002 Greenwich council election. Conservatives in blue, Labour in red and Liberal Democrats in yellow.

Elections to Greenwich Council were held in May 2002. The whole council was up for election for the first time since the 1998 election.

Greenwich local elections are held every four years. The next election was in 2006.

== Election result ==
Greenwich local election result 2002
Party	Seats	Gains	Losses	Net gain/loss	Seats %	Votes %	Votes	+/−
Labour	38							
Conservative	9							
Liberal Democrats	4							
Green	0							

== Ward results ==
Blackheath Westcombe (3)
Party	Candidate	Votes	%	±%
Labour	Alexander Grant	1,776	42.0	
Labour	Annie Keys	1,539		
Conservative	Hugh Harris	1,507	35.7	
Labour	Matthew Stiles	1,503		
Conservative	Geoffrey Brighty	1,491		
Conservative	Liz Truss	1,360		
Liberal Democrats	Michael Smart	798	18.9	
UKIP	Jeremy Elms	145	3.4	
Turnout		3,662	39.1	
Labour win (new seat)				
Labour win (new seat)				
Conservative win (new seat)				
