= 2006 Greenwich London Borough Council election =

Second-tier local general election in London, England

2006 Greenwich Council election
- 4 May 2006

All 51 seats to Greenwich London Borough Council 26 seats needed for a majority
	First party	Second party	Third party
Party	Labour	Conservative	Liberal Democrats
Seats won	36	13	2
Seat change	▼2	▲4	▼2
Popular vote	23,847	17,128	11,535
Percentage	38.1%	27.4%	18.5%
Swing	▼8.7%	▲1.4%	▼1.8%
- Map of the results of the 2006 Greenwich council election. Conservatives in blue, Labour in red and Liberal Democrats in yellow.
Council control before election
Labour
Council control after election
Labour

Elections to Greenwich Council were held on 4 May 2006. The whole council was up for election for the first time since the 2002 election.

== Election result ==
Greenwich local election result 2006
Party	Seats	Gains	Losses	Net gain/loss	Seats %	Votes %	Votes	+/−
Labour	36	1	3	▼2	70.6	38.1	23,847	▼8.7
Conservative	13	4	0	▲4	25.5	27.4	17,128	▲1.4
Liberal Democrats	2	0	2	▼2	5.9	18.5	11,535	▼1.8
Green	0	0	0	0	0.0	8.0	5,026	▲4.9
Independent	0	0	0	0	0.0	2.4	1,520	▲2.0
UKIP	0	0	0	0	0.0	2.3	1,455	▲1.2
BNP	0	0	0	0	0.0	1.6	976	New
Thamesmead Community Party	0	0	0	0	0.0	0.8	525	New
CPA	0	0	0	0	0.0	0.8	501	▲0.4

== Ward results ==
=== Abbey Wood ===
Abbey Wood (3)
Party	Candidate	Votes	%	±%
Labour	Clive Mardner	1,292	40.4	
Labour	Stephen Offord	1,191		
Labour	Jagir Kaur Sekhon	1,121		
Liberal Democrats	Thomas Headon	764	23.9	
Liberal Democrats	Bonnie Soanes	696		
Independent	June Milner	624	19.5	
Liberal Democrats	Eder Nteyoho	622		
Independent	Ismail Danesi	612		
Independent	Anthony Ward	593		
Conservative	Emily Head	519	16.2	
Conservative	Jennifer Jones	513		
Conservative	Malcolm Reid	486		
Turnout			32.3	
Labour hold		Swing		
Labour hold		Swing		
Labour hold		Swing		

=== Blackheath Westcombe ===
Blackheath Westcombe (3)
Party	Candidate	Votes	%	±%
Conservative	Geoffrey Brighty	1,496	33.9	
Conservative	Alexander Wilson	1,492		
Labour	Alexander Grant	1,461	33.1	
Labour	Jean Bloch	1,383		
Conservative	Peter Whittle	1,355		
Labour	Silke Thomson-Pottebohm	1,232		
Green	Trevor Allman	801	18.2	
Liberal Democrats	Michael Smart	655	14.8	
Liberal Democrats	Christopher Smith	624		
Liberal Democrats	Roger Spence	607		
Turnout			44.0	
Conservative gain from Labour		Swing		
Conservative hold		Swing		
Labour hold		Swing		

=== Charlton ===
Charlton (3)
Party	Candidate	Votes	%	±%
Labour	Janet Gillman	1,638	42.4	
Labour	Allan MacCarthy	1,494		
Labour	Gary Parker	1,316		
Green	Philip Connolly	697	18.0	
Conservative	Daniel Cocker	676	17.5	
Green	David Sharman	671		
Conservative	Hugh O'Leary	569		
Green	Arthur Hayles	544		
Conservative	John Letizia	519		
Liberal Democrats	Justine McGuinness	476	12.3	
Liberal Democrats	Claire Steves	445		
Liberal Democrats	Neil Stockley	388		
UKIP	David Warwicker	255	6.6	
CPA	Peter Vickers	122	3.2	
Turnout			37.3	
Labour hold		Swing		
Labour hold		Swing		
Labour hold		Swing		

=== Coldharbour and New Eltham ===
Coldharbour and New Eltham (3)
Party	Candidate	Votes	%	±%
Conservative	John Hills	1,942	48.7	
Conservative	Amanda Brinkhurst	1,877		
Conservative	Christopher Taylor	1,809		
Labour	Penelope Daniel	1,000	25.1	
Labour	David Reader	949		
Labour	Julie Grimble	911		
UKIP	Clifford Adams	566	14.2	
Liberal Democrats	Emma Lewis	483	12.1	
Liberal Democrats	Doreen Mooney	469		
Liberal Democrats	Paul Gentry	431		
Turnout			39.7	
Conservative hold		Swing		
Conservative hold		Swing		
Conservative hold		Swing		

=== Eltham North ===
Eltham North (3)
Party	Candidate	Votes	%	±%
Conservative	Spencer Drury	2,344	40.0	
Conservative	Dermot Poston	2,164		
Conservative	Nigel Fletcher	2,096		
Labour	Maresa Kingston	1,220	20.8	
Labour	Christine Walker	1,165		
Labour	Janice Marnham	1,084		
Liberal Democrats	Edward Randall	1,083	18.5	
Liberal Democrats	Anthea Gent	1,015		
Liberal Democrats	Judith Spence	871		
UKIP	Arnold Tarling	634	10.8	
Green	Marek Powley	584	10.0	
Turnout			50.0	
Conservative hold		Swing		
Conservative hold		Swing		
Conservative hold		Swing		

=== Eltham South ===
Eltham South (3)
Party	Candidate	Votes	%	±%
Conservative	Eileen Glover	1,668	44.2	
Conservative	Peter King	1,611		
Conservative	Liz Truss	1,443		
Liberal Democrats	Mark Pattenden	1,386	36.7	
Liberal Democrats	Michael Lewis	1,284		
Liberal Democrats	Elliot Shubert	1,168		
Labour	John Littlefield	720	19.1	
Labour	Terence Malone	693		
Labour	John Twidale	667		
Turnout			40.0	
Conservative hold		Swing		
Conservative hold		Swing		
Conservative gain from Liberal Democrats		Swing		

=== Eltham West ===
Eltham West (3)
Party	Candidate	Votes	%	±%
Labour	William Freeman	1,429	38.7	
Labour	Michael Hayes	1,409		
Labour	Raymond Walker	1,322		
BNP	Roberta Woods	976	26.5	
Conservative	Albert Frost	580	15.7	
Conservative	Catherine Culbert	552		
Conservative	Michael Hoskin	539		
Liberal Democrats	Eileen Cox	371	10.1	
Independent	Gerald McWilliams	332	9.0	
Liberal Democrats	Yvonne Nicholls	284		
Independent	Mutiu Olukoga	281		
Liberal Democrats	Thomas Ward	257		
Turnout			36.0	
Labour hold		Swing		
Labour hold		Swing		
Labour hold		Swing		

=== Glyndon ===
Glyndon (3)
Party	Candidate	Votes	%	±%
Labour	Donald Austen	1,796	60.0	
Labour	Paul Tyler	1,597		
Labour	John Wakefield	1,459		
Liberal Democrats	Leonie Barron	665	22.2	
Liberal Democrats	Martin Jenkins	595		
Liberal Democrats	Anthony Greville	532		
Conservative	David Branch	530	17.7	
Conservative	Sean Pearson	522		
Conservative	Richard Shackleton	468		
Turnout			30.0	
Labour hold		Swing		
Labour hold		Swing		
Labour hold		Swing		

=== Greenwich West ===
Greenwich West (3)
Party	Candidate	Votes	%	±%
Labour	Maureen O'Mara	1,406	35.5	
Labour	David Grant	1,304		
Labour	Margaret Mythen	1,189		
Liberal Democrats	Suzanne Miller	1,106	28.0	
Liberal Democrats	Andrew Smith	1,034		
Liberal Democrats	Edward Hill	920		
Green	Robin Stott	754	19.1	
Conservative	Simon Gallie	691	17.5	
Conservative	Robert Dougans	632		
Conservative	Asif Bhatti	552		
Turnout			35.0	
Labour hold		Swing		
Labour hold		Swing		
Labour hold		Swing		

=== Kidbrooke with Hornfair ===
Kidbrooke with Hornfair
Party	Candidate	Votes	%	±%
Conservative	Graeme Coombes	1,305	36.8	
Labour	Norman Adams	1,250	35.3	
Conservative	Andy Jennings	1,235		
Labour	David Gardner	1,220		
Labour	Ann Jefferson	1,194		
Conservative	Jackie Doyle-Price	1,187		
Green	Jasmine Deol	503	14.2	
Liberal Democrats	Mary Green	484	13.7	
Liberal Democrats	Ian Dickson	476		
Liberal Democrats	Harry Potter	408		
Turnout			35.6	
Conservative gain from Labour		Swing		
Labour hold		Swing		
Conservative gain from Labour		Swing		

=== Middle Park and Sutcliffe ===
Middle Park and Sutcliffe (3)
Party	Candidate	Votes	%	±%
Liberal Democrats	Brian Woodcraft	1,461	39.7	
Labour	Clare Morris	1,404	38.1	
Liberal Democrats	Paul Webbewood	1,368		
Labour	Peter Challis	1,367		
Liberal Democrats	Ian Gerrard	1,357		
Labour	Barry Taylor	1,283		
Conservative	Janine Stevens	817	22.2	
Conservative	Ryan Acty	814		
Conservative	James Ford	773		
Turnout			40.7	
Liberal Democrats hold		Swing		
Labour gain from Liberal Democrats		Swing		
Liberal Democrats hold		Swing		

=== Peninsula ===
Peninsula (3)
Party	Candidate	Votes	%	±%
Labour	Mary Mills	1,387	39.9	
Labour	Richard Quibell	1,153		
Labour	Christopher Roberts	1,125		
Green	Lucy Early	877	25.2	
Liberal Democrats	Alexander Cunliffe	610	17.5	
Conservative	Duncan McCourt	603	17.3	
Conservative	Robert Kerby	599		
Liberal Democrats	Rupert Wainwright	589		
Liberal Democrats	Denys Robinson	543		
Conservative	James Worron	532		
Turnout			35.3	
Labour hold		Swing		
Labour hold		Swing		
Labour hold		Swing		

=== Plumstead ===
Plumstead (3)
Party	Candidate	Votes	%	±%
Labour	Angela Cornforth	1,651	46.7	
Labour	Kanta Patel	1,389		
Labour	Sajid Jawaid	1,380		
Conservative	Simon Emmett	808	22.8	
Conservative	Philip Hendren	767		
Conservative	Stephen Hartigan	755		
Liberal Democrats	Steven Toole	683	19.3	
Liberal Democrats	Biljana Glusica	514		
Liberal Democrats	Abdul Rauf	499		
Independent	Harbhajan Singh	395	11.2	
Turnout			33.8	
Labour hold		Swing		
Labour hold		Swing		
Labour hold		Swing		

=== Shooters Hill ===
Shooters Hill (3)
Party	Candidate	Votes	%	±%
Labour	John Kelly	1,589	41.9	
Labour	Danny Thorpe	1,540		
Labour	Denise Hyland	1,527		
Conservative	Linda Cunningham	1,409	37.1	
Conservative	Liz Drury	1,393		
Conservative	Simon Tee	1,326		
Liberal Democrats	Sylvia Derrick-Reeve	796	21.0	
Liberal Democrats	Edward Ottery	736		
Liberal Democrats	Michael Westcombe	660		
Turnout			42.0	
Labour hold		Swing		
Labour hold		Swing		
Labour hold		Swing		

=== Thamesmead Moorings ===
Thamesmead Moorings (3)
Party	Candidate	Votes	%	±%
Labour	Peter Brooks	1,338	45.6	
Labour	Jacqueline Smith	1,165		
Labour	Peter Kotz	1,122		
Conservative	Toks Bailey	525	17.9	
Thamesmead Community Party	Julie Dixon	525	17.9	
Conservative	James Flynn	520		
Conservative	Laura Murphy	505		
Thamesmead Community Party	Craig Honeyman	461		
Thamesmead Community Party	Gary Redding	407		
CPA	Lanre Joda	379	12.9	
CPA	Stephen Hammond	321		
CPA	Chipo Maporisa	266		
Independent	Charles Soyoye	169	5.8	
Turnout			25.0	
Labour hold		Swing		
Labour hold		Swing		
Labour hold		Swing		

=== Woolwich Common ===
Woolwich Common (3)
Party	Candidate	Votes	%	±%
Labour	Beverley Jones	1,654	61.9	
Labour	Rajwant Singh Sidhu	1,537		
Labour	Harpinder Singh	1,449		
Liberal Democrats	Colin Fromings	512	19.2	
Conservative	Graham Brinkhurst	506	18.9	
Liberal Democrats	Simon Powis	481		
Conservative	Derek Williams	471		
Conservative	Lela Sisauri	446		
Liberal Democrats	Anthony Durham	440		
Turnout			28.1	
Labour hold		Swing		
Labour hold		Swing		
Labour hold		Swing		

=== Woolwich Riverside ===
Woolwich Riverside (3)
Party	Candidate	Votes	%	±%
Labour	Barbara Barwick	1,612	51.5	
Labour	Terry Hales	1,483		
Labour	John Fahy	1,422		
Green	Elizabeth Angas	810	25.9	
Conservative	Susan Hardy	709	22.6	
Conservative	Christopher Jones	639		
Conservative	Stuart Barrow	499		
Turnout			28.0	
Labour hold		Swing		
Labour hold		Swing		
Labour hold		Swing		
