= Fellowship Party =

- Leader: Sidney Fagan
- General Secretary: Roy Mallone
- Founded: 11 June 1955
- Dissolved: 20 August 2007
- Headquarters: Woolacombe House, 141 Woolacombe Road, Blackheath, London SE3 8QP
- Ideology: Environmentalism; Pacifism; Christian socialism Eco-socialism

The Fellowship Party was an environmentalist political party in England from 1955 to 2007. It opposed all weapons as well as nuclear power. Its national petition against nuclear weapons tests contributed to the forming of the Campaign for Nuclear Disarmament.

== History ==
The party was founded on 11 June 1955, following an independent anti-H Bomb candidature by John Loverseed, a former Common Wealth Party Member of Parliament. Other founding members included Eric Fenner (Battersea South candidate), Ronald Mallone, George Onion and forty pacifists and advocates of total disarmament and common ownership of the means of production, distribution and exchange (socialism).

It contested general elections from 1959 to 1997 and council elections from 1955 to 2002. It stood parliamentary candidates in Woolwich West, Tottenham, Birmingham and Greenwich, in addition to several by-elections. It also contested elections for the Greater London Council and the Inner London Education Authority. It contested elections in Blackheath, Chatham, Lancaster, Leigh, Paddington, Peterborough, West Greenwich and Kidbrooke with Hornfair. The highest vote was 792 (3.6%) for Mallone in Greenwich in 1971.

Life members included Benjamin Britten, Lady Clare Annesley and Stuart Morris. Its presidents included Sidney Hinkes, Donald Swann the composer and stage star, Rowland Hilder the painter and Frank Merrick the composer. Vice-presidents included Leo McKern the actor, scientists Kathleen Lonsdale and Professor Charles Coulson, Benjamin Britten, Sybil Morrison, Sybil Thorndike the actress, Vera Brittain, Dr Albert Belden and Professor Glenn Paige. In elections supporters included Spike Milligan and the Revd Dr Kenneth Greet.

The party continued for many years under Ronald Mallone's direction, based in Blackheath, London. It was registered with the Electoral Commission as the Fellowship Party - Peacemaking, Social Justice and Environmentalist, with a registered emblem of an upright sword cancelled by the cross of St Andrew, until 2007. Its registered leader and nomination officer in 2007 was Sidney Fagan, with Ronald Mallone as Treasurer. It voluntarily de-registered on 20 August 2007.

The Fellowship Party published the hand-duplicated subscription magazine Day by Day for 45 years, until Mallone's death aged 92 in 2009.

== See also ==
- Peace Party (UK)
