= Peninsula (ward) =

- Former electoral ward for the Greenwich London Borough Council
- Peninsula ward boundaries
- Borough: Greenwich
- County: Greater London
- Major settlements: Greenwich Peninsula

Former electoral ward
- Created: 2002
- Abolished: 2022
- Councillors: 3
- Replaced by: Charlton Village and Riverside, East Greenwich, Greenwich Peninsula
- GSS code: E05000225

Peninsula was an electoral ward in the Royal Borough of Greenwich. The ward was first used in the 2002 elections and last used for the 2018 elections. It returned three councillors to Greenwich London Borough Council.

== Greenwich council elections ==
=== 2018 election ===
The election took place on 3 May 2018.

2018 Greenwich London Borough Council election: Peninsula
| Party | Candidate | Votes | % | ±% |
|---|---|---|---|---|
| Labour Co-op | Stephen Brain | 2,470 | 47.0 | |
| Labour Co-op | Chris Lloyd | 2,274 | 43.2 | |
| Labour Co-op | Denise Scott-McDonald | 2,271 | 43.2 | |
| Green | Matt Browne | 1,808 | 34.4 | |
| Green | Dan Garrun | 1,587 | 30.3 | |
| Green | Jenny Murphy | 1,539 | 29.3 | |
| Conservative | Ben Green | 790 | 15.0 | |
| Conservative | Antony Higginbotham | 702 | 13.4 | |
| Conservative | Reece Smith | 664 | 12.6 | |
| Liberal Democrats | Richard Chamberlain | 396 | 7.5 | |
| Liberal Democrats | Matthew Ferguson | 379 | 7.2 | |
| Liberal Democrats | Andrew Smith | 334 | 6.4 | |
| Majority | | | | |
| Turnout | | | 36.0 | |
| Labour hold | | Swing | | |
| Labour hold | | Swing | | |
| Labour hold | | Swing | | |

=== 2014 election ===
The election took place on 22 May 2014.

2014 Greenwich London Borough Council election: Peninsula
| Party | Candidate | Votes | % | ±% |
|---|---|---|---|---|
| Labour Co-op | Stephen Brain | 1,926 | 48.5 | |
| Labour Co-op | Denise Scott-McDonald | 1,771 | 44.6 | |
| Labour Co-op | Chris Lloyd | 1,614 | 40.6 | |
| Green | Jan King | 789 | 19.8 | |
| Green | Philip Connolly | 757 | 19.0 | |
| Green | Harry Methley | 749 | 18.8 | |
| Conservative | Maya Mann | 730 | 18.4 | |
| Conservative | Piers Tweddell | 665 | 16.7 | |
| Green | Tim Wilson | 609 | 15.3 | |
| UKIP | Radcliffe Gillian | 540 | 13.6 | |
| Liberal Democrats | Christopher Brand | 296 | 7.4 | |
| Liberal Democrats | Anthony Durham | 219 | 5.5 | |
| Liberal Democrats | George Mcfarlane | 205 | 5.2 | |
| Independent | Terry Wheeler | 177 | 4.5 | |
| Majority | | | | |
| Turnout | | 3,975 | 38.0 | |
| Labour hold | | Swing | | |
| Labour hold | | Swing | | |
| Labour hold | | Swing | | |

=== 2010 election ===
The election on 6 May 2010 took place on the same day as the United Kingdom general election.

=== 2006 election ===
The election took place on 4 May 2006.

=== 2002 election ===
The election took place on 2 May 2002.
