= 2018 London local elections =

- 3 May 2018

All 1,833 councillors on all 32 London boroughs and 4 directly-elected mayors
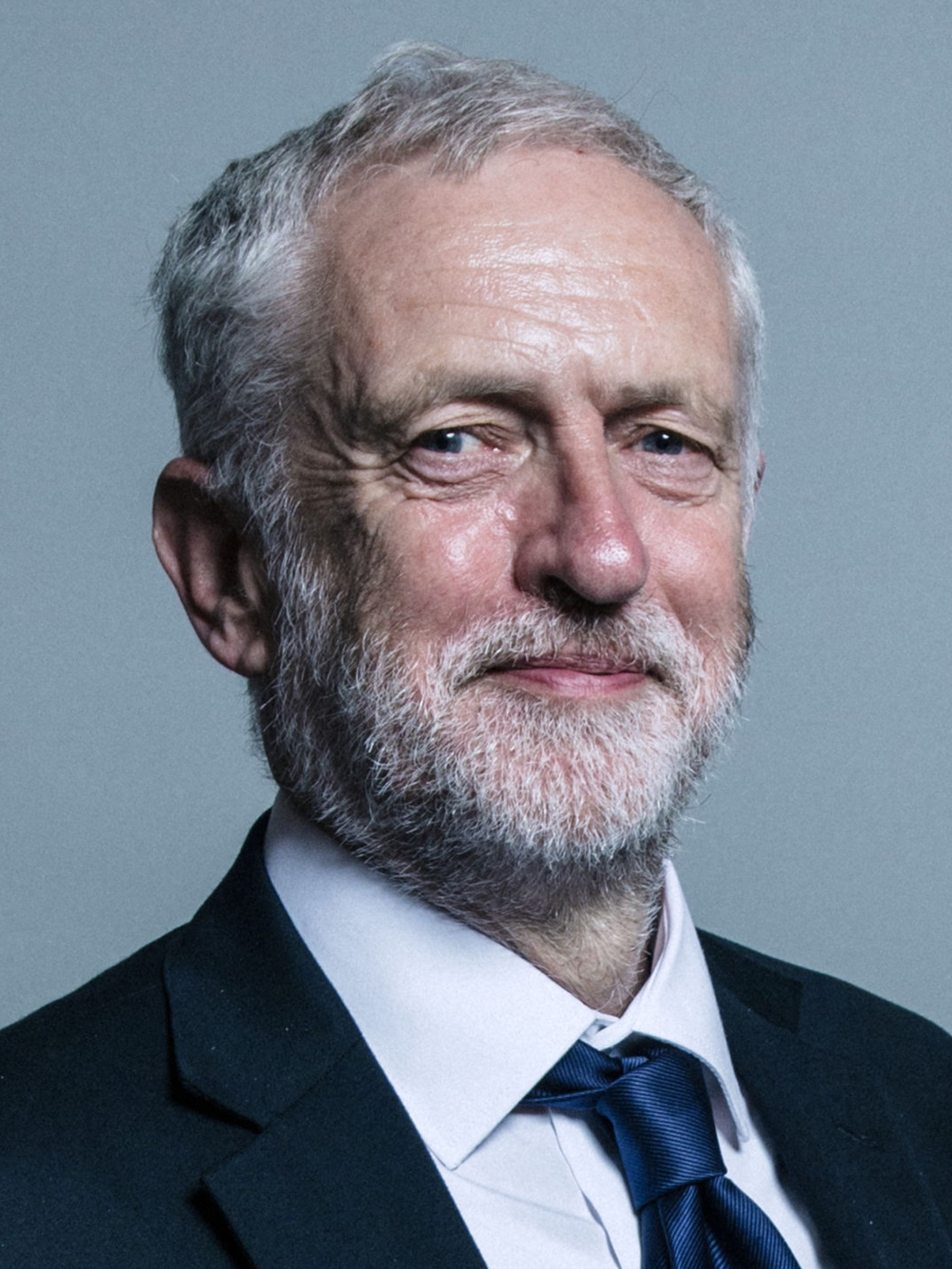

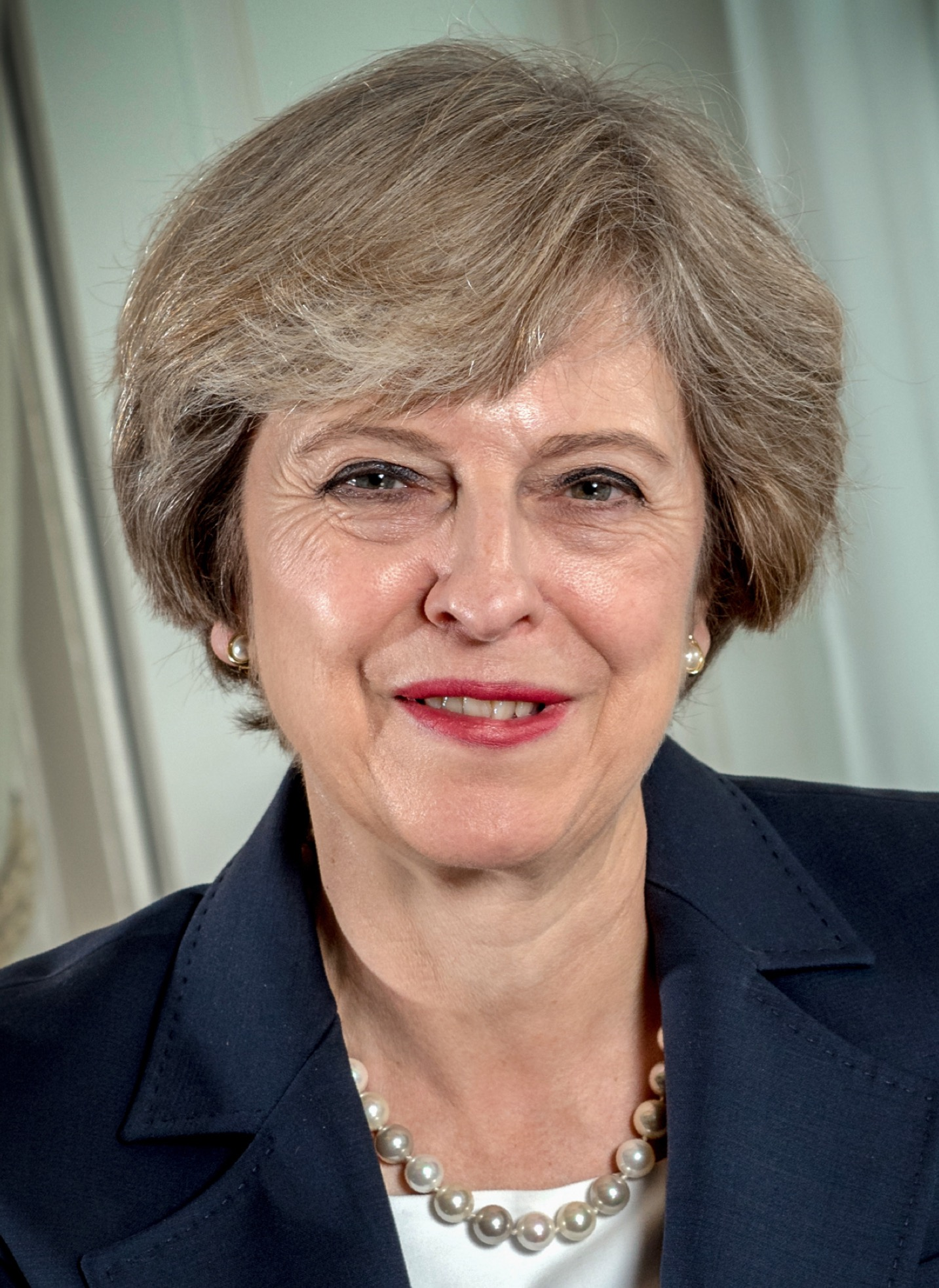

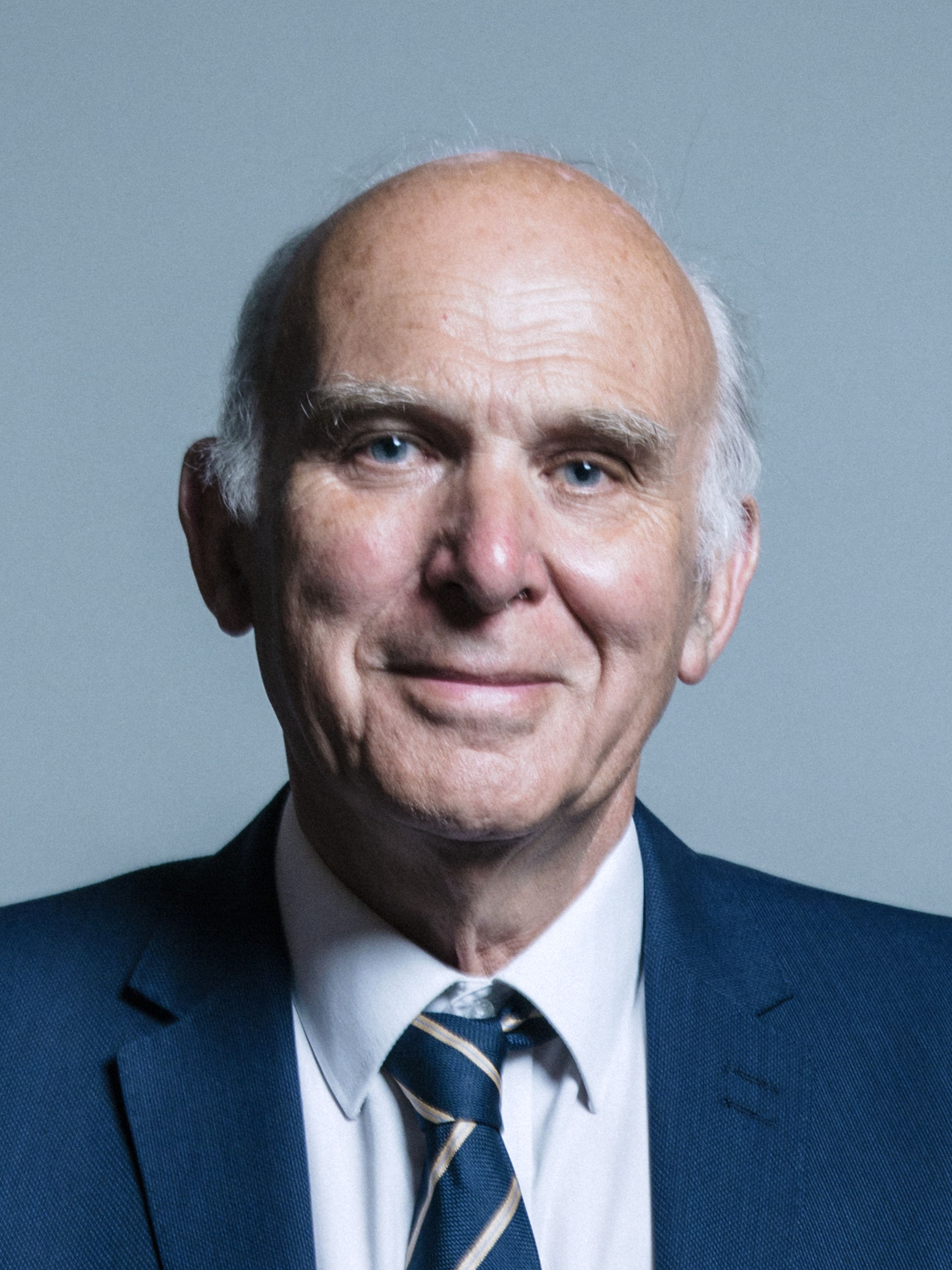

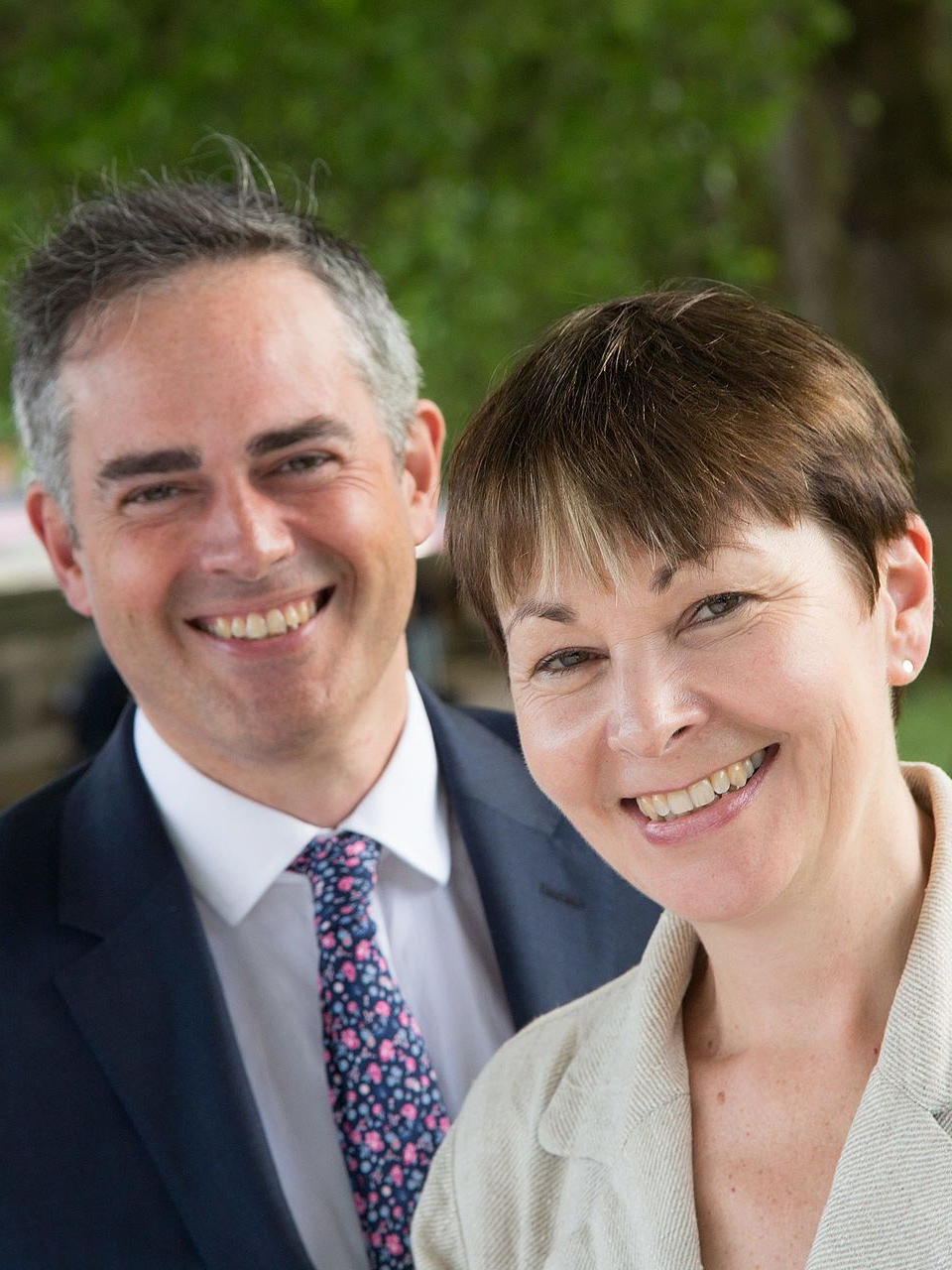
	First party	Second party
Leader	Jeremy Corbyn	Theresa May
Party	Labour	Conservative
Popular vote	1,076,934	707,724
Percentage	43.7%	28.7%
Swing	▲6.1%	▲2.3%
Councils	21	7
Councils +/–	▲1	▼2
Councillors	1,128	508
Councillors +/–	▲67*	▼92*
	Third party	Fourth party
Leader	Vince Cable	Caroline Lucas & Jonathan Bartley
Party	Liberal Democrats	Green
Popular vote	323,074	218,842
Percentage	13.1%	8.9%
Swing	▲2.5%	▼0.9%
Councils	3	0
Councils +/–	▲2	Steady
Councillors	152	11
Councillors +/–	▲34*	▲7*
- Map showing London borough councils by political control following the elections, as shown in the main table of results. Black denotes no overall control.^{*}Due to boundary changes, these seat change figures are notional changes calculated by the BBC, and so will not precisely match up with the results of the 2014 London local elections.

The 2018 London local elections took place in London on 3 May 2018 as part of wider local elections in England. All London borough councillor seats were up for election. Elections to the Corporation of London were held in 2017. Mayoral contests were also held in Hackney, Lewisham, Newham and Tower Hamlets. The previous London borough elections were in 2014.

The results saw the London Labour Party achieve their best result in over 45 years, winning 44% of the vote, 1,128 councillors and control of 21 councils. This represented the party's second-best result in a London local election, only surpassed slightly by its 1971 total. The London Conservatives, by contrast, lost 92 seats to finish with 508 councillors, its lowest-ever tally of seats in a London local election. However, it retained control of 7 councils, having lost two to the London Liberal Democrats. The party's vote share increased by 2%, but at 28.7%, it was still the second-worst popular vote total for the Conservatives in the history of the London Boroughs. The London Liberal Democrats made a recovery from their all-time low in the 2014 election, gaining 34 council seats and winning two councils from the Conservatives. Among the other parties, the London Green Party was the most successful, winning a total of 11 council seats, just below their all-time high of 12 in the 2006 election. Support for the UK Independence Party collapsed, with the party losing all of its seats and dropping from 9.5% of the vote to 0.8%. The only other parties to win seats were the People's Alliance of Tower Hamlets (1 seat) and the Harold Hill Independent Party (1 seat).

== Eligibility to vote ==
All registered electors (British, Irish, Commonwealth and European Union citizens) who are aged 18 or over on polling day were entitled to vote in the local elections. A person who has two homes (such as a university student having a term-time address and living at home during holidays) can register to vote at both addresses as long as they are not in the same electoral area, and can vote in the local elections for the two different local councils.

== Results summary ==
Party	Votes won	% votes	Change	Seats	% seats	Change^{†}	Councils	Change
Labour	1,076,934	43.7	▲6.1	1,128	61.5	▲67	21	▲1
Conservative	707,724	28.7	▲2.3	508	27.7	▼92	7	▼2
Liberal Democrats	323,074	13.1	▲2.5	152	8.3	▲34	3	▲2
Green	218,842	8.9	▼0.9	11	0.6	▲7	0	Steady
UKIP	20,599	0.8	▼8.7	0	0.0	▼9	0	Steady
Others	116,962	4.8	▼1.3	34	1.9	▲7	0	Steady
No overall control	—N/a						1	▼1

^{†}Due to boundary changes, the figures for seat losses/gains are notional changes calculated by the BBC, and do not match up precisely to the London-wide results in 2014.

== Councils results ==
=== Control ===
Council	2014 result	Eve-of-poll control	2018 result	Turnout (%)	Details
Barking and Dagenham	Labour	Labour	Labour	29.5	Details
Barnet	Conservative	No overall control	Conservative	43.7	Details
Bexley (Note: In Bexley there were boundary changes and a reduced number of seats in the 2018 election.)	Conservative	Conservative	Conservative	37.5	Details
Brent (Note: In Willesden Green, polling day was delayed to 21 June 2018 due to the death of the local councillor, Lesley Jones, the vacant three seats were eventually won by Labour.)	Labour	Labour	Labour	36.7	Details
Bromley	Conservative	Conservative	Conservative	40.0	Details
Camden	Labour	Labour	Labour	37.3	Details
Croydon	Labour	Labour	Labour	38.1	Details
Ealing	Labour	Labour	Labour	41.3	Details
Enfield	Labour	Labour	Labour	38.2	Details
Greenwich	Labour	Labour	Labour	36.1	Details
Hackney	Labour	Labour	Labour	37.0	Details
Hammersmith and Fulham	Labour	Labour	Labour	39.4	Details
Haringey	Labour	Labour	Labour	38.8	Details
Harrow	Labour	Labour	Labour	41.0	Details
Havering	No overall control	No overall control	No overall control	36.8	Details
Hillingdon	Conservative	Conservative	Conservative	38.3	Details
Hounslow	Labour	Labour	Labour	36.6	Details
Islington	Labour	Labour	Labour	38.4	Details
Kensington and Chelsea	Conservative	Conservative	Conservative	39.7	Details
Kingston upon Thames	Conservative	Conservative	Liberal Democrats	47.3	Details
Lambeth	Labour	Labour	Labour	34.3	Details
Lewisham	Labour	Labour	Labour	37.3	Details
Merton	Labour	Labour	Labour	41.1	Details
Newham	Labour	Labour	Labour	35.8	Details
Redbridge	Labour	Labour	Labour	38.8	Details
Richmond upon Thames	Conservative	Conservative	Liberal Democrats	51.4	Details
Southwark	Labour	Labour	Labour	33.6	Details
Sutton	Liberal Democrats	Liberal Democrats	Liberal Democrats	41.2	Details
Tower Hamlets	No overall control	No overall control	Labour	41.8	Details
Waltham Forest	Labour	Labour	Labour	37.8	Details
Wandsworth	Conservative	Conservative	Conservative	43.6	Details
Westminster	Conservative	Conservative	Conservative	38.0	Details

=== Councillors ===
The table below shows the number of councillors won by each party for each council in London. The shaded cells show the party or parties in each council's governing administration.

Council	Lab	Con	Lib Dem	Green	Others	Turnout (%)	Details
Barking and Dagenham	51	0	0	0	0	29.5	Details
Barnet	25	38	0	0	0	43.7	Details
Bexley (Note: In Bexley there were boundary changes and a reduced number of seats in the 2018 election.)	11	34	0	0	0	37.5	Details
Brent (Note: In Willesden Green, polling day was delayed to 21 June 2018 due to the death of the local councillor, Lesley Jones, the vacant three seats were eventually won by Labour.)	60	3	0	0	0	36.7	Details
Bromley	8	50	0	0	2 Independent: 2	40.0	Details
Camden	43	7	3	1	0	37.3	Details
Croydon	41	29	0	0	0	38.1	Details
Ealing	57	8	4	0	0	41.3	Details
Enfield	46	17	0	0	0	38.2	Details
Greenwich	42	9	0	0	0	36.1	Details
Hackney	52	5	0	0	0	37.0	Details
Hammersmith and Fulham	35	11	0	0	0	39.4	Details
Haringey	42	0	15	0	0	38.8	Details
Harrow	35	28	0	0	0	41.0	Details
Havering	5	25	0	0	24 Residents groups: 23 (opposition); Independent: 1 (coalition)	36.8	Details
Hillingdon	21	44	0	0	0	38.3	Details
Hounslow	51	9	0	0	0	36.6	Details
Islington	47	0	0	1	0	38.4	Details
Kensington and Chelsea	13	36	1	0	0	39.7	Details
Kingston upon Thames	0	9	39	0	0	47.3	Details
Lambeth	57	1	0	5	0	34.3	Details
Lewisham	54	0	0	0	0	37.3	Details
Merton	34	17	6	0	3 Merton Park Ward Residents Association: 3	41.1	Details
Newham	60	0	0	0	0	35.8	Details
Redbridge	51	12	0	0	0	38.8	Details
Richmond upon Thames	0	11	39	4	0	51.4	Details
Southwark	49	0	11	0	0	33.6	Details
Sutton	0	18	33	0	3 Independent: 3	41.2	Details
Tower Hamlets	42	2	0	0	1 People's Alliance of Tower Hamlets: 1	41.8	Details
Waltham Forest	46	14	0	0	0	37.8	Details
Wandsworth	26	33	0	0	1 Independent: 1	43.6	Details
Westminster	19	41	0	0	0	38.0	Details

== Mayoral elections ==
There were four mayoral elections.

Local authority	Previous Mayor	New Mayor
Hackney	Philip Glanville (Labour)	Philip Glanville (Labour)
Lewisham	Steve Bullock (Labour)	Damien Egan (Labour)
Newham	Robin Wales (Labour)	Rokhsana Fiaz (Labour)
Tower Hamlets	John Biggs (Labour) (Note: The 2014 election was initially won by Tower Hamlets First, but this result was overturned by an election court decision and Labour won the following by-election.)	John Biggs (Labour)

== Ward result maps ==
=== London-wide ===
The map below shows the results for each ward across the whole of Greater London.

2018 London local elections results map

=== By borough ===
Barking and Dagenham 2018 results map

Barnet 2018 results map

Bexley 2018 results map

Brent 2018 results map

Bromley 2018 results map

Camden 2018 results map

Croydon 2018 results map

Ealing 2018 results map

Enfield 2018 results map

Greenwich 2018 results map

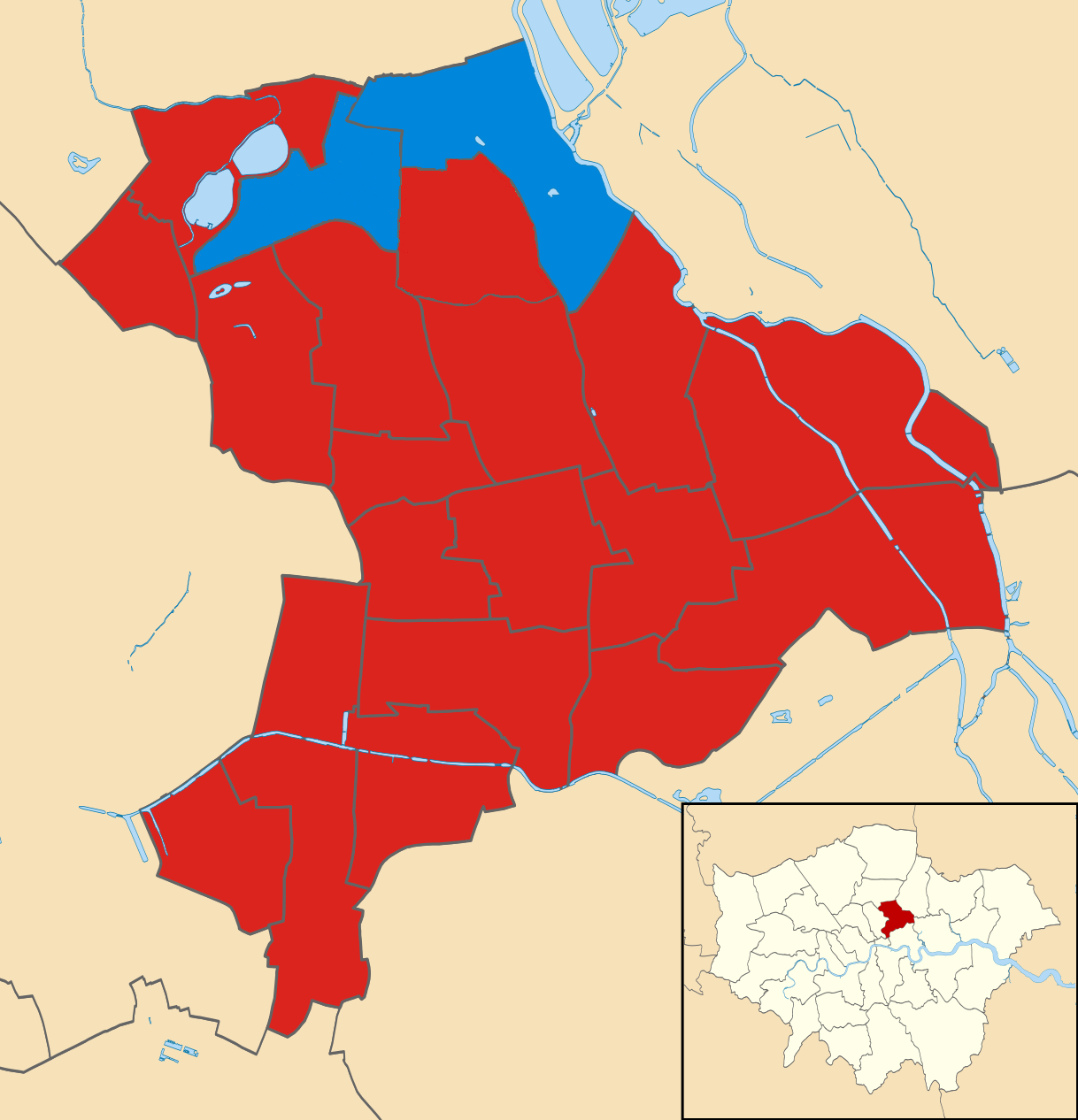
Hackney 2018 results map

Hammersmith and Fulham 2018 results map

Haringey 2018 results map

Harrow 2018 results map

Havering 2018 results map

Hillingdon 2018 results map

Hounslow 2018 results map

Islington 2018 results map

Kensington and Chelsea 2018 results map

Kingston upon Thames 2018 results map

Lambeth 2018 results map

Lewisham 2018 results map

Merton 2018 results map

Newham 2018 results map

Redbridge 2018 results map

Richmond Upon Thames 2018 results map

Southwark 2018 results map

Sutton 2018 results map

Tower Hamlets 2018 results map

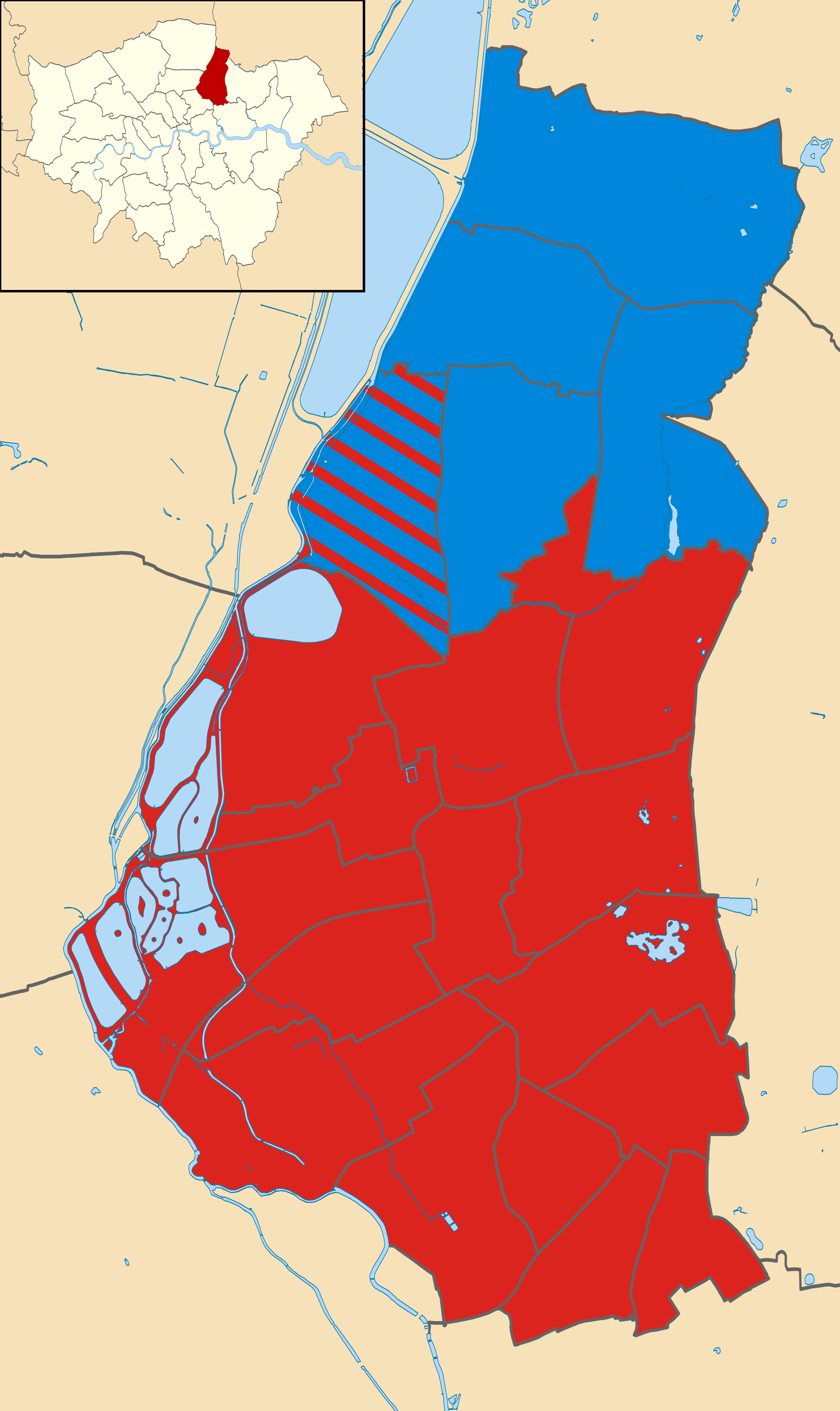
Waltham Forest 2018 results map

Wandsworth 2018 results map

Westminster 2018 results map

== Opinion polling ==
Date(s) conducted	Polling organisation/client	Sample size	Lab	Con	Lib Dem	Green	Others	Lead
3 May 2018	2018 elections	n/a	43.7%	28.7%	13.1%	8.9%	5.6%	15.0%
27-30 April 2018	Survation / 4in10	1,005	51%	31%	12%	4%	2%	20%
20-24 April 2018	YouGov / QMUL	1,099	51%	29%	11%	4%	5%	22%
12-15 Feb 2018	YouGov / QMUL	1,155	54%	28%	11%	4%	3%	26%
25-29 Sep 2017	YouGov / QMUL	1,044	53%	29%	12%	–	6%	24%
22 May 2014	2014 elections	2,515,073	37.6%	26.4%	10.6%	9.8%	15.6%	11.2%
