= Labour Muslim Network =

Islamic political organization based in the United Kingdom

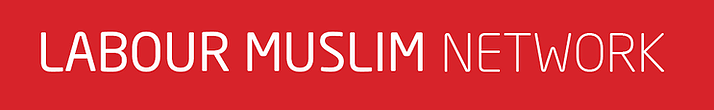
- Abbreviation: LMN
- Formation: 2016
- Type: Campaign group
- Legal status: Active
- Location: United Kingdom
- Region served: United Kingdom
- Key people: Parliamentary Chair: Afzal Khan
- Parent organisation: Labour Party
- Website: www.labourmuslims.org

The Labour Muslim Network is a British campaign group associated with the Labour Party, focused on Muslim matters. Labour MP Afzal Khan is the parliamentary chair for the group. The purpose of the group is to promote Muslim engagement and representation in the Labour Party, conduct political training and development activities, and lead on political campaigns. It is the largest Muslim group of Labour members and supporters.

Following on the from establishment of the LabourMuslims Twitter feed in September 2016, and a website in mid-2017, the group had its official launch on 11 December 2017 at the House of Commons, with the stated aim of being an "inclusive organisation which seeks to support British Muslims' engagement in the political process and with the Labour Party, based on shared values of social justice and equality." The launch was attended by party leader Jeremy Corbyn, as well as MPs Andy Slaughter, Wes Streeting, Dawn Butler, Rupa Huq and Afzal Khan. The group brought together a broad coalition of Muslim politicians and activists within the Labour party, including Khalid Mahmood (England's first Muslim MP), local councillors, and grass roots activists. Ali Milani, a former Vice-President of the National Union of Students, chaired the launch as an executive member of the group.

The presence of Milani as an executive member was criticised by The Jewish Chronicle on the basis of alleged antisemitic social media comments he had made as a teenager (which Milani had later apologised for). Shia news organisation Shafaqna noted the presence of Islamists and neo-conservatives at the launch, and expressed concern about the risks of the group acting in those interests. Milani was the unsuccessful Labour candidate in Uxbridge and South Ruislip at the 2019 general election, at which he came second to the Conservative incumbent, prime minister Boris Johnson.

== 2020 report into Islamophobia ==
The group published the Islamophobia and the Muslim Experience report into prejudice within the Labour Party in November 2020, which revealed that half of respondents to their survey of Muslim members said that they did not trust the party leadership to address Islamophobia, 29% had directly experienced Islamophobia in the party, and that 56% did not believe that the Shadow Cabinet of Keir Starmer represented the Muslim community effectively. Published two weeks after the Equality and Human Rights Commission's report on antisemitism in the Labour Party, respondents also reported feeling a hierarchy of racism in the party, where other forms of racism were given more attention than Islamophobia.

The group also contains the Muslim Councillor Network initiative, which brings the party's Muslim local representatives together.

The group is separate from the British Muslim Friends of Labour group.

== Leadership ==
Parliamentary chair

- Afzal Khan

National executive members

- Ibrahim Abdille
- Samayya Afzal
- Mahamid Ahmed
- Mohamed Bux
- Huda Elmi (CLP representative on the National Executive Committee of the Labour Party)
- Ali Milani (former Parliamentary candidate)
- Fatima Said
