= East Greenwich (ward) =

- Electoral ward for the Greenwich London Borough Council
- East Greenwich ward boundaries since 2022
- Borough: Greenwich
- County: Greater London
- Population: 14,480 (2021) (Note: 2021 Census data reported for 2022 ward boundaries)
- Electorate: 10,222 (2022)
- Area: 1.138 square kilometres (0.439 sq mi)

Current electoral ward
- Created: 2022
- Number of members: 3
- Councillors: Jo Land; George Edgar; Patrick Ives
- Created from: Peninsula
- GSS code: E05014076

East Greenwich is an electoral ward in the Royal Borough of Greenwich. The ward was first used in the 2022 elections. It returns three councillors to Greenwich London Borough Council.

== Councillors ==
Election	Councillors		
2022	Maisie Richards Cottell (Labour)	Rowshan Hannan (Labour)	Majid Rahman (Labour)
2026	Jo Land (Green Party)	George Edgar (Green Party)	Patrick Ives (Green Party)

== Greenwich council elections ==
=== 2022 election ===
The election took place on 5 May 2022.

2022 Greenwich London Borough Council election: East Greenwich (3)
Party	Candidate	Votes	%	±%
Labour	Maisie Richards Cottell	1,844	48.2	
Labour	Rowshan Hannan	1,825	47.7	
Labour	Majid Rahman	1,700	44.5	
Green	Stacy Smith	1,632	42.7	
Green	Matt Browne	1,557	40.7	
Green	Karin Tearle	1,462	38.2	
Conservative	Andrea Borbely	495	12.9	
Conservative	Andrew Bell	483	12.6	
Conservative	Elliot Whittingham	396	10.4	
Liberal Democrats	Rupert Wainwright	78	2.0	
Turnout			39.6	
Labour win (new seat)				
Labour win (new seat)				
Labour win (new seat)				
