= Ali Milani =

British Labour politician (born 1994)

- علی میلانی

Hillingdon London Borough Councillor for Heathrow Villages
- In office 7 May 2018 – 5 May 2022

Personal details
- Born: Ali Reza Milani; July 1994 (age 32) Tehran, Iran
- Party: Labour
- Education: Brunel University London

Ali Milani (Persian: علی میلانی; born July 1994) is a British author, political commentator, and Labour Party politician. In 2019, he unsuccessfully stood as the party's candidate in Uxbridge and South Ruislip, a seat which was held by the then-Prime Minister Boris Johnson. Milani was a councillor for Heathrow Villages in the London Borough of Hillingdon from 2018 to 2022. He has previously served as a Vice President of the National Union of Students.

Milani was born in Tehran, Iran, and moved to the UK at the age of five. He studied International Relations at Brunel University London, where he was President of the Union of Brunel Students from 2015 until 2017. In 2017, Milani became the Vice President for Union Development at the National Union of Students (NUS), and he was re-elected in 2018.

Milani became a local councillor in Hillingdon in 2018, and was chosen in September as the Prospective Parliamentary Candidate for Uxbridge and South Ruislip. He stood against Johnson in 2019 and lost, with a 37.6% vote share, compared to Johnson's 52.6%. Al Jazeera reported that Milani's views "tilt heavily to the Labour Party's left" and Vice stated that Milani is affiliated with the grassroots left-wing movement Momentum.

In 2022, Milani published The Unlikely Candidate, which covered his experience as a political candidate and commentary on the British political system. The Speaker described the book as "both a cautionary tale and a message of hope."

== Early and personal life ==
Milani was born in July 1994 in Tehran, the Iranian capital. He moved to the UK with his family at the age of five, living in Hillingdon in London. Unable to speak any English when he arrived, Milani lived with his sister and their single mother in a council house and attended a Voluntary Aided comprehensive school, St Augustine's Church of England High School. The family received state benefits and were impacted by the Conservative–Liberal Democrat coalition government scrapping the Education Maintenance Allowance scheme in England in 2011. Milani's mother was once homeless. Milani joined the Labour Party at the age of nineteen. As of 2019, Milani's sister taught at their former school and his mother lived on disability benefits. Milani is a practising Muslim and attends Friday prayers at Brunel University London.

Milani's father, Hassan, was diagnosed with COVID-19 whilst overseas in Iran, and died in the early morning of 21 March 2020. Following this, Milani spoke out against sanctions on Iran. A coronavirus relief fundraiser, Water for Life, was founded in Hassan's name.

== University and students' unions ==
Milani studied International Relations at the Brunel University London. Whilst at university, he was elected President of the Union of Brunel Students, a role he held between 2015 and 2017. His campaign slogan was "Making Brunel work for us". He later said, in a 2017 BuzzFeed News article, that the "election campaign was one of the worst I had to go through, with all sorts of different abuse". He said attack posters were made of his face superimposed on images from the September 11 attacks, and texts were sent falsely claiming that he would shut down the bar. He referred to a "huge unspoken-about fear among Muslim students" in getting involved with student politics but said that "We will break down these barriers".

As president, Milani gave statements criticising Brunel for commercialising student accommodation, claiming that the "vast chunk" of a student loan goes to accommodation, requiring many students to work "15 to 20 hours per week". Milani said that universities "know they can" charge the amounts they do for accommodation "because the students have no choice". He also wrote that the tripling of student tuition fees to £9,000 per year caused a "psychological and cultural impact" as well as adverse economic effects, in response to a report that student wellbeing was decreasing.

Milani was also involved in the organisation of a walkout against media personality and Sun columnist Katie Hopkins. As Hopkins began speaking at a university debate, 50% of the audience turned their backs on her and left. Milani commented that "we expressed our concerns that she has no academic credibility and contributes nothing to the debate", saying that "our students find [some of her views] offensive". He said of the decision to organise a walkout that "Ms Hopkins has the right to speak, but we also have the right to express our discontent". Following the event, Milani wrote a blog article for The Huffington Post entitled "Our Students Were Right to Walk Out – Brunel Is Better Than Katie Hopkins".

Whilst president, Milani gave a statement opposing the UK government's Prevent, a counter-terrorism strategy. Milani opined that the strategy is "about grabbing one community and providing disproportionate amounts of suspicion and spying on", citing students' unions that were forced to hand over lists of Islamic society membership to police. He claimed that "Right wing extremism is almost four times more likely to be a problem on campuses and your streets than Islamic extremism".

The National Union of Students (NUS) is a confederation of 600 UK students' unions. In 2017, Milani was elected vice president for Union Development. He was re-elected as vice president for Union Development in March 2018 and served until 2019. In office, Milani supported the UCU and University staff in their pay dispute and consequent strike action and campaigned for universities to do more to tackle climate change.

== Political career ==
In the 3 May 2018 local elections, Milani was elected as a councillor in the Heathrow Villages ward of the Hillingdon London Borough Council.

In September 2018, Ali Milani was selected as the Labour Party's Prospective Parliamentary Candidate in Uxbridge and South Ruislip. Also shortlisted were NHS doctor Sonia Adesara, local party chair Jessica Beishon, trade union organiser Steve Garelick and David Williams. The seat was held by prime minister Boris Johnson. If elected, Milani would have become the first person to unseat a sitting prime minister, and the second Iranian-British person to become a Member of Parliament. Al Jazeera reported that Milani's political views "tilt heavily to the Labour Party's left" and he is affiliated with Momentum, a grassroots movement in support of former Labour leader Jeremy Corbyn.

Milani said that his campaign would be about local issues. When talking to voters he discussed action on climate change, public service investment, housing, opposition to privatisation of the National Health Service, hate crime prevention, tuition fee abolition and re-nationalisation of public services. Milani criticised incumbent Boris Johnson as "unfit to be in any public office" for what he viewed as "offensive and incendiary remarks", such as those in which Johnson used the word "piccaninnies" and compared Muslim women wearing a face veil to "letterboxes". Whilst campaigning, Milani discussed areas where he said that Johnson has failed, including the planned expansion of Heathrow Airport and Hillingdon Hospital, where children were moved out of the paediatrics department after it was ruled unsafe for use.

After being announced as a candidate, Milani was subject to death threats and an article in the Daily Mail displayed a picture of ISIS fighters alongside description of Milani. On 27 November 2019, it was reported by The Independent that Milani's odds of winning the seat had increased from 16.7% to 22.2%, making it one of the "five biggest moves" in constituency polling according to bookmaker Paddy Power. On the same date, a YouGov report classified the seat as "likely Conservative". Milani lost the election with a vote share of 37.6%, a decrease of 2.4% compared 2017. Johnson won with 52.6%, an increase of 1.8%.

Milani chaired the launch of the Labour Muslim Network in December 2017.

== Antisemitism and comments on Israel ==
In April 2017, The Independent and The Jewish Chronicle reported on alleged antisemitism among candidates for NUS positions, including several social media posts made by Milani. In one, he wrote that Israel has "no right to exist". In another, he replied to another user saying, "Nah u won't mate, it'll cost you a pound #Jew." Milani replied that his past comments were "unacceptable". He wrote, "I have apologised unreservedly for these comments before and I do so again. They do not reflect how I see the world today. These tweets are from an incredibly long time ago – when I was 16 to 17 years old."

He said in July 2019 of the controversy that "I went on an educational journey, engaged with the community and apologised on every public platform I've ever had." In November 2019 he said that: "I have lots of Jewish friends and colleagues who've sat me down, and I've learned from them. But it's within everyone's right not to accept my apology."

The Jewish Chronicle also reported on comments made by Milani on Iranian channel Press TV in 2015. Milani had led the Boycott, Divestment and Sanctions movement at Brunel University—a Palestinian-led campaign to boycott Israel. Asked on whether boycotts were an alternative to "armed struggle", Milani said that "there's no reason why we need to frame the argument as binary". He told The Jewish Chronicle that "I made it clear that BDS was a peaceful method for people in the UK to advance an end to human rights violations." He also advocated "pushing for education on this issue – specifically in schools and colleges like mine" and discussed visiting the Auschwitz concentration camp.

== Electoral performance ==
UK local elections
Date of election	Constituency	Party	Votes	% of votes	Result
2018 local elections	Hillingdon London Borough Council	Labour	1,382	48.1	Elected

In the 2018 Hillingdon London Borough Council election, Milani was the third of three elected councillors for the Heathrow Villages, finishing behind the other Labour Party candidates, Peter Money (1,517 votes) and Ingrid Nelson (1,475 votes), and ahead of the first Conservative Party candidate (1,133 votes). The turnout was 34.5%.

UK Parliament elections
Date of election	Constituency	Party	Votes	% of votes	Result
2019 general election	Uxbridge and South Ruislip	Labour	18,141	37.6	Not elected

In the 2019 general election, Ali Milani received a 37.6% vote share, with 18,141 votes, losing to Boris Johnson's 52.6% vote share (25,351 votes). This was a majority of 7,210 (15%). It marked a 1.8% increase for the Conservative Party, and 2.4% decrease for the Labour Party in Uxbridge and South Ruislip, with a turnout of 68.5%.
