= St Augustine's Church of England High School =

St. Augustine's Church of England High School

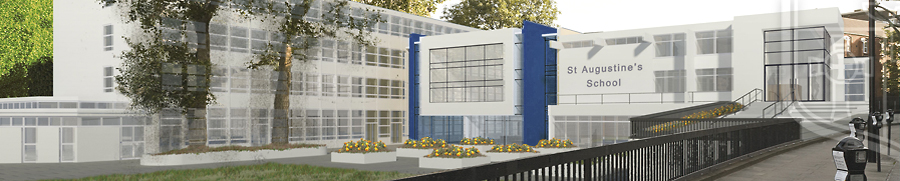

Location
- Oxford Road; Kilburn; London, NW6 5SN; England
- Coordinates: 51°32′05″N 0°11′33″W

Information
- Type: Voluntary aided school
- Religious affiliation: Church of England
- Established: 1884
- Local authority: Westminster
- Department for Education URN: 101154 Tables
- Ofsted: Reports
- Headteacher: Eugene Moriarty
- Gender: Co-educational
- Age: 11 to 19
- Enrolment: 1004 As of April 2021
- Capacity: 1000
- Houses: Aidan; Bede; Columba; David; Edward; Felix; Grace
- Colours: Blue, White
- Website: http://www.staugustineshigh.org/

St Augustine's Church of England High School is a Voluntary Aided Church of England secondary school in the West London borough of Westminster, Kilburn. The school is also a Science College and has a sixth form. St Augustine of Canterbury is the patron saint of the school. It is located adjacent to its affiliated primary school and parish church St Augustine's Church.

== History ==
The school was opened on 16 May 1870 in Andover Place with seven students, with specifically the High School opening in 1884 as an all boys' secondary school; the present division into primary and secondary schools being complete by 1951. In 1969, the present school buildings were opened, with St. Augustine's High School becoming a Church of England comprehensive school.

In February 2009, the school received investment under the BSF program for schools. The work was completed in late 2011. In May 2010 the school was given a sports centre used by both the school and the local community.

== Layout ==
The main school consists of two buildings, a larger teaching block and a smaller guest block, connected by a bridge. The teaching block is where most of the classrooms and the science laboratories are. The only subjects taught at the guest block are Music, Physical Education and Business Studies.

The layout for the school body are that there are five principal forms each named after a saint, namely -

- Aidan of Lindisfarne
- Bede
- Columba
- Saint David
- Saint Edward
- Saint Felix

These forms are used during 'form time' and occasions such as sport days or are remembered during mass at the end of every term.

== Notable former pupils ==
- Julian Golding, Commonwealth games Gold medal-winning British sprinter
- Ali Milani, Labour Party politician
- Dwayne Kerr, British entrepreneur
- Victoria Mitchell
- Bradley Wiggins, Gold medal-winning British Olympic cyclist
- Big Zuu (b. 1995) - Television personality
