= 2014 London local elections =

- 22 May 2014

All 1,851 councillors on all 32 London boroughs
- Turnout: 38.9% (▼23.1%)
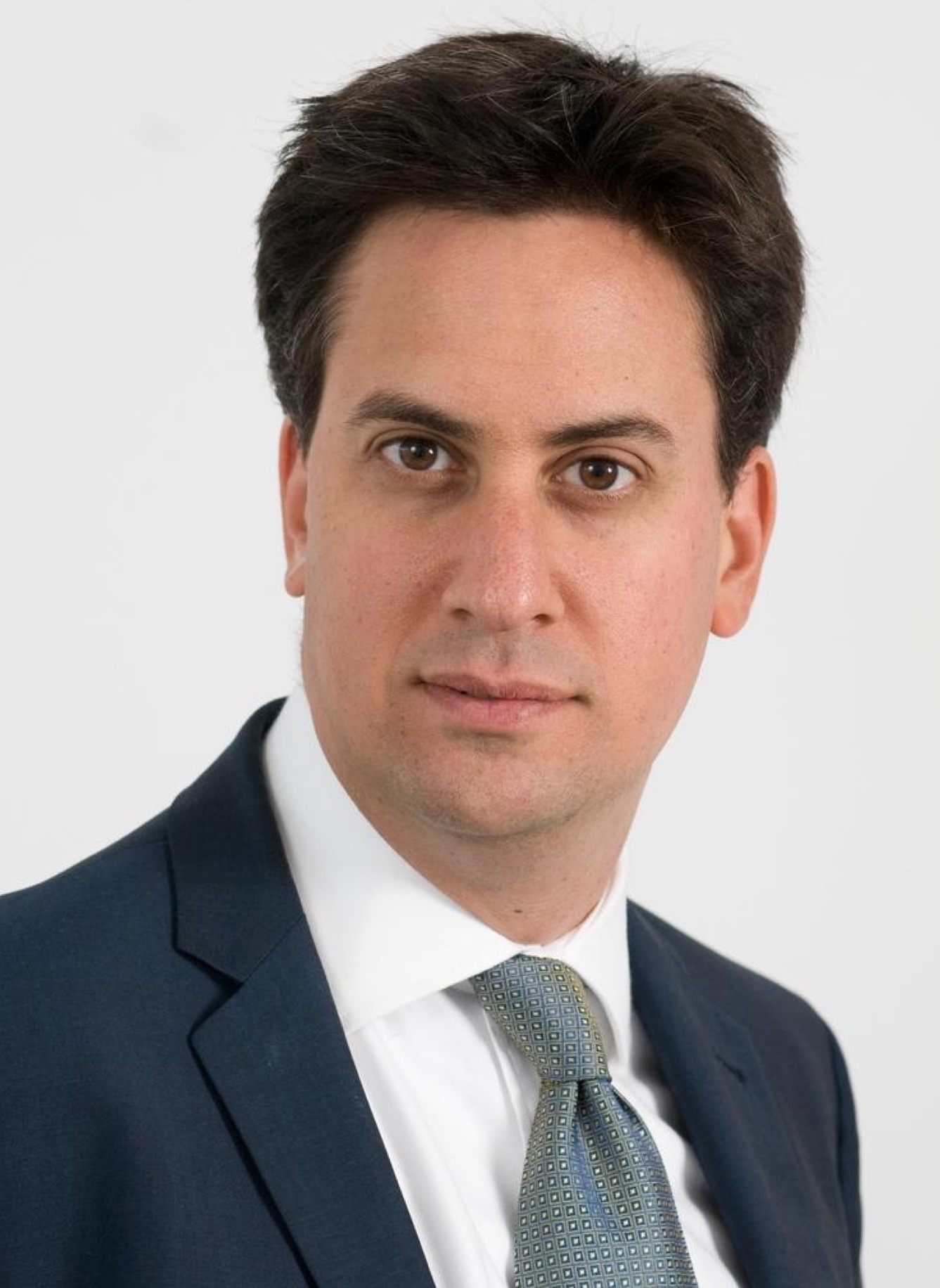

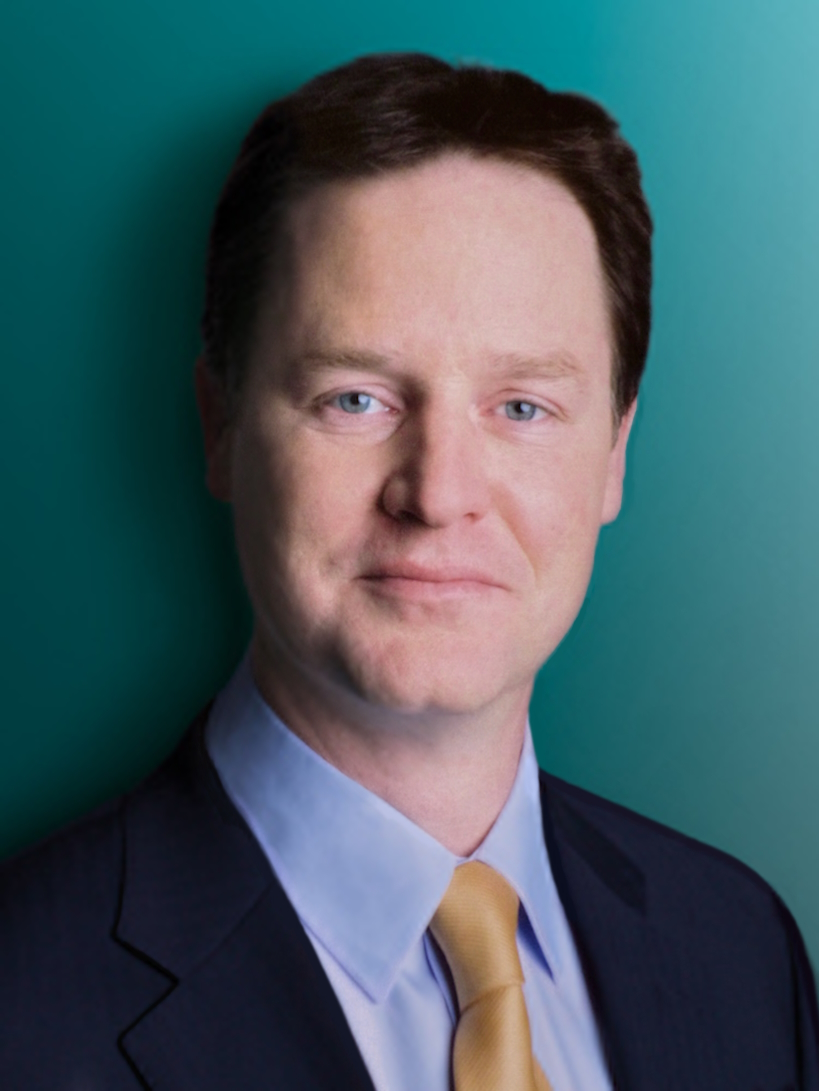

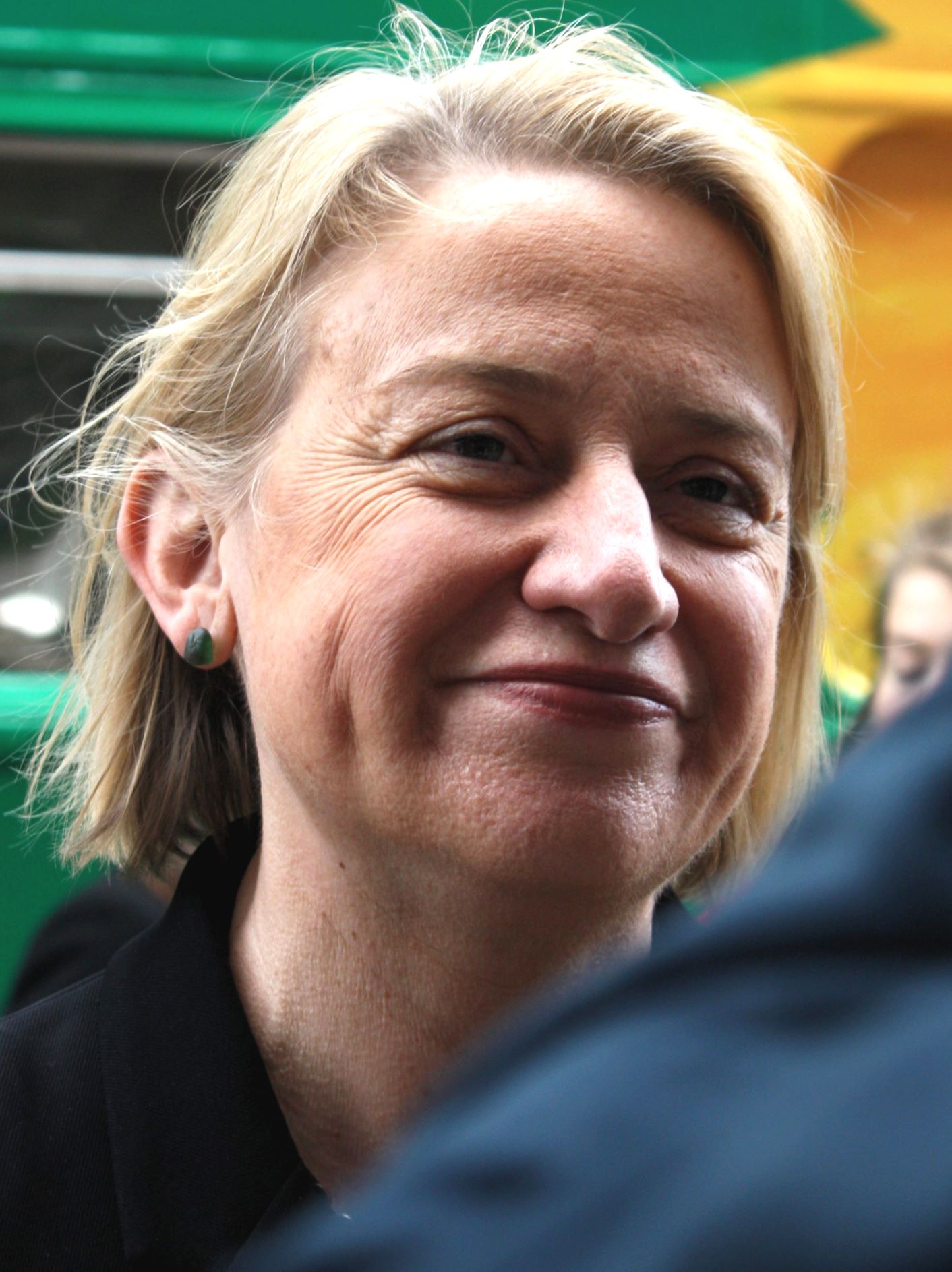
	First party	Second party
Leader	Ed Miliband	David Cameron
Party	Labour	Conservative
Popular vote	944,967	663,847
Percentage	37.6%	26.4%
Swing	▲5.1%	▼5.3%
Councils	20	9
Gain/loss	▲3	▼2
Councillors	1,060	612
Gain/loss	▲185	▼105
	Third party	Fourth party
Leader	Nick Clegg	Natalie Bennett
Party	Liberal Democrats	Green
Popular vote	267,769	246,805
Percentage	10.6%	9.8%
Swing	▼11.8%	▲3.2%
Councils	1	0
Gain/loss	▼1	Steady
Councillors	116	4
Gain/loss	▼130	▲2
- London borough councils by political control following election. Councils that are Labour are in red, Conservative in blue, Liberal Democrat in yellow and two in no overall control party-politically are in black.

There were local government elections in London on Thursday 22 May 2014. All councillor seats on the 32 London borough councils were up for election. The electorates of Hackney, Lewisham, Newham and Tower Hamlets also elected their executive mayors, who operate in place of council leaders in those boroughs. Ward changes took place in Hackney, Kensington and Chelsea, and Tower Hamlets, which reduced the total number of councillors by 10 to 1,851. Both the mayoral and councillor elections are four-yearly.

The results saw London Labour achieve their best result in over 40 years, winning 1,060 councillors, control of 20 out of 32 councils and 38% of the popular vote (their highest since 1998). Only the elections of 1964, 1971 and 1974 have seen Labour win more than 1,060 council seats in London, and Labour has not controlled 20 councils or more since 1971. This result was subsequently surpassed by the party's performance in the 2018 elections.

The London Conservatives dropped to their lowest-ever percentage of the vote in a London local election, at just 26.4%, and fell to their lowest councillor total since 1998. The London Liberal Democrats' vote halved, with the party dropping to 11% of the popular vote and 116 seats (down 130), the worst result for the Lib Dems or the Liberals since 1978.

The election saw a record vote for parties outside the 3 major parties, with UKIP, the London Green Party, independents and other minor parties winning a collective 25.4% of the vote, the highest since the creation of the London Boroughs in 1964. 63 minor party or independent councillors were elected in total.

UKIP and the Greens saw their best-ever results in terms of vote share (9.8% for the Greens and 9.5% for UKIP), but whilst UKIP gained 12 seats, the Greens gained just 2.

Following the elections, two of the thirty two London borough councils were in no overall control, a decrease of one. All four mayoral elections returned the incumbent mayors: 3 Labour and 1 Tower Hamlets First.

== Results summary ==
Party	Votes won	% votes	Change	Seats	% seats	Change	Councils	Change
Labour	944,967	37.6	▲5.1	1,060	57.3	▲185	20	▲3
Conservative	663,847	26.4	▼5.3	612	33.1	▼105	9	▼2
Liberal Democrats	267,769	10.6	▼11.8	116	6.3	▼130	1	▼1
Green	246,805	9.8	▲3.2	4	0.2	▲2	0	Steady
UKIP	239,001	9.5	▲8.4	12	0.6	▲12	0	Steady
Others	152,684	6.1	▲0.4	47	2.5	▲26	0	Steady
No overall control	—N/a						2	▼6

- Turnout: 2,284,882 voters cast ballots, a turnout of 38.9% (−23.1%).

== Councils results ==
Council	Overall result		Cons.	Lab.	Lib. Dem.	UKIP	Green	Others	Turnout	Council election
Council	2010	2014	Cons.	Lab.	Lib. Dem.	UKIP	Green	Others	Turnout	Council election
Barking and Dagenham	Labour	Labour		51					38.16%	Details
Barnet	Conservative	Conservative	32	30	1				41.10%	Details
Bexley	Conservative	Conservative	45	15		3				Details
Brent	Labour	Labour	6	56	1				33.00%	Details
Bromley	Conservative	Conservative	51	7		2				Details
Camden	Labour	Labour	12	40	1		1		38.69%	Details
Croydon	Conservative	Labour	30	40					38.00%	Details
Ealing	Labour	Labour	12	53	4				41.30%	Details
Enfield	Labour	Labour	22	41					37.79%	Details
Greenwich	Labour	Labour	8	43					37.25%	Details
Hackney	Labour	Labour	4	50	3				42.89%	Details
Hammersmith and Fulham	Conservative	Labour	20	26					38.00%	Details
Haringey	Labour	Labour		48	9				38.10%	Details
Harrow	No overall control	Labour	26	34	1			2 (Note: Harrow: Independent, 2;)	41.00%	Details
Havering	Conservative	No overall control	22	1		7		24 (Note: Havering: Havering Residents Association, 19; Independent Residents, 5;)		Details
Hillingdon	Conservative	Conservative	42	23					35.76%	Details
Hounslow	Labour	Labour	11	49					36.80%	Details
Islington	Labour	Labour		47			1		38.40%	Details
Kensington and Chelsea	Conservative	Conservative	37	12	1					Details
Kingston upon Thames	Liberal Democrats	Conservative	28	2	18					Details
Lambeth	Labour	Labour	3	59			1		32.00%	Details
Lewisham	Labour	Labour		53			1			Details
Merton	No overall control	Labour	20	36	1			3 (Note: Merton: Merton Park Ward Independent Residents, 3;)	41.00%	Details
Newham	Labour	Labour		60					40.62%	Details
Redbridge	No overall control	Labour	25	35	3				39.70%	Details
Richmond upon Thames	Conservative	Conservative	39		15				46.30%	Details
Southwark	Labour	Labour	2	48	13					Details
Sutton	Liberal Democrats	Liberal Democrats	9		45				42.20%	Details
Tower Hamlets	Labour	No overall control	5	22				18 (Note: Tower Hamlets: Tower Hamlets First, 18;)		Details
Waltham Forest	Labour	Labour	16	44					59.22%	Details
Wandsworth	Conservative	Conservative	41	19						Details
Westminster	Conservative	Conservative	44	16					32.35%	Details
Totals			612	1,060	116	12	4	47		

== Overall councillors by party ==
Overall councillors by party
Party	Seats	Gain/loss
Labour	1,060	+185
Conservative	612	−105
Liberal Democrats	116	−130
Havering Residents Association	19	+7
Tower Hamlets First	18	+18
UKIP	12	+12
Independent Residents	5	+1
Green	4	+2
Merton Park RA	3	0
Independent	2	+1

Three seats in Barnet (Colindale) and three in Tower Hamlets (Blackwall and Cubitt Town) were vacancies until elections held on 26 June 2014 in Colindale and on 3 July 2014 in Blackwall and Cubitt Town.

== Opinion polling ==
Date(s) conducted	Polling organisation/client	Sample size	Lab	Con	Lib Dem	Grn	UKIP	Others	Lead
22 May 2014	2014 elections	2,515,073	37.6%	26.4%	10.6%	9.8%	9.5%	6.1%	11.2%
6–8 May 2014	YouGov	1,422	40%	33%	11%	2%	10%	4%	7%
28–29 April 2014	Survation	1,001	42%	26%	14%	4%	11%	3%	16%
6 May 2010	2010 elections	3,733,289	32.5%	31.7%	22.4%	6.6%	1.1%	5.7%	0.8%

== Mayoral results ==
In four London boroughs the executive function of the council is a directly elected mayor. The mayoral elections take place at the same time as councillor elections in those boroughs.

Mayoralty	2010	2014
Hackney	Jules Pipe (Labour)	Jules Pipe (Labour)
Lewisham	Sir Steve Bullock (Labour)	Sir Steve Bullock (Labour)
Newham	Robin Wales (Labour)	Robin Wales (Labour)
Tower Hamlets	Lutfur Rahman (Independent)	Lutfur Rahman (Tower Hamlets First)

== Ward result maps ==
=== London-wide ===
The map below shows the results for each ward across the whole of Greater London.

2014 London local elections results map

=== By borough ===
Barking and Dagenham 2014 results map

Barnet 2014 results map

Bexley 2014 results map

Brent 2014 results map

Bromley 2014 results map

Camden 2014 results map

Croydon 2014 results map

Ealing 2014 results map

Enfield 2014 results map

Greenwich 2014 results map

Hackney 2014 results map

Hammersmith and Fulham 2014 results map

Haringey 2014 results map

Harrow 2014 results map

Havering 2014 results map

Hillingdon 2014 results map

Hounslow 2014 results map

Islington 2014 results map

Kensington and Chelsea 2014 results map

Kingston upon Thames 2014 results map

Lambeth 2014 results map

Lewisham 2014 results map

Merton 2014 results map

Newham 2014 results map

Redbridge 2014 results map

Richmond upon Thames 2014 results map

Southwark 2014 results map

Sutton 2014 results map

Tower Hamlets 2014 results map

Waltham Forest 2014 results map

Wandsworth 2014 results map

Westminster 2014 results map
