= 2018 Hillingdon London Borough Council election =

2018 local election in England

← 2014	3 May 2018	2022 →

All 65 seats to Hillingdon London Borough Council 33 seats needed for a majority

	First party	Second party
Party	Conservative	Labour
Last election	42 seats, 45.1%	23 seats, 34.9%
Seats won	44	21
Seat change	▲2	▼2
Popular vote	116,359	82,520
Percentage	54.2%	38.5%
Swing	▲9.1%	▲3.6%
- Map of Hillingdon 2018 council election result
Council control before election
Conservative
Council control after election
Conservative

The 2018 Hillingdon Council election took place on 3 May 2018 to elect members of Hillingdon London Borough Council in England. This was on the same day as other local elections. The Conservative Party retained control with an increased majority.

== Overall result ==
The Conservatives retained control of the council, winning 44 seats (+2). Labour won 21 (−2). Tony Burles was the only incumbent councillor to lose his seat (Labour, Uxbridge South).

Hillingdon local election result 2018
Party	Seats	Gains	Losses	Net gain/loss	Seats %	Votes %	Votes	+/−
Conservative	44	3	1	+2	67.7	54.2	116,359	+9.1
Labour	21	1	3	−2	32.3	38.5	82,520	+3.6
Green	0	0	0	0	0.0	4.9	10,593	+1.2
Liberal Democrats	0	0	0	0	0.0	1.6	3,330	−2.4
Independent	0	0	0	0	0.0	0.5	1,101	−0.9
Duma Polska	0	0	0	0	0.0	0.1	454	New
Democrats and Veterans	0	0	0	0	0.0	0.1	153	New
BNP	0	0	0	0	0.0	0.1	143	−0.2

== Results by ward ==
=== Barnhill ===
Barnhill (3)
Party	Candidate	Votes	%	±%
Labour	Jas Dhot	2,334	72.1	+8.0
Labour	Anthony Eginton	2,027	62.6	+0.4
Labour	Kerri Prince	1,993	61.5	+2.1
Conservative	Cameron Bell	741	22.9	+4.2
Conservative	Jem Duducu	593	18.3	+1.3
Conservative	Rachel Xuereb	565	17.4	+1.0
Green	Rachel Moustafa	252	7.8	−1.6
Majority		1,252		
Turnout		3,239	35	
Labour hold		Swing		
Labour hold		Swing		
Labour hold		Swing		

=== Botwell ===
Botwell (3)
Party	Candidate	Votes	%	±%
Labour	Janet Gardner	2,486	68.2	+0.1
Labour	Scott Farley	2,404	66.0	+7.1
Labour	John Oswell	2,248	61.7	+4.1
Conservative	Isha Masson	941	25.8	+11.5
Conservative	Rachel Strong	908	24.9	+11.2
Conservative	Jack Cramp	874	24.0	+12.0
Green	Cat Mayne	242	6.6	−2.4
Duma Polska	Piotr Cimaszkiewicz	98	2.7	N/A
Majority		1,307		
Turnout		3,645	32	
Labour hold		Swing		
Labour hold		Swing		
Labour hold		Swing		

=== Brunel ===
Brunel (3)
Party	Candidate	Votes	%	±%
Conservative	Brian Stead	1,800	59.2	+14.1
Conservative	Richard Mills	1,740	57.2	+15.3
Conservative	Roy Chamdal	1,712	56.3	+18.2
Labour	John Bond	1,029	33.8	+4.1
Labour	Gillian Oswell	1,021	33.6	+6.5
Labour	Mohammed Islam	913	30.0	+3.3
Green	Beth Mackin	230	7.6	−5.1
Green	Huzaifa Essajee	143	4.7	N/A
Majority		683		
Turnout		3,041	36	
Conservative hold		Swing		
Conservative hold		Swing		
Conservative hold		Swing		

=== Cavendish ===
Cavendish (3)
Party	Candidate	Votes	%	±%
Conservative	Teji Barnes	2,761	70.5	+13.7
Conservative	Eddie Lavery	2,737	69.8	+11.2
Conservative	Heena Makwana	2,595	66.2	+7.7
Labour	Ian Campbell	818	20.9	+10.0
Labour	Lesley Major	681	17.4	−2.4
Labour	John Major	679	17.3	+5.5
Green	Richard Pye	362	9.2	+0.6
Green	Kay Lee	357	9.1	+2.9
Green	Alice Greenham	331	8.4	+5.2
Majority		1,777		
Turnout		3,919	44	
Conservative hold		Swing		
Conservative hold		Swing		
Conservative hold		Swing		

=== Charville ===
Charville (3)
Party	Candidate	Votes	%	±%
Conservative	Nicola Brightman	1,810	49.9	+13.8
Conservative	Neil Fyfe	1,773	48.9	+11.3
Conservative	Paula Rodrigues	1,713	47.2	+15.2
Labour	Annelise Roberts	1,690	46.6	+4.7
Labour	Steve Garelick	1,522	41.9	+5.4
Labour	Davey Williams	1,501	41.4	+7.4
Green	Andrew Gibbs	192	5.3	−4.9
Green	Jo Dexters	179	4.9	N/A
Majority		23		
Turnout		3,629	40	
Conservative hold		Swing		
Conservative gain from Labour		Swing		
Conservative gain from Labour		Swing		

=== Eastcote & East Ruislip ===
Eastcote & East Ruislip (3)
Party	Candidate	Votes	%	±%
Conservative	Nick Denys	3,519	74.8	+11.9
Conservative	Ian Edwards	3,442	73.2	+5.7
Conservative	Becky Haggar	3,387	72.0	+12.5
Labour	Fane Fonseka	595	12.7	−0.3
Labour	Nadir Mohammed	578	12.3	−0.4
Labour	Mary Turvey	577	12.3	−0.3
Green	Andy Blakie	386	8.2	−1.5
Liberal Democrats	Margaret Reap	326	6.9	−0.5
Green	Joseph Wyand	319	6.8	N/A
Liberal Democrats	Johnathan Banks	279	5.9	−1.1
Green	Balazs Dukat	245	5.2	N/A
Majority		2,792		
Turnout		4,702	47	
Conservative hold		Swing		
Conservative hold		Swing		
Conservative hold		Swing		

=== Harefield ===
Harefield (2)
Party	Candidate	Votes	%	±%
Conservative	Jane Palmer	1,396	61.3	+24.0
Conservative	Henry Higgins	1,125	49.4	+9.2
Independent	Richard Barnes	483	21.2	+0.6
Green	Sarah Green	425	18.7	+10.5
Green	Niki Samuel	394	17.3	N/A
Labour	David Miller-Holland	308	13.5	+4.0
Labour	Nas Issa	249	10.9	+4.8
Majority		642		
Turnout		2,276	40	
Conservative hold		Swing		
Conservative hold		Swing		

=== Heathrow Villages ===
Heathrow Villages (3)
Party	Candidate	Votes	%	±%
Labour	Peter Money	1,517	52.8	+7.2
Labour	Ingrid Nelson	1,475	51.4	+9.0
Labour	Ali Milani	1,382	48.1	+5.6
Conservative	Christine Taylor	1,133	39.4	+9.3
Conservative	Samjiv Bisnauthsing	1,037	36.1	+6.1
Conservative	Rafael Kochaj	999	34.8	+12.1
Green	Bill Stephens	261	9.1	−0.3
Majority		249		
Turnout		2,872	34	
Labour hold		Swing		
Labour hold		Swing		
Labour hold		Swing		

=== Hillingdon East ===
Hillingdon East (3)
Party	Candidate	Votes	%	±%
Conservative	Wayne Bridges	2,200	60.2	+15.4
Conservative	Pat Jackson	2,053	56.2	+16.3
Conservative	Alan Chapman	2,052	56.1	+15.7
Labour	John Campbell	1,333	36.5	+7.9
Labour	Gavin Browning	1,314	35.9	+13.5
Labour	Lynda Nye	1,239	33.9	+12.0
Democrats and Veterans	Steve Gardner	153	4.2	N/A
Majority		719		
Turnout		3,656	40	
Conservative hold		Swing		
Conservative hold		Swing		
Conservative hold		Swing		

=== Ickenham ===
Ickenham (3)
Party	Candidate	Votes	%	±%
Conservative	Ray Puddifoot	2,827	76.3	+7.3
Conservative	John Hensley	2,550	68.8	+7.2
Conservative	David Simmonds	2,540	68.5	+11.9
Labour	Jacqueline Forwood	571	15.4	−1.1
Labour	Peter James	517	13.9	−0.9
Labour	Carl Howes	494	13.3	−0.3
Green	Kevin Clark	314	8.5	+0.1
Green	Maria Annibal	302	8.1	N/A
Green	Sofia Kazi	278	7.5	N/A
Liberal Democrats	Mike Cox	191	5.2	+1.0
Majority		1,969		
Turnout		3,707	45	
Conservative hold		Swing		
Conservative hold		Swing		
Conservative hold		Swing		

=== Manor ===
Manor (3)
Party	Candidate	Votes	%	±%
Conservative	Mike Markham	2,603	68.7	+12.0
Conservative	Susan O'Brien	2,593	68.5	+10.6
Conservative	Douglas Mills	2,576	68.0	+8.8
Labour	Paul Espley	781	20.6	+5.1
Labour	Norrette Moore	688	18.2	+3.5
Labour	David Thorp	583	15.4	+3.4
Green	Peter Crook	316	8.3	−1.1
Liberal Democrats	Melanie Winterbotham	287	7.6	+0.2
Green	Graham Lee	263	6.9	N/A
Green	Geoffrey Wilkinson	257	6.8	−1.9
Majority		1,795		
Turnout		3,787	43	
Conservative hold		Swing		
Conservative hold		Swing		
Conservative hold		Swing		

=== Northwood ===
Northwood (3)
Party	Candidate	Votes	%	±%
Conservative	Carol Melvin	2,285	69.5	+3.7
Conservative	Richard Lewis	2,272	69.1	+7.0
Conservative	Scott Seaman-Digby	2,131	64.9	+5.7
Labour	Linda Read	496	15.1	+2.4
Labour	Wendy Ridley	452	13.8	+1.6
Labour	Peter Ryerson	409	12.4	+0.9
Green	Michelle Barnes	313	9.5	N/A
Green	Fiona Holding	246	7.5	−7.4
Liberal Democrats	Lagle Heinla	231	7.0	−3.7
Liberal Democrats	Gautam Sabarwal	203	6.2	±0.0
Liberal Democrats	Fiona Cox	170	5.2	+0.4
Green	Nicole Crook	168	5.1	
Majority		1,635		
Turnout		3,286	40	
Conservative hold		Swing		
Conservative hold		Swing		
Conservative hold		Swing		

=== Northwood Hills ===
Northwood Hills (3)
Party	Candidate	Votes	%	±%
Conservative	Jonathan Bianco	2,056	60.3	+16.9
Conservative	Duncan Flynn	2,039	59.8	+27.0
Conservative	John Morgan	2,014	59.1	+20.2
Labour	Dee Stuart	701	20.6	+6.4
Labour	Shabbar Sachedina	662	19.4	+7.0
Labour	Kevin McDonald	636	18.7	+7.2
Independent	Andrew Retter	618	18.1	−9.0
Green	Andy Ross	435	12.8	+3.3
Liberal Democrats	Peter Dollimore	226	6.6	+1.9
Liberal Democrats	Humam Abdul-Motalib	203	6.0	+3.5
Majority		1,313		
Turnout		3,409	38	
Conservative hold		Swing		
Conservative hold		Swing		
Conservative hold		Swing		

=== Pinkwell ===
Pinkwell (3)
Party	Candidate	Votes	%	±%
Labour	Jazz Dhillon	2,388	71.7	+10.8
Labour	Kuldeep Lakhmana	2,283	68.6	+10.1
Labour	Johnny Morse	2,249	67.6	+14.3
Conservative	Phil Collins	731	22.0	+2.2
Conservative	Shahid Biseem	711	21.4	+2.2
Conservative	Resham Kotecha	595	17.9	+0.1
Majority		1,518		
Turnout		3,329	33	
Labour hold		Swing		
Labour hold		Swing		
Labour hold		Swing		

=== South Ruislip ===
South Ruislip (3)
Party	Candidate	Votes	%	±%
Conservative	Allan Kauffman	2,119	59.5	+13.7
Conservative	Steve Tuckwell	2,015	56.6	+13.1
Conservative	Vanessa Hurhangee	1,943	54.6	+15.6
Labour	James Clouting	1,207	33.9	+5.9
Labour	Elisa Money	1,019	28.6	+5.6
Labour	Imran Khursheed	965	27.1	+4.5
Green	Deborah Howes	300	8.4	−1.0
Liberal Democrats	Hazel Young	232	6.5	−0.6
Green	Nicky Crowther	179	5.0	N/A
Majority		736		
Turnout		3,561	39	
Conservative hold		Swing		
Conservative hold		Swing		
Conservative hold		Swing		

=== Townfield ===
Townfield (3)
Party	Candidate	Votes	%	±%
Labour	Linda Allen	2,512	70.5	+3.7
Labour	Peter Curling	2,247	63.0	+4.2
Labour	Raju Sansarpuri	2,214	62.1	+6.6
Conservative	Adam Bennett	826	23.2	+3.2
Conservative	Kelly Martin	782	21.9	+6.6
Conservative	Mustapha Sowe	688	19.3	+6.6
Green	Dean Langley	278	7.8	−0.9
Majority		1,408		
Turnout		3,564	35	
Labour hold		Swing		
Labour hold		Swing		
Labour hold		Swing		

=== Uxbridge North ===
Uxbridge North (3)
Party	Candidate	Votes	%	±%
Conservative	Martin Goddard	2,563	67.6	+11.0
Conservative	Ray Graham	2,415	63.7	+14.2
Conservative	David Yarrow	2,299	60.6	+14.2
Labour	Ann Mooney	936	24.7	+3.1
Labour	Andrew Smith	901	23.7	+2.9
Labour	Jane Smith	892	23.5	+4.6
Green	William Holyday	312	8.2	−3.4
Green	Niall Murphy	275	7.2	N/A
Green	Siva Sivaramalingam	246	6.5	N/A
Majority		1,363		
Turnout		3,794	38	
Conservative hold		Swing		
Conservative hold		Swing		
Conservative hold		Swing		

=== Uxbridge South ===
Uxbridge South (3)
Party	Candidate	Votes	%	±%
Conservative	Judith Cooper	1,770	52.6	+12.9
Conservative	Keith Burrows	1,756	52.2	+10.5
Conservative	Farhad Choubedar	1,511	44.9	+14.2
Labour	Jessica Beishon	1,358	40.4	+8.2
Labour	Tony Burles	1,300	38.7	+4.3
Labour	Naz Shah	1,129	33.6	+7.2
Green	Chris West	306	9.1	−6.5
Green	John Bowman	263	7.8	N/A
Green	Mark Keir	212	6.3	N/A
Majority		153		
Turnout		3,362	40	
Conservative hold		Swing		
Conservative hold		Swing		
Conservative gain from Labour		Swing		

=== West Drayton ===
West Drayton (3)
Party	Candidate	Votes	%	±%
Labour	Janet Duncan	2,013	50.1	+12.7
Labour	Jan Sweeting	1,923	47.9	+10.7
Labour	Stuart Mathers	1,843	45.9	+12.9
Conservative	Cameron Bradbury	1,749	43.5	+3.8
Conservative	Lesley Deville	1,739	43.3	+10.6
Conservative	James Hamblin	1,737	43.2	+16.4
BNP	Vincent Evans	143	3.6	N/A
Duma Polska	Sebastien Tyszlewicz	117	2.9	N/A
Duma Polska	Remigiusz Jaskiewicz	95	2.4	N/A
Majority		94		
Turnout		4,018	36	
Labour hold		Swing		
Labour hold		Swing		
Labour gain from Conservative		Swing		

=== West Ruislip ===
West Ruislip (3)
Party	Candidate	Votes	%	±%
Conservative	Phillip Corthorne	2,622	70.4	+7.4
Conservative	John Riley	2,536	68.1	+8.7
Conservative	Devi Radia	2,274	61.1	+2.1
Labour	Margaret McDonald	699	18.8	+1.9
Labour	Pete McDonald	605	16.3	+1.9
Labour	Craig Whitehead	593	15.9	+2.4
Liberal Democrats	Christine Hooper	350	9.4	+3.0
Green	Shivalee Patel	337	9.1	−3.6
Liberal Democrats	Alexander Cunliffe	313	8.4	+2.4
Liberal Democrats	Kishan Devani	290	7.8	+2.2
Majority		1,575		
Turnout		3,723	41	
Conservative hold		Swing		
Conservative hold		Swing		
Conservative hold		Swing		

=== Yeading ===
Yeading (3)
Party	Candidate	Votes	%	±%
Labour	Lindsay Bliss	2,389	73.3	+23.8
Labour	Mohinder Singh Birah	2,280	70.0	+7.1
Labour	Jagjit Singh	2,206	67.7	+8.2
Conservative	Kelly Bridges	767	23.5	−0.1
Conservative	Christopher Smallwood	699	21.5	−0.3
Conservative	Bolupe Omisore	600	18.4	−1.3
Majority		1,439		
Turnout		3,257	35	
Labour hold		Swing		
Labour hold		Swing		
Labour hold		Swing		

=== Yiewsley ===
Yiewsley (3)
Party	Candidate	Votes	%	±%
Conservative	Shehryar Ahmad-Wallana	1,713	51.2	+21.2
Conservative	Alan Deville	1,588	47.5	+11.3
Conservative	Simon Arnold	1,539	46.0	+10.8
Labour	Cayla Martin	1,210	36.2	+5.2
Labour	Navjit Rana	1,192	35.6	+5.9
Labour	Robert Nunn	1,084	32.4	+3.8
Green	Jai Virdee	235	7.0	−3.3
Green	David Stephens	231	6.9	N/A
Green	Jordan Harris	203	6.1	N/A
Majority		329		
Turnout		3,346	36	
Conservative hold		Swing		
Conservative hold		Swing		
Conservative hold		Swing		

== By-elections ==
Hillingdon East by-election, 27 February 2020 (1)
Party	Candidate	Votes	%	±%
Conservative	Colleen Sullivan	1,430	68.8	
Labour	Annelise Roberts	488	23.5	
Liberal Democrats	Chris Hooper	86	4.1	
Green	Mark Keir	59	2.8	
UKIP	Geoffrey Courtenay	16	0.8	
Majority		942	43.3	
Turnout		2,082	22.0	
Conservative hold		Swing		

The by-election was caused by the resignation of Cllr Pat Jackson (Conservative) due to ill health.

Charville by-election, 6 May 2021 (1)
Party	Candidate	Votes	%	±%
Conservative	Darran Davies	2,098	49.6	
Labour	Stephen Garelick	1,799	42.5	
Green	John Bowman	164	3.9	
Liberal Democrats	Alexander Cunliffe	107	2.5	
Independent	Tiffany Rytter	61	1.4	
Majority		299	7.1	
Turnout		4,229	46.7	
Conservative hold		Swing		

The by-election was caused by the death of Cllr Neil Fyfe (Conservative).
