= 2014 Hillingdon London Borough Council election =

2014 local election in England

All 65 seats to Hillingdon London Borough Council 33 seats needed for a majority
	First party	Second party
Party	Conservative	Labour
Last election	46 seats	19 seats
Seats won	42	23
Seat change	▼4	▲4
- Map showing the results of the 2014 council election. Conservatives in blue and Labour in red.

The 2014 Hillingdon Borough Council election took place on 22 May 2014. All 65 members of Hillingdon London Borough Council were elected. The election took place alongside elections in the other London boroughs, elections to local authorities across the United Kingdom and an election to the European Parliament.

The Conservative Party retained control winning 42 seats. Labour won 23 seats.

== Results summary ==
2014 Hillingdon London Borough Council election
Party	Candidates	Seats	Gains	Losses	Net gain/loss	Seats %	Votes %	Votes	+/−
Conservative	65	42	1	5	▼4	64.6	36.3	32,555	
Labour	65	23	5	1	▲4	35.4	28.2	25,287	
UKIP	24	0	0	0	0	0.0	17.9	16,059	
Green	22	0	0	0	0	0.0	7.4	6,668	
Liberal Democrats	41	0	0	0	0	0.0	3.7	3,302	
TUSC	17	0	0	0	0	0.0	2.5	2,260	
Independent	6	0	0	0	0	0.0	2.1	1,877	
Northwood Hills Community Champions	3	0	0	0	0	0.0	0.9	847	
BNP	2	0	0	0	0	0.0	0.6	527	
National Front	1	0	0	0	0	0.0	198	0.2	

== Results by ward ==
Barnhill (3 seats)
Party	Candidate	Votes	%	±%
Labour	Kanwal Dheer	2,106	64.1	
Labour	Tony Eginton	2,042	62.2	
Labour	Jasjot Singh	1,951	59.4	
Conservative	Gordon Fewkes	613	18.7	
Conservative	Sarwan Singh Heer	560	17.0	
Conservative	Paul O'Connor	539	16.4	
UKIP	Paul Symons	529	16.1	
Green	John Purdom	308	9.4	
TUSC	Anthony McGill	108	3.3	
Turnout		3,285	34.1	
Labour hold		Swing		
Labour hold		Swing		
Labour hold		Swing		

Botwell (3 seats)
Party	Candidate	Votes	%	±%
Labour	Janet Gardner	2,532	68.1	
Labour	Mo Khursheed	2,192	58.9	
Labour	Phoday Jarjussey	2,142	57.6	
UKIP	Paul Austin	757	20.4	
Conservative	Caitlin Boydon-Jones	531	14.3	
Conservative	Cam McKirdy	510	13.7	
Conservative	Chris Smallwood	445	12.0	
Green	Geoff Smith	335	9.0	
TUSC	Jason Buck	167	4.5	
Turnout		3,719	32.1	
Labour hold		Swing		
Labour hold		Swing		
Labour hold		Swing		

Brunel (3 seats)
Party	Candidate	Votes	%	±%
Conservative	Brian Stead	1,332	45.1	
Conservative	Richard Mills	1,239	41.9	
Conservative	Roy Chamdal	1,124	38.1	
Labour	Peter Ryerson	878	29.7	
Labour	Jagjit Kaur Brar	800	27.1	
Labour	Laween Atroshi	790	26.7	
UKIP	Geoff Courtenay	755	25.6	
Green	Ben Martin	376	12.7	
Liberal Democrats	Barry Penny	162	5.5	
TUSC	Timothy Aviss	145	4.9	
Liberal Democrats	Bhavinchandra Purohit	63	2.1	
Liberal Democrats	Hetal Purohit	42	1.4	
Turnout		2,954	29.4	
Conservative hold		Swing		
Conservative hold		Swing		
Conservative hold		Swing		

Cavendish (3 seats)
Party	Candidate	Votes	%	±%
Conservative	Eddie Lavery	2,175	58.6	
Conservative	Michael White	2,168	58.5	
Conservative	Teji Barnes	2,108	56.8	
UKIP	Mark Osborne	792	21.4	
Labour	Lesley Major	734	19.8	
Labour	John Major	439	11.8	
Labour	Sarah Oliver	405	10.9	
Green	Graham Lee	320	8.6	
Liberal Democrats	Alison Marshall	231	6.2	
Green	Susan Murray	230	6.2	
Liberal Democrats	Susan Barrand	193	5.2	
Liberal Democrats	Michael Fisher	160	4.3	
Green	Aldo Mussi	117	3.2	
TUSC	Paul Jackson	102	2.8	
Turnout		3,709	40.8	
Conservative hold		Swing		
Conservative hold		Swing		
Conservative hold		Swing		

Charville (3 seats)
Party	Candidate	Votes	%	±%
Labour	Beulah East	1,572	41.9	
Conservative	Neil Fyfe	1,409	37.6	
Labour	David Horne	1,368	36.5	
Conservative	Mary O'Connor	1,354	36.1	
Labour	Mustapha Sowe	1,276	34.0	
Conservative	Farhad Choubedar	1,201	32.0	
UKIP	Cliff Dixon	1,004	26.8	
Green	Andrew Gibbs	381	10.2	
TUSC	Julia Leonard	132	3.5	
Turnout		3,749	40.2	
Labour hold		Swing		
Conservative hold		Swing		
Labour gain from Conservative		Swing		

Eastcote and East Ruislip (3 seats)
Party	Candidate	Votes	%	±%
Conservative	Catherine Dann	2,980	67.5	
Conservative	Nick Denys	2,778	62.9	
Conservative	Becky Haggar	2,628	59.5	
UKIP	Nick Bergman	813	18.4	
Labour	Trevor Richards	573	13.0	
Labour	Elana McIntyre	560	12.7	
Labour	Oliver Kinchen	557	12.6	
Green	Stephen Smith	429	9.7	
Liberal Democrats	Martin Chalk	326	7.4	
Liberal Democrats	Alan Graham	309	7.0	
Liberal Democrats	Leonard Toms	236	5.3	
TUSC	Dean Melvin	99	2.2	
Turnout		4,416	43.2	
Conservative hold		Swing		
Conservative hold		Swing		
Conservative hold		Swing		

Harefield (2 seats)
Party	Candidate	Votes	%	±%
Conservative	Henry Higgins	897	40.2	
Conservative	Jane Palmer	833	37.3	
UKIP	Gerard Barry	701	31.4	
Independent	Richard Barnes	460	20.6	
Independent	Atul Sodha	308	13.8	
Labour	Philip Halsall	213	9.5	
National Front	Ian Edward	198	8.9	
Green	Joshua Gould	184	8.2	
Labour	Douglas New	136	6.1	
Liberal Democrats	Andrew Clark	98	4.4	
Liberal Democrats	Alexander Cunliffe	47	2.1	
TUSC	James Carson	30	1.3	
Turnout		2,233	38.2	
Conservative hold		Swing		
Conservative hold		Swing		

Heathrow Villages (3 seats)
Party	Candidate	Votes	%	±%
Labour	Peter Money	1,270	45.6	
Labour	Manjit Kaur Khatra	1,183	42.5	
Labour	June Nelson	1,180	42.4	
Conservative	Alan Deville	839	30.1	
Conservative	Simon Arnold	836	30.0	
UKIP	Christine Taylor	707	25.4	
UKIP	Bryan Tomlinson	651	23.4	
Conservative	Heena Makwana	633	22.7	
Green	William Rigby	263	9.4	
Turnout		2,785	32.1	
Labour hold		Swing		
Labour gain from Conservative		Swing		
Labour gain from Conservative		Swing		

Hillingdon East (3 seats)
Party	Candidate	Votes	%	±%
Conservative	Wayne Bridges	1,572	44.8	
Conservative	Alan Chapman	1,418	40.4	
Conservative	Patricia Jackson	1,400	39.9	
Labour	John Campbell	1,005	28.6	
Labour	Raheela Malik	786	22.4	
Labour	Terry Morgan	769	21.9	
UKIP	Geraldine Shelvey	763	21.7	
Liberal Democrats	Mike Cox	507	14.4	
Liberal Democrats	Josh Dixon	448	12.8	
Liberal Democrats	Martin Clark	445	12.7	
TUSC	Derek Marsdon	106	3.0	
Turnout		3,509	37.3	
Conservative hold		Swing		
Conservative hold		Swing		
Conservative hold		Swing		

Ickenham (3 seats)
Party	Candidate	Votes	%	±%
Conservative	Raymond Puddifoot	2,519	69.0	
Conservative	John Hensley	2,250	61.6	
Conservative	David Simmonds	2,069	56.6	
UKIP	Stephen Darke	694	19.0	
Labour	John Buckingham	603	16.5	
Labour	Kevin Fox	542	14.8	
Labour	Liam Hagan	496	13.6	
Green	Robin Kinrade	306	8.4	
Liberal Democrats	Melanie Winterbotham	155	4.2	
Liberal Democrats	Diana Wingrove-Owens	132	3.6	
Liberal Democrats	Kim Mathen	116	3.2	
Turnout		3,653	44.2	
Conservative hold		Swing		
Conservative hold		Swing		
Conservative hold		Swing		

Manor (3 seats)
Party	Candidate	Votes	%	±%
Conservative	Douglas Mills	2,221	59.2	
Conservative	Susan O'Brien	2,174	57.9	
Conservative	Michael Markham	2,128	56.7	
UKIP	Paul McEntee	755	20.1	
Labour	Paul Espley	582	15.5	
Labour	Anne O'Shea	550	14.7	
Labour	Shashi Mathur	451	12.0	
Green	Peter Crook	353	9.4	
Green	Geoffrey Wilkinson	327	8.7	
Liberal Democrats	Albert Cox	277	7.4	
Liberal Democrats	Christopher Thomas	211	5.6	
Liberal Democrats	Antonio Salvani	199	5.3	
TUSC	Brian Jones	98	2.6	
Turnout		3,754	42.0	
Conservative hold		Swing		
Conservative hold		Swing		
Conservative hold		Swing		

Northwood (3 seats)
Party	Candidate	Votes	%	±%
Conservative	Carol Melvin	2,107	65.8	
Conservative	Richard Lewis	1,988	62.1	
Conservative	Scott Seaman-Digby	1,896	59.2	
Green	Fiona Holding	476	14.9	
UKIP	William Haines	434	13.6	
Labour	Aidan Bell	406	12.7	
Labour	Mahan Singh Dhillon	392	12.2	
Labour	Kim Widgington	368	11.5	
Liberal Democrats	Jeremy Asquith	341	10.7	
Liberal Democrats	Emily Mason	199	6.2	
Liberal Democrats	Geoffrey Jacobs	153	4.8	
Turnout		3,201	36.7	
Conservative hold		Swing		
Conservative hold		Swing		
Conservative hold		Swing		

Northwood Hills (3 seats)
Party	Candidate	Votes	%	±%
Conservative	Jonathan Bianco	1,559	43.4	
Conservative	John Morgan	1,399	38.9	
Conservative	Duncan Flynn	1,180	32.8	
Independent	Andrew Retter	976	27.1	
Northwood Hills Community Champions	David Bishop	847	23.6	
UKIP	Heidi Rao	567	15.8	
Labour	David Allam	509	14.2	
Labour	Jill Kinchen	445	12.4	
Northwood Hills Community Champions	Nilesh Dodhia	417	11.6	
Labour	Victoria Wallis	412	11.5	
TUSC	Wally Kennedy	364	10.1	
Green	Nicole Crook	342	9.5	
Northwood Hills Community Champions	Fawzi Kara-Isitt	230	6.4	
Liberal Democrats	Derek Honeygold	169	4.7	
Liberal Democrats	Alan Klein	89	2.5	
Liberal Democrats	Ulla Elizabet	78	2.2	
Turnout		3,596	38.7	
Conservative hold		Swing		
Conservative hold		Swing		
Conservative hold		Swing		

Pinkwell (3 seats)
Party	Candidate	Votes	%	±%
Labour	Jazz Dhillon	2,060	60.9	
Labour	Kuldeep Kaur Lakhmana	1,981	58.5	
Labour	John Morse	1,804	53.3	
Conservative	Kelly-Marie Bridges	670	19.8	
Conservative	Zara Albright	649	19.2	
UKIP	Stephen Knight	608	18.0	
Conservative	Tom Hardinge	604	17.8	
Green	Daniel Lee	306	9.0	
TUSC	Robert Diment	128	3.8	
Turnout		3,385	32.8	
Labour hold		Swing		
Labour hold		Swing		
Labour hold		Swing		

South Ruislip (3 seats)
Party	Candidate	Votes	%	±%
Conservative	Allan Kauffman	1,451	45.8	
Conservative	Judy Kelly	1,378	43.5	
Conservative	Jem Duducu	1,237	39.0	
Labour	Robert Nunn	888	28.0	
Labour	Arran Griffiths	729	23.0	
Labour	Robert Pennington	716	22.6	
UKIP	Martin Shelvey	651	20.5	
UKIP	Alan Foster	649	20.5	
Green	John Barrabel	299	9.4	
Liberal Democrats	Nicholas Watts	226	7.1	
BNP	Gavin Cardy	223	7.0	
Liberal Democrats	Peter Dollimore	165	5.2	
Liberal Democrats	Mike Swallow	144	4.5	
TUSC	Daniel Hayes	52	1.6	
Turnout		3,170	34.7	
Conservative hold		Swing		
Conservative hold		Swing		
Conservative hold		Swing		

Townfield (3 seats)
Party	Candidate	Votes	%	±%
Labour	Lynne Allen	2,374	66.8	
Labour	Peter Curling	2,090	58.8	
Labour	Robin Sansarpuri	1,971	55.5	
UKIP	Bernard Fagan	750	21.1	
Conservative	Nicola Brightman	709	20.0	
Conservative	Harry MacManus	545	15.3	
Conservative	Sam Rogerson	452	12.7	
Green	William Linton	309	8.7	
TUSC	Maddie Hayes	151	4.2	
Turnout		3,553	33.8	
Labour hold		Swing		
Labour hold		Swing		
Labour hold		Swing		

Uxbridge North (3 seats)
Party	Candidate	Votes	%	±%
Conservative	George Cooper	2,047	56.6	
Conservative	Raymond Graham	1,788	49.5	
Conservative	David Yarrow	1,678	46.4	
UKIP	Nicola Weisenberger	807	22.3	
Labour	Paul Harmsworth	781	21.6	
Labour	Norrette Moore	753	20.8	
Labour	Alex Mitchell	683	18.9	
Green	William Holyday	419	11.6	
Liberal Democrats	Nasim Khan	184	5.1	
Liberal Democrats	Adam Masters	180	5.0	
Liberal Democrats	Margaret Reap	164	4.5	
TUSC	Zahra Asif	120	3.3	
Turnout		3,615	36.3	
Conservative hold		Swing		
Conservative hold		Swing		
Conservative hold		Swing		

Uxbridge South (3 seats)
Party	Candidate	Votes	%	±%
Conservative	Keith Burrows	1,332	41.7	
Conservative	Judith Cooper	1,269	39.7	
Labour	Tony Burles	1,099	34.4	
Labour	Kerri Prince	1,028	32.2	
Conservative	George Pittaway	980	30.7	
Labour	Imran Khursheed	845	26.4	
UKIP	Jack Duffin	752	23.5	
Green	Samuel Buck	500	15.6	
Liberal Democrats	Fiona Cox	243	7.6	
TUSC	Gary Harbord	189	5.9	
Liberal Democrats	Paul McKeown	118	3.7	
Liberal Democrats	Saghaer Mallick	112	3.5	
Turnout		3,195	31.2	
Conservative hold		Swing		
Conservative hold		Swing		
Labour gain from Conservative		Swing		

West Drayton (3 seats)
Party	Candidate	Votes	%	±%
Conservative	Dominic Gilham	1,494	39.7	
Labour	Janet Duncan	1,406	37.4	
Labour	Jan Sweeting	1,397	37.2	
Labour	John Bond	1,240	33.0	
Conservative	Barry Hartness	1,228	32.7	
Conservative	Naman Purewal	1,006	26.8	
UKIP	Raymond Peverill	974	25.9	
Independent	Ann Banks	441	11.7	
Independent	Nicky Murphy	286	7.6	
Independent	Paul Buttivant	246	6.5	
TUSC	Carlos Barros	151	4.0	
Turnout		3,759	34.0	
Conservative hold		Swing		
Labour hold		Swing		
Labour gain from Conservative		Swing		

West Ruislip (3 seats)
Party	Candidate	Votes	%	±%
Conservative	Philip Corthorne	2,122	63.0	
Conservative	John Riley	2,002	59.4	
Conservative	Brian Crowe	1,989	59.0	
UKIP	Phil Basey	755	22.4	
Labour	Margaret McDonald	568	16.9	
Labour	Peter McDonald	485	14.4	
Labour	Mary Turvey	454	13.5	
Green	Vincent Cowan-Bates	428	12.7	
Liberal Democrats	Hilary Leighter	215	6.4	
Liberal Democrats	Carolyn Towner	202	6.0	
Liberal Democrats	Graydon Rodwell	189	5.6	
Turnout		3,370	37.4	
Conservative hold		Swing		
Conservative hold		Swing		
Conservative hold		Swing		

Yeading (3 seats)
Party	Candidate	Votes	%	±%
Labour	Mohinder Singh Birah	2,121	62.9	
Labour	Jagjit Singh	2,006	59.5	
Labour	Narinder Garg	2,004	59.5	
Conservative	Arthur Preston	794	23.6	
Conservative	Graham Horn	735	21.8	
Conservative	Cheryl Shaughnessy	665	19.7	
UKIP	Helen Knight	599	17.8	
Turnout		3,370	34.9	
Labour hold		Swing		
Labour hold		Swing		
Labour hold		Swing		

Yiewsley (3 seats)
Party	Candidate	Votes	%	±%
Conservative	Peter Davis	1,182	36.4	
Conservative	Ian Edwards	1,143	35.2	
Conservative	Shehryar Wallana	1,009	31.04	
Labour	Lindsay Bliss	1,007	30.98	
Labour	Parminder Kaur	964	29.7	
Labour	John Oswell	930	28.6	
UKIP	Jason Pontey	892	27.4	
Green	Graham Brownsword	334	10.3	
BNP	Vincent Evans	304	9.4	
Liberal Democrats	Eileen Holland	168	5.2	
Liberal Democrats	Humam Abdul-Motalib	142	4.4	
TUSC	Linda Martin	118	3.6	
Liberal Democrats	Alan Masters	113	3.5	
Turnout		3,251	33.8	
Conservative hold		Swing		
Conservative hold		Swing		
Conservative gain from Labour		Swing		
