= Shafaqna =

News agency

Shafaqna (Persian: شفقنا; International Shia News Association or Shia News Agency) is a news agency specializing in news related to Shia Muslim communities. Its reports are cited by media organizations and Shia-oriented news websites in Shia-majority countries and beyond. It focuses on news relating to Shia Islam. It started its activities on Friday, February 24, 2012. It is an independent medium implemented in English, French, Spanish, Persian, Arabic, Turkish, Urdu, Azerbaijani and Russian. Material in Arabic is produced out of Najaf, Iraq, Persian from Tehran, Iran, Turkish from Istanbul, Turkey. Shafaqna has also launched independent pages in Pakistan, India, Lebanon, Iraq and Afghanistan.

Shafaqna says it covers most Islamic and specifically Shia events and activities across the world, to inaugurate dialogues between Shia Islam and other faiths and religions in a peacebuilding manner.

Shafaqna is closely connected to the Ayatollah Ali al-Sistani , the highest ranking Shia jurist in Iraq, and has published several articles about his doctrine. Shafaqna also publishes Sistani's fatwas frequently. It has ties to the Najaf seminary and exclusive news of Sistani. Following the meeting between Pope Francis and Ali al-Sistani in Najaf on 6 March 2021, Shafaqna's coverage of the visit was widely cited by international media outlets.

In June 2014, Shafaqna launched Lnews (Latest World News by Country), a news aggregation service featuring content from international, regional, and national news agencies. The platform covered news from more than 100 countries. It was subsequently transformed into the World News Agency Directory, which provides links to national news agencies categorized by country.

== Shafaqna English’s AI & HI adoption ==
On March 29, 2024, Shafaqna English announced a content creation strategy that combines Artificial Intelligence (AI) and Human Intelligence (HI). Under this approach, AI is used to generate initial drafts in response to selected prompts, after which the content is reviewed, edited, and proofread by the platform's editorial team. According to Shafaqna, the strategy is intended to expand content production while maintaining transparency regarding the use of AI in journalism. The organization states that its use of AI and HI in content creation is guided by ethical and journalistic standards.
