= 2018 Greenwich London Borough Council election =

2018 local election in England

2018 Greenwich Borough Council election
- 3 May 2018

All 51 seats to Greenwich London Borough Council 26 seats needed for a majority

	First party	Second party
Leader	Denise Hyland	Matt Hartley
Party	Labour	Conservative
Last election	43 seats, 54.4%	8 seats, 23.5%
Seats won	42	9
Seat change	▼1	▲1
Popular vote	105,468	44,489
Percentage	55.9%	23.6%
Swing	▲1.5%	▲0.1%
- Map of the results of the 2018 Greenwich council election. Conservatives in blue and Labour in red.
Council control before election
Labour
Council control after election
Labour

The 2018 Greenwich London Borough Council election took place on 3 May 2018 to elect members of Greenwich London Borough Council in England. This was on the same day as other local elections.

== Results summary ==
Greenwich Council election result 2018
Party	Seats	Gains	Losses	Net gain/loss	Seats %	Votes %	Votes	+/−
Labour	42	0	1	-1	82.4	55.9	105,468	+1.5
Conservative	9	1	0	+1	17.6	23.6	44,489	+0.1
Liberal Democrats	0	0	0	0	0.0	8.6	16,307	+2.3
Green	0	0	0	0	0.0	7.7	14,491	+0.8
The Plumstead Party	0	0	0	0	0.0	2.5	4,737	New
Independent	0	0	0	0	0.0	0.7	1,386	-0.3
Women's Equality	0	0	0	0	0.0	0.3	652	New
UKIP	0	0	0	0	0.0	0.3	615	-6.2
Renew	0	0	0	0	0.0	0.1	221	New
BNP	0	0	0	0	0.0	0.1	123	-0.8
Monster Raving Loony	0	0	0	0	0.0	0.1	106	New
Democrats and Veterans	0	0	0	0	0.0	0.1	102	New
Duma Polska	0	0	0	0	0.0	0.0	50	New

== Ward results ==
=== Abbey Wood ===
Abbey Wood
Party	Candidate	Votes	%	±%
Labour Co-op	Ann-Marie Cousins	2,213	65.4	+14.7
Labour Co-op	Denise Hyland	1,985	58.6	+0.9
Labour Co-op	Clive Mardner	1,980	58.5	+1.6
Independent	Bruce Jamieson	507	15.0	N/A
Independent	Craig Jenkins	476	14.1	N/A
Independent	Ronie Johnson	403	11.9	N/A
Conservative	David Burrows	399	11.8	−0.4
Conservative	Roland Hogg	313	9.2	−1.7
Conservative	Janet Martin	304	9.0	+0.3
Liberal Democrats	Gareth Clayfield	231	6.8	±0.0
Green	Arthur Hayles	227	6.7	−6.9
Liberal Democrats	Tom Headon	192	5.7	−1.2
Liberal Democrats	Bonnie Soanes	186	5.5	+0.8
Turnout			31.44	
Labour hold		Swing		
Labour hold		Swing		
Labour hold		Swing		

=== Blackheath Westcombe ===
Blackheath Westcombe
Party	Candidate	Votes	%	±%
Labour Co-op	Mariam Lolavar	2,036	43.4	−4.2
Labour Co-op	Leo Fletcher	1,861	39.7	−4.5
Conservative	Geoff Brighty	1,811	38.6	−0.6
Labour Co-op	Sabiha Shahzad	1,705	36.3	−1.3
Conservative	Thomas Turrell	1,482	31.6	−1.5
Conservative	Malcolm Reid	1,406	30.0	−1.8
Green	Fiona Moore	641	13.7	−10.2
Green	Jannet Mathers	627	13.4	N/A
Liberal Democrats	Suzanne Miller	550	11.7	+1.3
Liberal Democrats	Usha Badrinath	543	11.6	+1.6
Liberal Democrats	Franklin Steves	482	10.3	N/A
Green	Victoria Rance	429	9.1	N/A
Monster Raving Loony	Trevor Allman	106	2.3	N/A
Turnout			47.49	
Labour hold		Swing		
Labour hold		Swing		
Conservative hold		Swing		

=== Charlton ===
Charlton
Party	Candidate	Votes	%	±%
Labour Co-op	Gary Dillon	2,487	61.6	+3.7
Labour Co-op	Linda Perks	2,254	55.9	+0.1
Labour Co-op	Gary Parker	2,035	50.4	+0.5
Green	Clare Loops	834	20.7	−0.4
Women's Equality	Pamela Ritchie	652	16.2	N/A
Conservative	Macharia Gakuru	606	15.0	−0.6
Conservative	Catherine Latham	598	14.8	+1.7
Conservative	Maya Mann	595	14.7	+3.1
Liberal Democrats	Rebecca Ireland	457	11.3	+0.9
Liberal Democrats	Ian Gerrard	414	10.3	+1.9
Liberal Democrats	Charlie Rome	356	8.8	+3.7
Turnout			38.92	
Labour hold		Swing		
Labour hold		Swing		
Labour hold		Swing		

=== Coldharbour and New Eltham ===
Coldharbour and New Eltham
Party	Candidate	Votes	%	±%
Conservative	John Hills	1,985	50.1	+5.9
Conservative	Matt Hartley	1,886	47.6	+9.5
Conservative	Roger Tester	1,712	43.2	+1.6
Labour Co-op	Catherine Dowse	1,617	40.8	+12.5
Labour Co-op	Peter Baker	1,472	37.2	+9.0
Labour Co-op	Ivanhoe Norona	1,336	33.7	+7.9
Green	Philip Connolly	254	6.4	−3.7
Liberal Democrats	Emma Lewis	251	6.3	+1.7
Liberal Democrats	Martin Butcher	197	5.0	+1.0
Liberal Democrats	Paul Gentry	194	4.9	+1.7
UKIP	Peter Whittle	160	4.0	−24.9
BNP	Clifford Adams	123	3.1	−7.1
Turnout			39.96	
Conservative hold		Swing		
Conservative hold		Swing		
Conservative hold		Swing		

=== Eltham North ===
Eltham North
Party	Candidate	Votes	%	±%
Conservative	Charlie Davis	2,195	44.6	+7.3
Labour Co-op	Linda Bird	2,176	44.2	+4.4
Conservative	Spencer Drury	2,166	44.0	+3.6
Labour Co-op	Steve Offord	2,139	43.4	+3.7
Labour Co-op	Caroline Walsh	2,057	41.8	+10.0
Conservative	Brenda Lobo	1,947	39.5	+8.4
Green	Nuala McGreevy	406	8.2	−3.9
Liberal Democrats	Mary Green	323	6.6	+2.4
Liberal Democrats	Andrew Chamberlain	261	5.3	+1.1
Liberal Democrats	Michael O'Keefe	222	4.5	N/A
Democrats and Veterans	Earl Williamson	102	2.1	N/A
Turnout			49.86	
Conservative gain from Labour		Swing		
Labour hold		Swing		
Conservative hold		Swing		

=== Eltham South ===
Eltham South
Party	Candidate	Votes	%	±%
Conservative	Matt Clare	1,973	51.3	+12.9
Conservative	Nigel Fletcher	1,860	48.4	+12.6
Conservative	Pat Greenwell	1,838	47.8	+15.2
Labour	Tom Atley	1,459	37.9	+7.1
Labour	Susan Clinton	1,441	37.5	+9.5
Labour	Patricia Slattery	1,402	36.5	+13.4
Green	Helen Albrecht	354	9.2	−1.9
Liberal Democrats	Michael Lewis	243	6.3	+0.6
Liberal Democrats	Michael Chuter	214	5.6	−0.1
Liberal Democrats	Mark Pattenden	187	4.9	−0.1
Turnout			42.75	
Conservative hold		Swing		
Conservative hold		Swing		
Conservative hold		Swing		

=== Eltham West ===
Eltham West
Party	Candidate	Votes	%	±%
Labour Co-op	Bill Freeman	1,664	58.9	+7.2
Labour Co-op	Mick Hayes	1,635	57.9	+5.3
Labour Co-op	Miranda Williams	1,551	54.9	+9.3
Conservative	Jim Davis	706	25.0	+8.9
Conservative	Gemma Turrell	698	24.7	+8.7
Conservative	James Worron	620	21.9	+9.4
Green	Matthew Stratford	324	11.5	−1.9
Liberal Democrats	Eileen Cox	278	9.8	+4.2
Liberal Democrats	Alistair Mills	187	6.6	+1.4
Liberal Democrats	Matthew Huntbach	183	6.5	N/A
Turnout			30.60	
Labour Co-op hold		Swing		
Labour Co-op hold		Swing		
Labour Co-op hold		Swing		

=== Glyndon ===
Glyndon
Party	Candidate	Votes	%	±%
Labour Co-op	Tonia Ashikodi*	2,386	65.2	+1.4
Labour Co-op	Peter Brooks	2,316	63.3	+3.8
Labour Co-op	Adel Khaireh	2,077	56.7	−0.8
The Plumstead Party	Stewart Christie	574	15.7	N/A
The Plumstead Party	Ebru Ogun	475	13.0	N/A
Conservative	Jonathan Carter	458	12.5	−0.2
The Plumstead Party	Kevin Sweeney	458	12.5	N/A
Green	Leonie Barron	406	11.1	−5.3
Conservative	Sheila Stirling	364	9.9	−2.1
Conservative	Gillian Lee	353	9.6	−4.6
Liberal Democrats	Katharine Pons	169	4.6	−2.3
Liberal Democrats	Jack Fletcher	149	4.1	−0.2
Liberal Democrats	Richard Smith	132	3.6	−0.1
Turnout			32.61	
Labour Co-op hold		Swing		
Labour Co-op hold		Swing		
Labour Co-op hold		Swing		

- Resigned part way through term due to criminal conviction.

=== Greenwich West ===
Greenwich West
Party	Candidate	Votes	%	±%
Labour	Maureen O'Mara	2,643	49.8	−9.6
Labour	Mehboob Khan	2,635	49.7	−4.9
Labour	Aidan Smith	2,473	46.6	−1.5
Liberal Democrats	Rhian O'Connor	1,308	24.7	+12.3
Liberal Democrats	Anthony Austin	1,232	23.2	+12.1
Liberal Democrats	Edmond Rose	1,223	23.1	+13.3
Conservative	Jessica Goodrum	783	14.8	−7.0
Conservative	Gavin Haran	698	13.2	−7.0
Conservative	Christopher Swift	697	13.1	−5.3
Green	Robin Stott	608	11.5	−13.2
Green	Dee Thomas	582	11.0	N/A
Green	Isobel Whittaker	491	9.3	N/A
Turnout			37.68	
Labour hold		Swing		
Labour hold		Swing		
Labour hold		Swing		

=== Kidbrooke with Hornfair ===
Kidbrooke with Hornfair
Party	Candidate	Votes	%	±%
Labour Co-op	Norman Adams	2,024	59.5	+8.8
Labour Co-op	Christine Grice	1,976	58.1	+9.8
Labour Co-op	David Stanley	1,861	54.8	+12.0
Conservative	Graham Brinkhurst	838	24.7	+2.6
Conservative	Ralph Spencer	764	22.5	+1.8
Conservative	Kerrymarie West	713	21.0	+5.5
Green	Jan King	462	13.6	−3.3
Liberal Democrats	David Beaumont	344	10.1	+1.5
Liberal Democrats	Timothy Snowball	248	7.3	N/A
UKIP	Barbara Ray	234	6.9	−20.3
Liberal Democrats	Richard Mbogga	186	5.5	N/A
Turnout			32.71	
Labour Co-op hold		Swing		
Labour Co-op hold		Swing		
Labour Co-op hold		Swing		

=== Middle Park and Sutcliffe ===
Middle Park and Sutcliffe
Party	Candidate	Votes	%	±%
Labour Co-op	Ian Hawking	2,049	57.1	+15.2
Labour Co-op	Christine May	2,045	57.0	+12.9
Labour Co-op	Mark James	1,883	52.5	+9.7
Conservative	Kate Drury	850	23.7	−2.8
Conservative	Aileen Davis	842	23.5	+0.6
Conservative	James Shipp	772	21.5	+1.3
Liberal Democrats	Lee Coppack	402	11.2	+1.7
Liberal Democrats	Patricia Marshall	351	9.8	+0.9
Liberal Democrats	Christopher Smith	339	9.5	+2.4
Green	Syed Ali Tarek	327	9.1	−5.6
UKIP	Ray Adams	221	6.2	−17.4
Turnout			36.15	
Labour Co-op hold		Swing		
Labour Co-op hold		Swing		
Labour Co-op hold		Swing		

=== Peninsula ===
Peninsula
Party	Candidate	Votes	%	±%
Labour Co-op	Stephen Brain	2,470	47.0	−1.7
Labour Co-op	Chris Lloyd	2,274	43.2	+2.4
Labour Co-op	Denise Scott-McDonald	2,271	43.2	−1.6
Green	Matt Browne	1,808	34.4	+14.4
Green	Dan Garrun	1,587	30.3	+11.2
Green	Jenny Murphy	1,539	29.3	+13.9
Conservative	Ben Green	790	15.0	−3.9
Conservative	Antony Higginbotham	702	13.4	−5.1
Conservative	Reece Smith	664	12.6	−4.2
Liberal Democrats	Richard Chamberlain	396	7.5	±0.0
Liberal Democrats	Matthew Ferguson	379	7.2	+1.7
Liberal Democrats	Andrew Smith	334	6.4	+1.2
Majority				
Turnout			36.0	
Labour hold		Swing		
Labour hold		Swing		
Labour hold		Swing		

=== Plumstead ===
Plumstead
Party	Candidate	Votes	%	±%
Labour Co-op	Angela Cornforth	2,304	64.9	−2.8
Labour Co-op	Rajinder James	1,970	55.5	+4.2
Labour Co-op	Matt Morrow	1,916	54.0	−2.4
The Plumstead Party	Cheryl Levett	609	17.2	N/A
The Plumstead Party	Mervyn Fernandez	591	16.6	N/A
The Plumstead Party	Alison Miller	544	15.3	N/A
Conservative	Patricia Gillard	419	11.8	+0.1
Conservative	Felix Parker-Smith	386	10.9	−0.4
Conservative	Andreas Heiner	349	9.8	−0.5
Green	Paul Roberts	320	9.0	−5.5
Liberal Democrats	Dan Wallace	142	4.0	−5.3
Renew	Ese Adjekughele	122	3.4	N/A
Liberal Democrats	Mark Smith	122	3.4	N/A
Turnout			32.60	
Labour Co-op hold		Swing		
Labour Co-op hold		Swing		
Labour Co-op hold		Swing		

=== Shooters Hill ===
Shooters Hill
Party	Candidate	Votes	%	±%
Labour Co-op	Chris Kirby	2,359	58.3	+9.1
Labour Co-op	Sarah Merrill	2,340	57.9	+6.5
Labour Co-op	Danny Thorpe	2,218	54.9	+6.9
Conservative	Maureen Burgess	712	17.6	−3.2
Conservative	Steve Adamson	697	17.2	−0.1
Conservative	David Runham	591	14.6	+2.4
The Plumstead Party	Laura Conwell-Tillotson	572	14.1	N/A
Green	Ann Brown	491	12.1	−6.0
The Plumstead Party	John Nichols	465	11.5	N/A
The Plumstead Party	Stuart Lyons	449	11.1	N/A
Liberal Democrats	Heather Heiner	193	4.8	−5.1
Liberal Democrats	Richard Shiel	193	4.8	−2.0
Liberal Democrats	Jane Hermiston	174	4.3	−2.0
Turnout			41.33	
Labour Co-op hold		Swing		
Labour Co-op hold		Swing		
Labour Co-op hold		Swing		

=== Thamesmead Moorings ===
Thamesmead Moorings
Party	Candidate	Votes	%	±%
Labour Co-op	Olu Babatola	2,201	70.0	+6.2
Labour Co-op	Averil Lekau	2,057	65.4	+7.7
Labour Co-op	Sizwe James	1,989	63.2	+7.2
Conservative	Elaine Hayzen	500	15.9	−0.2
Conservative	Joe Robertson	496	15.8	+2.0
Conservative	John Wainwright	452	14.4	+4.8
Green	Claudine Letsae	282	9.0	−3.4
Liberal Democrats	Paul West	209	6.6	−3.3
Liberal Democrats	Claire Steves	159	5.1	N/A
Liberal Democrats	Anthony Durham	143	4.5	N/A
Turnout			26.32	
Labour Co-op hold		Swing		
Labour Co-op hold		Swing		
Labour Co-op hold		Swing		

=== Woolwich Common ===
Woolwich Common
Party	Candidate	Votes	%	±%
Labour Co-op	David Gardner	2,658	72.3	+2.4
Labour Co-op	Anthony Okereke	2,520	68.5	+1.1
Labour Co-op	Ivis Williams	2,491	67.7	+5.1
Green	Keith Crowhurst	490	13.3	−1.0
Conservative	Simon Gallie	460	12.5	+2.2
Conservative	Patricia Hills	444	12.1	+1.4
Conservative	Jan Wainwright	398	10.8	+2.6
Liberal Democrats	Matthew Rose	223	6.1	−1.2
Liberal Democrats	Matthew Glinsman	208	5.7	N/A
Liberal Democrats	Martin Simons	190	5.2	N/A
Renew	Ziaur Rahman	99	2.7	N/A
Turnout			32.79	
Labour Co-op hold		Swing		
Labour Co-op hold		Swing		
Labour Co-op hold		Swing		

=== Woolwich Riverside ===
Woolwich Riverside
Party	Candidate	Votes	%	±%
Labour Co-op	Jackie Smith	2,708	63.9	+7.0
Labour Co-op	John Fahy	2,706	63.9	+8.4
Labour Co-op	Dominic Mbang	2,585	61.0	−1.3
Conservative	Thomas Spiller	679	16.0	+0.3
Conservative	Tomas Thurogood-Hyde	558	13.2	±0.0
Conservative	Christopher Van Roon	543	12.8	+2.0
Green	Leonie Fleischmann	431	10.2	−6.5
Liberal Democrats	Kieran Bradley	393	9.3	+1.4
Green	Sam Heffernan	337	8.0	N/A
Green	Caolan Byrne	334	7.9	N/A
Liberal Democrats	Andrew Newton	329	7.8	+1.0
Liberal Democrats	Ramesh Perera-Delcourt	287	6.8	+2.3
Duma Polska	Mariusz Prystupa	50	1.2	N/A
Turnout			30.90	
Labour Co-op hold		Swing		
Labour Co-op hold		Swing		
Labour Co-op hold		Swing		

== 2018-2022 by-elections ==
Greenwich West by-election, 6 May 2021
Party	Candidate	Votes	%	±%
Labour	Pat Slattery	3,203	47.1	▼2.4
Conservative	Ben Crompton	1,228	18.1	▼3.4
Green	Matt Browne	1,135	16.7	▲5.3
Liberal Democrats	Rhian O'Connor	1,121	16.5	▼8.0
Monster Raving Loony	Trevor Allman	110	1.6	N/A
Turnout				
Labour hold		Swing		

Glyndon by-election, 6 May 2021
Party	Candidate	Votes	%	±%
Labour	Sandra Bauer	2,520	59.4	▲0.3
Conservative	Naveed Mughal	689	16.2	▲4.7
Green	Leonie Barron	546	12.9	▲2.7
Liberal Democrats	Stewart Christie	402	9.5	▲5.2
TUSC	Lizzy Hedderly	87	2.1	N/A
Turnout				
Labour hold		Swing		

Kidbrooke with Hornfair by-election, 6 May 2021
Party	Candidate	Votes	%	±%
Labour	Odette McGahey	1,928	42.3	▼9.5
Conservative	Andrea Borbely	1,519	33.4	▲11.9
Green	Carol O'Toole	621	13.6	▲1.8
Liberal Democrats	Pierce Chambers	261	5.7	▼3.1
Independent	Sharon Kent	225	4.9	N/A
Turnout				
Labour hold		Swing		
