= Taran (name) =

Taran is both a given name and surname, of different origins. It may be writing without diacritics the Romanian surname Țăran .Notable people with the name include:

== Given name ==
- Taran of the Picts, a 7th-century king of the Picts
- Taran Adarsh (born 1965), Indian film critic
- Taran Alvelo (born 1996), female American softball player
- Taran Armstrong (born 2002), Australian basketball player
- Taran Davies, American film producer and director
- Taran Killam (born 1982), American comic actor
- Taran King, former editor of Phrack
- Taran Kozun (born 1994), Canadian professional ice hockey player
- Taran Noah Smith (born 1984), former American child actor
- Taran Svami, founder of the Taran Panth religious sect

== Surname ==
- Alexander Taran (born 1951), Russian convict
- Alla Taran (1941–2017), Ukrainian violinist
- Andriy Taran (born 1955), Ukrainian lieutenant general
- Igor Taran (born 1986), Uzbekistani footballer
- Lidiya Taran (born 1977), Ukrainian television presenter
- Oleh Taran (born 1960), Ukrainian footballer
- Pavel Taran (1916–2005), Soviet-Ukrainian WWII pilot
- Ruslana Taran (born 1970), Ukrainian sailor
- Tetiana Taran (1946–2007), Soviet and Ukrainian computer scientist

== See also ==
- Taran (disambiguation)
