= Classical violin in Cuba =

The bowed string instruments have been always present in Cuba since its discovery, first as the viol or bowed vihuela and at a later time as the Italian violin. As other instruments and the culture in general, also the violin enjoyed in Cuba a period of great relevance during the 19th century. The violin was part of the instrumental ensembles that accompanied the Contradance and the Dance, the first Cuban musical genres, as well as other subsequent genres as the Danzón and the Cha cha cha. The violin also intoned some of the most beautiful melodies composed in Cuba, such as "La Bella Cubana" by José White. At all times, the Cuban violinists have been prominent representatives of the Cuban music throughout the entire world.

== Early history of the violin in Cuba ==
We can find a representation of the bowed strings family in Cuba's history since a very early stage, because during the 16th century a musician from the Ville of Trinidad, named Juan Ortiz, is mentioned by the chronicler Bernal Díaz del Castillo as a "great performer of "vihuela" and "viola" (viol). The Renaissance viol is the direct ancestor of the modern Italian violins, which began to become popular since the 16th century.

There is documentation during the 18th century about the utilization of the violin in the musical activity of the Island. Alejo Carpentier mentions in his book "La Música en Cuba" the existence of a family composed by musicians that established their residence in the city of Santiago de Cuba, about the first half of the century.

The founder of the family, violinist Leonardo González Abreu (1706), was born in the Canary Islands, Spain, and was married to a local harpist named Bernarda Rodríguez Rojas, along which he raised an entire family dedicated to the music activity for several generations.

On February 8, 1764, Esteban Salas y Castro, the new Chapel Master, arrived at the Santiago de Cuba Cathedral. To fulfill his musical duties, Salas counted with a small vocal-instrumental group that included two violins.

After the arrival in Santiago de Cuba, in 1793, of numerous colonists who fled from the slave revolt in Saint Domingue, Karl Rischer and Madame Clarais, having brought with them a clavichord, founded an orchestra with flute, oboe, clarinet, trumpet, three horns, three violins, viola, two violoncellos and percussion.

Also during the second half of the 18th century, violinist Ramón Menéndez earned great reputation and the respect of the new generations of musicians; for that reason he was called "The Master" (El Maestro). He was a professor of many renowned performers, such as Tomás Buelta y Flores and Secundino Arango.

== 19th century ==
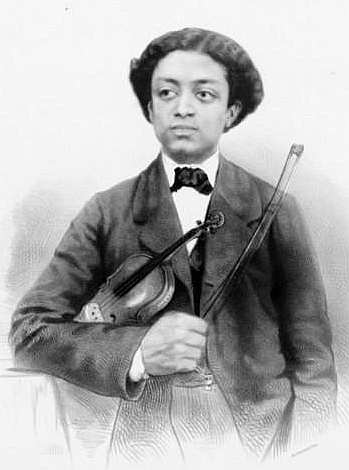
José White in 1856, after receiving First Prize from the Conservatoire de Paris

During the transition from the 18th to the 19th centuries, the Havanese Ulpiano Estrada (1777–1847) offered violin lessons and conducted the Teatro Principal orchestra from 1817 to 1820. Apart from his activity as a violinist, Estrada kept a very active musical career as a conductor of numerous orchestras, bands and operas, and composing many contradanzas and other dance pieces, such as minuets and valses. Similarly to Estrada and approximately during the same time period, José Mercedes Betancourt (17?-1866) developed an active career as violinist and professor, as well as conductor and composer, but this time in the city of Camagüey. Aldo Joaquín Gavira (1780–1880) was also a prominent violinist and professor in Havana. José Vandergutch, Belgian violinist, arrived at Havana along with his father Juan and brother Francisco, also violinists. They returned at a later time to Belgium, but José established his permanent residence in Havana, where he acquired great recognition. Vandergutch offered numerous concerts as a soloist and accompanied by several orchestras, around the mid-19th century. He was a member of the Classical Music Association and also a director of The "Asociación Musical de Socorro Mutuo de La Habana." Another important violinist from the first half of the 19th century was Secundino Arango. A disciple of Ramón Menéndez, he served as an organist in the La Merced Church. Arango composed many danzas and guarachas, as well as religious music, motets and salves. Near the end of his life he worked as an organist at the San Francisco Convent in Guanabacoa, Havana. José White dedicated his last study, from a series of six to Secundino Arango, thus highlighting with his homage the renown acquired by this Havanese musician during his lifetime.

During the 19th century, within the universe of the classical Cuban violin, there were two outstanding masters that were considered among the greatest violin virtuosos of all times; they were José White Lafitte and Claudio Brindis de Salas Garrido.

After receiving his first musical instruction from his father, the virtuoso Cuban violinist José White Lafitte (1835–1918) offered his first concert in Matanzas on 21 March 1854. In that presentation he was accompanied by the famous American pianist and composer Louis Moreau Gottschalk, whom encouraged him to further his musical instruction in Paris, and also collected funds for that purpose. José White studied musical composition in the Conservatoire de Paris from 1855 to 1871. Just ten months after his arrival he received the First prize in the violin category on the Conservatorie's contest and was highly praised by Gioachino Rossini. At a later time he was a professor of the renowned violinists George Enescu and Jacques Thibaud. From 1877 to 1889, White was appointed as director of the Imperial Conservatory in Rio de Janeiro, Brasil, where he also served as court musician of the Emperor Pedro II. At a later time he returned to Paris, where he stayed until his death. The famous violin named "Swan's song" was his preferred instrument and his most famous composition is the Habanera "La bella cubana". White also composed many other pieces, including a concert for violin and orchestra.

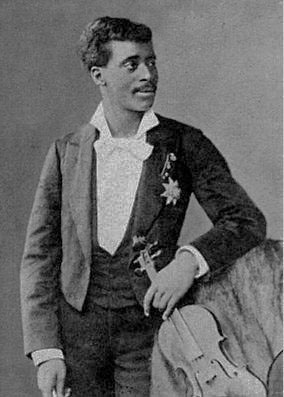
Claudio José Domingo Brindis de Salas y Garrido, called the "Black "Paganini" posing with his famous Stradivarius

Claudio Brindis de Salas Garrido (1852–1911) was a renowned Cuban violinist, son of the also famous violinist, double-bassist and conductor Claudio Brindis de Salas (1800–1972), which conducted one of the most popular orchestras of Havana during the first half of the 19th century, named "La Concha de Oro" (The Golden Conch). Claudio José surpassed the fame and expertise of his father and came to acquire international recognition. Brindis de Salas began his musical studies with his father and continued with Maestros José Redondo and the Belgian José Vandergutch. He offered his first concert in Havana in 1863, in which Vandegutch participated as accompanist. The famous pianist and composer Ignacio Cervantes also participated in that event. According with the contemporary critique, Brindis de Salas was considered one of the most outstanding violinists of his time at an international level. Alejo Carpentier referred to him as: "The most outstanding black violinist from the 19th century... something without any precedent in the musical history of the continent...". The French government named him member of the Légion d'Honneur, and gave him a nobility title of "Baron". In Buenos Aires he received a genuine Stradivarius, and while living in Berlin he married a German lady, was named Chamber Musician of the Emperor and received an honorary citizenship from that country. Brindis de Salas died poor and forgotten in 1911 from tuberculosis, in Buenos Aires, Argentina. In 1930 his remains were transferred to Havana with great honors.

Another outstanding Cuban violinist from the 19th century was Rafael Díaz Albertini (1857–1928). He studied violin with José Vndergutch and Anselmo López (1841–1858), well known Havanese violinist that was dedicated also to music publishing. In 1870, Albertini travelled to Paris with the purpose of perfecting his technique with famous violinist Jean-Delphin Alard, and in 1875 received first prize in the Paris Contest, in which he subsequently participated as a Juror. He toured extensively through the world, accompanied some times by prestigious Masters such as Hugo Wolf and Camille Saint-Saëns. In 1894 he made presentations, along with Ignacion Cervantes, through the most important cities of Cuba.

A list of prominent Cuban violinist from the second half of the 19th century and the first of the 20th may include: Manuel Muñoz Cedeño (1813– ), José Domingo Bousquet (1823– ), Carlos Anckermann (1829–1909), Antonio Figueroa (1852– ), Ramón Figueroa (1862– ), Juan Torroella (1874– ), Casimiro Zertucha (1871–1960), Joaquín Molina (1884– ), Marta de La Torre (1888– ), Catalino Arjona (1895– ) and Diego Bonilla (1898– ).

== 20th century ==
During the first half of the 20th century the name of Amadeo Roldán stands out (1900–1939), because apart from an excellent violinist, professor and conductor, Roldán is considered one of the most important Cuban composers of all times. He was born in Paris from a Spanish father and a Cuban mother. At a later time he travelled to Cuba, obtained its citizenship, and studied with his mother, pianist Albertina Gades. Afterwards he went to the "Conservatorio de Música y Recitación" in Madrid, Spain, where he studied violin with Agustín Soler and Antonio Fernández Bordas.

In 1917 Roldán received the Sarasate violin award and began working in the Madrid Symphony Orchestra as a violinist. He also offered concerts in several Spanish cities. In 1919 Roldán travelled to Cuba, where began working as a professor, and subsequently, in 1922, he joined the Havana Symphony Orchestra, conducted by Pedro Sanjuán. In 1926, he organized together with Alejo Carpentier a series of concerts of contemporary Cuban music, and next year participated as first violin in the Havana String Quartet, along with famous composer Joaquín Turina. In 1931, he founded with the pianist César Pérez Sentenat the Havana "Escuela Normal de Música" and was named conductor of the Philharmonic Orchestra of Havana. Roldán was also director of the Havana Municipal Conservatory, that still bears his name.

Alberto Mateu (1903-1972) was born in Guanabacoa, Havana, and studied violin at Conservatorio Mateu, from which his father was founder and director. At a later time, Mateu travelled to Brussels, where he continued his musical studies. He offered concerts in several European cities, as well as in Cuba, where he appeared as a soloist and also accompanied by the Philharmonic Orchestra of Havana. He performed in the United States and became a U.S. citizen and lived in Chicago.

After his graduation at the Conservatoire de Paris in 1935 with just 16 years old, the renowned Cuban violinist Ángel Reyes (1919–1988) developed a very successful career as a soloist and also accompanied by prestigious orchestras of many countries. He established his residence in the United States at a very young age, obtained an award in the Ysaÿe Contest in Brussels and was a professor at the Michigan and Northwestern Universities, until his retirement in 1985. Reyes was the owner the famous violin Lipinsky Stradivarius, with which he performed the Glazunov violin concert along with the Philharmonic Orchestra of Havana, conducted by Massimo Freccia, in November 1942. He also performed the same piece with the Philadelphia Orchestra conducted by Eugene Ormandy. Reyes also obtained a violin from Carlo Bergonzi, known as the "Kreisler Bergonzi", previously owned by Fritz Kreisler and at a later time by Itzhak Perlman.

Eduardo Hernández Asiaín (1911–2010) was born in Havana, began his musical studies at a very early age and offered his first concert with just seven years old. When he was 14, he obtained the First Award at the Municipal Conservatory of Havana and was appointed as Concertino of Havana Symphony Orchestra. In 1932, he travelled to Madrid to further his musical education with professors Enrique Fernández Arbós and Antonio Fernández Bordas. There he received the Sarasate Award in the "Real Conservatorio de Música de Madrid", the "Certamen Internacional de Violinistas", organized by Unión Radio, as well as the "Concurso Nacional de Violinistas" and the "Concurso de Música de Cámara", both promoted by the Education Ministry.

Since 1954, Hernández Asiaín performed as a soloist with the orchestras from the Pasdeloup Concert Society and the Radiodiffusion française in Paris, the "Orquesta Nacional de España", the "Orquesta Sinfónica de Bilbao", the "Orquesta de Cámara de Madrid" and the "Orquesta Sinfónica y de Cámara de San Sebastián", of which he is the founder. In 1968, he was appointed as First Violin of the "Cuarteto Clásico" of RTVE, participating with pianist Isabel Picaza González in the "Quinteto Clásico de RNE", with which he offered concerts and made numerous recordings in Spain and other countries. He also toured extensively through the US.

Other prominent Cuban violinists from the first half of the 20th century are: Robero Valdés Arnau (1919–1974), Alberto Bolet and Virgilio Diago.

After 1959, already in the post revolutionary period, stands out a Cuban violinist that has made a substantial contribution, not just to the development of the violin and the bowed string instruments, but also to the national musical culture in general.

Evelio Tieles began to study music in Cuba with his father, Evelio Tieles Soler, when he was just seven years old, and continued at a later time with professor Joaquín Molina. Between 1952 and 1954, Tieles studied violin in Paris, France, with Jacques Thibaud and René Benedetti. In 1955 he returned to Paris and studied at the National Superior Music Conservatory in that city, and in 1958, he continued his musical training at Conservatorio Tchaikovsky in Moscú, where he was a disciple of renowned violinists David Oistrakh and Igor Oistrakh. Tieles graduated in 1963 and by recommendation of the Conservatory he pursued his master's degree from 1963 to 1966, with the same mentioned professors. Tieles received also professional training from the prestigious violinists Henryk Szeryng and Eduardo Hernández Asiaín. Evelio Tieles has offered numerous presentations as a concert performer, in a duo with his brother, pianist Cecilio Tieles, or accompanied by the Cuban National Symphony Orchestra and other symphonic and chamber ensembles. He has performed along with prestigious conductors such as Thomas Sanderling, Boris Brott, Enrique González Mántici y Manuel Duchesne Cuzán, among others. Evelio Tieles worked in the National School of Arts and the Superior Institute of Arts in Havana, Cuba, where he served as professor and head of chair of bowed string instruments since the inception of both academic institutions. He also served also as national advisor of bowed string instruments since 1967 to 1981, and between years 1997 and 2004. Tieles is currently professor and consultant professor at the University of the Arts. Tieles has established his residence in Spain since 1984, and he teaches violin in the Vila-Seca Conservatory, in the province of Tarragona, where has been appointed as "Professor Emeritus". He has also served at the Superior Conservatory of the Barcelona Lyceum as chief of the Chamber Music Department (1991–1998), head of the Division of Bowed String Instruments (1986–2002) and academic director (2000–2002). Apart from his outstanding career as a concert performer and professor, during the Post-Revolutionary period, Tieles promoted and organized in Cuba the bowed string instruments training, fundamentally for the violin. He dedicated great energy, time and effort to the promotion of activities that benefit the cultural training and development, not just in his native Cuba, but also in Spain, for which he has received national recognitions such as the Distinctions for the National Culture and the Artistic Teaching, the Diploma to the Artistic Merit from the Superior Institute of Art, in 2002, the 50th Anniversary of FAR Medal in 2007 and the Distinction for the National Culture Medal in 2011.

Another prominent violinist is professor Alla Tarán (1941). She was formed as a violinist in her native Ukraine and worked as professor of Chamber Ensemble Practice. Tarán established her residence in Cuba since 1969. Alla Tarán is one of the most prestigious violin professors in Havana and has contributed to the formation of several generations of Cuban musicians, many of them outstanding instrumentalists, such as Ilmar López-Gavilán. Alla Tarán has worked in Cuba as violin professor in several schools in the provinces of Santa Clara and Cienfuegos, as well as an assistant Concertino at the Havana Symphony Orchestra. Since 1978 she lives in Havana, where she has developed an outstanding effort as professor of violin at the National School of Arts, the Manuel Saumell Conservatory, the Amadeo Roldán Conservatory and the Instituto Superior de Arte (ISA). Alla Tarán founded the first Children's Symphony Orchestra and the first Violin Ensemble in Cuba, which is still active. She received the Pedagogic Merit Medal and other important recognitions for her labor.

Violinist Oscar Carreras (1944-19?) studied in the National School of Arts in Havana, Cuba, and joined the Matanzas Symphony Orchestra. At a later time, he studied at the Tchaikovsky Conservatory in Moscow and after his graduation he offered presentations as a soloist and with the National Symphony Orchestra in multiple concerts throughout the Island. He awas also a professor of the Instituto Superior de Arte (ISA).

Alfredo Muñoz (1949) began studying the violin at Conservatorio Orbon in Havana, Cuba, and subsequently continued at the National School of Arts and the Instituto Superior de Arte (ISA). He joined the National Symphony Orchestra as a violinist in 1972 and since then has been very active as a soloist and a member of the White Trio, in Cuba and abroad. He is currently a professor at the Instituto Superior de Artes (ISA).

Other Cuban violinists that have developed their careers between the 20th and the 21st century are: Armando Toledo (1950), Julián Corrales (1954), Miguel del Castillo and Ricardo Jústiz.

== 21st century ==
Already at the beginning of the 21st century we should mention the violinists Ilmar López-Gavilán, Mirelys Morgan Verdecia, Ivonne Rubio Padrón, Patricia Quintero, Rafael Machado, and Sandro Leal-Santiesteban.

Cuban violinist Ilmar López-Gavilán began studying at the Municipal Conservatory of Havana and when he was just 14 years old was selected to continue his musical education at the Tchaikovsky Conservatory in Moscow. He studied at a later time in the "Escuela de Música Reina Sofía", in Spain, th Manhattan School of Music, in New York and Rutgers University. López-Gavilán has received instruction from Glenn Dicterow, Zachar Bron, Maia Glizarova, Abraham Stern y Arnold Steinhardt, as well as Yehudi Menuhin, Ruggiero Ricci and Isaac Stern. He has offered concerts in Cuba, México, Venezuela, Spain, Portugal, Russia and several cities in the US; and has received awards from the Sphinx Competition, the Lipinsky-Wieniawski Contest in Poland and the Henryk Szeryng International Competition. López-Gavilán serves as Concertino at the Philadelphia Virtuosi Chamber Orchestra and also participates in the New Jersey Symphony.

Mirelys Morgan was born in Havana and studied at the Instituto Superior de Arte (ISA). She has performed with the Cuban National Symphony Orchestra and the Cali Symphony Orchestra in Colombia. Morgan was selected by Claudio Abbado to participate in the Gustav Mahler Youth Orchestra Project in year 2000. She established her residence in Europe in 2003, where she studied with Rainer Schmidt at the Reina Sofía School of Music in Madrid and with Ulf Wallin at the Hans Eisler Hochschule für Musik in Berlín. Mirelys Morgan has participated in numerous concert tours as a member of the Gustav Mahler Youth Orchestra and the Verbier Festival Orchestra, under the conduction of Valery Gergiev, James Levine, Charles Dutoit and Michael Tilson-Thomas. She has performed also with the Deutsches Symphonie Orchester and the Deutsche Oper Orchester in Berlín, as well as with the Frankfurt Radio Symphony. Morgan joined the Orquesta Nacional de España in 2009, and is currently a member of the Concertgebouw Orchestra in Amsterdam, Holland.

Ivonne Rubio Padrón was born in Havana and began to study violin at the age of seven. During the year 2005 she was selected to join the Latinamerican Youth Orchestra in Venezuela, conducted by Claudio Abbado and Gustavo Dudamel. She has received Master Classes from important personalities such as Gidon Kremer, Francesco Manara, Renaud Capuçon and Mauricio Fucks, among others, and have received national awards from the Festival de Violín Manuel Saumell 2001, the Concurso Iberoamericano de Violín José White 2003, and the Concursos Musicalia 2009. Ivonne Rubio serves as a Concertino at the Campeche Symphony Orchestra, in Mexico, and offers classes in the same city.

Rafael Machado began to study violin and musical theory in Havana, Cuba, in 1972; and received his master's degree in music from the Instituto Superior de Arte of Havana, in 1987. During this period of time he participated in important national violin competitions and obtained the first prize in the "José White" competition at the Instituto Superior de Arte (Havana, 1986). Machado was a member of the first Youth Latin-American Symphony Orchestra (Uruguay, 1985), and participated I the Festival of Young Performers organized by Juventudes Musicales de Perú, in 1986. Rafael Machado has performed as a soloist, a member of symphony orchestras and chamber ensembles in Cuba, Spain, Italy, France, Austria, Perú, Uruguay, the USEE.UU, Canada and México. He was a member of the Camerata "Brindis de Salas" in Havana, Cuba from 1987 to 1992, and of the Conjunto de Cámara de La Habana, from 1988 to 1992, and obtained a great national and international promotion for his participation in those ensembles.

In 1992 he arrived in México to participate in the Orquesta Sinfónica de Aguascalientes, serving as concertino in this ensemble for 18 years. He participated regularly as guest concertino in the Orquesta Filarmónica de Zacatecas. Machado was a member of "Solistas de México", from 1994 to 1995, a group created by Maestro Eduardo Mata, and also collaborated with the Camerata de las Américas from 1995 to 1999. Along with these ensembles, Machado participated in concerts and festivals in Mexico City, as well as in the Festival Internacional Cervantino from Guanajuato, Mexico, from 1994 to 1999. He recorded with the Quindecim label, along with Horacio Franco and the Camerata Aguascalientes in 1998, and was invited to the "Puebla Instrumenta Verano 2004"as a coordinator of the Festival Symphony Orchestra. Machado was selected in 2004, as an artist in residence at the Banff Arts Center in Alberta, Canada. Since 2005, Machado was Artistic Director of the Festival de Música de Cámara de Aguascalientes, a Project that he promoted at a national as well as an international level; and he served also as a concertino of the Orquesta Filarmónica del Estado de Querétaro. He is currently working at the Center for Musical Experimentation and Promotion Ensemble (Ensamble del CEPROMUSIC, Centro de experimentación y promoción de la música contemporánea) in Mexico City. Rafael Machado has served as violin professor at the Music Faculty of the Universidad Autónoma de Zacatecas, and at Conservatorio de Música "José Guadalupe Velázquez" in Querétaro.
