= The Tyrant =

The Tyrant may refer to:

== Literature ==
- The Tyrant: An Episode in the Career of Cesare Borgia, a Play in Four Acts, a 1925 play by Rafael Sabatini
- The Tyrant, a 1926 novel by Max Brand
- The Tyrant (French: L'Ogre), a 1973 novel by Jacques Chessex
- The Tyrant, a 1987 novel by Patricia Veryan
- The Tyrant, a 2002 novel by Eric Flint and David Drake, the eighth overall installment in The General series
- The Tyrant, a 2003 novel by Michael Cisco
- The Tyrant, a 2020 novel by Seth Dickinson, the third installment in the Masquerade series

== Television ==
- "The Tyrant", Elephant Boy episode 1 (1972)
- "The Tyrant", House season 6, episode 4 (2009)
- "The Tyrant", Planet of the Apes episode 11 (1974)
- "The Tyrant", Robert Montgomery Presents season 7, episode 20 (1956)
- "The Tyrant", The Flying Swan episode 8 (1965)
- "The Tyrant", The Private World of Miss Prim episode 2 (1966)
- "The Tyrant", The New Adventures of Zorro episode 6 (1981)
- "The Tyrant", Wanted Dead or Alive season 2, episode 9 (1959)

== See also ==
- "The Tyrants", an episode of Insight
- Tyrant (disambiguation)
- Tyranny (disambiguation)
- Tyrannus (disambiguation)
