= Tarn =

Tarn may refer to:

== Places ==
- Tarn (lake), a mountain lake or pool formed in a cirque excavated by a glacier

=== England ===
- The Tarn, a park, nature reserve, and lake in Mottingham, Royal Borough of Greenwich.
- Tarn or Barnsley, South Yorkshire, England
- Tarn Crag (disambiguation), a number of hills in the English Lake District
- Tarns, Cumbria
- Tarn Wadling, a former lake near High Hesket in Cumbria

=== France ===
- Tarn (department), a department in southwest France
  - Lisle-sur-Tarn, France, a commune in the Tarn department
  - Marssac-sur-Tarn, France, a commune in the Tarn département
- Tarn (river), a river in France
  - Gorges du Tarn, France, a canyon along the course of the Tarn River
- Tarn-et-Garonne, a department in southwest France

=== United States ===
- Tarn Oil Field, an oil field in Alaska, U.S.

=== Chile ===
- Mount Tarn, a summit on the southern part of the Strait of Magellan, Chile

=== Outer space ===
- 13032 Tarn, a main-belt minor planet

== People ==
- Aleks Tarn (born 1955), journalist and author
- Gary Tarn (born 1962), British filmmaker and composer
- Maria Dyer (née Tarn, 1803–1846), British Protestant Christian missionary to the Chinese
- Michael Tarn (born 1953), British film and television actor
- Nathaniel Tarn (born 1928), British-American poet
- Tarn Adams (born 1978), American co-creator of the video game Dwarf Fortress
- William Woodthorpe Tarn (1869–1957), 20th century British historian and author

== Transportation ==
- HMS Tarn (P336), a Second World War British T class submarine
- Tarn Light Railway

== Fiction ==
- Tarn, a type of large bird ridden by characters in the Gor fiction series by John Norman
- Tarn, a Decepticon in the Transformers franchise
- Tarn the Uncaring, a character in Marvel Comics

== See also ==
- Tarn Taran (disambiguation), various places
- Tarne, a spider genus of the family Salticidae (jumping spiders)
