= Taran =

Taran may refer to:

== Places ==
- Tarane, village in northern Lebanon
- Taran, Bulgaria, a village in Smolyan municipality
- Taran, Iran (disambiguation), several places in Iran
- Taran District, the name of a district of Kazakhstan; also, the capital of Taran District
- Taran Plateau, Antarctica

== People ==
- Taran (name), includes people with the given name and surname

== Other uses ==
- A Welsh god, associated with the Gaulish Taranis
- Rutilus heckelii or taran, a species of fish commonly known as roaches
- Taran (character), the main character in The Chronicles of Prydain books
  - The character appears in Disney's adaptation, The Black Cauldron
- Taran, original Russian term for aerial ramming
- SU-152 "Taran", a 1965 experimental Russian tank destroyer

== See also ==
- Taran Taran (disambiguation)
- Tarn Taran (disambiguation)
- Tarana (disambiguation)
- Taranis (disambiguation)
