= Taran, Iran =

Taran (Persian: ترن or طاران or طران) may refer to:

- Taran, East Azerbaijan (طاران - Ţārān)
- Taran, Meyaneh (طاران - Ţārān), East Azerbaijan Province
- Taran, Ilam (ترن - Taran)
- Taran, Sistan and Baluchestan (طران - Ţarān)
