= Taranis (disambiguation) =

Taranis is the Celtic god of thunder.

Taranis may also refer to:

- BAE Systems Taranis, a British unmanned aerial vehicle
- Taranis (gastropod), a genus of sea snail
- 5370 Taranis, an Amor asteroid
- TARANIS, a satellite mission for study of upper atmospheric lightning phenomena; failed to reach orbit in 2020
- Taranis, a character in British sitcom Chelmsford 123
- Taranis, an orchestral composition by Fabian Müller
- Taranis, codename for release 4.0 of the Trisquel Linux operating system
- Taranis Books, an imprint of the Scottish West Coast Magazine
- Taranis Patera, a crater on Jupiter's moon Io

== See also ==
- Taranes
- Tarani
- Taran (disambiguation)
- Tarana (disambiguation)
- Tanarus (disambiguation)
- Tyrannus (disambiguation)
