= Tarn Taran =

Tarn Taran may refer to:

- Tarn Taran Sahib, a city in Tarn Taran district, Punjab, India
- Tarn Taran district, a district in Punjab, India
- Tarn Taran, Pakistan, a village in Punjab, Pakistan
- Tarn Taran (Lok Sabha constituency)
- Tarn Taran (Assembly Constituency)

== See also ==
- Taran (disambiguation)
- Tarn (disambiguation)
