= Mottingham =

Area of south-east London

Coordinates: 51.4337°N 0.0365°E

Mottingham: The Mott
- Village
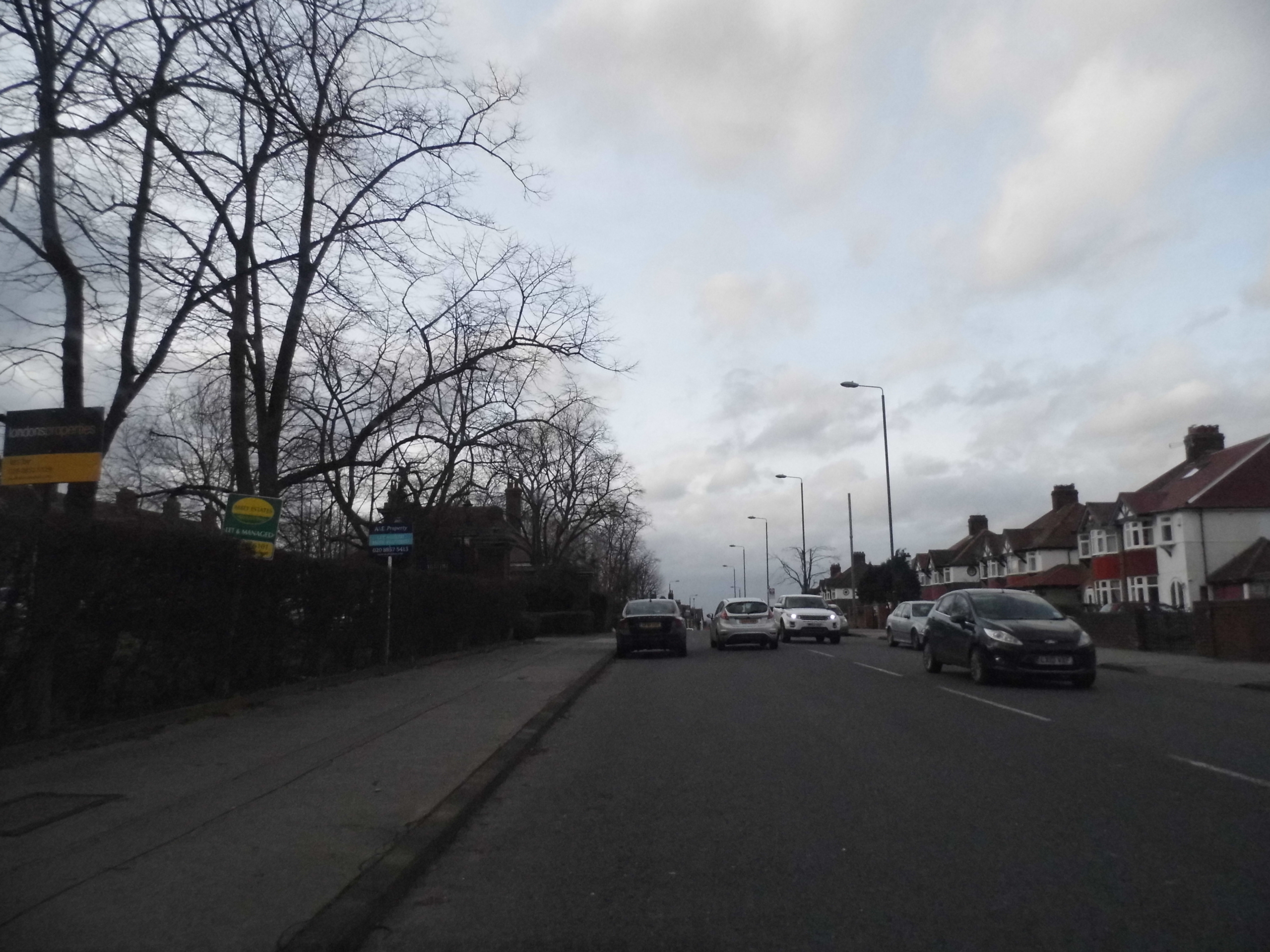
- Mottingham Road, the main road through the village

- Location within Greater London
- OS grid reference: TQ415725
  - Charing Cross: 9 mi (14.5 km) NW
- London borough: Bromley; Greenwich; Lewisham
- Ceremonial county: Greater London
- Region: London
- Country: England
- Sovereign state: United Kingdom
- Post town: LONDON
- Postcode district: SE9, SE12 (part)
- Dialling code: 020
- Police: Metropolitan
- Fire: London
- Ambulance: London
- UK Parliament: Eltham and Chislehurst
- London Assembly: Bexley and Bromley; Greenwich and Lewisham

Mottingham is a district of south-east London, England, which straddles the border of the London Borough of Bromley, the London Borough of Lewisham and the Royal Borough of Greenwich. It is located southwest of Eltham, 1 1/2 miles (2.5 kilometres). It was historically within the county of Kent.

== History ==
=== Toponymy ===
The earliest records of Mottingham are from 862 AD during the Anglo-Saxon era when it was recorded as Modingahema, which means the land of Moda's people and is commonly interpreted as "the proud place". In William Henry Ireland's 1830 work England's Topographer: Or A New and Complete History of the County of Kent Volume 4, he writes

Mottingham is a hamlet, lying partly in this parish (referring to Eltham), and partly in that of Chislehurst, at about a mile [1–2 km] southward from Eltham church. It was anciently called Modingham, from the Saxon words modig, proud or lofty, and ham, a dwelling. In King Edward the Confessor's confirmation of the gift of Elthruda, King Alfred's niece, of the manor of Lewisham and its appendages, to the abbey of St. Peter's, at Ghent, in Flanders, in 1044, Modingsham is mentioned as one of them belonging to that manor; but the succeeding grants of Lewisham manor make no mention of this place. In the reign of Edward I., it passed as an appendage to the manor of Eltham, in the grant made by that king to John de Vesci; since, which, it has always been considered as part of the same, which at this time claims over the whole of this hamlet. The bounds and extent of the hamlet of Modyngham are thus described in an ancient MS. remaining among registers of the bishop of Rochester:

Memorandum, That the lordship of Modyngham begins at Readhilde, and extends to the wood of the lord bishop called Elmystediswood, towards the south; and to the field, called Charlesfield, towards the west; and to the woods and lands of the king in Eltham, towards the north-east." At the beginning of the reign of King William Rufus, Ansgotus, of Chesilhurst, the king's chamberlain was possessed of the fee of this hamlet, and gave the tithes of it to the priory of St. Andrew's in Rochester. At the beginning of the reign of Edward III., a family of the name of Legh was possessed of certain tenements, with the land and appurtenances belonging thereto, in Modingham and Chesilhurst; from one of that name it passed to Thomas de Bankwell, at whose decease in the 35th year of the same reign, it was found to be possessed of them and held of the king in gavelkind, as one of his manor of Eltham by service of 14s. 11d. per annum rent and performing service to the king's court at Eltham.

In the 14th of Henry VI,. these premises were in the possession of Robert Cheeseman, of Lewisham and East Greenwich, who by marriage with Joane, daughter of Bernard Cavell of Chesilhurst, had considerably increased his property in this place. The family of Cavell was possessed of lands in that part of Modyngham which lies in Chesilhurst, as early as the reign of Edward I., for John Mayo, jun, by his deed in the 18th of Edward I. conveyed several premises in that part of the hamlet to Bernard Cavell sen. of Chesilhurst. The late Cheesman's who held this estate was Thomas Cheesman, whose heir Alice carried it in marriage to Robert Stoddard and his son George Stoddard, and Anne his wife in 1560 built the present mansion-house called Mottingham place, which with the lands belonging thereto, continued in their descendant till Nicholas Stoddard esq., dying in 1765 unmarried and intestate, there appeared many claimants to the inheritance. After a long litigation in the court of Chancery, this seat with the estate was adjudged to an heir by the female line, to William Bowereman esq. of Newport in the Isle of Wight, who passed away his interest therein to Mr. Dyneley, and he nearly rebuilt the seat and resided there. In the old house were the following dates and coats of arms; on the inside of a turret, 1560; on a chimney, 1561; and on an outward gate, 1635.

In the seventeenth century Thomas Fuller recorded in The Worthies of England a curious incident that happened on 4 August 1585:

...in the Hamlet of Mottingham (pertaining to Eltham in this county) in a Field which belongeth to Sir Percival Hart. Betimes in the morning the ground began to sink, so much that three great Elm trees were suddenly swallowed into the Pit; the tops falling downward into the hole; and before ten of the clock they were so overwhelmed, that no part of them might be discovered, the Concave being suddenly filled with Water. The compasse of the hole was about eighty yards, and so profound, that a sounding line of fifty fathoms could hardly find or feel the bottom.

The cause of the incident, referred to as a "marvellous accident" at the time, was then unknown, and it is likely that a sinkhole had developed. The area is well coursed with streams, both above and below ground, and the collapse or shifting of subsoil might be attributed to them. The site of the sinkhole is now unknown, and the incident is also largely unknown. The only body of standing water that is in the area today is a lake at The Tarn Bird Sanctuary.

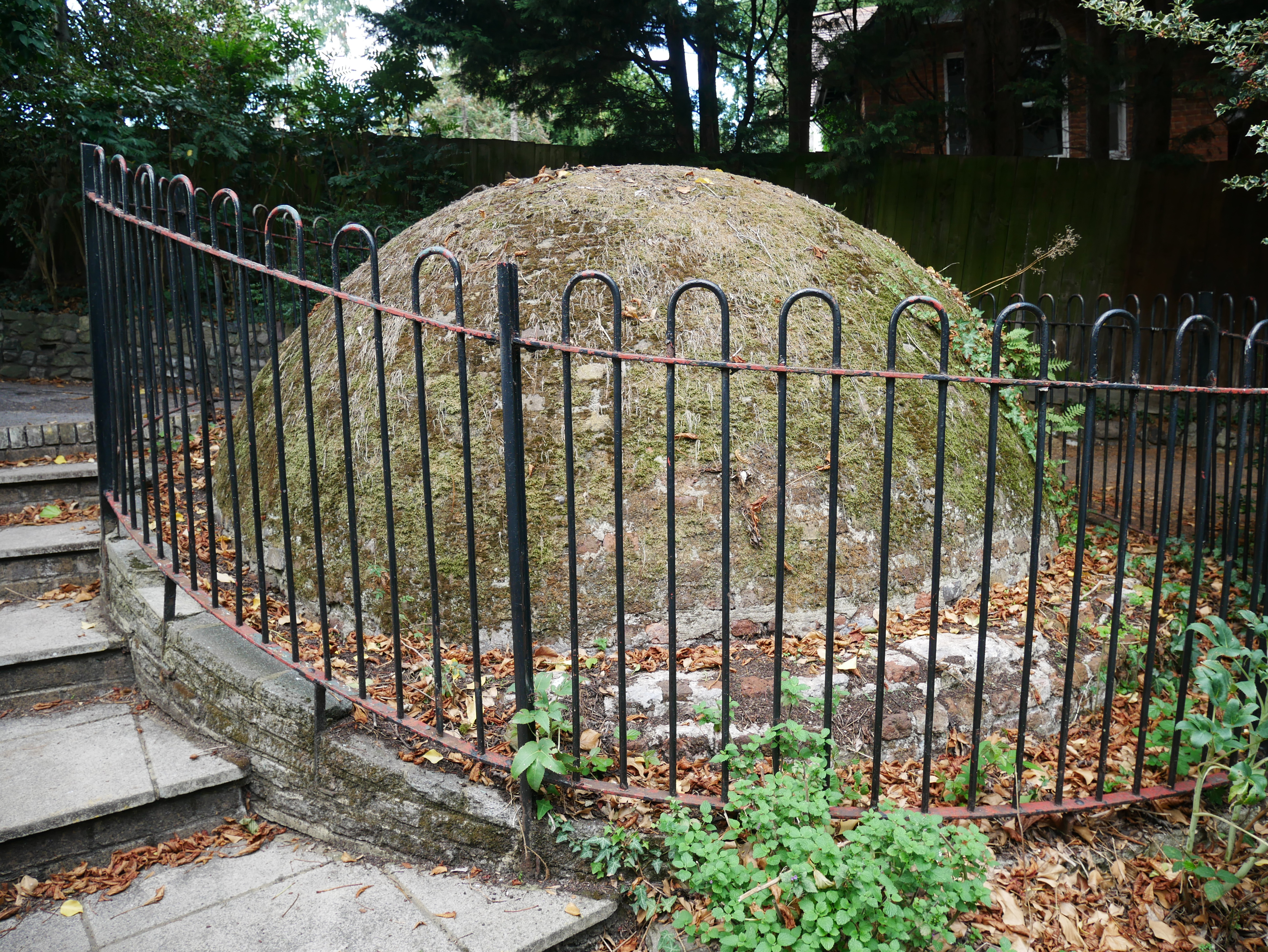
The eighteenth-century ice well in The Tarn is a Grade II listed structure

Mottingham was originally a farming hamlet, with a few large houses on Mottingham Lane, one of them Fairy Hall. Development began in the mid-19th century with the building of cottages on what is now Mottingham Road and the Terrace shops. Mottingham station opened in 1866, but was originally named for Eltham. In the 1880s the West Park estate, housing intended for the middle class, was developed and St. Andrew's church was built between the station and the village.

The opening of the Sidcup arterial road in 1923 led to suburban development at Mottingham, with the London County Council creating the Mottingham estate, with 2,000 houses, schools and shops, on Court Farm. The estate opened in 1935. The King and Queen pub, later used as a performance venue, opened in 1937; it was replaced by housing in 1992.

In January 2019, Bromley council approved the borough's Local Plan, a document outlining how and where Bromley will be developed up to 2030. Policy 18 details the commitment to improve the vitality and viability of the Mottingham Local Centre and Kimmeridge Cross Neighbourhood Centre, and to enhance links to other areas of Bromley and adjoining boroughs, particularly in relation to centres of employment.

=== Local government ===
Mottingham was originally a hamlet in Eltham parish, in the Blackheath hundred of Kent. In 1840 it was included in the Metropolitan Police District by the Metropolitan Police Act 1839. In 1866, the same year the station was opened, Mottingham was separated from Eltham as a distinct civil parish. In 1881, the parish had a population of 779 and covered an area of 642 acres (260 hectares).

When the County of London was created in 1889, Mottingham was excluded from the new county and formed a protrusion of Kent, bordering London to the west, north and east. From 1894 to 1934, it formed a 'detached part' of Bromley Rural District and had its own parish council. In 1931, the parish had a population of 2,120. On 1 April 1934, the rural district and the Mottingham civil parish were abolished and the area was transferred to form the parish of "Chislehurst and Sidcup" in Chislehurst and Sidcup Urban District. In 1965, the urban district was abolished and the area was transferred from Kent to Greater London, to form part of the London Borough of Bromley. The boundary between Bromley and Greenwich, and between Bromley and Lewisham, around Mottingham was adjusted in 1994. Most of the area is in the Mottingham ward of Bromley but the area around Mottingham Station is in the Mottingham, Coldharbour and New Eltham ward of Greenwich. Both wards are in Eltham and Chislehurst constituency.

=== Landmarks ===
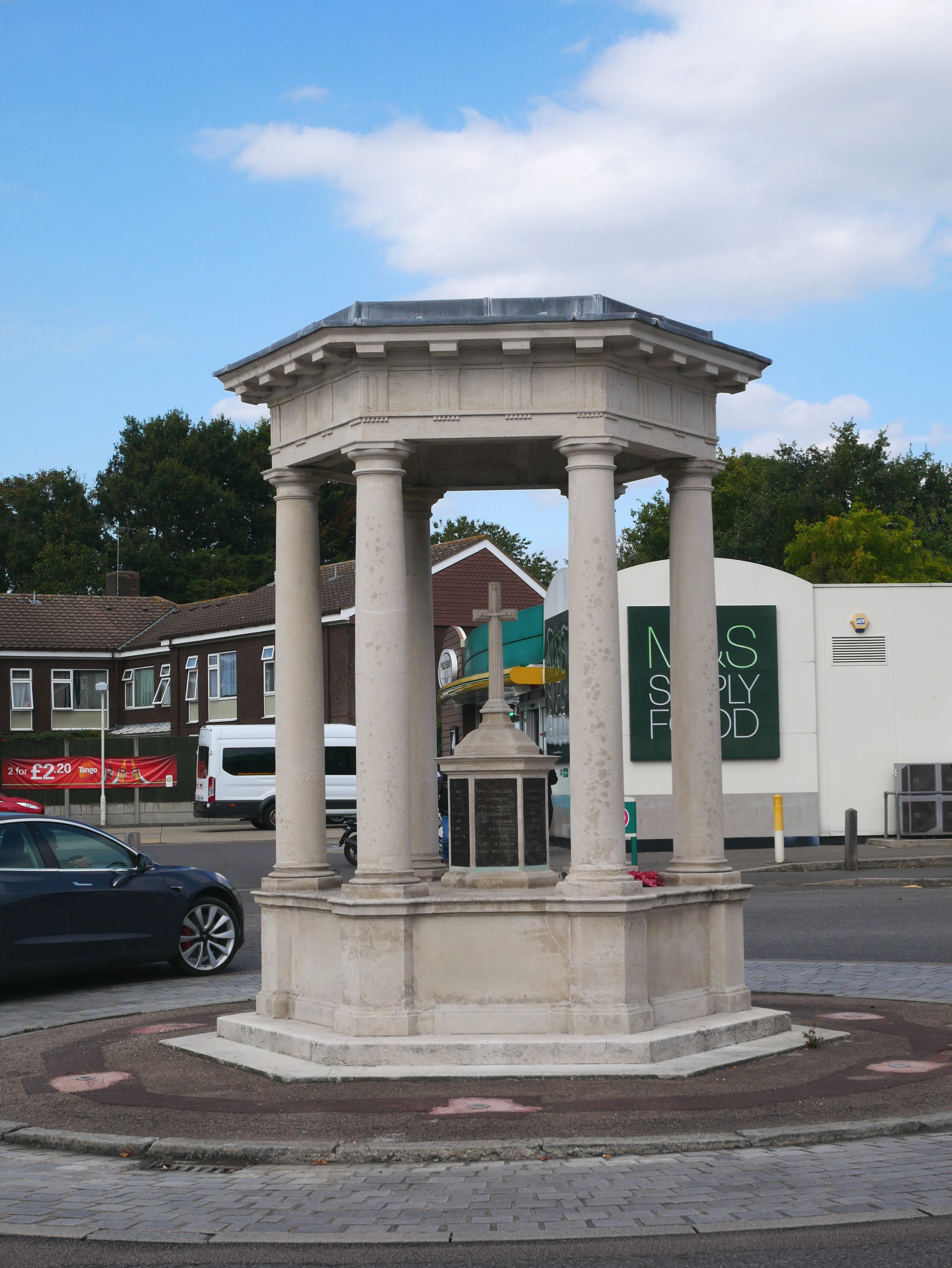
Mottingham war memorial

The first church in Mottingham was St Andrew's Church on Court Road, which was established in 1884 and further helped establish Mottingham as separate from Eltham.

Sir Robert Geffrye's almshouses on Mottingham Road were built by the Ironmongers' Company in 1912 to replace the almshouses in Hoxton that are now the Museum of the Home; they were remodelled by the Greater London Council and additional housing built in the grounds.

Martins Bank had a branch in Mottingham village, facing the war memorial; it was the first branch of the bank to undergo an armed raid, in 1967. It became a Barclays following their 1969 takeover of Martins, and was closed in 1992.

Also by the war memorial stood the Porcupine Inn public house, licensed as long ago as 1688. The premises dated from about 1800 and were replaced in 1922. The pub closed in 2013 and was acquired by German global discount supermarket chain Lidl, who tried and failed to obtain permission to develop the site. In 2022, Lidl appealed over the head of Bromley Borough and were given permission to clear the site and build their new supermarket. The new store opened for business in April 2023.

Mottingham has a branch of the fraternal order Independent Order of Oddfellows Manchester Unity.

Mottingham village contains a sign depicting Eltham College within the branches of a tree, a cricket bat and ball (making reference to W G Grace) and the date AD 862.

Mottingham and some of its landmarks appear in filmmaker Dewyne Lindsay's mini-documentary series London Districts.

=== Education ===
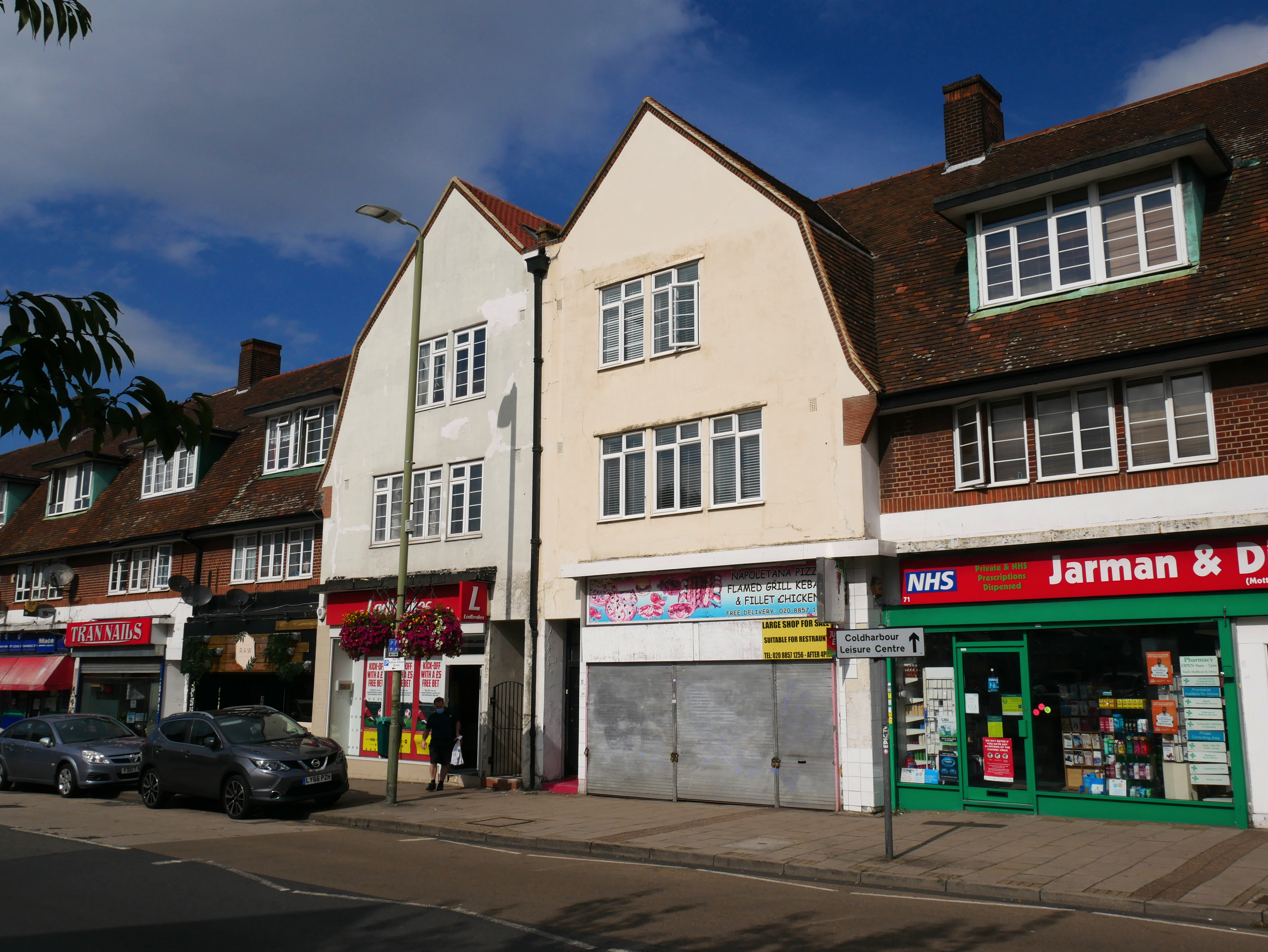
A parade of shops in Mottingham Road

==== Mottingham Primary School ====
Age range	4–11
Gender	Mixed
Number of pupils	408
School capacity	480

==== Elmstead Wood Primary School ====
Age range	3–11
Gender	Mixed
Number of pupils	210
School capacity	210

==== Capel Manor College ====
Capel Manor College is a specialist environmental college offering land-based further and higher education on a campus that was previously part of Hadlow College.

==== Eltham College ====
Eltham College, an independent day school for girls and boys 7–18, founded in 1842 as the London Missionary Society's School for the Sons of Missionaries, has been housed since 1912 in the former Fairy Hall in Mottingham, which had earlier been the Royal Naval School from 1889 to 1910.

== Geography ==
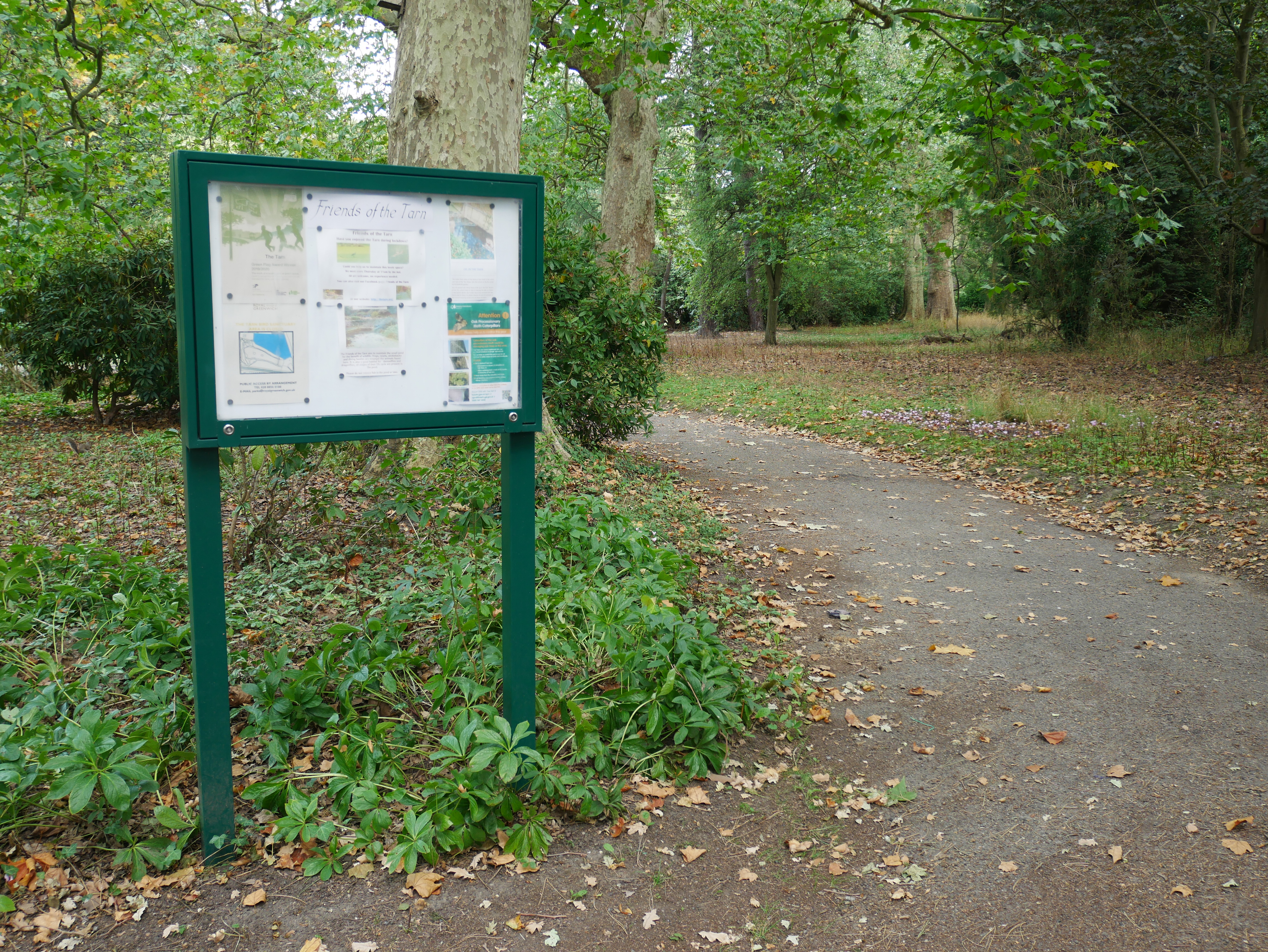
The Tarn is an area of wood and parkland in Mottingham

Mottingham borders Eltham to the north, New Eltham to the east, Chislehurst to the south, Elmstead to the south west, Lewisham to the west and Lee to the north west. Since 2010, Mottingham has fallen within the Mottingham and Chislehurst North polling and policing districts.

=== Quaggy ===
A tributary of the River Quaggy known as the Little Quaggy flows through Mottingham; rising on the borders of Chislehurst and Mottingham, it flows through The Tarn and emerges alongside the Sidcup bypass to join the Quaggy, which continues to Mottingham playing fields (colloquially known as 'Foxes Field').

=== Mottingham Estate ===
LCC cottage estates 1918–1939
Estate name	Area	No of dwellings	Population 1938	Population density
Pre-1914
Norbury	11	218	867	19.8 per acre (49/ha)
Old Oak	32	736	3519	23 per acre (57/ha)
Totterdown Fields	39	1262	—	32.4 per acre (80/ha)
Tower Gardens; White Hart Lane	98	783	5936	8 per acre (20/ha)
1919–1923
Becontree	2770	25769 (Note: Source says 2589 – transcription error)	115652	9.3 per acre (23/ha)
Bellingham	252	2673	12004	10.6 per acre (26/ha)
Castelnau	51	644	2851	12.6 per acre (31/ha)
Dover House Estate; Roehampton Estate	147	1212	5383	8.2 per acre (20/ha)
1924–1933
Downham	600	7096	30032	11.8 per acre (29/ha)
Mottingham	202	2337	9009	11.6 per acre (29/ha)
St Helier	825	9068	39877	11 per acre (27/ha)
Watling	386	4034	19110	10.5 per acre (26/ha)
Wormholt	68	783	4078	11.5 per acre (28/ha)
1934–1939
Chingford (Note: Part of a larger PRC estate around Huntsman Road)	217	1540	—	7.1 per acre (18/ha)
Hanwell (Ealing)	140	1587	6732	11.3 per acre (28/ha)
Headstone Lane	142	n.a	5000	
Kenmore Park	58	654	2078	11.3 per acre (28/ha)
Thornhill (Royal Borough of Greenwich)	21	380	1598	18.1 per acre (45/ha)
Whitefoot Lane (Downham)	49	n.a	n.a.	
Source: Yelling, J. A. (1995). "Banishing London's slums: The interwar cottage estates" (PDF). Transactions. 46. London and Middlesex Archeological Society: 167–173. Quotes: Rubinstein, 1991, Just like the country.

London County Council bought the Court Farm estate in the early 1930s and planned a 2000 home cottage estate. The first houses were to the west of Mottingham Road and completed in 1935. The estate was fairly self-contained; the community facilities included a shopping centre and several schools.

The British gangster film Piggy was filmed around North Kent, Mottingham and London and one scene was filmed in The Prince of Wales pub on Mottingham Road. African American boxer Frank Craig trained at the Prince of Wales for the bout he ultimately lost to Australian Dan Creedon in 1895.

=== Coldharbour Estate ===
In 1946 Woolwich Council built the Coldharbour Estate to the east of Mottingham Road, primarily to provide accommodation for local people made homeless by the Blitz. This completed the use of the LCC land.

== Transport ==
=== Rail ===
Mottingham railway station serves the district with Southeastern services to London Charing Cross, London Cannon Street via both Lewisham and Woolwich Arsenal, and Dartford.

=== Bus ===
- 124 to Eltham and to Catford via Grove Park
- 126 to Eltham and to Bromley via Grove Park
- 161 to North Greenwich via Eltham & Woolwich and to Chislehurst
- 273 to Lewisham Tesco and to Petts Wood
- 624 to Woolwich and to Grove Park (school bus)
- 638 to Kemnal College and to Coney Hall (school bus)

== Notable residents ==
- W. G. Grace, cricketer
- Eric Liddell, athlete and missionary
- Denis Healey, politician
- Rob Beckett, stand-up comedian
- Sir John Bertram Adams, physicist
- Jeffrey Lawal-Balogun, athlete
- Charles Folkard, illustrator of the Teddy Tail comic strip
