= Stabilizers (band) =

American pop band

The Stabilizers
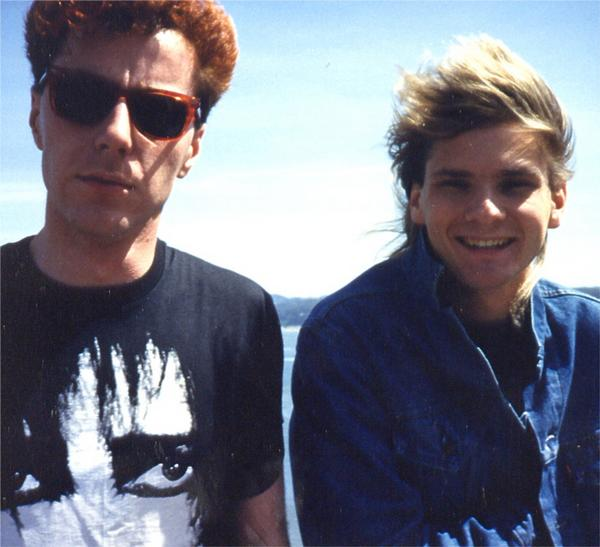

Background information
- Origin: Erie, Pennsylvania, United States
- Genre: Pop
- Years active: 1984-1991
- Labels: Columbia Records and MCA Records
- Past members: Dave Christenson; Rich Nevens; John Schaaf; George Hazuda; Jim Nordstrom

Stabilizers were an American pop/rock duo from Erie, Pennsylvania, founded in the mid-1980s by musicians Dave Christenson (lead vocals) and England-born Rich Nevens (guitars and occasional keyboards). The duo experienced moderate national success upon the release of their lone full-length album. They are perhaps best remembered for their 1986/87 single, “One Simple Thing”.

== History ==
In the early 1980s, Christenson was the bassist/singer in the local Erie band Prophecy, which also included keyboardist John Schaaf, who later joined Stabilizers’ Erie-based live band. Prophecy toured across Pennsylvania, Ohio, and New York, scoring a local hit with “Another American Rock 'N Roll Story”. The band broke up by design when Schaaf left for law school and drummer Brad Vargo left for medical school, playing their final show in 1984; Christenson connected with Nevens later that year to form Stabilizers, writing and recording the group's songs. George Hazuda was added on drums for live performances, with other members soon joining the group, including Schaaf on keyboards and saxophone. “The Stabilizers” had been the name of Nevens’ previous band, during his time in school at his alma mater, Penn State, and he reappropriated the moniker for the new group. After continuing to tour the Pennsylvania area and recording original compositions on a 4-track recorder, they were signed to Columbia Records in 1985, releasing Tyranny, their first and only album, the following year.

The first single from Tyranny, “One Simple Thing”, peaked at #21 on the Billboard Mainstream Rock Tracks chart in 1986 and #93 on the Billboard Hot 100 in 1987, helped by the band's performance of the song on American Bandstand. The song peaked at #100 in Australia. Two music videos were released to promote the album: “One Simple Thing”, directed by David Fincher, who would go on to greater success directing the feature films Alien 3, Se7en, and Fight Club; and “Tyranny”, directed by David Hogan. The “Tyranny” single failed to chart, and for the next five years, Stabilizers disappeared from view.

Following the acquisition of Columbia Records by Sony, Stabilizers signed a new deal with MCA Records, but did not initially release any material. However, in 1991, an unreleased track from the MCA Records sessions, “Maybe This Time”, was included in the film If Looks Could Kill and its soundtrack album.

Dave Christenson and Rich Nevens remained in fairly steady contact after the dissolution of the band.

David D. Christenson (born March 15, 1963, in Erie, Pennsylvania) died of lung cancer in Seattle, Washington on December 13, 2017, after a long illness. He was 54 and was survived by his wife and two sons.

== Band members ==
- Dave Christenson: lead vocals, occasional bass guitar
- Rich Nevens: guitar, keyboards
- John Schaaf: keyboards, saxophone
- George Hazuda: drums
- Jim Nordstrom: bass

== Discography ==
- Tyranny (Columbia Records, 1986)
