= The Tarn =

UK nature reserve

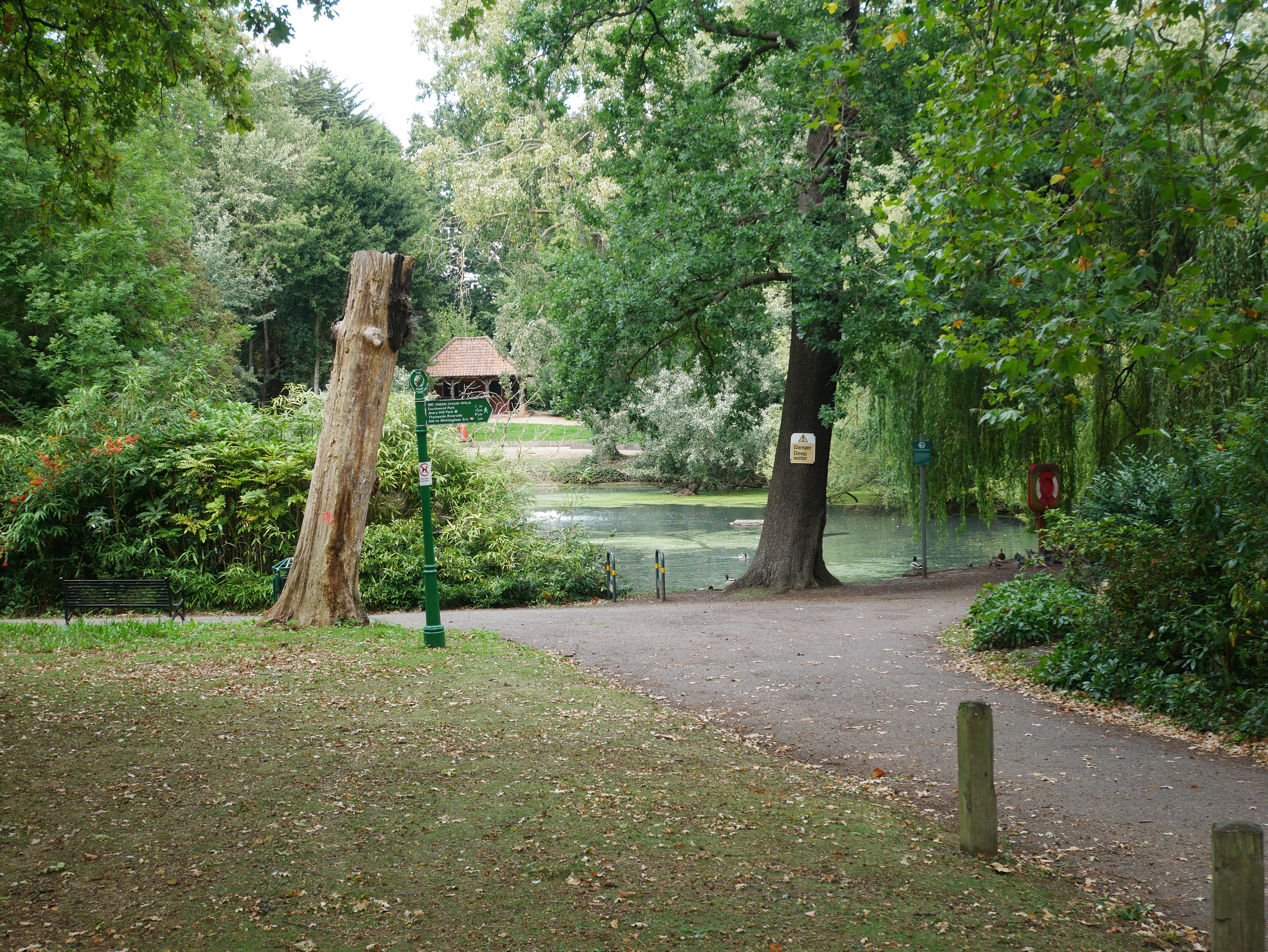
- The woodland of The Tarn, September 2020, looking north across the lake

- Location within Royal Borough of Greenwich
- Type: Public park Nature reserve
- Location: Mottingham in the Royal Borough of Greenwich, London, United Kingdom
- Coordinates: 51.440°N 0.055°E
- Area: 9 acres (3.6 ha) (total); 4.5 acres (1.8 ha) (bird sanctuary); 4.5 acres (1.8 ha) (public park); 2 acres (0.81 ha) (lake)
- Created: 1934 (acquired); 1935 (opened)
- Owner: Royal Borough of Greenwich
- Open: 8am - dusk
- Status: Open all year
- Awards: Green Flag Award (2012-2021)
- Public transit: Mottingham railway station, buses: 124, 126, 161, 624
- Website: The Tarn at www.royalgreenwich.gov.uk

The Tarn is a 9 acres (3.6 ha) site on Court Road between Mottingham and Eltham, in the Royal Borough of Greenwich, southeast London, United Kingdom, consisting of a public garden, a bird sanctuary nature reserve and a lake amongst woodland. The woodland and lake, which was historically known as Starbuck's Pond, were previously the southern part of the Great Park, one of three parks belonging to the estate of Eltham Palace and used as a royal deer hunting park for several centuries up until the English Civil War. As a garden The Tarn opened in 1935, after the Metropolitan Borough of Woolwich acquired the site from the adjacent Royal Blackheath Golf Club. The Tarn remains largely unchanged since the 1930s and contains several shelters, benches, a public toilets building and a circular path which crosses a wooden footbridge spanning the lake. There is also an 18th-century ice well in the garden, which is a listed structure.

== Description ==
The Tarn, is a site between Mottingham, and Eltham in the Royal Borough of Greenwich, containing a public park, or garden a bird sanctuary, and a lake, the vast majority of which is covered in woodland. The whole site is 9 acres (3.6 ha) in size, 2 acres (0.81 ha) being water, and 7 acres (2.8 ha) land; half the total area, or 4.5 acres (1.8 ha) is open to the public as a park and garden, and the other half is not usually open to the public, and is designated as a bird sanctuary nature reserve. The whole site of The Tarn is around 240 m (260 yd) across east to west, and 180 m (200 yd) north to south.

=== Public park ===
Half The Tarn's total area is a public park or garden 4.5 acres (1.8 ha) in size, although only 2.5 acres (1.0 ha) of the public space is land, the lake taking up the other 2 acres (0.81 ha). The part open to the public occupies the central area of the site, almost surrounding the lake, and the western part following Court Road. There are several crossing concrete paths north and south of the lake at the western end, and a single path along the western bank of the lake parallel to Court Road and connecting the two gated entrances, the road is higher than the park, so there is a slight embankment here, higher at the northern end where some of the path requires steps. A single path extends along most of the northern bank of the lake, and another opposite following the southern shore, a wooden and concrete footbridge spans the lake on the eastern side, where it is narrowest, and joins the two banks, and creating a circular walk around the park and lake. The Tarn contains, many wooden and iron benches, bins, and picnic benches; there is a public toilet building with a veranda shelter in the northwest of the park, and a circular gazebo structure in the southwest. The Tarn is wheelchair accessible, although there are steps near the northwest entrance, the southwest entrance and most of the park have wide paved paths with no steps. The park does not permit dogs, as they may disturb the wildlife. An 18th-century brick ice well is located in the gardens, next to the steps near the northwest bank of the lake, encircled by a small metal fence. The ice well is a Grade II listed structure, and a section of the top has been cut out, but fenced over so people can safely see inside.

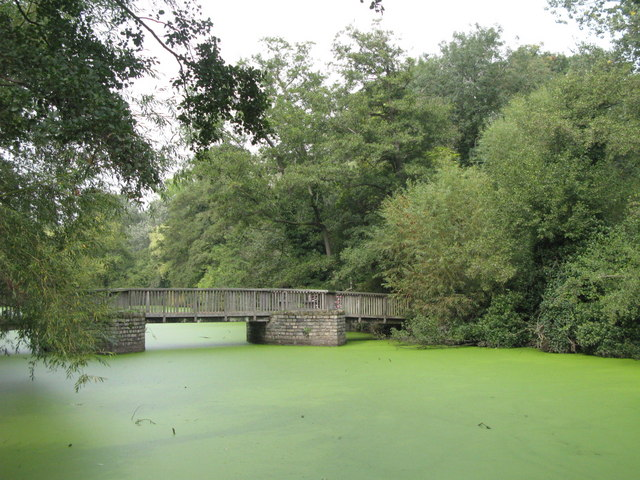
The wooden footbridge across the lake in The Tarn, when the water was covered in algae, September 2010

=== Lake ===
Since 1903, the lake itself has been referred to as The Tarn, before this time it was called Starbuck's Pond, although this name is no longer in use, there is a residential cul-de-sac road named Starbuck Close approximately 600 m (660 yd) northeast of the lake, on the other side of Royal Blackheath Golf Club. The lake is approximately 230 m (250 yd) long, east to west, and its width fluctuates between 20 m (22 yd) and 50 m (55 yd), being wider at the western end. The lake is just over 2 acres (0.81 ha) in area, mostly within the public park section, with the eastern end being within the bird sanctuary part, and the easternmost tip of the lake falling outside the grounds onto Royal Blackheath Golf Course. There are two small circular islands on the western side of the lake, and on the eastern side are a series of weirs, east of the footbridge. The eastern side of the lake, is fed by several inflows, several small straight drainage streams, coming from Royal Blackheath Golf Course to the east and northeast, and a larger natural stream coming from the south named, Little Quaggy. The Lake drains into a natural stream on the west side keeping the name Little Quaggy, which flows west from the lake, and joins the River Quaggy near Horn Park. Sometimes the lake has been covered in algae, but there has been efforts to reduce this, as it has caused harm to the birds. Few species of fish live in the lake, but there is a population of stickleback.

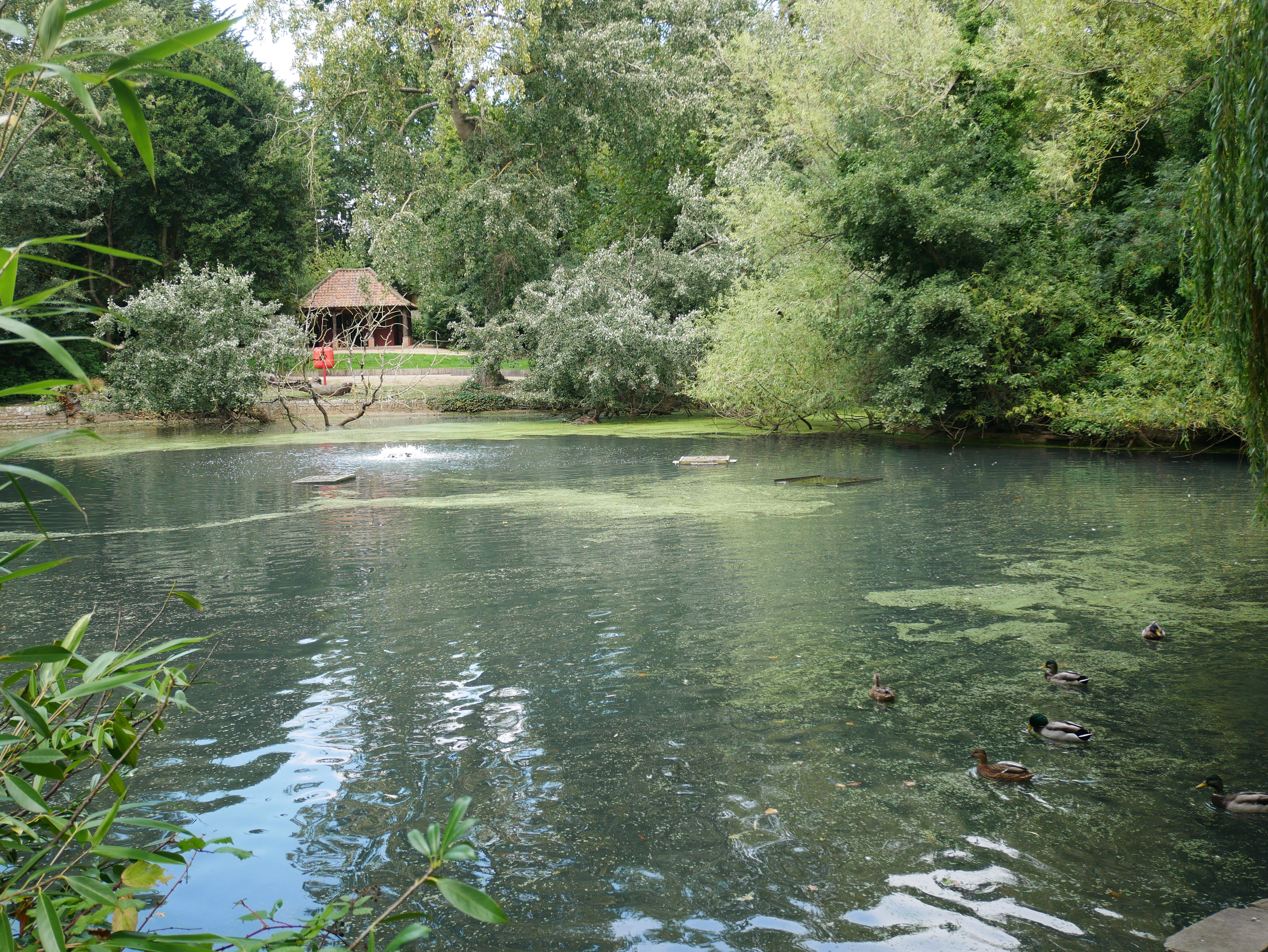
Mallard ducks, swimming in the lake at The Tarn, September 2020

=== Bird sanctuary, nature reserve ===
While birds and other wildlife obviously live and visit the whole wooded area, half The Tarn site is not usually open to the public, and is designated specifically as a bird sanctuary nature reserve 4.5 acres (1.8 ha) in size. The bird sanctuary is a wooded area northeast of the park and lake and fenced off from the public area. Numerous bird species are seen in The Tarn Bird Sanctuary and lake including Mallard, Feral pigeon, Canada goose, rose-ringed parakeet, Eurasian blue tit, coal tit, common blackbird, Eurasian collared dove, great tit, long-tailed tit, Eurasian magpie, tufted duck, cormorant, carrion crow, Jay, European robin, house sparrow, starling, dunnock,. and swan In connection with the Royal Society for the Protection of Birds, people have used The Tarn site to help with the Big Garden Birdwatch. A butterfly garden has also been set up in the garden just north of the bridge. Other wildlife that appears in The Tarn includes, foxes, squirrels, frogs. and bats.

== Location ==
The Tarn is located on the eastern side of Court Road in Mottingham opposite Mottingham railway station in the Royal Borough of Greenwich, southeast London, United Kingdom; its postcode is SE9 5AQ. The park is around 0.7 km (0.43 mi) north of Mottingham centre, 1 km (0.62 mi) south of Eltham and 1 km (0.62 mi) east of Middle Park.

=== Boundaries ===
The western boundary of The Tarn is an iron fence with two gates which join to Court Road, the road is higher than the park so there is a slight embankment here, larger at the northern end. The southern boundary is chain link fence separating the woodland from the railway line, just east of Mottingham railway station. The northern wooden fence of the bird sanctuary separates the area from the flats of a residential road named Tarnwood Park and the eastern edge of The Tarn is bordered by the grounds of Royal Blackheath Golf Club and Eltham Lodge.

=== Transport ===
The Tarn is located on Court Road which runs north to south and is part of the A208 road. Sidcup Road, a dual carriageway and part of the A20 road passes east to west around 150 m (160 yd) to the south of the nature reserve, joining Court Road at a traffic light controlled crossroads. Immediately west of The Tarn, on the opposite side of Court Road is Mottingham railway station, which lies between Lee and New Eltham railway stations on the Dartford Loop Line, and is 15.3 km (9.5 mi) southeast from Charing Cross railway station. The Tarn is also part of South East London Green Chain, a series of footpaths connecting green areas in southeast London.

There are bus stops immediately outside of the park's gates on both sides of Court Road, which are served by London Bus routes, 124, 126, 161, and 624, which take passengers to Eltham, Bromley, Woolwich, Chislehurst, Catford, and Grove Park among other areas.

== History ==
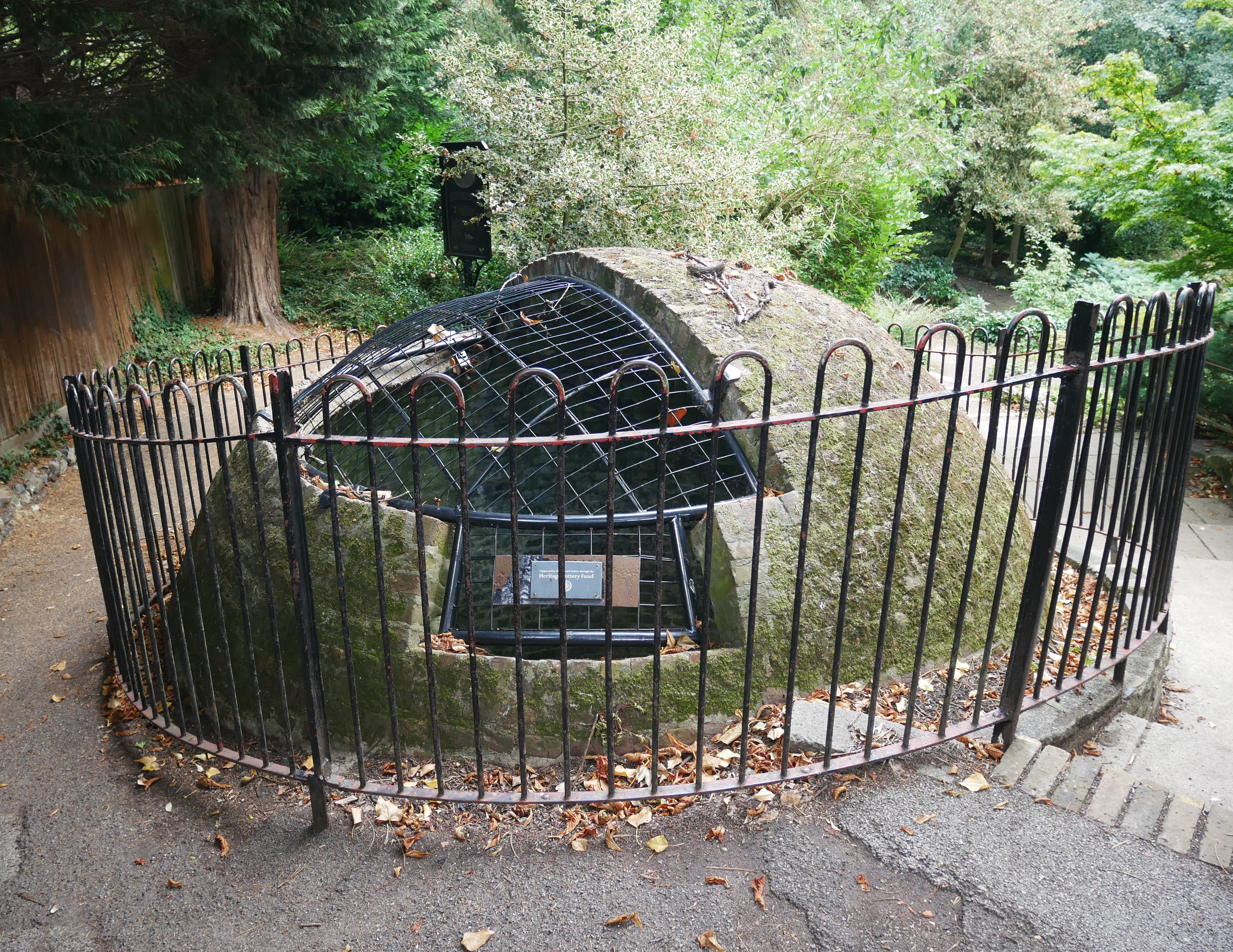
The eighteenth-century ice well in The Tarn is a Grade II listed structure, it has a section cut out, but barred over, so people can safely see inside, September 2020

=== Before the public garden ===
The area of The Tarn was previously the southern part of the Great Park, one of three parks belonging to Eltham Manor, later called Eltham Palace. Historically, Mottingham and Eltham Manor were part of the Eltham Parish, within the Hundred of Blackheath, in the Lathe of Sutton at Hone, west division of Kent. The land to the south of Eltham High Street, part of the London to Kent road, belonged to the estate of Eltham Manor. There were three parks belonging to Eltham Manor named, Middle Park, West Horne Park and Great Park. Great Park was the easternmost of Eltham Manor's Parks, it was around 1.3 km (0.81 mi) long north to south following the road south of Eltham, about 0.5 km (0.31 mi) wide east to west, and was a wooded park with a lake at the southern end.

During the reign of William the Conqueror, the estate of Eltham Manor was recorded to belonging to Odo of Bayeux. During the following centuries, the ownership of Eltham Manor including the area of woodland with a lake later known as The Tarn, fell in and out of Crown ownership several times. The land belonged to John de Vesci then William de Vesci in the 13th century followed by Gilbert de Aton, 1st Baron Aton and Geoffrey le Scrope in the 14th century. In 1315 King Edward II established the Great Park as a royal deer hunting park, which it would remain for several centuries, including the leases of Henry Guildford, Sir John Gates in the 16th century.

In the mid-17th century the lake had come to be known as Starbuck's Pond, at this time Edward Sackville, 4th Earl of Dorset was in charge of the land until the English Civil War when Charles I was captured in 1648, and Rich the rebel with commonwealth soldiers and common people sacked Eltham Palace, destroyed the parks and killed the deer, ending their use as deer parks. After Charles I was executed in 1649, Great Park came into the possession of Thomas Walsingham followed by Sir John Shaw, 1st Baronet in 1663. in 1664 Shaw ordered the construction of Eltham Lodge, a manor house within the Great Park, just north of the park's centre. The Great Park stayed with the Shaw family until the 19th century, when most of its area was turned into a golf course, which would later be named Royal Blackheath Golf Course, Eltham Lodge became the golf clubhouse.

A brick ice well was constructed in the 1750s, on the northwest side of The Tarn lake, it was used by the staff of Eltham Palace, which is around 650 m (710 yd) to the north-northwest. The ice well is still mostly intact, but with a section cut out of the top, but fenced over to allow people to safely see inside, it's in a fenced off area of the park, and was designated a Grade II listed structure on 8 June 1974. In February 2001, Greenwich Council was awarded £19,100 by the National Lottery Heritage Fund for restoration work on the ice well.

In 1889 the County of London was created, Eltham ceased being in Kent and was included in the new county, then in 1900 the County of London was divided into boroughs, Eltham became part of the newly created Metropolitan Borough of Woolwich. By 1903 the lake was referred to as The Tarn, Walter Claude Johnson, a civil engineer and architect purchased the land around the lake in 1904 and built a large house on the grounds. Famous gunsmith, Edwin Churchill, purchased the land and house in 1907 and spent £500 improving the house and grounds. Around this time a boathouse was constructed on the west side of the lake on the northern shore, it stood there until the 1940s when it was taken down.

=== As a public garden ===
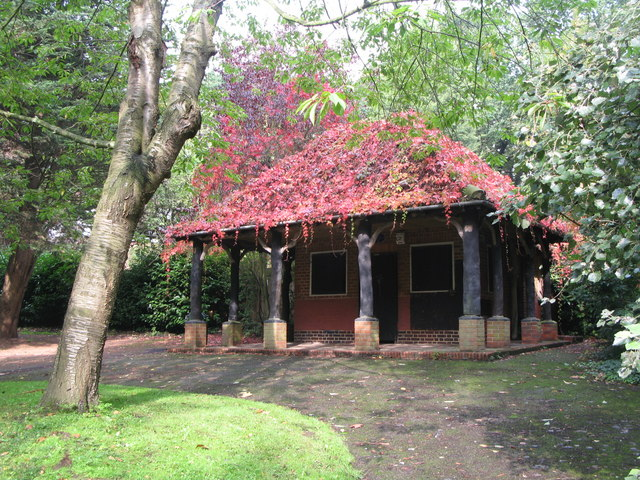
Refurbished public toilet building with shelter, September 2010, originally built shortly after the Metropolitan Borough of Woolwich acquired the site in the 1930s

In the early 20th century The Tarn was the southern part of the land owned by the Royal Blackheath Golf Course but in 1934 the Metropolitan Borough of Woolwich acquired the woodland and lake from the golf course, excluding the house built by Johnson. The Metropolitan Borough of Woolwich constructed a wooden bridge with stone foundations across the lake's narrowest part and landscaped the woodland, then opened the area as a garden and bird sanctuary in 1935. Much of the park's layout and features are the same as they were in the 1930s. In 1965 The Tarn along with the rest of Eltham became part of the newly created London Borough of Greenwich, of Greater London.

The wooden bridge across the lake was rebuilt in 1987, using the same stone foundations, and was opened by Mrs Ann Stroud on 24 April that year, with a plaque marking the occasion. In the 1980s and 1990s the Greenwich borough electoral ward covering the park was named Tarn the ward boundaries and names have been revised twice since then, and The Tarn is now within the ward named Eltham South. The Tarn has won the Green Flag Award several times between 2012 and 2021

Greenwich Council worked with Thames Water and the Environment Agency in 2009, and again in 2014 when the wildlife in The Tarn had been effected by pollution, toxins, and algae in the lake, causing many of the birds to contract Botulism, many of which died, although others were saved by animal rescue volunteers. In 2009 a pump was installed in the lake to improve oxygen levels, as were a number of small booms, to catch pollution and litter in the water. In early 2020, Greenwich Council, in response to the COVID-19 pandemic, decided to leave many of its parks, including The Tarn, unlocked and open to the public 24 hours a day, but had to reverse this decision in June the same year, and lock them again at dusk because of concerns of vandalism and other antisocial behaviour.

In 2023, a company named, Hikigaya 2 Ltd, applied to Greenwich Council to demolish a building named Bridge House at 11 Crossmead on the corner with Court Road, and build a 6 storey block of flats containing 32 homes, in addition to more plants and trees. Bridge House is a single, currently empty, building just to the south of the eastern side of The Tarn, on the other side of the railway line. The Planning Board of Greenwich Council, held a meeting on 23 July 2024, chaired by Councillor Garry Dillon, residents and the Friends of The Tarn objected to the plan. Concerns were about the safety of school children and disabled residents travelling past during construction. A resident of Crossmead, Dr Vince Smith, the Head of Digital Science at the Natural History Museum, London spoke of the environmental impact the construction would have, that a six storey building would have "An overbearing impact on this delicate biodiversity that exists in The Tarn." Adding that bats and birds of The Tarn would be affected the most by the construction. The architect, Jonathan Bailey, and the planning agent, Peter Turner stated the construction is necessary, to "deliver housing in this country on a national and local level" and this development would provide homes close to public transport. Adding the construction would "respect the local character and amenity of neighbours" and it would cause "minimum disruption" to residents and visitors of the Tarn. Councillor Pat Greenwell asked if either of them had visited The Tarn, to which they both said they hadn’t. She then asked "How are you in a position to say that there will be minimum disruption to residents if you’ve never been there? How do you know what impact a six-storey building is going to have on The Tarn?" The Planning Board decided to reject the proposal of constructing the new building.
