= Tyranny (disambiguation) =

Tyranny refers to a despotically ruled state or society.

- Tyranny (Julian Casablancas + The Voidz album), 2014
- Tyranny (Shadow Gallery album), 1998
- Tyranny (The Generators album), 2001
- Tyranny (Stabilizers album), 1986
- Tyranny (For You), album by Front 242
- "Tyranny", by Prodigy from Hegelian Dialectic
- Tyranny (TV series), an American drama and political thriller web series
- Gene Tyranny (1945-2020), American composer and musician
- Tyranny (video game), 2016 role-playing video game by Obsidian Entertainment

== See also ==
- Tyrant (disambiguation)
- Tyrannus (disambiguation)
- Tyranny of the majority, a theory of majority rule
- Tyranny of numbers, a difficulty in 1960s computer engineering
