= Tyrant (disambiguation) =

A tyrant is a ruler who governs unjustly.

Tyrant may also refer to:

== Music ==
Bands

- Tyrant (Japanese band), a black metal band in Japan
- Tyrant, a Los Angeles, American, doom metal band later known as Saint Vitus
- Tyrant, a Pasadena, American heavy metal band
- Tyrant, a German thrash metal band later known as Tormentor and finally as Kreator
- Tyrant Records, a Canadian record label which merged into Union Label Group

Albums

- Tyrant, an album by Swedish rock band Backyard Babies
- Tyrant, an album by Finnish rock band Circle
- Tyrant, an album by American band Thou

Songs

- "Tyrant", a song by heavy metal band Judas Priest on the album Sad Wings of Destiny
- "Tyrant", a song by OneRepublic on the 2007 album Dreaming Out Loud
- "Tyrants", a song by black metal band Immortal on the album Sons of Northern Darkness
- "Tyrants", a song by Catfish and the Bottlemen
- "Tyrant" (Beyoncé and Dolly Parton song), 2024
- Tyrant (Kali Uchis and Jorja Smith song), 2017

== Other uses ==
- Tyrant (American horse), winner of the 1885 Belmont Stakes
- Tyrant (British horse), winner of the 1802 Epsom Derby
- Tyrant (Marvel Comics), a comic book character for Marvel Comics
- Tyrant (Spiderbaby Grafix), a comic book series by Steve Bissette
- Tyrant (TV series), a 2014 American television series
- Tyrant (Ultra monster), a Kaiju (fictional monster)
- Tyrant flycatchers, a family of birds
- Tyrant (Resident Evil), a recurring enemy in the Resident Evil franchise.
- Tyrants, a partial title to the Mega Lo Mania video game as it was titled in the U.S.
- "Tyrant 22", the call sign of Army Ranger Kristoffer Domeij

== See also ==
- Tyranny (disambiguation)
- Tyrannus (disambiguation)
- The Tyrant (disambiguation)
