= Rafael Machado =

Cuban violinist

Rafael Machado is a Cuban violinist.

== Academic background ==
Rafael Machado began to study violin and musical theory in Havana, Cuba, in 1972; and received his Masters in Music from the Instituto Superior de Arte of Havana, in 1987. During this period of time he participated in important national violin competitions and obtained the first prize in the “José White” competition at the Instituto Superior de Arte (Havana, 1986). Machado was a member of the first Youth Latin-American Symphony Orchestra (Uruguay, 1985), and participated in the Festival of Young Performers organized by Juventudes Musicales de Perú, in 1986.

== Violinist ==
Rafael Machado has performed as a soloist, a member of symphony orchestras and chamber ensembles in Cuba, Spain, Italy, France, Austria, Perú, Uruguay, the US, Canada and México. He was a member of the Camerata “Brindis de Salas” in Havana, Cuba from 1987 to 1992, and of the Conjunto de Cámara de La Habana, from 1988 to 1992, and obtained a great national and international promotion for his participation in those ensembles.

In 1992 he arrived in México to participate in the Orquesta Sinfónica de Aguascalientes, serving as concertino in this ensemble for 18 years. He participated regularly as guest concertino in the Orquesta Filarmónica de Zacatecas. Machado was a member of “Solistas de México”, from 1994 to 1995, a group created by Maestro Eduardo Mata, and also collaborated with the Camerata de las Américas from 1995 to 1999. Along with these ensembles, Machado participated in concerts and festivals in Mexico City, as well as in the Festival Internacional Cervantino from Guanajuato, Mexico, from 1994 to 1999.

He recorded with the Quindecim label, along with Horacio Franco and the Camerata Aguascalientes in 1998, and was invited to the “Puebla Instrumenta Verano 2004” as a coordinator of the Festival Symphony Orchestra. Machado was selected in 2004, as an artist in residence at the Banff Centre in Alberta, Canada.

Since 2005, Machado was Artistic Director of the Festival de Música de Cámara de Aguascalientes, a Project that he promoted at a national as well as an international level; and he served also as a concertino of the Orquesta Filarmónica del Estado de Querétaro. He is currently working in the Ensemble of CEPROMUSIC, Centro de Experimentación y Promoción de la Música Contemporánea (Center for Musical Experimentation and Promotion Ensemble) in Mexico City.

== Professor ==
Rafael Machado has served as violin professor at the Music Faculty of the Universidad Autónoma de Zacatecas, at Conservatorio de Música “José Guadalupe Velázquez” in Querétaro, and currently he is a Violin professor of the Universidad de las Artes. Also, he has his own violin academy called "Machado Violin Academy," in Mérida, Yucatán.
