= Tarana (disambiguation) =

Tarana is a type of composition in Indian classical vocal music.

Tarana may also refer to:

== Places ==
- Tarana, New South Wales, a small town in New South Wales
  - Tarana railway station, station on the Main Western line in New South Wales, Australia
- Tarana (house), a heritage-listed residence in Sydney, Australia
- Tarana (Madhya Pradesh), a town in Ujjain district of Madhya Pradesh State in India
  - Tarana Road railway station, small railway station in Ujjain district, Madhya Pradesh
- Tarana, a town in Lower Egypt, site of the ancient city of Terenuthis

== People ==
=== Given name ===
- Tarana Abbasova (born 1967), Azerbaijani female weightlifter
- Tarana Burke, American activist, pioneer of the Me Too movement
- Tarana Halim (born 1966), Bangladeshi politician, former lawyer, television and film actress and playwright
- Tarana Raja, Indian actress, dancer and TV anchor

=== Surname ===
- Emiliano Tarana (born 1979), Italian football player
- Seema Tarana or Sima Tarana, Afghan singer

== Others ==
- Tarana (1951 film), a 1951 Indian film starring Madhubala
- Taraana, a 1979 Hindi film starring Mithun Chakravorty
- Radio Tarana, New Zealand radio network, broadcasting in Auckland, Hamilton and Wellington
- "Tarana" (Ravi Shankar song), a 1976 song by the Indian singer
- "Tarana-e-Milli", or Anthem of the Community, poem in which Allama Mohammad Iqbal paid tribute to the Muslim Ummah (nation) and Muhammad, the prophet of the Muslims
- "Qaumī Tarāna", national anthem of Pakistan
- "Tarana-e-Pakistan, claimed to be the first national anthem that was played in Pakistan's national radio on 14 August 1947

== See also ==
- Taran (disambiguation)
- Taranis (disambiguation)
- Tarhana, Southeast European and Middle Eastern dried food made up of grain, yoghurt or fermented milk
