= Tanarus =

Tanarus may refer to:

- Tanaro River, in north-western Italy - Tanarus in Latin
- Tanarus (beetle), a genus of beetles in the tribe Hyperini
- Tanarus (video game), an online 1997 tank first-person shooter
- Tanarus, another name for the Celtic god of thunder Taranis
- Tanarus, a disguised form of Ulik the Troll, an old enemy of Thor, who attempted to replace/erase his role as the "God of Thunder" after his death at the end of Fear Itself

== See also ==
- Taranis (disambiguation)
