= Țăranu =

Țăranu or Țăran are variants of a Romanian surname literally meaning "peasant". Notable people with the surname include:

- Anatol Țăranu (born 1951), Moldovan politician
- Cătălin Țăranu (born 1973), Romanian go player
- Cornel Țăranu (1934–2023), Romanian composer, musicologist, conductor and cultural manager
- Ion Țăranu (1938–2005), Romanian wrestler
- Iuliana Țăran (born 1995), Romanian sprint canoeist
- Maricica Țăran (born 1962), Romanian rower
- Vladimir Țaranu (born 1982), Moldovan football player

== See also ==
- Taran (name)
- Endoclita taranu, a species of moth
