= Tarun, Iran =

Tarun طارون
- Village
- Location within Iran
- Coordinates: 37°44′03″N 47°52′16″E
- Country: Iran
- Province: East Azerbaijan
- County: Meyaneh
- Bakhsh: Kandovan
- Rural District: Kandovan

Population (2006)
  - Total: 299
- Time zone: UTC+3:30 (IRST)
  - Summer (DST): UTC+4:30 (IRDT)

Tarun (Persian: طارون, also Romanized as Ţārūn and Tārūn; also known as Ţārān and Ţārom) is a village in Kandovan Rural District, Kandovan District, Meyaneh County, East Azerbaijan Province, Iran. At the 2006 census, its population was 299, in 79 families.
