= Tetiana Taran =

Ukrainian computer scientist

Tetiana Arkhipivna Taran (Ukrainian: Тетяна Архипівна Таран, December 4, 1946 – May 17, 2007) was a Soviet and Ukrainian computer scientist who worked in artificial intelligence, published the first Russian-language textbook in artificial intelligence, and founded the series of International Conferences on Data Science and Intelligent Analysis of Information.

== Education and career ==
Taran was born on December 4, 1946, to a military family in Alexandrovsk-Sakhalinsky in the far east of the Soviet Union, and moved as a child to Sevastopol, at the time part of the Ukrainian Soviet Socialist Republic. She studied engineering and mathematics at the Sevastopol Instrument Engineering Institute, now Sevastopol National Technical University, and graduated with honors in 1969.

She did her doctoral studies at the Kyiv Polytechnic Institute, completing her Ph.D. in 1973, and then continued at the Kyiv Polytechnic Institute as a member of the applied mathematics department. She completed a Doctor of Sciences (the Soviet equivalent of a habilitation) in 1999, approved by Dmitriĭ A. Pospelov.

She died on May 17, 2007.

== Contributions ==
Taran was the author of four books and 12 textbooks, including a widely used discrete-mathematics text and a 2006 textbook on artificial intelligence with D. Zubov, the first on the subject in the Russian language.

She founded the International Conference on Data Science and Intelligent Analysis of Information, which began as a workshop in 2001 and became an annual series of international conferences in 2005.
