= Patricia Veryan =

Writer of historical romance fiction (1923–2009)

- Born: Patricia Bannister; November 21, 1923; London, England
- Died: November 18, 2009 (aged 85); Bellevue, Washington
- Writing career
- Pen name: Gwyneth Moore
- Language: English
- Period: 1978–2002
- Genres: Historical Fiction, Romance
- Subjects: Jacobite Rebellion, Regency, Georgian

Patricia Valeria Bannister (November 21, 1923, in London, England – November 18, 2009, in Bellevue, Washington) was a writer of historical romance fiction from 1978 until 2002. She wrote under the names Patricia Veryan and Gwyneth Moore.

Her novels, which were written in English, have been translated into several foreign languages including Italian and German. She is best known for her historical novels set during the Georgian and Regency periods.

== Biography ==
Bannister was an avid reader at a young age and began writing her own stories by the time she was six. Bannister dropped out of school when she was fourteen, worked in a factory in London for some time and finally enrolled in Miss Lodge Secretarial School. Between 1938 and 1940, she was a secretary for the armed forces in London. She worked for Columbia Pictures as a secretary for a two years before working for the U.S. Army in various places in Europe between 1942 and 1946. Bannister met her husband, Allan Louis Berg in Frankfurt and they were married in 1946, moving to California. She and her husband had two children and for several years, Bannister worked as a housewife. In 1971, she returned to working as a secretary for the University of California's department of graduate affairs.

She returned to writing again in 1977, at the urging of a friend. By 1983, her novels had sold millions of copies and she was awarded the a "Silver Loving Cup" by Barbara Cartland for her work. She was also given several Romantic Times awards.

== Works ==
Bannister wrote her first book, The Lord and the Gypsy, while she was working full-time and it was published in 1978. Bannister's books published under the pseudonym Veryan, have been the most critically acclaimed. Publishers Weekly praised her works and called The Riddle of Alabaster Royal (1997), a "Regency that rises farther above the formula than her fine novels usually do." Kirkus Reviews called Never Doubt I Love (1995), one of her best Georgian-period novels. Libraries are recommended to collect her books as part of a core collection of Regency Romances by Kristin Ramsdell in her 2012 "Genreflecting Advisory Series." "Veryan's books are distinguished by well-developed central characters," according to Twentieth-century romance and historical writers, a book which also discusses the suffering undergone by some of her heroes before they can be considered free of past wrongdoing: in, for example, The Lord and the Gypsy and Love Alters Not.

Bibliography

- The Lord and the Gypsy (1978)
- Love's Duet (1979)
- Mistress of Willowvale (1980)
- Nanette (1981)
- Some Brief Folly (1981)
- Feather Castles (1982)
- Married Past Redemption (1983)
- The Noblest Frailty (1983)
- The Wagered Widow (1984)
- Sanguinet's Crown (1985)
- Practice to Deceive (1985)
- Journey to Enchantment (1986)
- The Tyrant (1987)
- Give All to Love (1987)
- Love Alters Not (1988)
- Cherished Enemy (1988)
- The Dedicated Villain (1989)
- Logic of the Heart (1990)
- Time's Fool (1991)
- Had We Never Loved (1992)
- Poor Splendid Wings (1992)
- Ask Me No Questions (1993)
- "Sweet Charlatan" in Autumn Loves (1993)
- A Shadow's Bliss (1994)
- Never Doubt I Love (1995)
- The Mandarin of Mayfair (1995)
- Lanterns (1996)
- The Riddle of Alabaster Royal (1997)
- The Riddle of the Lost Lover (1998)
- The Riddle of the Reluctant Rake (1999)
- The Riddle of the Shipwrecked Spinster (2001)
- The Riddle of the Deplorable Dandy (2002)

As Gwyneth Moore,

- Men Were Deceivers Ever (1989)
- The Dirty Frog (1990)
- Love's Lady Lost (1991)
- "Pride House" in Regency Quartet (1993)
