= Tarn Crag =

Tarn Crag, may refer to a number of hills in the English Lake District:

- Tarn Crag (Easedale), near Grasmere
- Tarn Crag (Far Eastern Fells), near Longsleddale
