= Tyranny (Stabilizers album) =

Studio album by Stabilizers
- Released: December 1, 1986
- Recorded: Conway Studios, Hollywood
- Genre: Pop
- Length: 38:19
- Label: Columbia
- Producer: Denny Diante

Singles from Tyranny
- 1. "One Simple Thing" Released: 1986; 2. "Tyranny" Released: 1986

Tyranny is the debut studio album of the American pop/rock duo Stabilizers, released on Columbia Records in 1986.

== Charts ==
"One Simple Thing" was released as the first single from the album and peaked at No. 21 on the Billboard Mainstream Rock Tracks chart in No. 93 on the Billboard Hot 100 in 1986.

== Track listing ==
"All songs written by Dave Christenson & Rich Nevens.
1986 Still Life Music and Warner-Tamerlane Publishing Corp. (BMI)"

No.	Title	Length
1.	"Tyranny"	4:29
2.	"(If I) Found Rome"	4:38
3.	"I Don't Need the Pain"	4:03
4.	"Now I Hear You"	4:44
5.	"One Simple Thing"	4:07
6.	"Underground"	4:47
7.	"Does Your Love Lie Open?"	4:31
8.	"A Place to Hide"	3:41
9.	"You Pull Me Down"	4:03

== Musicians ==
=== Stabilizers ===
- Dave Christenson – lead vocals
- Rich Nevens – guitars, keyboards, keyboard programming, drum programming, percussion programming on track 5

=== Additional musicians ===
- Robbie Buchanan – keyboards, keyboard programming
- Casey Young – keyboard programming, keyboard solo on track 4
- John "J.R." Robinson – drums (tracks 3, 5, 6, and 7), Drum overdubs (all other tracks, except 8)
- Tom Scott – saxophone
- Nathan East – bass (track 3)
- Neil Stubenhaus – bass (track 5)
