= Alexander Taran =

Russian serial killer

- Born: Alexander Fedorovich Taran; 28 June 1951 (age 75); Alexandrovskoye, Stavropol Krai, RSFSR
- Other names: "The Voroshilov Sharpshooter" "The Stavropol Avenger"
- Conviction: Murder (3 counts)
- Penalty: 23 years imprisonment

Details
- Victims: 3
- Span of crimes: 2003–2004
- Country: Russia
- State: Stavropol Krai
- Date apprehended: 2008

Alexander Fedorovich Taran (Russian: Александр Фёдорович Таран; born 1951), known as The Voroshilov Sharpshooter (Russian: Ворошиловский стрелок), is a Russian beekeeper who committed a series of attempted and accomplished murders in order to avenge the death of his children.

== Biography ==
After his service in the army, Taran began working at a sovkhoz as a zoo technician, fireman and inspector. During the market reforms, he became a beekeeper. He had a house, farm, wife and two children: Natalia (1974–1994) and Vladimir (1977–2001). But in the mid-1990s, his family began to have problems. His daughter Natalia fell in love with a drug addict and soon began taking drugs herself. In June 1994, she was admitted to hospital in a serious condition caused by a drug overdose, where she soon after died. Allegedly, she died from an allergic reaction to an injection given by the doctors. Taran sued the doctor Konoplyankin, who was on duty that day in intensive care (according to some sources, the doctor had long suffered from alcoholism), but Konoplyankin was ultimately justified and pardoned.

Alexander's wife, Nadezhda, went to live and work in Greece a year after Natalia's death. Taran stayed in Russia, focusing his care on his son Vladimir, who had a drinking problem.

In October 2001, Vladimir was killed in a fight at a local disco. Izhayev, the nephew of local entrepreneur Magomed Erkenov, was arrested but later released. No further arrests were made and the case was closed. Taran believed the investigators leading the case were bribed by Erkenov.

=== Revenge ===
Taran purchased two AK-47s while in Mozdok and carried out six attacks.

31 December 2002 Fifteen minutes after the festive Battle of the Bells, Taran opened fire at the windows of Erkenov's house. No one was hurt, and at that time the identity of the shooter remained unknown.

21 May 2003 Taran shot and killed Erkenov at point-blank range at the gate of his own house.

5 September 2003 Taran shot at the windows of the house of the Head Physician of the District Hospital, Sergey Gresev. The doctor survived but was disabled by a shoulder injury.

20 October 2003 Taran killed the senior security officer, Oleg Tanchik (38 years old).

21 June 2004 Taran killed the Police Chief of the Criminal Department of the Aleksandrovsky ATS, Vladimir Shtan.

27 November 2005 Taran fired at a commander of a traffic police platoon named Andrei Radchenko with a machine gun. He was injured but survived. Five months earlier, Radchenko had stopped Taran's Volga, and when he refused to undergo a medical examination, his car was taken to a penalty area.

The investigation took a very long time, as nobody suspected Taran of committing these crimes. Eventually, evidence was discovered by chance. In 2008, one of the villagers from Alexandrovskoye found an AK-47 assault rifle with a homemade silencer wrapped in a bathrobe in the forest. During a walk around the repair shops, one of the local locksmiths identified the silencer and said that it was ordered by Taran, who needed it for a nozzle for a gas burner. Soon after, he was arrested. During a search of his house, a gas pistol was located. Hair belonging to Taran was also found on a machine gun hidden in the forest. A friend of Taran's gave the authorities the second rifle, which he had been storing for Taran. The subsequent examination determined that the 3 murders and 2 attempted murders were committed with these weapons. Initially, Taran confessed to the murders, but refused to cooperate further.

Despite the large amounts of evidence, a jury trial held on 29 May 2009, fully acquitted Taran. The verdict was appealed and protested by the prosecutor's office. On 3 September, the Supreme Court of Russia rejected the verdict and set the case for a new consideration. Taran was given a new trial, and the new jury convicted him. On 9 December, the Stavropol Regional Court sentenced Alexander Taran to 23 years imprisonment. In addition, the court decided that he must pay 1 million and 50 thousand rubles to the family members of the surviving victims for moral damage. Taran did not plead guilty and together with his lawyer, Vyacheslav Savin, tried to appeal the verdict. On 16 March 2010, the sentence was upheld by the Supreme Court of Russia.

== Opinions ==
The case of Alexander Taran caused great resonance throughout Russia. Residents from Alexandrovskoye, where Taran lived until his arrest, expressed mixed feelings towards their fellow villager. Some supported him for attempting retribution, while others condemned him for the bloody mob law. Representatives of the government also responded to the case.

Senator Vladimir Lukin said the following:

I will say right now that I treat negatively such attempts to achieve justice. Although such cases do not surprise me. In a country where there is a negative attitude towards the court, towards justice, where a number of law enforcement officers of fairly high rank are corrupt, many citizens take up arms to restore justice. But this solution to the problem is completely unacceptable. What will happen if each victim starts killing his offenders? Chaos and massacre will begin. And there will be more and more such "Voroshilov Sharpshooters" if the investigation and the courts do not work in strict accordance with the law. The right should work hourly, honestly and vigorously.

Stanislav Govorukhin refused to comment on the Taran case.

According to the lawyer Vyacheslav Savin, there were violations towards his client's rights during the second trial. Some of the evidence against Taran was declared unfit.

The professionalism with which some of the crimes were committed raised doubts about Taran's guilt. For instance, in the case of Erkenov's murder, the killer had previously disabled the surveillance camera near the house and fired a sighting. One of the villagers later said that if Erkenov's relatives were sure of Taran's guilt, they would've already killed him. Oleg Tanchik's mother also expressed her doubts about Alexander's guilt:

Oleg dealt with economic crimes. Gathered dirt on the big district officials. Opened all black bookkeeping where the unaccounted dirt appeared. On Monday, he was supposed to go to Stavropol with a report, and on Sunday he was killed. The hard drive from his computer, where all the data was stored, disappeared.

== See also ==
- Voroshilov Sharpshooter (film)
- List of Russian serial killers
