= Royal Blackheath Golf Club =

Golf club located in London, England

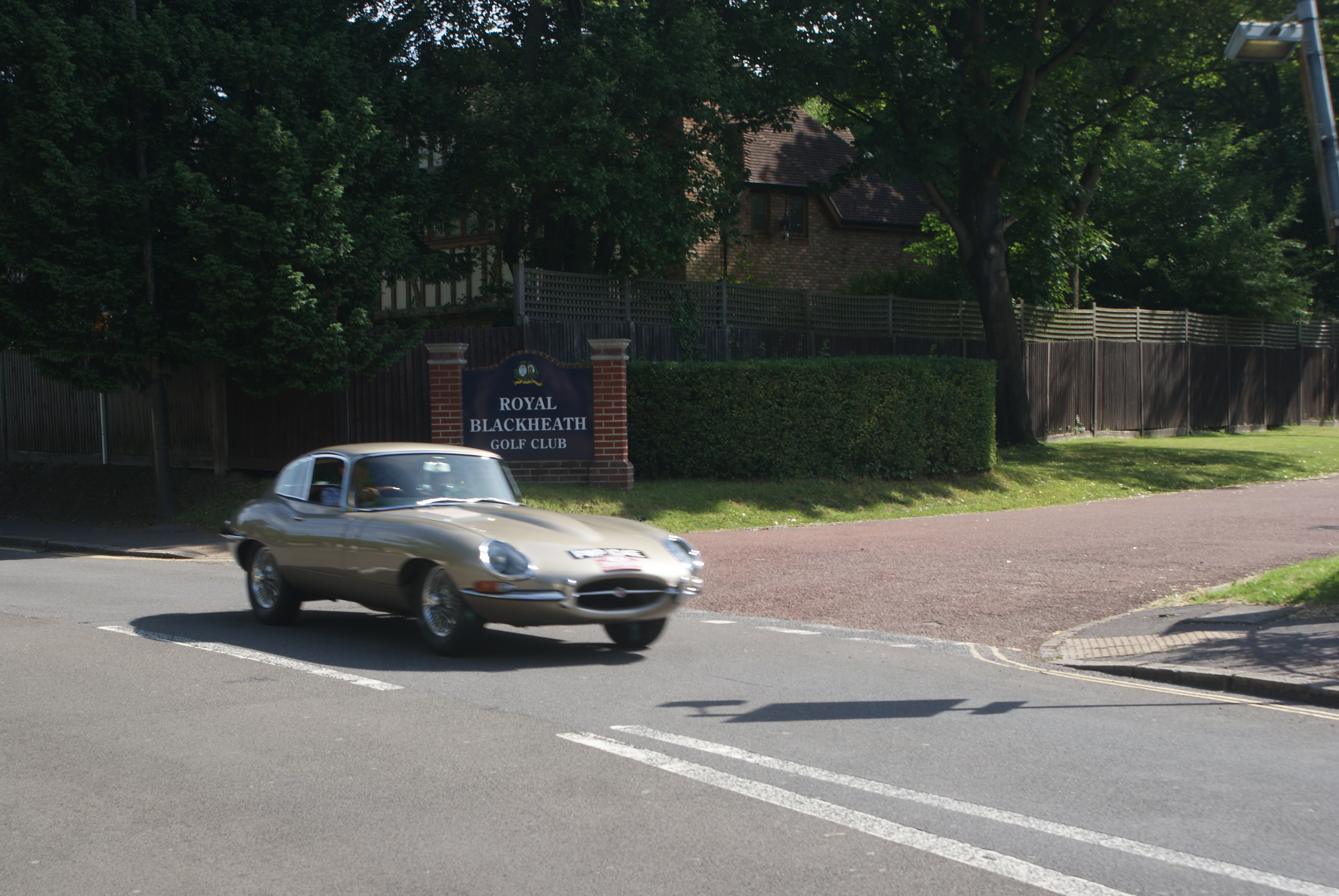
- Entrance to the Royal Blackheath Golf Club
- Interactive map of Royal Blackheath Golf Club
- 51.44558°N 0.05556°E

Club information
- Location: Eltham, Royal Borough of Greenwich, London, England
- Established: 1608
- Type: Private
- Owner: Members
- Total holes: 18
- Greens: Fine fescue
- Website: www.royalblackheath.com

Royal Blackheath Golf Club is a golf club located in Eltham, England within the Royal Borough of Greenwich. It was founded in 1608, making it the oldest golf club in England and the world.

== History ==
There is evidence of golf being played at Blackheath since 1603, soon after the accession of James VI of Scotland to the English throne. The Royal Blackheath Golf Club was formally instituted in 1608, and was originally based in Blackheath. However, many early records were destroyed in a late 18th century fire.

The club was granted royal status during the reign of Queen Victoria in 1857. In 1923, the club moved to its current location in Eltham.

The Royal Blackheath Gold Club joined the Kent Golf Union as a founding member in 1925. The same year, several clubs in Kent, including Royal Blackheath, also formed the Association of South Eastern Golf Clubs. The club has since participated in various competitions administered by these organizations.

== See also ==
- List of golf clubs granted royal status
