= Tyrannus (disambiguation) =

Tyrannus is a genus of large insect-eating birds, commonly known as kingbirds.

- The suffix "-tyrannus" has often been used to describe other animals

Tyrannus may also refer to:

- Tyrannus, an owner of a lecture hall at Ephesus, mentioned in the biblical Acts of the Apostles (19:9)
- Tyrannus (comics), a fictional character who is a supervillain in Marvel Comics' The Incredible Hulk
- Tyrannus, a fictitious gladiator in the 2005 TV series Empire
- Tyrannus, a son of Pterelaus, king of the Taphians, in Greek mythology
- Tyrannus, a 5th-century bishop of Germanicopolis in Isauria, Asia Minor
- Darth Tyranus, a Sith Lord and a former Jedi in the prequel Star Wars trilogies, better known as Count Dooku

== See also ==
- Tyranni
- Tyrannidae
- Tyrant (disambiguation)
- Tyranny (disambiguation)
- Taranis (disambiguation)
