= José White Lafitte =

Cuban violinist and composer (1836 - 1918)

Joseph White
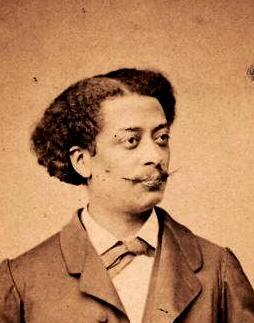
- Born: José Silvestre de los Dolores White Lafitte; January 17, 1836; Matanzas, Cuba
- Died: March 15, 1918 (82); Paris, France
- Occupations: Violinist, Composer
- Known for: 19th-century violin virtuoso and composer
- Parent(s): Don Carlos (Carlos) White; María Escolástica

José Silvestre White Lafitte (17 January 1836 in Matanzas, Cuba – 12-15 March 1918 in Paris, France), also known as Joseph White, was a Cuban-French violinist and composer.

== Biography ==
His father, Don Carlos White, was Spanish and his mother was Afro-Cuban.

After receiving early musical training from his father, who was an amateur violinist, José White gave his first concert in Matanzas on 21 March 1854. He was accompanied by the visiting American pianist-composer Louis Moreau Gottschalk, "who encouraged him to pursue further violin studies in Paris and raised money for him to travel there."

José White studied at the Paris Conservatory, initially with Jean-Delphin Alard, between the years 1855 and 1871, winning the 1856 First Grand Prize. He became a French citizen in 1870.

In 1875, White went to Havana, then to Brazil, where he was director of the Imperial Conservatory in Rio de Janeiro and served as court musician for the Emperor Pedro II until 1889. He then returned to Paris and stayed there for the rest of his life. The 1737 "Swansong" Stradivarius was his instrument. He was highly praised by Rossini.

== Compositions ==
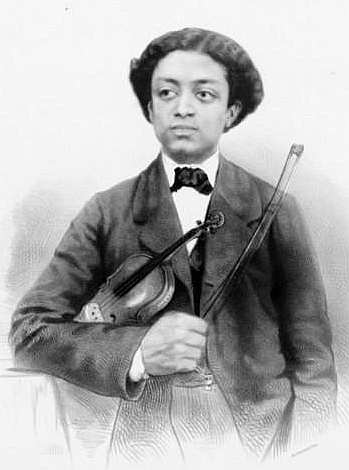
José White in 1856 after receiving the 1st prize for violin at the Conservatoire de Paris

Mainly written for the violin, White's output comprised some 30 works, including a virtuosic Violin Concerto in F♯ Minor, recorded in 1975 by Aaron Rosand and in 1997 by Rachel Barton Pine. Other works include La Bella Cubana (a habanera for two violins and orchestra), La Jota Aragonesa (Op.5), and several sets of violin études, of which Josephine Wright wrote:

"Collectively, these études are striking for their melodic content as well as their technical difficulty, and they give insight into the virtuosic skills of their creator."
