= Alla Taran =

Ukrainian violinist and pedagogue

Alla Taran (Ukraine, February 23, 1941 - September 12, 2017) was a Ukrainian violinist and pedagogue.

== Biography ==
In Ukraine she trained as a violinist and worked as a teacher of Instrumental Ensemble Practice (coordination between instrumentalists in a chamber ensemble). Since 1969 she lived in Cuba.

She was one of the most prestigious violin teachers in Havana. She contributed to the formation of several generations of Cuban musicians, many of whom are outstanding instrumentalists such as Igmar Alderete Acosta (1969-), Yan Carlos Artime Pérez (1971-) and Ilmar López Gavilán (1974-).

== Professional development in Cuba ==
In Cuba she worked as a violin teacher in the music schools of Santa Clara and Cienfuegos provinces, and as assistant concertmaster ( main violinist) of the National Symphony Orchestra in Havana. Since 1978 she resided in Havana, where she developed a relevant work as violin teacher at the National School of Art, the Manuel Saumell Elementary Conservatory of Music, the Amadeo Roldán Conservatory and the Higher Institute of Art.

In 1997 she was a member of the First José White Violin Competition, held in Havana, and of other national competitions in which several of her elementary and middle level students have won prizes. She was a member of the National Violin Technical Commission.

The American journalist of the Washington Post, Eugene Robinson, was in Havana at the beginning of the century researching about the Castro regime for the book "Last Dance in Havana" and had the opportunity to know the pedagogical work of Alla Taran, saying about her:

"In every performance technical resources such as intonation, attack and roundness of sound turned out impeccable. Taran has instilled in these youngsters a strict cult to the sense of dynamics, as well as uniformity in vibrato. There is life, spirit, emotion. One closes one's eyes and imagines the children in the near future as fully mature musicians".

== Children's Symphony Orchestra ==
Taran created the first Children's Symphony Orchestra and the first Violin Ensemble in Cuba. The latter is still active and takes part in numerous cultural activities. She was awarded the Medal of Pedagogical Merit, among other important recognitions. Many of the musicians she trained stand out as violinists in the classical music scene.

== Bibliography ==
- Lliraldi, Aleida: "Cuatro cuerdas de amor en un arco de veinte años", article in Tribuna newspaper (Havana) June 6, 1999, p. 7.
- Radamés Giro: Diccionario enciclopédico de la música en Cuba. Havana: Letras Cubanas, 2009.
- Valdés, Alicia: Con música, textos y presencia de mujer. Havana: Unión, 2005.
