= East Ham (constituency) =

UK Parliament constituency (since 1997)

Coordinates: 51.527°N 0.059°E

- Borough constituency for the House of Commons
- Interactive map of boundaries from 2024
- Boundary within Greater London
- County: Greater London
- Electorate: 70,902 (March 2020)
- Major settlements: East Ham, Manor Park

Current constituency
- Created: 1997
- Member of Parliament: Stephen Timms (Labour)
- Seats: One
- Created from: Newham North East, Newham South

East Ham is a constituency (Note: A borough constituency (for the purposes of election expenses and type of returning officer)) in the London Borough of Newham represented in the House of Commons of the UK Parliament since its creation in 1997 by Stephen Timms of the Labour Party. (Note: As with all constituencies, the constituency elects one Member of Parliament (MP) by the first past the post system of election at least every five years.)

== Constituency profile ==
East Ham is an urban and suburban constituency located in the Borough of Newham in the east of London. It covers the neighbourhoods of East Ham and Little Ilford. Most of the constituency is made up of dense Victorian and Edwardian terraced housing and the population has grown rapidly during the 21st century. The constituency has very high levels of deprivation and house prices are considerably lower than the London average.

In general, residents of the constituency are young and have low levels of education attainment and homeownership. Household incomes fall below the London average, and residens are considerably less likley to hold professional occupations. A majority of the population (59%) were of Asian background at the 2021 census with Bangladeshis forming the largest individual ethnic group. White people were 20% of the population, less than half of whom were of White British background, and Black people were 13%. At the local council, all wards covered by the constituency are represented by Labour Party councillors. In the 2016 Brexit referendum, an estimated 53% of residents voted to remain in the European Union, higher than the nationwide figure but lower than the London average.

== History ==
Predecessor seats and constituent wards

The seat was formed in 1997 when Newham North East and part of Newham South were replaced by the seat.

East Ham's wards have long been Labour strongholds. Ron Leighton (Lab) was MP for the old Newham North East from 1979 until his death in 1994. At the subsequent byelection Stephen Timms was the successful Labour Party candidate.

Summary of results

Timms has represented the seat since its creation in 1997. He has achieved an absolute majority in the eight elections since creation, against a wide assortment of political parties. The Respect Party candidate came second in the 2005 general election (Note: On a −19.95% swing (Lab-Respect)), hoping to benefit from opposition to the Iraq war which saw their first MP elected elsewhere.

At the 2010 general election, Timms received the most votes of any MP (35,471) and largest majority (27,826) of any MP. At the 2015 general election, the seat had the second-highest numerical majority and fourth-highest percentage majority in the country, behind other staunch Labour "safe seats" in Merseyside. These figures were further increased at the 2017 general election (vote 47,124; majority 39,883), but reverted back to 2015 levels at the 2019 election.

In 2024, Timms' vote halved and his majority was cut to 12,863 as he faced a challenge from an independent candidate and a significant increase in support from the Green Party.

== Boundaries ==
Map of boundaries 2010–2024

=== Historic ===
1997–2010: The London Borough of Newham wards of Castle, Central, Greatfield, Kensington, Little Ilford, Manor Park, Monega, St Stephen's, South, and Wall End.

2010–2024: The London Borough of Newham wards of Beckton, Boleyn, East Ham Central, East Ham North, East Ham South, Green Street East, Little Ilford, Manor Park, Royal Docks, and Wall End.

=== Current ===
Further to the completion of the 2023 review of Westminster constituencies, which came into effect for the 2024 general election, the seat was subject to boundary changes, with the Beckton and Royal Docks wards (as they existed on 1 December 2020) being transferred from East Ham to the new constituency of West Ham and Beckton.

Following these changes, as well as reflecting the 2022 local government review, the constituency now comprises the following:

- The London Borough of Newham wards of Boleyn, East Ham, East Ham South, Green Street East, Little Ilford, Manor Park, Plashet, Wall End, and small parts of Forest Gate South and Plaistow North.

The constituency covers north-eastern parts of Newham, including East Ham, Little Ilford, Manor Park and Plashet.

== Members of Parliament ==
Election	Member	Party
1997	Sir Stephen Timms	Labour

== Election results ==
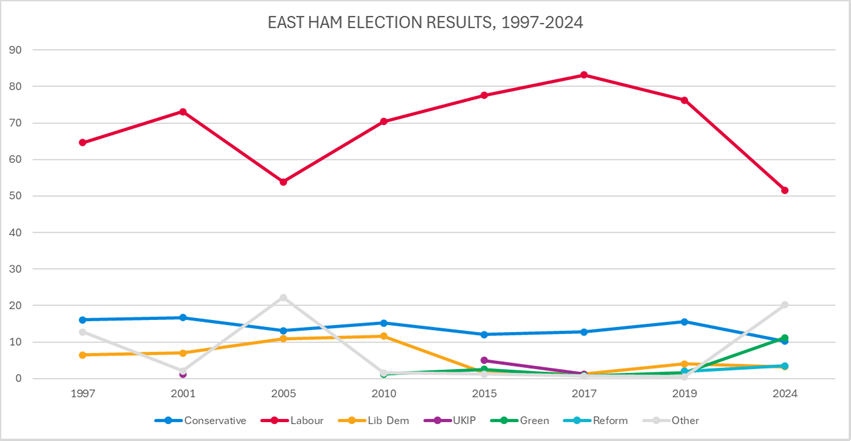
Election results 1997-2024

=== Elections in the 2020s ===
General election 2024: East Ham
Party	Candidate	Votes	%	±%
Labour	Stephen Timms	19,570	51.6	−26.2
Independent	Tahir Mirza	6,707	17.7	N/A
Green	Rosie Pearce	4,226	11.2	+9.6
Conservative	Maria Higson	3,876	10.2	−4.4
Reform	Dan Oxley	1,340	3.5	+1.5
Liberal Democrats	Hillary Briffa	1,210	3.2	−0.4
Independent	Anand Sundar	578	1.5	N/A
Independent	Sathish Ramadoss	385	1.0	N/A
Majority		12,863	33.9	−26.8
Turnout		37,892	47.9	–18.7
Registered electors		79,086		
Labour hold				

=== Elections in the 2010s ===
2019 notional result
Party	Vote	%
Labour	36,748	77.8
Conservative	6,885	14.6
Liberal Democrats	1,685	3.6
Brexit Party	924	2.0
Green	755	1.6
Others	250	0.5
Turnout	47,247	66.6
Electorate	70,902	

General election 2019: East Ham
Party	Candidate	Votes	%	±%
Labour	Stephen Timms	41,703	76.3	−6.9
Conservative	Scott Pattenden	8,527	15.6	+2.8
Liberal Democrats	Michael Fox	2,158	4.0	+2.8
Brexit Party	Alka Sehgal Cuthbert	1,107	2.0	N/A
Green	Michael Spracklin	883	1.6	+0.8
Communities United	Kamran Malik	250	0.5	N/A
Majority		33,176	60.7	−9.7
Turnout		54,628	61.9	−5.6
Registered electors		88,316		
Labour hold		Swing	-4.8	

General election 2017: East Ham
Party	Candidate	Votes	%	±%
Labour	Stephen Timms	47,124	83.2	+5.6
Conservative	Kirsty Finlayson	7,241	12.8	+0.7
UKIP	Daniel Oxley	697	1.2	−3.8
Liberal Democrats	Glanville Williams	656	1.2	−0.4
Green	Chidi Oti-Obihara	474	0.8	−1.7
Friends Party	Choudhry Afzal	311	0.5	N/A
Independent	Mirza Rahman	130	0.2	N/A
Majority		39,883	70.4	+4.9
Turnout		56,633	67.5	+7.7
Registered electors		83,928		
Labour hold		Swing	+2.5	

General election 2015: East Ham
Party	Candidate	Votes	%	±%
Labour	Stephen Timms	40,563	77.6	+7.2
Conservative	Samir Jassal	6,311	12.1	−3.1
UKIP	Daniel Oxley	2,622	5.0	N/A
Green	Tamsin Omond	1,299	2.5	+1.3
Liberal Democrats	David Thorpe	856	1.6	−10.0
Communities United	Mohammed Aslam	409	0.8	N/A
TUSC	Lois Austin	230	0.4	N/A
Majority		34,252	65.5	+10.3
Turnout		52,290	59.8	+4.2
Registered electors		87,382		
Labour hold		Swing	+5.1	

General election 2010: East Ham
Party	Candidate	Votes	%	±%
Labour	Stephen Timms	35,471	70.4	+16.8
Conservative	Paul Shea	7,645	15.2	+1.4
Liberal Democrats	Chris Brice	5,849	11.6	+0.8
English Democrat	Barry O'Connor	822	1.6	N/A
Green	Judy Maciejowska	586	1.2	N/A
Majority		27,826	55.2	+22.0
Turnout		50,373	55.6	+8.0
Registered electors		90,674		
Labour hold		Swing	+7.7	

This was the largest numerical majority of any seat in the 2010 general election.

=== Elections in the 2000s ===
General election 2005: East Ham
Party	Candidate	Votes	%	±%
Labour	Stephen Timms	21,326	53.9	−19.2
Respect	Abdul Mian	8,171	20.7	N/A
Conservative	Sarah Macken	5,196	13.1	−3.6
Liberal Democrats	Ann Haigh	4,296	10.9	+3.9
CPA	David Bamber	580	1.5	N/A
Majority		13,155	33.2	−23.2
Turnout		39.569	50.7	−1.6
Registered electors		78,110		
Labour hold		Swing	−20.0	

General election 2001: East Ham
Party	Candidate	Votes	%	±%
Labour	Stephen Timms	27,241	73.1	+8.5
Conservative	Peter Campbell	6,209	16.7	+0.6
Liberal Democrats	Bridget Fox	2,600	7.0	+0.5
Socialist Labour	Roderick Finlayson	783	2.1	−4.7
UKIP	Johinda Pandhal	444	1.2	N/A
Majority		21,032	56.4	+7.9
Turnout		37,277	52.3	−8.0
Registered electors		71,255		
Labour hold		Swing	+4.0	

=== Elections in the 1990s ===
General election 1997: East Ham
Party	Candidate	Votes	%	±%
Labour	Stephen Timms	25,779	64.6	
Conservative	Angela Bray	6,421	16.1	
Socialist Labour	Imran Khan	2,697	6.8	
Liberal Democrats	Mike J. Sole	2,599	6.5	
BNP	Colin Smith	1,258	3.2	
Referendum	Joy E. McCann	845	2.1	
National Democrats	Graham G. Hardy	290	0.7	
Majority		19,358	48.5	
Turnout		39,889	60.3	
Registered electors		66,111		
Labour win (new seat)				

== See also ==
- List of parliamentary constituencies in London
