= West Ham and Beckton =

UK Parliament constituency (since 2024)

- Borough constituency for the House of Commons
- Interactive map of boundaries from 2024
- Location within Greater London
- County: Greater London
- Electorate: 70,590 (March 2020)

Current constituency
- Created: 2024
- Member of Parliament: James Asser (Labour)
- Seats: One
- Created from: East Ham & West Ham

West Ham and Beckton is a constituency of the House of Commons in the UK Parliament. Further to the completion of the 2023 review of Westminster constituencies, it was first contested at the 2024 general election, since when it has been represented by James Asser of the Labour Party.

== Boundaries ==
Under the Parliamentary Constituencies Order 2023, the constituency is defined as composing the following wards of the London Borough of Newham (as they existed on 1 December 2020):

- Canning Town (North and South), Custom House, Plaistow (North and South) and West Ham from the abolished West Ham constituency.
- Beckton and Royal Docks from East Ham.

Following a local government boundary review which came into effect in May 2022, the constituency now comprises the following wards of the London Borough of Newham from the 2024 general election:

- Beckton; Canning Town North; Canning Town South; Custom House; Plaistow North (most); Plaistow South; Plaistow West and Canning Town East; Royal Albert; Royal Victoria; West Ham; and a very small part of Green Street West.

== Constituency profile ==
The population of Newham has grown significantly in the 21st century, so its represention increased from two seats to three in the 2023 boundary review. This seat includes the extensive low-rise suburbs of West Ham and Plaistow, and dockside areas closer to the Thames, including the Royal Docks, which have undergone regeneration since the 1980s including the completion of newer apartment blocks. The University of East London, Excel Centre, London City Airport and City Hall are in the seat.

== Election results ==
=== Elections in the 2020s ===
2024 general election: West Ham and Beckton
Party	Candidate	Votes	%	±%
Labour	James Asser	16,434	45.2	−25.5
NIP	Sophia Naqvi	7,180	19.8	N/A
Green	Rob Callender	3,897	10.7	+8.2
Conservative	Holly Ramsey	3,781	10.4	−6.0
Reform	Georgie David (Note: Peter Monks was initially named by Reform as a candidate, but was replaced by the time candidates were declared.) (Note: On 2 July 2024, Georgie David stood down as the Reform UK candidate and endorsed the Conservative Party candidate.)	2,800	7.7	+4.9
Liberal Democrats	Emily Bigland	1,606	4.4	−1.7
CPA	Kayode Shedowo	460	1.3	+0.2
TUSC	Lois Austin	190	0.5	N/A
Majority		9,254	25.7	−28.6
Turnout		36,348	46.1	−11.2
Registered electors		78,790		
Labour hold		Swing		

=== Elections in the 2010s ===
2019 notional result
Party	Vote	%
Labour	28,585	70.7
Conservative	6,648	16.4
Liberal Democrats	2,450	6.1
Brexit Party	1,118	2.8
Green	1,023	2.5
Others	606	1.5
Turnout	40,430	57.3
Electorate	70,590	

== See also ==
- List of parliamentary constituencies in London
