= 2022 Newham London Borough Council election =

- 5 May 2022

All 66 seats to Newham London Borough Council
- Registered: 227,154
- Turnout: 65,397; 28.8%
	First party	Second party
Leader	Rokhsana Fiaz	Rob Callender
Party	Labour	Green
Leader since	May 2018
Leader's seat	Directly Elected Mayor
Last election	60 seats, 67.2%	0 seats, 5.2%
Seats before	58	0
Seats won	64	2
Seat change	▲4	▲2
Popular vote	100,535	27,268
Percentage	61.2	16.6
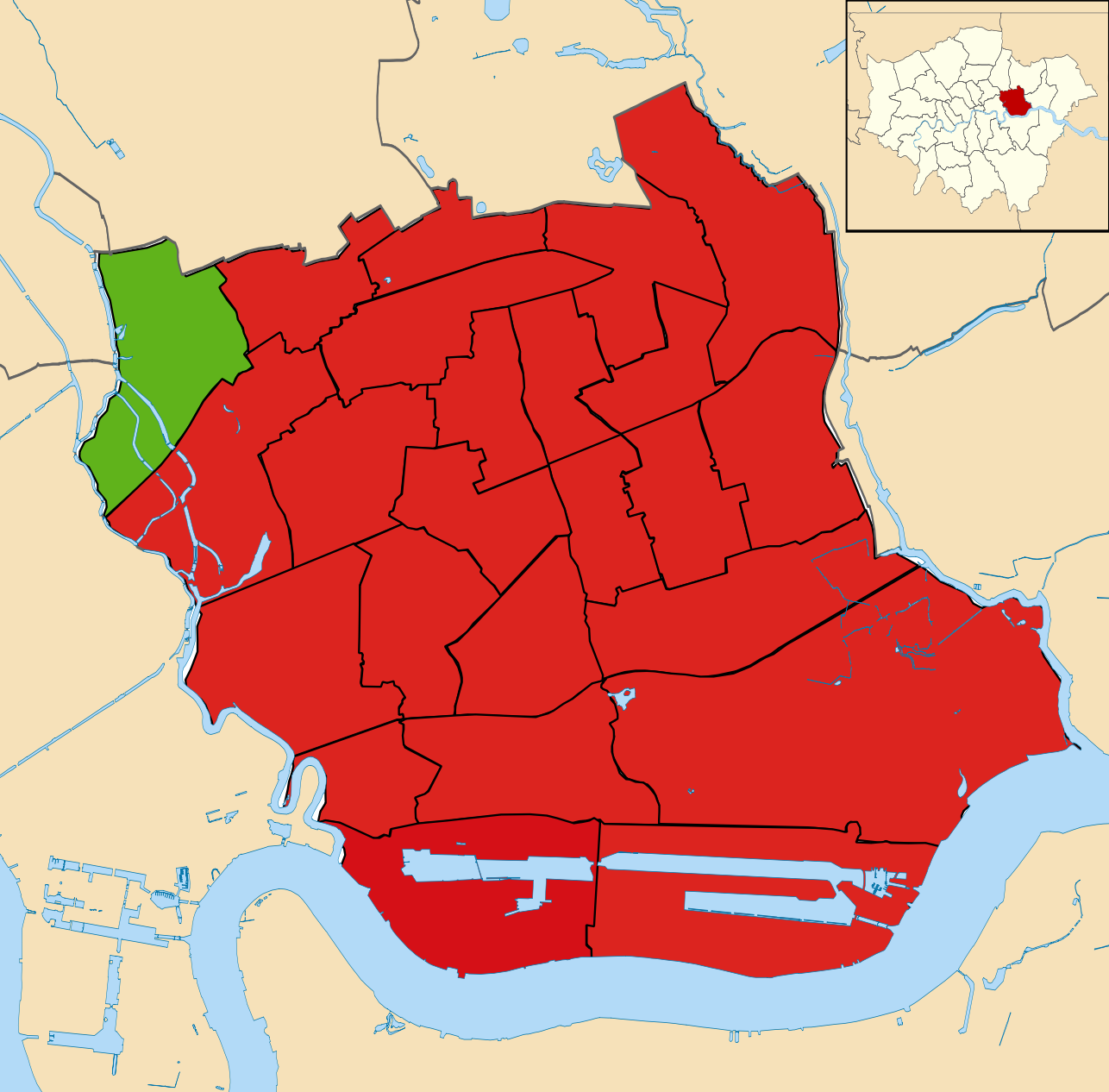
- Map of the results of the 2022 Newham council election. Labour in red & Green Party in green.
council control before election
Labour
Subsequent council control
Labour

The 2022 Newham London Borough Council election took place on 5 May 2022. All 66 members of Newham London Borough Council were elected. The election took place alongside local elections in the other London boroughs and elections to local authorities across the United Kingdom.

In the previous 2018 local election, the Labour Party maintained its control of the council, winning all 60 seats. The 2022 election took place under new election boundaries, which increased the number of councillors to 66. The election coincided with an election for the mayor of Newham after a governance referendum resulted in the borough keeping a directly elected mayor. In the 2022 local election, the Labour Party won all but two seats, which went to the Green Party, for the ward of Stratford Olympic Park.

== Background ==
A total of 253 candidates stood in the election for the 66 seats being contested across 24 wards. Candidates included a full slate from the Labour Party (as had been the case at every election since the borough council had been formed in 1964), and a full slate from the Green Party for the first time. The Conservative Party stood 65 candidates (not a full slate of 66, due to a delayed Election Officer's ruling of an over-subscribed nomination), making it the first time since 2010 they have not stood a full slate. Other candidates who ran were 26 Christian Peoples Alliance, 17 Liberal Democrats, 4 TUSC, 3 Reform UK, and 6 Independents.

=== History ===
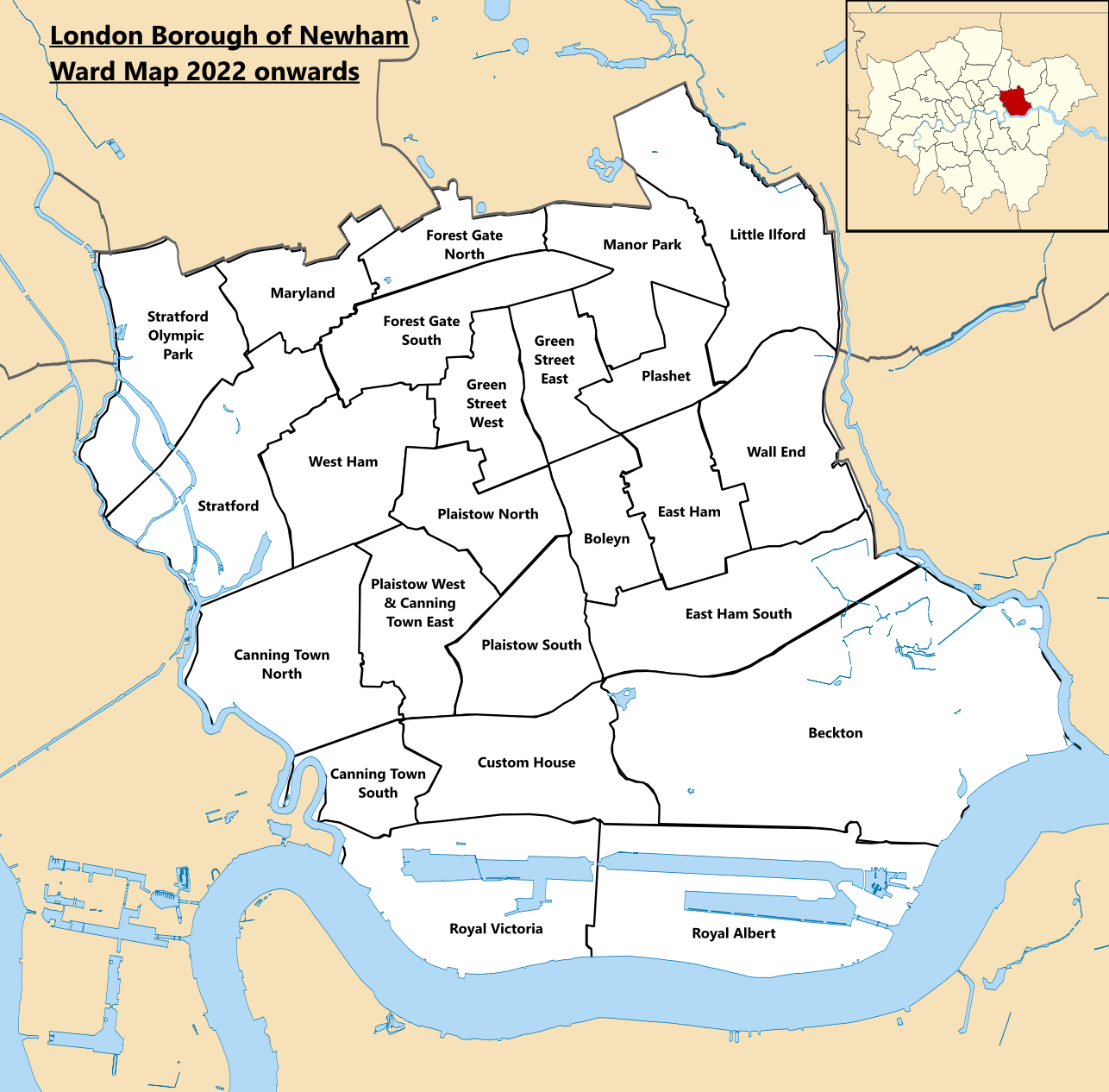
New ward boundaries for the London Borough of Newham 2022

The thirty-two London boroughs were established in 1965 by the London Government Act 1963. They are the principal authorities in Greater London and have responsibilities including education, housing, planning, highways, social services, libraries, recreation, waste, environmental health and revenue collection. Some of the powers are shared with the Greater London Authority, which also manages passenger transport, police and fire.

Newham has been under Labour control since its creation, besides a period of no overall control from 1968 to 1971. In the most recent election in 2018, Labour won all sixty seats with 67.2% of the vote across the borough. The Conservative Party received 15.2% of the vote, the Liberal Democrats received 5.9% of the vote and the Green Party of England and Wales received 5.2% of the vote but none of these won any seats. The Labour candidate Rokhsana Fiaz became mayor of Newham in the concurrent mayoral election, succeeding Robin Wales with 73.4% of the vote in the first round.

=== Council term ===
In September 2018, Veronica Oakeshott, a Labour candidate for Boleyn ward, resigned because she was moving to Oxfordshire. The by-election in November 2018 was won by Moniba Khan, the Labour candidate. In August 2020, Julianne Marriot, a Labour councillor for East Ham Central, resigned for work reasons. Due to the COVID-19 pandemic, a by-election to fill her seat could not be held until 6 May 2021 alongside the 2021 London mayoral election and London Assembly election. The Labour candidate Farah Nazeer was elected, with the Conservative candidate coming in second place.

In July 2020, eighteen councillors submitted a complaint to the Labour Party about the mayor Rokhsana Fiaz, claiming she treated people unfairly, humiliated them and "picked on colleagues". Two councillors also complained that she hadn't dealt with antisemitism in the local party. After she was re-selected as the Labour mayoral candidate, with the party having responded to neither complaint, Pat Murphy and Quintin Peppiatt resigned from the Labour group.

As with most London boroughs, Newham elected its councillors under new boundaries decided by the Local Government Boundary Commission for England, which it produced after a period of consultation. The number of councillors increased from 60 to 66, under new boundaries with eighteen three-councillor wards and six two-councillor wards.

=== Mayoral referendum ===
A referendum was held on 6 May 2021 on whether to retain the mayoral system, where voters elect a mayor every four years, who appoints their own cabinet, or to change to the committee system, where councillors select members of committees and a council leader. The result was to retain the mayoral system, with 56% of voters supporting the status quo.

Choice
Elected mayor
Committee system
Total

== Electoral process ==
Newham, like other London borough councils, elects all of its councillors at once every four years. The previous election took place in 2018. The election took place by multi-member first-past-the-post voting, with each ward being represented by two or three councillors. Electors had as many votes as there are councillors to be elected in their ward, with the top two or three being elected.

All registered electors (British, Irish, Commonwealth and European Union citizens) living in London aged 18 or over were entitled to vote in the election. People who live at two addresses in different councils, such as university students with different term-time and holiday addresses, were entitled to be registered for and vote in elections in both local authorities. Voting in-person at polling stations took place from 7:00 to 22:00 on election day, and voters were able to apply for postal votes or proxy votes in advance of the election.

== Council composition ==
Council composition after the 2018 election

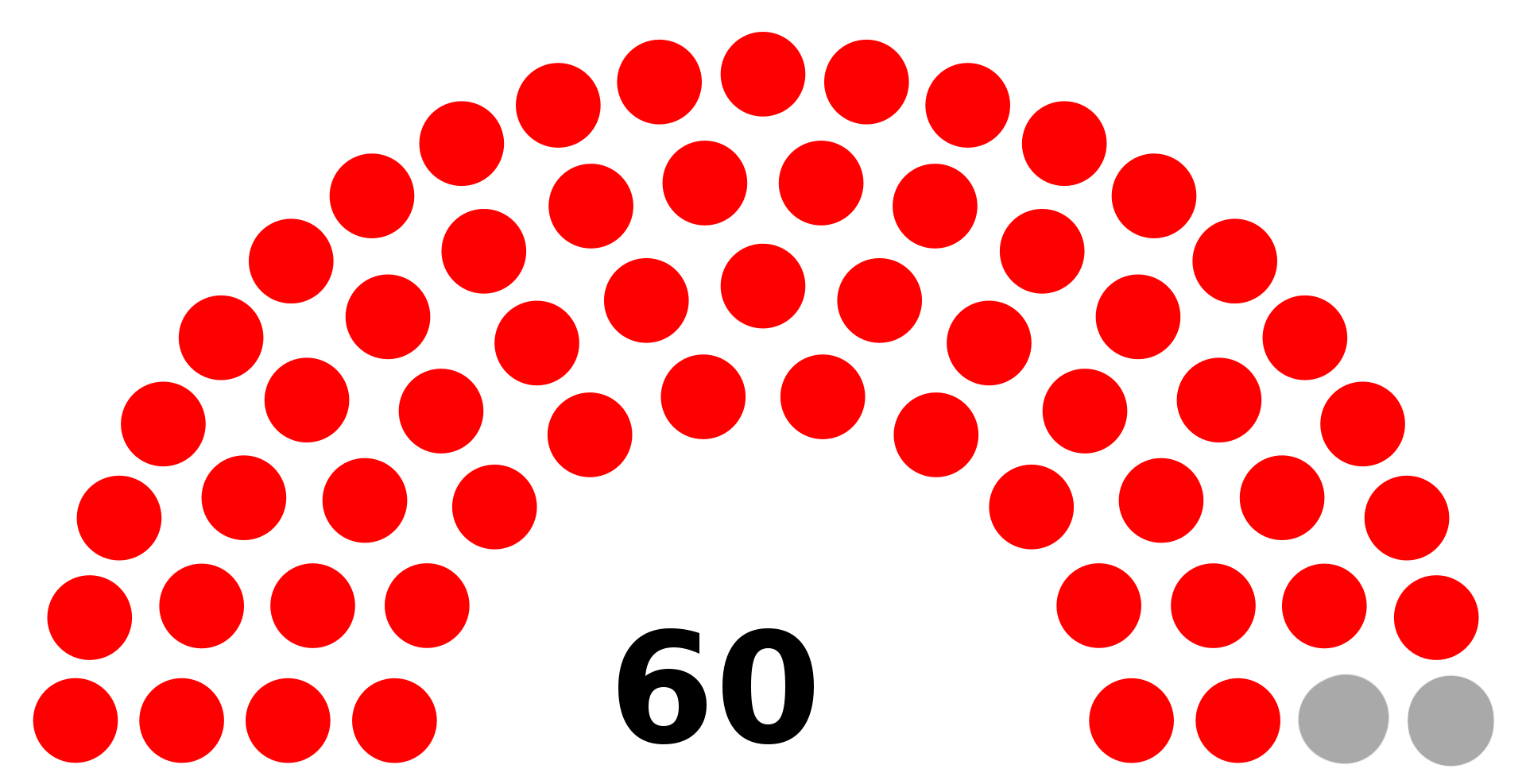
Council composition ahead of the 2022 election

Council composition after the 2022 election

After 2018 election		After 2022 election	
Party	Seats	Party	Seats
Labour	60	Labour	64
		Green	2

== Results summary ==
2022 Newham London Borough Council election
Party	Seats	Gains	Losses	Net gain/loss	Seats %	Votes %	Votes	+/−
Labour	64	0	0	▲4	97.0	61.5	100,535	-5.7
Green	2	0	0	▲2	3.0	16.7	27,268	+11.5
Conservative	0	0	0	Steady	0.0	14.2	23,169	-1.0
Liberal Democrats	0	0	0	Steady	0.0	2.9	4,711	-3.0
CPA	0	0	0	Steady	0.0	2.1	3,397	-1.6
Independent	0	0	0	Steady	0.0	2.0	3,252	+0.7
TUSC	0	0	0	Steady	0.0	0.5	779	-0.3
Reform	0	0	0	Steady	0.0	0.1	244	N/A

== Ward results ==
=== Beckton ===
Beckton (3)
Party	Candidate	Votes	%	±%
Labour	James Asser	1,386	52.9	N/A
Labour	Rohima Rahman	1,263	48.2	N/A
Labour	Tonii Wilson	1,103	42.1	N/A
Green	Alison McLucas	873	33.3	N/A
Green	Karen Webb-Green	826	31.6	N/A
Green	Sol Bourgeon	797	30.4	N/A
Conservative	Abedin Kazi	423	16.2	N/A
Conservative	Victor Aning	400	15.3	N/A
Conservative	Benedetto Litteri	363	13.9	N/A
CPA	Nancy Ameku	182	7.0	N/A
CPA	Phebe Newman	123	4.7	N/A
CPA	June Taylor	115	4.4	N/A
Turnout		2,943	27.8	N/A
Registered electors		10,513		
Labour hold		Swing		
Labour hold		Swing		
Labour hold		Swing		

=== Boleyn ===
Boleyn (3)
Party	Candidate	Votes	%	±%
Labour	Mohammed Gani	1,756	69.8	N/A
Labour	Harvinder Singh Virdee	1,487	59.1	N/A
Labour	Cecilia Welsh	1,450	57.6	N/A
Conservative	Md Nazrul Islam	538	21.4	N/A
Green	Peter Bright	524	20.8	N/A
Green	Helen Lynch	494	19.6	N/A
Conservative	Zillor Mannan	406	16.1	N/A
Green	Roxana-Daniela Toderascu	377	15.0	N/A
Conservative	Lawrencia Durojaiye	367	14.6	N/A
CPA	Earna Gibson	152	6.0	N/A
Turnout		2,953	30.3	N/A
Registered electors		10,513		
Labour hold		Swing		
Labour hold		Swing		
Labour hold		Swing		

=== Canning Town North ===
Canning Town North (3)
Party	Candidate	Votes	%	±%
Labour	Rita Chadha	1,080	63.8	N/A
Labour	Shaban Mohammed	965	57.0	N/A
Labour	Areeq Chowdhury	937	55.3	N/A
Green	Charlotte Hurst	299	17.7	N/A
CPA	Simeon Ademolake	296	17.5	N/A
Green	Cassie Thomas	206	12.2	N/A
Independent	Linda Jordan	199	11.8	N/A
Green	Oscar Lessing	190	11.2	N/A
Conservative	Abiodun Ayeni	183	10.8	N/A
Independent	David Buxton	168	9.9	N/A
Conservative	Md Miah	145	8.6	N/A
CPA	Paul Jobson	143	8.4	N/A
CPA	Flora Amar	138	8.1	N/A
Conservative	Ahmed Faqai	131	7.7	N/A
Turnout		1,888	26.9	N/A
Registered electors		7,023		
Labour hold		Swing		
Labour hold		Swing		
Labour hold		Swing		

=== Canning Town South ===
Canning Town South (3)
Party	Candidate	Votes	%	±%
Labour	Rohit Dasgupta	630	61.1	N/A
Labour	Alan Griffiths	585	56.8	N/A
Labour	Belgica Guana	536	52.0	N/A
Independent	Carel Buxton	187	18.1	N/A
Green	Oliver Reynolds	185	17.9	N/A
Green	Deb Scott	161	15.6	N/A
Independent	Darshi Wijesinghe	155	15.0	N/A
Conservative	Tim Gamble	144	14.0	N/A
Conservative	Marc Pooler	122	11.8	N/A
Green	Benjamin Smith	106	10.3	N/A
Conservative	Rachel Nabudde	103	10.0	N/A
CPA	Myrtle Laing	74	7.2	N/A
CPA	Sharmila Swarna	54	5.2	N/A
CPA	Prossy Namwanje	50	4.9	N/A
Turnout		1,142	22.8	N/A
Registered electors		5,003		
Labour hold		Swing		
Labour hold		Swing		
Labour hold		Swing		

=== Custom House ===
Custom House (3)
Party	Candidate	Votes	%	±%
Labour	James Beckles	1,453	60.2	N/A
Labour	Sarah Ruiz	1,293	53.5	N/A
Labour	Thelma Odoi	1,284	53.2	N/A
Green	Gareth Bannister	422	17.5	N/A
Conservative	Arnold Court	411	17.0	N/A
Conservative	Mizanur Chowdhury	378	15.7	N/A
Green	Sean Labode	361	14.9	N/A
Conservative	Tim Roll-Pickering	326	13.5	N/A
Green	Rupa Sarkar	306	12.7	N/A
Liberal Democrats	Michael Fox	301	12.5	N/A
CPA	Eunice Alamu	259	10.7	N/A
CPA	Idiat Lawal	189	7.8	N/A
CPA	Kayode Shedowo	170	7.0	N/A
Reform	Kay McKenzie	93	3.9	N/A
Turnout		2,691	23.2	N/A
Registered electors		11,579		
Labour hold		Swing		
Labour hold		Swing		
Labour hold		Swing		

=== East Ham ===
East Ham (3)
Party	Candidate	Votes	%	±%
Labour	Imam Haque	1,725	64.0	N/A
Labour	Femi Falola	1,709	63.4	N/A
Labour	Shantu Ferdous	1,693	62.8	N/A
Conservative	Mohammad Faheem	703	26.1	N/A
Conservative	Nadim Miah	571	21.2	N/A
Conservative	Charles Meaby	526	19.5	N/A
Green	Timothy Boxall	446	16.6	N/A
Green	Madeleine Roberts	428	15.9	N/A
Green	Edoardo Toso	283	10.5	N/A
Turnout		3,028	30.8	N/A
Registered electors		9,819		
Labour win (new seat)				
Labour win (new seat)				
Labour win (new seat)				

=== East Ham South ===
East Ham South (3)
Party	Candidate	Votes	%	±%
Labour	Musawwar Alam	2,212	71.6	N/A
Labour	Susan Masters	2,135	69.1	N/A
Labour	Lakmini Shah	1,948	63.0	N/A
Conservative	James Clifford	479	15.5	N/A
Conservative	Manir Khan	460	14.9	N/A
Green	Max Lamptey-Harding	460	14.9	N/A
Conservative	Arthur Harwood	421	13.6	N/A
Green	Alexander McHugh	370	12.0	N/A
Green	Liam Palmer	357	11.6	N/A
TUSC	Steve Hedley	223	7.2	N/A
CPA	Amal Kakumanu	106	3.4	N/A
CPA	Sashir Kakumanu	99	3.2	N/A
Turnout		3,444	30.9	N/A
Registered electors		11,151		
Labour hold		Swing		
Labour hold		Swing		
Labour hold		Swing		

=== Forest Gate North ===
Forest Gate North (2)
Party	Candidate	Votes	%	±%
Labour	Rachel Tripp	1,366	66.1	N/A
Labour	Sasha Das Gupta	1,268	61.4	N/A
Green	Gary Pendlebury	435	21.1	N/A
Green	Michael Spracklin	388	18.8	N/A
Conservative	Fokoruddin Ahmed	284	13.7	N/A
Liberal Democrats	Philip Reynolds	201	9.7	N/A
Conservative	Ellis Hudson	189	9.2	N/A
Turnout		2,373	32.7	N/A
Registered electors		7,246		
Labour hold		Swing		
Labour hold		Swing		

=== Forest Gate South ===
Forest Gate South (3)
Party	Candidate	Votes	%	±%
Labour	Anamul Islam	1,837	68.7	N/A
Labour	Madeleine Pontin	1,749	65.4	N/A
Labour	Winston Vaughan	1,491	55.7	N/A
Green	Emma Sorrell	559	20.9	N/A
Green	Kieren Jones	554	20.7	N/A
Green	Benjamin Beeler	501	18.7	N/A
Conservative	Akmol Hussain	423	15.8	N/A
Conservative	Olenka Gradosielska	331	12.4	N/A
Liberal Democrats	David Terrar	319	11.9	N/A
Conservative	Nikolay Kolchev	263	9.8	N/A
Turnout		3,126	27.5	N/A
Registered electors		11,381		
Labour hold		Swing		
Labour hold		Swing		
Labour hold		Swing		

=== Green Street East ===
Green Street East (3)
Party	Candidate	Votes	%	±%
Labour	Miraj Patel	2,347	77.6	N/A
Labour	Muzibur Rahman	2,151	71.1	N/A
Labour	Larisa Zilickaja	1,721	56.9	N/A
Conservative	Nilesh Patel	518	17.1	N/A
Conservative	Kirankumar Patel	510	16.9	N/A
Green	Tassaduqq Cheema	480	15.9	N/A
Conservative	Khatija Meaby	406	13.4	N/A
Green	Joseph Hudson-Small	400	13.2	N/A
Green	Rose Waddilove	360	11.9	N/A
TUSC	Lois Austin	185	6.1	N/A
Turnout		3,541	34.7	N/A
Registered electors		10,265		
Labour hold		Swing		
Labour hold		Swing		
Labour hold		Swing		

=== Green Street West ===
Green Street West (3)
Party	Candidate	Votes	%	±%
Labour	Lewis Godfrey	1,876	72.8	N/A
Labour	Mumtaz Khan	1,868	72.5	N/A
Labour	Amar Virdee	1,722	66.9	N/A
Conservative	Shahzad Iqbal	470	18.3	N/A
Green	Ronald Harris	427	16.6	N/A
Conservative	Ravindra Nandivelugu	388	15.1	N/A
Green	Adam Mitchell	363	14.1	N/A
Conservative	Samson Osagiede	309	12.0	N/A
Green	Joseph Sorrell-Roberts	303	11.8	N/A
Turnout		2,987	32.9	N/A
Registered electors		11,539		
Labour hold		Swing		
Labour hold		Swing		
Labour hold		Swing		

=== Little Ilford ===
Little Ilford (3)
Party	Candidate	Votes	%	±%
Labour	Syed Bashar	2,200	63.7	N/A
Labour	Nur Begum	2,159	62.5	N/A
Labour	Elizabeth Booker	2,089	60.5	N/A
Independent	Tahir Mirza	667	19.3	N/A
Liberal Democrats	Mahibur Akm	512	14.8	N/A
Conservative	Mufid Asm	512	14.8	N/A
Liberal Democrats	Mujeeb Rehman	384	11.1	N/A
Conservative	Bishwajit Bal	373	10.8	N/A
Conservative	Mary Antwi	356	10.3	N/A
Green	Amy Wilson	301	8.7	N/A
Green	Terrence Stamp	291	8.4	N/A
Green	Waleed Zuoriki	150	4.3	N/A
CPA	Deirdre Pask	130	3.8	N/A
CPA	Peter Murengera	123	3.6	N/A
CPA	James Pask	120	3.5	N/A
Turnout		3,796	32.9	N/A
Registered electors		11,539		
Labour hold		Swing		
Labour hold		Swing		
Labour hold		Swing		

=== Manor Park ===
Manor Park (3)
Party	Candidate	Votes	%	±%
Labour	Mariam Dawood	2,271	73.9	N/A
Labour	Salim Patel	2,177	70.8	N/A
Labour	Jennifer Bailey	2,155	70.1	N/A
Conservative	Rajan Miah	508	16.5	N/A
Conservative	Md Saymon	427	13.9	N/A
Green	Jenny Duval	393	12.8	N/A
Green	Rosalind Bedlow	369	12.0	N/A
Conservative	Silvia Troanta	366	11.9	N/A
Green	Deyan Atanasov	308	10.0	N/A
Liberal Democrats	Derek Jackson	245	8.0	N/A
Turnout		3,384	33.0	N/A
Registered electors		10,247		
Labour hold		Swing		
Labour hold		Swing		
Labour hold		Swing		

=== Maryland ===
Maryland (2)
Party	Candidate	Votes	%	±%
Labour	Carolyn Corben	1,484	67.6	N/A
Labour	Ken Penton	1,330	60.6	N/A
Green	Chris Brooks	396	18.0	N/A
Green	Vinali Ainsley	366	16.7	N/A
Liberal Democrats	Karina Celis Rangel	242	11.0	N/A
Conservative	Freddie Downing	234	10.7	N/A
Conservative	Brian Maze	220	10.0	N/A
TUSC	Ferdy Lyons	117	5.3	N/A
Turnout		2,252	27.0	N/A
Registered electors		8,296		
Labour win (new seat)				
Labour win (new seat)				

=== Plaistow North ===
Plaistow North (3)
Party	Candidate	Votes	%	±%
Labour	Zulfiqar Ali	2,151	71.6	N/A
Labour	Joy Laguda	2,022	67.3	N/A
Labour	Daniel Lee-Phakoe	1,936	64.4	N/A
Green	Elsa Malki	560	18.6	N/A
Conservative	John Flesher	523	17.4	N/A
Conservative	Mufti Islam	522	17.4	N/A
Green	Francis Moore	518	17.2	N/A
Conservative	Saverimuthu Mariadas	390	13.0	N/A
Green	Aki Turan	390	13.0	N/A
Turnout		3,063	28.4	N/A
Registered electors		10,791		
Labour hold		Swing		
Labour hold		Swing		
Labour hold		Swing		

=== Plaistow South ===
Plaistow South (3)
Party	Candidate	Votes	%	±%
Labour	Neil Wilson	1,360	64.2	N/A
Labour	Jane Lofthouse	1,292	61.0	N/A
Labour	Carlene Lee-Phakoe	1,284	60.6	N/A
Conservative	Murad Chowdhury	430	20.3	N/A
Green	Nicholas Dowden	390	18.4	N/A
Conservative	Roy Miah	345	16.3	N/A
Green	Iain McKeil	334	15.8	N/A
Green	Anca-Elena Zaman	328	15.5	N/A
Conservative	Dhiman Das	311	14.7	N/A
Liberal Democrats	Sheree Miller	279	13.2	N/A
Turnout		2,430	28.3	N/A
Registered electors		8,564		
Labour hold		Swing		
Labour hold		Swing		
Labour hold		Swing		

=== Plaistow West & Canning Town East ===
Plaistow West & Canning Town East (3)
Party	Candidate	Votes	%	±%
Labour	Dina Hossain	1,654	64.6	N/A
Labour	John Morris	1,578	61.7	N/A
Labour	Simon Rush	1,475	57.6	N/A
Conservative	Tom Barber	399	15.6	N/A
Green	Jacintha Christopher	367	14.3	N/A
Conservative	Aimee Alado	344	13.4	N/A
Green	Peter Whittle	335	13.1	N/A
Green	Christopher Slevin	293	11.4	N/A
Liberal Democrats	Robert Briggs	288	11.3	N/A
TUSC	Nicola Barratt	254	9.9	N/A
Conservative	Adeola Odutola	246	9.6	N/A
CPA	John Falana	167	6.5	N/A
CPA	Shoyemi Shoyemi	153	6.0	N/A
CPA	Ugochi Nwogwugwu	124	4.8	N/A
Turnout		2,606	35.1	N/A
Registered electors		7,424		
Labour win (new seat)				
Labour win (new seat)				
Labour win (new seat)				

=== Plashet ===
Plashet (2)
Party	Candidate	Votes	%	±%
Labour	Zuber Gulamussen	1,378	62.3	N/A
Labour	Pushpa Makwana	1,115	50.4	N/A
Independent	Mehmood Mirza	919	41.6	N/A
Conservative	Attic Rahman	544	24.6	N/A
Green	Stephen Charles	256	11.6	N/A
Green	Josh Robinson	210	9.5	N/A
Turnout		2,606	35.1	N/A
Registered electors		7,424		
Labour win (new seat)				
Labour win (new seat)				

=== Royal Albert ===
Royal Albert (2)
Party	Candidate	Votes	%	±%
Labour	Ann Easter	849	65.6	N/A
Labour	Tony McAlmont	692	53.5	N/A
Green	Jane Lithgow	227	17.5	N/A
Conservative	Douglas Coleman	217	16.8	N/A
Conservative	Maurisa Coleman	177	13.7	N/A
Green	Daniel Rodrigues	162	12.5	N/A
Liberal Democrats	James Jones	118	9.1	N/A
Liberal Democrats	Callum Littlemore	99	7.6	N/A
Reform	Daniel Oxley	48	3.7	N/A
Turnout		1,509	21.4	N/A
Registered electors		7,042		
Labour win (new seat)				
Labour win (new seat)				

=== Royal Victoria ===
Royal Victoria (2)
Party	Candidate	Votes	%	±%
Labour	Steve Brayshaw	856	48.4	N/A
Labour	Caroline Adaja	833	47.1	N/A
Green	Rob Callender	389	22.0	N/A
Green	Gloria Goncalves	368	20.8	N/A
Conservative	Mark Seymour	341	19.3	N/A
Conservative	Joshua Darren Lindl	324	18.3	N/A
Liberal Democrats	Breanna Frances Kolada	229	12.9	N/A
Liberal Democrats	James Raymond	199	11.2	N/A
Turnout		1,921	20.1	N/A
Registered electors		9,642		
Labour win (new seat)				
Labour win (new seat)				

=== Stratford ===
Stratford (3)
Party	Candidate	Votes	%	±%
Labour	Joshua Garfield	1,280	59.1	N/A
Labour	Sabia Kamali	1,265	58.4	N/A
Labour	Terry Paul	1,169	54.0	N/A
Green	Ed Furst	501	23.1	N/A
Green	Moira Lascelles	481	22.2	N/A
Green	Pau Jimenez Ingles	437	20.2	N/A
Liberal Democrats	Hillary Briffa	364	16.8	N/A
Liberal Democrats	Samie Dorgham	279	12.9	N/A
Conservative	Reece Chana	261	12.1	N/A
Conservative	John Oxley	246	11.4	N/A
Conservative	Raja Shokat	210	9.7	N/A
Turnout		2,385	22.8	N/A
Registered electors		10,454		
Labour win (new seat)				
Labour win (new seat)				
Labour win (new seat)				

=== Stratford Olympic Park ===
Stratford Olympic Park (2)
Party	Candidate	Votes	%	±%
Green	Nate Higgins	1,394	55.8	N/A
Green	Danny Keeling	1,186	47.5	N/A
Liberal Democrats	Dr. Saleyha Ashsan	274	11.0	N/A
Liberal Democrats	James Alan Rumsby	198	7.9	N/A
Conservative	Ryan Baldry	122	4.9	N/A
Conservative	Andrius Kavaliauskas	89	3.6	N/A
CPA	David Yusuff Ilori	25	1.0	N/A
CPA	Esther Smith	25	1.0	N/A
Turnout		2,632	33.9	N/A
Registered electors		7,750		
Green win (new seat)				
Green win (new seat)				

Nareser Osei was the only Labour councillor to not be re-elected after previously serving Stratford and New Town ward from 2018 to 2022.

=== Wall End ===
Wall End (3)
Party	Candidate	Votes	%	±%
Labour	Luke Charters	2,118	64.1	N/A
Labour	Lester Hudson	1,929	58.3	N/A
Labour	Jemima McAlmont	1,882	56.9	N/A
Independent	Swarup Chowdhury	957	28.9	N/A
Conservative	Saiduz Zaman	648	19.6	N/A
Conservative	Olugbenga Ajibade	461	13.9	N/A
Conservative	Jim Smith	412	12.5	N/A
Green	Melanie Bax	392	11.9	N/A
Green	Matthew Savage	336	10.2	N/A
Green	James Buttress	300	9.1	N/A
CPA	Victoria Bapu	142	4.3	N/A
CPA	Shyam Sunder	139	4.2	N/A
Reform	David Sandground	103	3.1	N/A
CPA	Bharath Swamy	99	3.0	N/A
Turnout		3,765	35.0	N/A
Registered electors		10,756		
Labour hold		Swing		
Labour hold		Swing		
Labour hold		Swing		

=== West Ham ===
West Ham (3)
Party	Candidate	Votes	%	±%
Labour	John Gray	1,758	72.0	N/A
Labour	Charlene McLean	1,626	66.6	N/A
Labour	John Whitworth	1,458	59.7	N/A
Green	Clare Hardy	558	22.9	N/A
Green	Lyubo Ivanov	372	15.2	N/A
Green	Ben Parker	369	15.1	N/A
Conservative	Armyn Hennessy	319	13.1	N/A
Conservative	Nirali Patel	309	12.7	N/A
Conservative	Malcolm Madden	292	12.0	N/A
Liberal Democrats	Alexander Tuppen	260	10.7	N/A
Turnout		2,718	26.8	−7.0
Registered electors		10,122		
Labour hold		Swing		
Labour hold		Swing		
Labour hold		Swing		

== Changes 2022–2026 ==
- In 2022, Labour suspended Canning Town South councillor Belgica Guaña, who subsequently sat as an independent.
- In November 2023, Plashet councillor Zuber Gulamussen left Labour to sit as an independent and joined the Newham Independents group.
- The Newham Independents Party was registered on 3 June 2024. Mehmood Mirza, Sophia Naqvi and Gulamussen formed its group on the council.
- In July 2024, Canning Town North councillor Areeq Chowdhury left Labour and joined the Green Party.
- In May 2025, Green Street West councillor Lewis Godfrey left Labour to sit as an independent.
- In November 2025, Little Ilford councillor Nur Begum left Labour and joined the Newham Independents Party. She left the party in January 2026 and sat as an independent.

=== By-elections ===
==== Boleyn ====
The by-election followed the resignation of Labour councillor Cecilia Welsh for family reasons.

Boleyn by-election, 13 July 2023
Party	Candidate	Votes	%	±%
Independent	Mehmood Mirza	1,153	42.5	N/A
Labour	Sofia Patel	871	32.1	−27.0
Green	Joe Hudson-Small	572	21.1	+3.5
Conservative	Lawrencia Durojaiye	69	2.5	−15.6
Reform	Daniel Oxley	23	0.8	N/A
Liberal Democrats	David Terrar	22	0.8	N/A
Majority		282	10.4	N/A
Turnout		2,729	27.7	−2.6
Registered electors		9,866		
Independent gain from Labour				

==== Wall End ====
The by-election followed the resignation of Labour councillor Luke Charters, who stood down to concentrate on seeking election to Parliament.

Wall End by-election, 13 July 2023
Party	Candidate	Votes	%	±%
Labour	Stephanie Garfield	1,659	61.1	+12.5
Conservative	Durai Kannan	739	27.2	−12.3
Liberal Democrats	Claire Pattie	138	5.1	N/A
Green	Tassadduq Cheema	123	4.5	−4.5
Reform	David Sandground	58	2.1	−0.2
Majority		920	33.9	N/A
Turnout		2,733	25.1	−9.9
Registered electors		10,900		
Labour hold		Swing	+0.1	

==== Plaistow North ====
The by-election followed the resignation of Labour councillor Daniel Lee-Phakoe for personal reasons.

Plaistow North by-election, 23 November 2023
Party	Candidate	Votes	%	±%
Independent	Sophia Naqvi	1,266	46.3	N/A
Labour	Aktharul Alam	750	27.4	−46.3
Independent	Anasur Khan	274	10.0	N/A
Conservative	James Clifford	257	9.4	−6.8
Green	Zahra Kheyre	113	4.1	−13.2
Liberal Democrats	Graham Terrar	73	2.7	N/A
Majority		516	18.9	N/A
Turnout		2,744	25.2	−3.2
Registered electors		10,905		
Independent gain from Labour		Swing		

==== Forest Gate North ====
The by-election followed the resignation of Labour councillor Sasha Das Gupta.

Forest Gate North by-election, 4 July 2024
Party	Candidate	Votes	%	±%
Labour	Liz Cronin	1,757	43.0	−16.8
NIP	Zakaria Bhariwala	1,073	26.3	N/A
Green	Zahra Kheyre	810	19.8	+1.8
Conservative	Malcolm Madden	251	6.1	−6.3
Liberal Democrats	Jamie Bryant	192	4.7	−4.1
Majority		684	16.7	N/A
Turnout		4,119	53.4	+20.7
Labour hold				

==== Maryland ====
The by-election followed the resignation of Labour councillor Ken Penton.

Maryland by-election, 4 July 2024
Party	Candidate	Votes	%	±%
Labour	Melanie Onovo	1,626	43.0	−17.0
NIP	Linda Jordan	896	23.7	N/A
Green	Chris Brooks	712	18.8	+2.8
Conservative	Mary Antwi	360	9.5	−0.1
Liberal Democrats	David Terrar	185	4.9	−4.9
Majority		730	19.3	N/A
Rejected ballots		39	1.0	
Turnout		3,818	42.1	+15.1
Registered electors		9,067		
Labour hold				

==== Beckton ====
The by-election followed the resignation of Labour councillor James Asser after his selection as Labour's parliamentary candidate for West Ham and Beckton.

Beckton by-election, 18 July 2024
Party	Candidate	Votes	%	±%
Labour	Blossom Young	597	38.7	−9.7
NIP	Shahzad Abbasi	476	30.9	N/A
Green	Justine Levoir	228	14.8	−15.7
Conservative	Maria Clifford	144	9.3	−5.5
Liberal Democrats	James Alan-Rumsby	96	6.2	N/A
Majority		121	7.8	N/A
Turnout		1,552	13.6	−14.2
Registered electors		11,456		
Labour hold				

==== Little Ilford ====
The by-election followed the resignation of Labour councillor Elizabeth Booker.

Little Ilford by-election, 18 July 2024
Party	Candidate	Votes	%	±%
Labour	Aktharul Alam	884	39.0	−21.9
NIP	Tahir Mirza	738	32.6	N/A
Liberal Democrats	Akm Mahibur Rahman	274	12.1	+0.3
Independent	Vijay Parthiban	163	7.2	N/A
Conservative	Mohamadu Faheem	104	4.6	−7.2
Green	Joe Oteng	103	4.5	−2.5
Majority		146	6.4	N/A
Turnout		2,277	18.3	−14.6
Registered electors		12,443		
Labour hold				

==== Plaistow South ====
The by-election followed the death of Labour councillor Neil Wilson.

Plaistow South by-election, 18 September 2025
Party	Candidate	Votes	%	±%
NIP	Md Nazrul Islam	913	44.7	N/A
Labour	Asheem Singh	436	21.3	−42.9
Reform	Lazar Monu	329	16.1	N/A
Green	Nic Motte	152	7.4	−10.9
Conservative	Rois Miah	123	6.0	−14.1
Liberal Democrats	Sheree Miller	90	4.4	−8.6
Majority		477	23.3	N/A
Turnout		2,059	23.1	−5.2
Registered electors		8,926		
NIP gain from Labour		Swing		
