= Custom House, Newham =

Area in London, England

Coordinates: 51.5076°N 0.0297°E

Custom House
- Location within Greater London
- Population: 9,600
- OS grid reference: TQ408807
- London borough: Newham
- Ceremonial county: Greater London
- Region: London
- Country: England
- Sovereign state: United Kingdom
- Post town: LONDON
- Postcode district: E16
- Dialling code: 020
- Police: Metropolitan
- Fire: London
- Ambulance: London
- UK Parliament: West Ham and Beckton
- London Assembly: City and East

Custom House is an area in the London Borough of Newham, in East London, England.

The area is named after the custom house of Royal Victoria Dock. Today the dock is used for recreation but, in the past, it dominated the industry and commerce of the area from 1855 until the 1940s before closing in 1980. The main economic building of the area is the ExCeL London Exhibition Centre and the district is connected to the City of London by the Docklands Light Railway and the Elizabeth line. Offices, factories and storage premises close to the DLR route provide most of the area's employment land. Schools, a college, a care home, council offices and a parade of shops also support the local economy, which has parks to north and south-east.

It was originally part of the ancient parish and County Borough of West Ham, in the hundred of Becontree, a part of the historic county of Essex. Since 1965, Custom House has been part of the London Borough of Newham, a local government district of Greater London. It forms part of the London E16 postcode district.

Custom House has often been regarded as the eastern part of Canning Town, also a part of West Ham; however this link has tended to be downplayed since the Victorian period due to Canning Town’s poor, industrial character.

== History ==
Historically, the area was in the extreme west of Essex and, along with Canning Town and Silvertown, formed the south of the parish of West Ham, a largely rural parish until the early 19th century. Trade expanded in the British Empire and the royal docks were built, connecting to the River Thames in this district. Custom House took its name from the Custom House of the Royal Victoria Dock, opened in 1855. The demand for trade brought rapid population expansion, chiefly the families of dockworkers, warehousemen, carters (distributors), packaging and semi-skilled manufacturing hands, building and utilities workmen and workers in London's street and general distribution markets.

About 1740 the number of householders was estimated at 570. In the first national census of 1801 the population of West Ham was 6,485. It rose steadily to 12,738 in 1841 and then began a growth, which was especially rapid between 1871 and 1901, when over 204,000 were added. By 1911, with 289,030 inhabitants, West Ham was seventh in size among English county boroughs, a status newly acquired. The new population were crowded within the boundaries of the ancient parish being in limited height of homes then affordable to most people. Unlike in the various wealthy streets of other London districts almost the whole population of this part of what was Canning Town consisted of low-paid workers who lived in cheap, unadorned brick and mortar low rise terraces. There was a chronic shortage of open land which only became available once again when the cost of sound mid-rise and high-rise buildings became lower. High rise was first adopted in the country as social housing, attaching a stigma to tower blocks, many of which have since been demolished, including the few in this district of what was West Ham or Canning Town.

A slight population decline to 1931 paled into insignificance by the devastation wrought on this area in World War II, when bombing destroyed in many cases entire streets and forced large-scale evacuation.

The area is marked in early 20th century maps as the eastern half of Canning Town. The first Custom House in London was built in 1275 next to Old Billingsgate Market in the City of London several miles to the west. Royal Victoria Dock which was the economic hub of the settlement is today in recreational use but it dominated the industry and commerce of the area from its 1855 opening until the 1940s and closed in 1980 due to containerisation of freight.

== Governance ==
Custom House is part of the West Ham and Beckton constituency for elections to the House of Commons of the United Kingdom.

Custom House is part of the Custom House ward for elections to Newham London Borough Council.

== Amenities ==
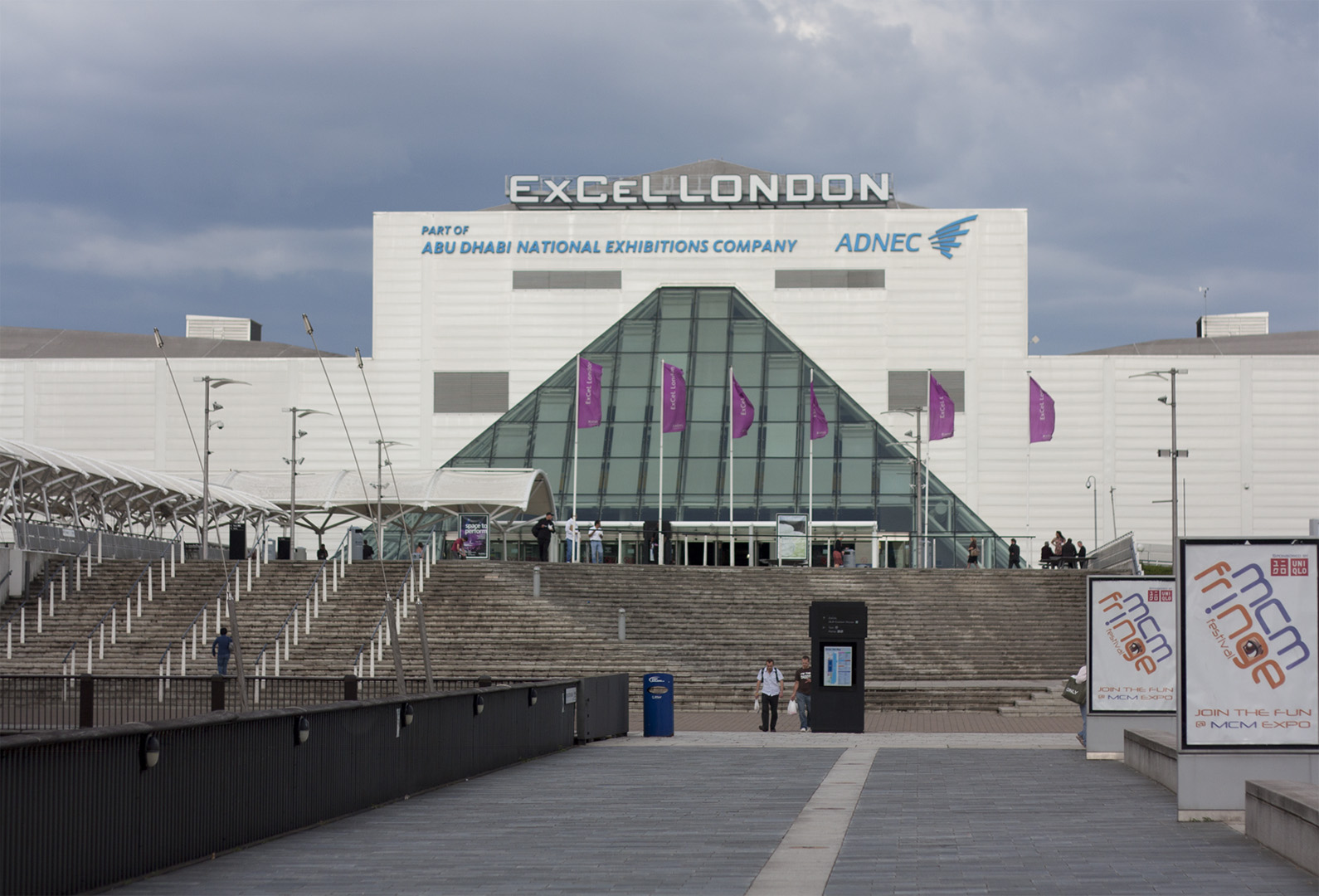
ExCeL Exhibition Centre west entrance

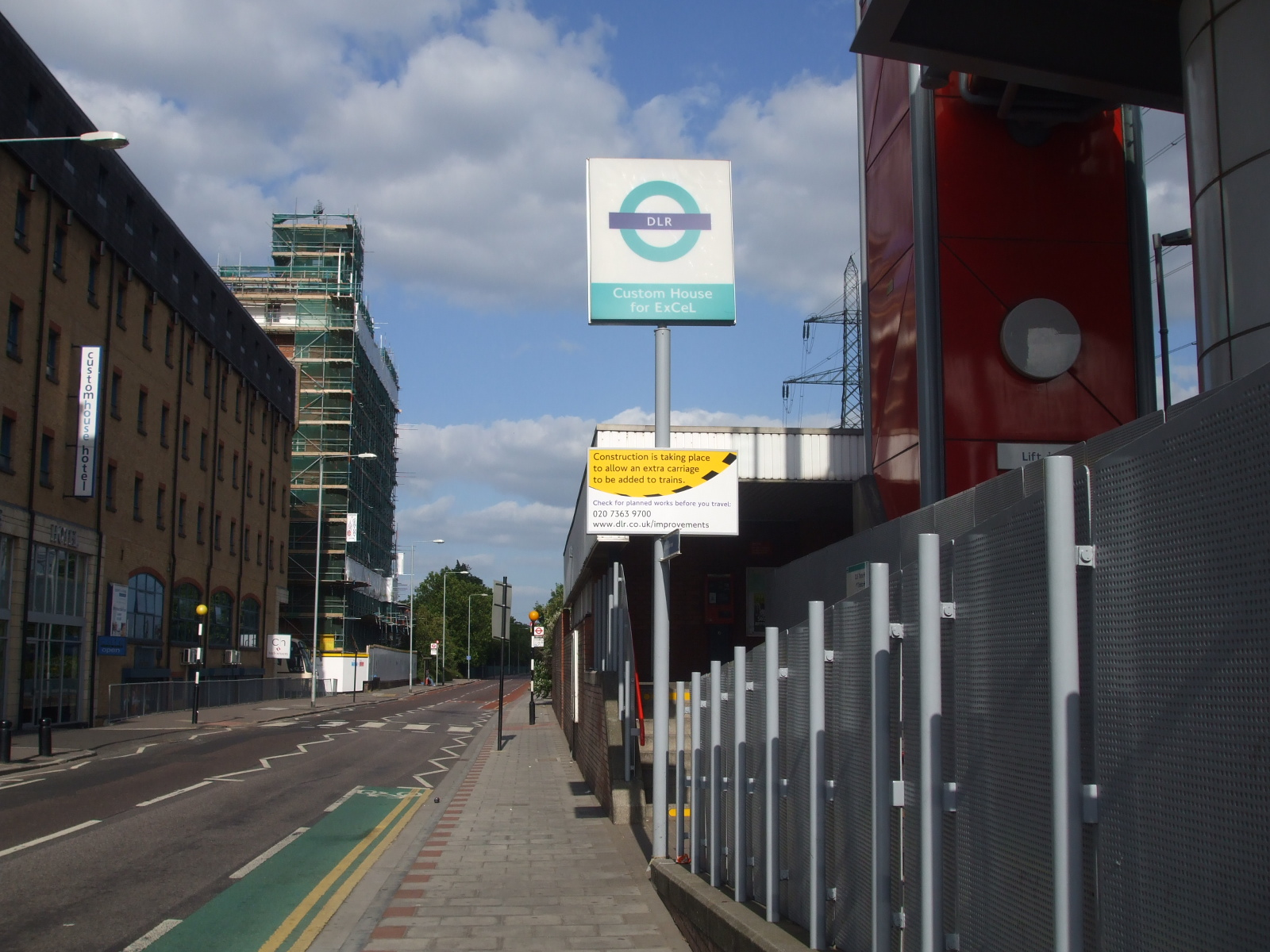
Custom House for ExCeL DLR station

The Custom House Hotel (on the corner of Freemasons Road), was opened in 2001 to service visitors to the ExCeL centre in the district.

With the large Beckton District Park South, King George V Park, vegetable allotments and arguably the north side of Royal Albert Dock, approximately half of Custom House's land use is for housing. The two main roads which serve Custom House are Freemasons Road near the Custom House DLR station and Prince Regent Lane. Buses serving Freemasons Road are the 241, 325 and 678 (school journeys only). The Custom House Surgery is also located on this road. The Royal Docks Community School and the Shipman Youth Centre are both on Prince Regent Lane, in addition to local stores which serve the residents. Bus routes passing through Prince Regent Lane are the 147, 300 and 473.

== Education ==
Custom House has one secondary school with academy status, and a number of primary schools:

Secondary Schools

- Royal Docks Academy

Primary Schools

- Calverton Primary School
- Rosetta Primary School
- St Joachim's RC Primary School (The school dates from 1896, though the present building was opened in 1968.)
- Scott Wilkie Primary School

== Sport and recreation ==
Custom House has one of the King George's Fields in memorial to King George V. The Canning Town recreational ground is located on Freemasons Road.

Custom House was home to a football league club, Thames A.F.C., from 1930 to 1932, when the club was dissolved.

Although there are no longer any football teams playing within Custom House, various teams in recent years with names containing 'Custom House' have played within close proximity. Custom House United (Est 2018) played at the Will Thorne Pavilion on Stansfeld Road in Beckton. Custom House Community FC (Est 2013) played at the Terence McMillan Stadium in neighbouring Plaistow, just over the A13 from Custom House. Custom House FC (founded in 2011) play at their home ground of Lyle Park in Silvertown.

Custom House was home to the West Ham Hammers speedway team at the 120,000 capacity West Ham Stadium. Many roads built on the stadium site following its demolition are named after the stars of the team - including Aub Lawson, Jack Young and promoter Johnnie Hoskins.

== Places of worship ==
In Custom House there are three purpose built Christian churches representing the Anglican, Baptist and Catholic denominations.

On Berwick Road is the church of St Anne, which today is part a two church Catholic parish known as the Parish of Our Lady of Walsingham (POLOW).

The Ascension Church is the Church of England place of worship on Baxter Road since 1891. On Prince Regent Lane next to the public library is the Custom House Baptist Church.

At different times in recent years, Royal Docks Academy has been used as a place of worship by various evangelical churches.

== Transport ==
=== Buses ===
Bus services are the 241, 325 and 678 (school journeys only) running along Freemasons Road, and the 147, 300 and 473 using Prince Regent Lane.

=== Docklands Light Railway and Crossrail ===
- Custom House Station, currently serving the Docklands Light Railway and Crossrail, also known as the Elizabeth Line.
- Prince Regent DLR Station

=== Roads ===
The district's roads feed into the London radial route the A11 to the north. In the east of the district a single carriageway, the A112, links Stratford via West Ham to the north to the Excel Exhibition Centre by Custom House railway station where it terminates in the south.

== Bibliography ==
- Power, A. (1997). Estates on the edge. Great Britain: MacMillan.

== See also ==
- ExCeL Exhibition Centre
- West Ham Stadium
