= Royal Docks Academy =

Coordinates: 51.5110°N 0.0349°E

Location
- Prince Regent Lane; Custom House; London, E16 3HS; England

Information
- Type: Academy
- Established: 1999
- Local authority: Newham
- Trust: Burnt Mill Academy Trust
- Department for Education URN: 145410 Tables
- Ofsted: Reports
- Gender: Male and Female
- Age: 11 to 16
- Enrolment: 844
- Colours: Blue, Black #045FB4black
- Website: http://www.royaldocksacademy.org

Royal Docks Academy (formerly Royal Docks Community School) is a coeducational secondary school located in Custom House within the London Borough of Newham, England. It does not have a sixth form.

== History ==
1945, this school was built another school had just been removed. But it was next to a stadium, which is called West Ham Stadium. West Ham Stadium was removed until towards the end of 1971 an announcement was made by Newham London Borough Council that West Ham would be sold for re-development. It survived until 26 May 1972 which still came as a shock because many had hoped for a reprieve. Royal Docks Academy It still exists today, and it's next to ExCeL London and hotels, shops, etc.

In September 1999, students and most of the staff of Woodside Community School in Plaistow, Newham, were relocated to new buildings in Custom House. The students from Woodside ran a competition to name the new school and design the logo, and this was won by a student named Joey. The school was given the name Royal Docks Community School.

The school buildings were seen to be state of the art at the time with nearly every classroom having digital interactive whiteboards, PCs with internet connections and Wi-Fi across the building - enabling teachers to use registers that would update attendance records immediately. This was at a time when other schools in the borough were still trialing a small number of interactive whiteboards.

The school was constructed with lifts and a spiral ramp instead of stairs. The sports hall/gymnasium on the first floor had sprung floorboards.

On 1 January 2018 the school converted to academy status and was renamed Royal Docks Academy. The school is now part of the Burnt Mill Academy Trust.
