= West Ham =

District in East London, England

Coordinates: 51.534°N 0.008°E

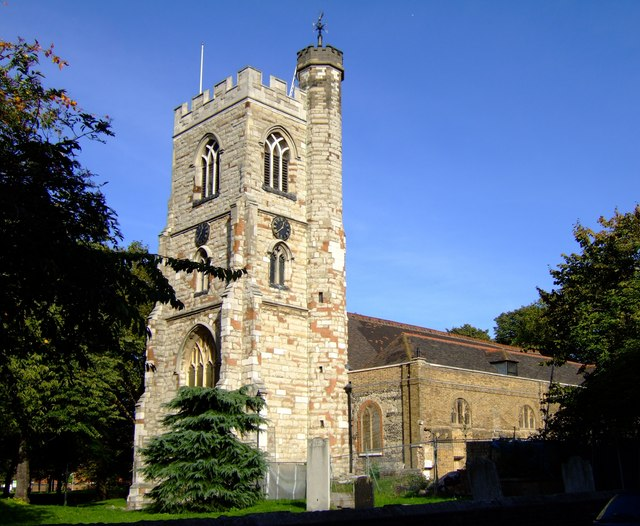
- All Saints' Church, serving the Ancient Parish of West Ham

- Location within Greater London
- Population: 15,551 (2011 Census, Ward)
- OS grid reference: TQ405837
  - Charing Cross: 6.1 mi (9.8 km) WSW
- London borough: Newham
- Ceremonial county: Greater London
- Region: London
- Country: England
- Sovereign state: United Kingdom
- Post town: LONDON
- Postcode district: E15
- Dialling code: 020
- Police: Metropolitan
- Fire: London
- Ambulance: London
- UK Parliament: West Ham and Beckton
- London Assembly: City and East

West Ham is a district in East London, England and is in the London Borough of Newham. It is an inner-city suburb located 6.1 mi (9.8 km) east of Charing Cross.

The area was originally an ancient parish formed to serve parts of the older Manor of Ham, and it later became a County Borough. The parish and borough of West Ham, situated east of the River Lea and north of the River Thames, was an administrative unit, with largely consistent boundaries, from the 12th century to 1965, when it merged with neighbouring areas to become the western part of the new London Borough. Before 1965, the area was part of the historic county of Essex.

West Ham's long established boundaries take in the sub-districts of Stratford, Canning Town, Plaistow, Custom House, Silvertown, Forest Gate and the western parts of Upton Park, which is shared with East Ham.

The district was historically dependent on its docks and other maritime trades, while the inland industrial concentrations led to its byname as the Factory centre of the south of England. These sources of employment have largely been lost. In the 21st century, there has been some revival, in part associated with development for the 2012 Olympic Games.

== History ==
=== Toponymy ===
The first known written use of the term, as 'Hamme', is in an Anglo-Saxon charter of 958, in which King Edgar granted the Manor of Ham, which was undivided at that time, to Ealdorman Athelstan. A subsequent charter of 1037 describes a transfer of land which has been identified with East Ham, indicating that the division of the territory occurred between 958 and 1037.

The place name derives from Old English 'hamm' and means 'a dry area of land between rivers or marshland', referring to the location of the settlement within boundaries formed by the rivers Lea, Thames and Roding and their marshes. North Woolwich seems likely to have been removed from Ham in the aftermath of the Norman Conquest.

The earliest recorded use of West Ham, as distinct from Ham or East Ham, was in 1186 as 'Westhamma'. The creation of Stratford Langthorne Abbey (one of England's larger monasteries), and the building of Bow Bridge, the only dry crossing of the Lea for many miles, are likely to have increased the prosperity of the area.

=== Tudor and Stuart ===
In June 1648, during the Wars of the Three Kingdoms, a Royalist force of some 500 to 600 men won a minor battle against the Tower Hamlets Militia at Bow Bridge and occupied Stratford for three days, before heading off along the old Roman Road to the Siege of Colchester.

=== Urbanisation ===
The village of West Ham underwent rapid growth from 1844 following the Metropolitan Building Act. The Act restricted dangerous and noxious industries from operating in the metropolitan area, the eastern boundary of which was the River Lea. Consequently, many of these activities were relocated to the other side of the river and to West Ham, then a parish in Essex centred on All Saints Church, West Ham. As a result, West Ham became one of Victorian Britain's major manufacturing centres for pharmaceuticals, chemicals and processed foods. This rapid growth earned it the name "London over the border". The growth of the town was summarised by The Times in 1886:

"Factory after factory was erected on the marshy wastes of Stratford and Plaistow, and it only required the construction at Canning Town of the Victoria and Albert Docks to make the once desolate parish of West Ham a manufacturing and commercial centre of the first importance and to bring upon it a teeming and an industrious population."

Many workers lived in slum conditions close to where they worked, leading to periodic outbreaks of contagious diseases and severe poverty.

=== First World War – West Ham Pals ===
In the First World War, the Mayor and Borough of West Ham raised a pals battalion of local volunteers, the 13th (Service) Battalion (West Ham) of the Essex Regiment. The battalion first paraded in February 1915 at St Luke's Church in Canning Town. East Ham also raised a battalion, but it joined a different regiment.

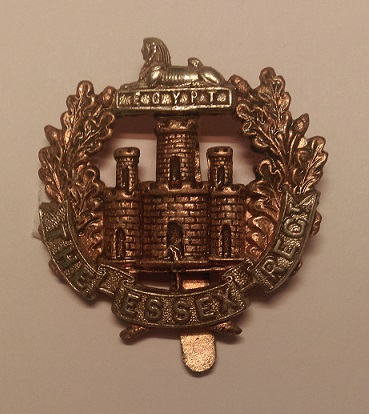
Essex Regiment Cap Badge

The West Ham Pals were assigned to the 6th Infantry Brigade of the 2nd Infantry Division and served on the Western Front. The battalion were locally nicknamed The Butterflies due to the name of their popular leader, Lieutenant Colonel Pelham Rawston Papillon (Papillon was of Huguenot ancestry, with Papillon meaning 'butterfly' in French).

The battalion's disbandment in February 1918 occurred as the British Army was so short of manpower that it could no longer maintain as many units, the surviving members of the West Ham battalion were re-assigned to other battalions of the Essex Regiment in order to bring them up to strength for the anticipated German offensive.

=== Second World War ===
The presence of the Royal Docks, the Stratford railway lands and other high value targets made West Ham one of the areas of London and Essex worst affected by bombing during the Second World War. There were officially 1186 civilians killed, but this may have been around 500 higher due to the disputed death toll at South Hallsville School.

=== Post-war ===
In March 1976, the IRA planted a bomb on a Metropolitan Line train, but it exploded prematurely, at West Ham station, injuring seven. The perpetrator shot and injured a member of the public and fled. The train driver, Julius Stevens, gave chase but was shot and killed. The perpetrator ran into the street where he was confronted by a policeman; he turned the gun on himself but survived.

In the 1970s and 1980s, the area suffered from deindustrialisation, including closure of the Bromley gasworks and West Ham Power Station.

== Administrative history ==
=== Local government – ancient parish ===
West Ham formed a large ancient parish of around 4,500 acres (18 km^{2}) in the Becontree hundred of Essex. The parish was made up of three wards: Church-street, Stratford-Langthorne, and Plaistow. The parish also included the hamlet of Upton.

The wards of West Ham Civil Parish in 1867.

=== Initial administrative response to urbanisation ===
In 1840 the parish was included in the Metropolitan Police District soon after the built-up area of London had encompassed much of West Ham.

It had become apparent that local government in the parish of West Ham was not adequate to meet the needs of the area which was divided between the parish vestry, highway board and the Havering and Dagenham Commissioners of Sewers. Problems centred on provision of adequate paving, water supply, fire fighting and control of development. In 1853 a group of ratepayers initiated moves to improve local administration. This led to a public enquiry by Charles Dickens' brother Alfred, a medical officer, who published a report in 1855 severely critical of conditions in the slum areas.

Accordingly, the Public Health Act 1848 (11 & 12 Vict. c. 63) was applied to the parish, and a local board of health was formed in 1856. The board had 15 members: 12 elected and 3 nominated by the Commissioners of Sewers.

West Ham was included in the London postal district, established in 1857, but not in the statutory metropolitan area established in 1855 or the County of London established in 1889. Instead, administrative reform was undertaken in the area in much the same way as a large provincial town. A local board was formed in 1856 under the Public Health Act 1848 (11 & 12 Vict. c. 63).

In November 1878 the inhabitants of the parish decided to petition the privy council for a charter, incorporating the town as a municipal borough. This was in reaction to proposals to enlarge the area governed by the Metropolitan Board of Works to include adjoining districts with a population of 50,000 or more: the primary aim of incorporation was to prevent the inclusion of West Ham in an enlarged London municipality. This initial application was unsuccessful. However, encouraged by the 1883 incorporation of Croydon, a second petition was submitted in May 1885. Following an inquiry in October 1885, a scheme for the creation of the borough and dissolution of the board of health was made in June and the charter was granted in July 1886. A corporation consisting of a mayor, 12 aldermen and 36 councillors replaced the board, with the first elections held on 1 November. The first mayor was John Meeson, head of a local lime burning and cement making firm, and a former chairman of West Ham Local Board.

=== Local government – County Borough ===
In 1889 the borough was large enough in terms of population to become a county borough and was outside the area of responsibility of Essex County Council – though still formally within the county. At the time of the 1901 census it was the ninth most populous district in England with a population of 267,308.[4] From 1934 to 1965 it was surrounded by the County Borough of East Ham to the east, the municipal boroughs of Wanstead and Woodford and Leyton to the north, and the metropolitan boroughs of Poplar to the west with the Thames to the south with Greenwich on the far side.

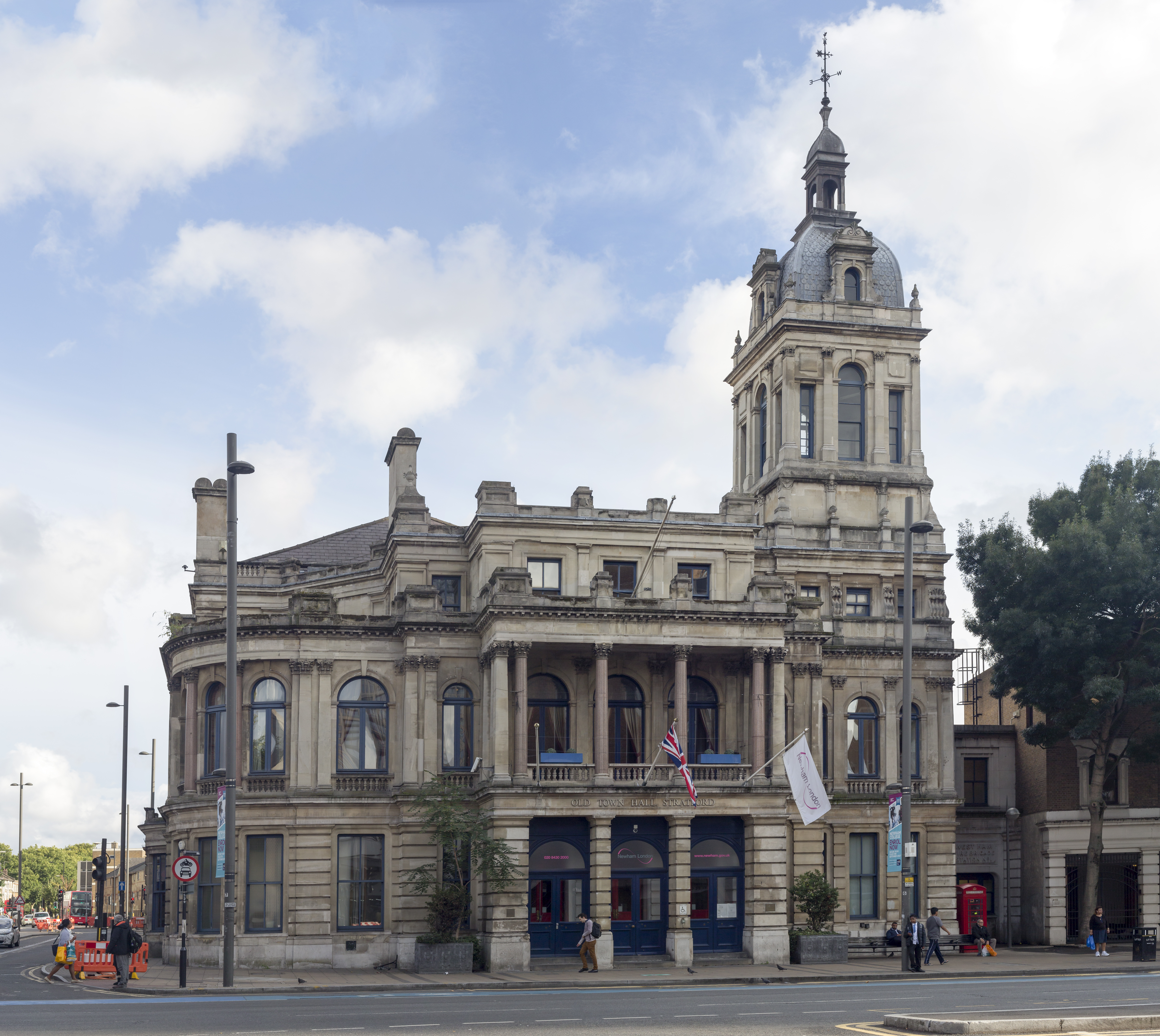
West Ham's former Town Hall, on Stratford Broadway.

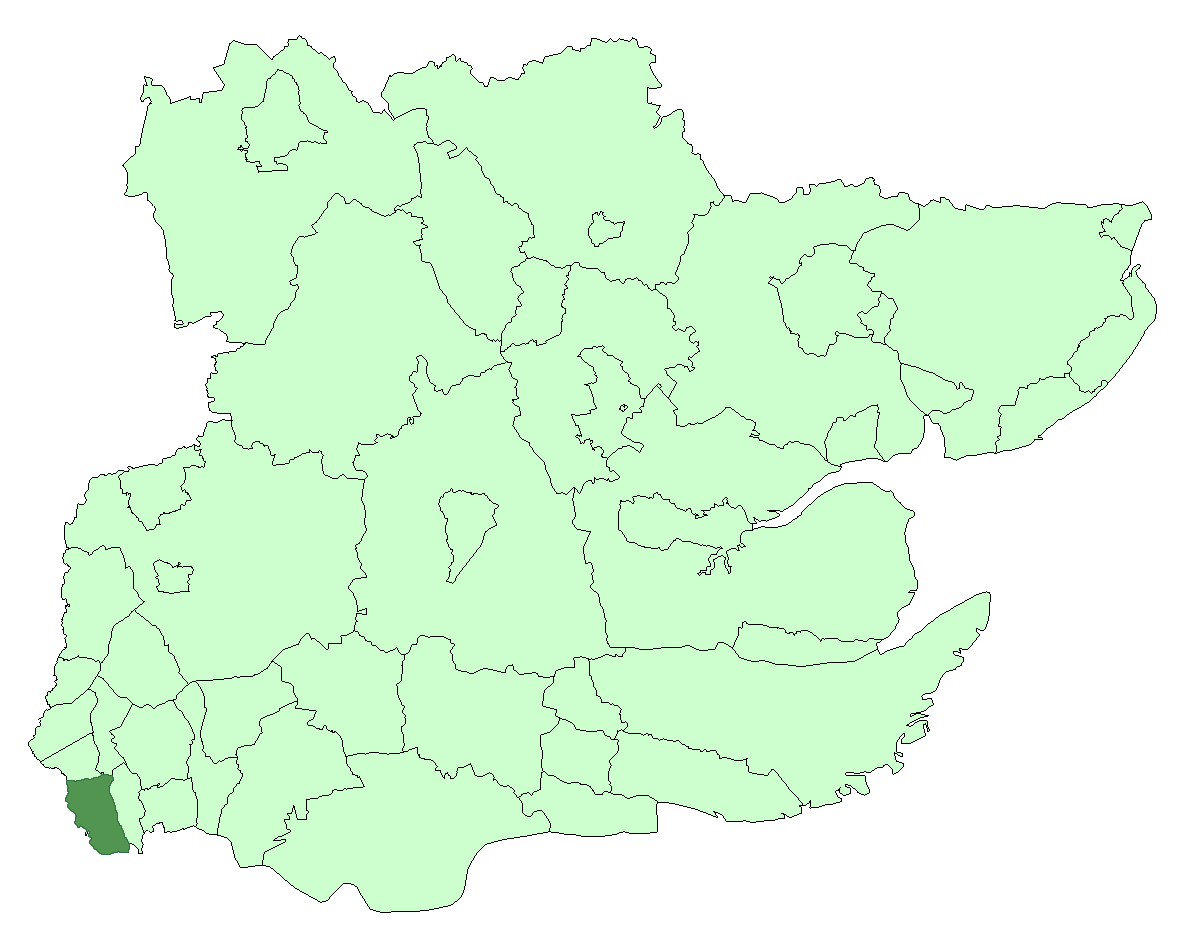
West Ham in Essex, 1961

=== Coat of arms ===
The coat of arms was granted by the College of Arms on 14 January 1887. The chevrons on the lower portion represent Stratford, taken from the device of Stratford Langthorne Abbey. At the top right, there are crossed hammers which are also shown as the centrepiece of West Ham United's badge, representing the Thames Ironworks and Shipbuilding Company – the borough's main employer. The ship is representative of the Royal Docks, and the area's long association with the sea. The Latin motto "Deo Confidimus" at the base translates as "In God We Trust."

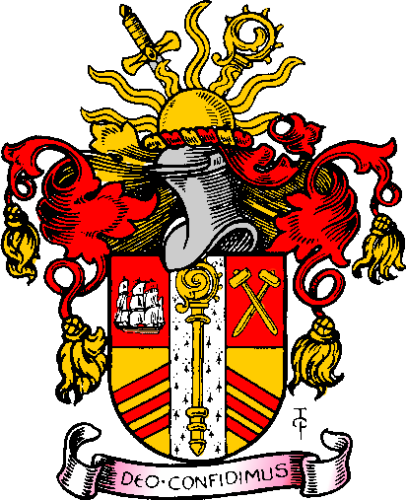
The coat of arms of the County Borough of West Ham

=== Formation of Newham and inclusion in Greater London ===
The omission of West Ham from the London-administered metropolitan area, which took in nearby places such as Greenwich and Woolwich, was first commented on in 1855 and West Ham Council later considered the case for inclusion in the County of London in 1895 and 1907. The reluctance to proceed with amalgamation was largely explained by lack of perceived support, fear of financial disadvantage caused by increased rates, the detrimental effect of London planning laws on industry, and the desire to retain the independent civic institutions and privileges attached to county borough status.

The Royal Commission on Local Government in Greater London reviewed the local government arrangements of the Greater London Conurbation and in 1965, under the terms of the London Government Act 1963, the county borough, and the County Borough of East Ham, were abolished and their former area was amalgamated with small parts of Barking and Woolwich to form the London Borough of Newham in Greater London.

West Ham is currently part of the West Ham ward for elections to Newham London Borough Council.

== Geography ==
The parish, and coterminous subsequent borough, lay east of the Lea and north of the Thames, with Leyton to the north and East Ham to the east. The boundary between West and East Ham was drawn from the now lost Hamfrith Waste and Hamfrith Wood in the north (then the southernmost parts of Epping Forest which extended as far south as the Romford Road at that time), along Green Street down to the small, similarly lost, natural harbour known as Ham Creek, the mouth of a small watercourse.

The area of the parish and borough included not just central West Ham area, just south of Stratford, with the twin focuses of All Saints' Parish Church and West Ham station; but also the sub-districts of Stratford, Canning Town, Plaistow, Custom House, Silvertown, Forest Gate and the western parts of Upton Park which is shared with East Ham.

The areas along the Lea and Thames were historically industrial with the remainder residential, mostly Victorian terraced housing interspersed with higher density post-war social housing. Since its urbanisation the area has always been one of the poorest in London.

=== Ethnicity ===
In 1971, individuals of non-European origin comprised approximately 16% of the population of West Ham, rising to approximately 30% by the 1991 census and 65.5% in the 2011 census. In 2011 White British people comprising 19% of the ward's population with Other White individuals forming approximately 15% of the population.

== Transport ==
West Ham station on Manor Road (formerly called The Memorial Grounds) is served by the London Underground Jubilee, Hammersmith, and City and District tube lines; the National Rail c2c services; and from 2010 the Docklands Light Railway. Plaistow and Stratford stations are also close by.

== Sport ==
The football club West Ham United F.C. is named after the area. Their nicknames, the Irons and the Hammers derive from their association with the Thames Ironworks and Shipbuilding Company, whose workers formed Thames Ironworks F.C. West Ham United F.C. played at the Boleyn Ground in nearby Upton Park between 1904 and 2016. The West Ham Stadium, a football, greyhound racing and speedway stadium, operated between 1928 and 1972, with a capacity of 120,000. The street names of housing developed on the site of the former stadium pay homage to the speedway greats associated with West Ham, including Bluey Wilkinson and Jack Young. The West Ham Hammers team were involved in the top flight leagues 1929 to 1939, 1946 to 1955 and 1964 to 1971, winning the inaugural British League in 1965.

While football is probably the main focus for the community, there is rugby, with Holland Road, next to West Ham station, home to 3 rugby teams which play in Essex RFU leagues: Phantoms RFC, Kings Cross Steelers and East London RFC.

== Notable people ==
- Frank Bailey (1925–2015), firefighter
- Leslie Bray (1895–1957), cricketer and officer in the British Army and Royal Air Force
- Sol Campbell, footballer
- Fred Corbett, footballer
- Tony Cottee, footballer
- Paul Parker, footballer
- Alan Curbishley, footballer and football manager
- Richard Harry Dennis, former Scotland Yard detective chief inspector
- George Edwards (1694–1773) ornithologist
- David Essex, musician
- Elizabeth Fry, social reformer
- Ted Fenton, footballer and football manager
- Len Goulden, footballer
- Leon Greene, opera singer and actor.
- Ernie Gregory, footballer
- Gerard Manley Hopkins, poet
- Chris Hughton, footballer and football manager
- Ronnie Irani, cricketer
- Rob Lee, footballer
- Jack Leslie, footballer
- Lennox Lewis, boxer and former undisputed world heavyweight champion
- Linda Lewis, singer, songwriter and musician
- Allan Levene, information technology specialist
- Joseph Lister, antiseptic surgeon
- Margaret Macadam, artist and illustrator
- Glen Murphy, actor, producer.
- Mark Noble, footballer
- Christine Ohuruogu, athlete
- Daisy Parsons, suffragette and West Ham's first woman Mayor
- Martin Peters, footballer and World Cup winner
- Kevin Stead, footballer
- Colin Towns, composer and keyboardist
- Margaret Tyzack, actress
- Bertha Willmott, entertainer
- Reg Varney, actor
- Steve Harris, musician

== Sources ==
- Jim Clifford. West Ham and the River Lea: A Social and Environmental History of London's Industrialized Marshland, 1839–1914. Vancouver. University of British Columbia Press, 2017.
