= Alka Sehgal Cuthbert =

British educator and academic

Alka Sehgal Cuthbert is a British educator, academic, and author. She is the director of the campaign group Don't Divide Us (DDU) and a writer on educational and cultural issues. Her work primarily focuses on the philosophy of education, social epistemology, and the preservation of disciplinary knowledge within the school curriculum.

== Education ==
Sehgal Cuthbert studied as an undergraduate at Newcastle Polytechnic before reading for an MA and subsequently a DPhil (PhD) in the Philosophy and Sociology of Education at the University of Cambridge. Her doctoral research explored the relationship between disciplinary knowledge and liberal education, focusing on the English literature syllabus.

== Career ==
=== Education and research ===
Sehgal Cuthbert taught English literature in inner-city London state schools for over 20 years. She has served as a member of the Ofsted Advisory Panel on English and provided evidence to the All-Party Parliamentary Group Inquiry on Knowledge and Skills in Education. As an academic, she is an advocate for a "knowledge-rich" curriculum, arguing that school subjects should be taught as distinct intellectual disciplines. She has appeared on BBC Radio 4's Sunday programme to discuss the teaching of "white privilege" and social justice in the classroom, where she argued for political neutrality in education.

=== Advocacy ===
In 2021, Sehgal Cuthbert became the director of "Don't Divide Us" (DDU), an organization that promotes a "colour-blind" approach to anti-racism and critiques the implementation of Critical Race Theory in public institutions. Her work with DDU includes reports on the Equality Act 2010 and its impact on institutional civility. She has been a frequent contributor to debates on free speech and "cancel culture".

Cuthbert has frequently appeared as a commentator on the BBC, including programs such as Sunday Morning Live, where she has argued for a "universalist" approach to anti-racism.

In 2023, her disinvitation from an education conference over "psychological safety" concerns was covered by national media, including The Telegraph and The Evening Standard.

=== Politics ===
In the 2019 United Kingdom general election, Sehgal Cuthbert stood as a candidate for the Brexit Party in the constituency of East Ham. She also stood for the party in the European Parliament elections for the London region.

== Published works ==
- What Should Schools Teach? Disciplines, Subjects and the Pursuit of Truth (Co-editor; UCL Press, 2017). ISBN 978-1787350304.
- The Dangers of New Anti-Racism (Contributor; 2020).
