= Canning Town =

District in Newham, East London, England

Coordinates: 51.515°N 0.026°E

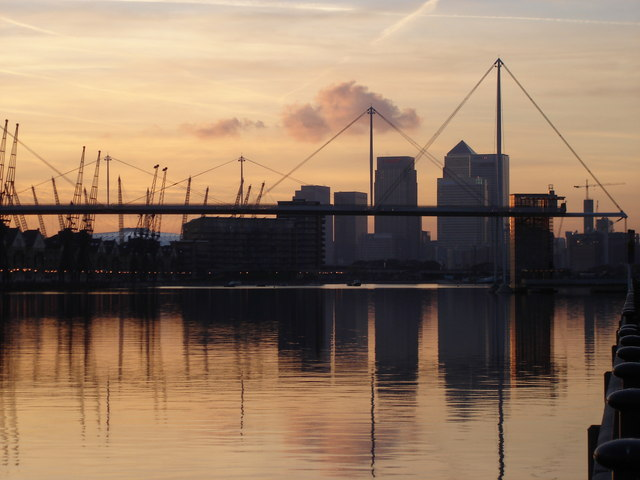
- Royal Victoria Dock - with Canary Wharf and the O2 Arena in the background

- Location within Greater London
- Population: 42,667 (Canning Town North And Canning Town South wards, 2021)
- OS grid reference: TQ4081
- London borough: Newham
- Ceremonial county: Greater London
- Region: London
- Country: England
- Sovereign state: United Kingdom
- Post town: LONDON
- Postcode district: E16, E13
- Dialling code: 020
- Police: Metropolitan
- Fire: London
- Ambulance: London
- UK Parliament: West Ham and Beckton
- London Assembly: City and East

Canning Town is a district of the London Borough of Newham, East London, England, north of the Royal Victoria Dock. Its urbanisation was largely due to the creation of the dock. The area was part of the ancient parish and County Borough of West Ham, which was a local government district in the south west of Essex from 1886 to 1965. It forms part of the London E16 postcode district.

Canning Town and the neighbouring Custom House have been undergoing a £3.7 billion regeneration in recent years, which includes the development of up to 10,000 new homes.

== History ==
=== Bridges facilitate development ===
Before the 19th century, the district was largely marshland, and accessible only by boat, or a toll bridge. In 1809, an Act of Parliament was passed for the construction of the Barking Road between the East India Docks and Barking. A five-span iron bridge was constructed in 1810 to carry the road across the River Lea at Bow Creek. This bridge was damaged by a collision with a collier in March 1887 and replaced by the London County Council (LCC) in 1896. This bridge was in turn replaced in 1934, at a site to the north and today's concrete flyover begun in smaller form in the 1960s, but successively modified to incorporate new road layouts for the upgraded A13 road and a feeder to the Limehouse Link tunnel, avoiding the Blackwall Tunnel. The abutments of the old iron bridge have now been utilised for the Jubilee footbridge, linking the area to Leamouth, in the London Borough of Tower Hamlets, on the western bank of the Lea.

The area is thought to be named after the first Viceroy of India, Charles John Canning, who suppressed the Indian Rebellion of 1857 about the time the district expanded. The population increased rapidly after the North London Line was built from Stratford to North Woolwich, in 1846. This was built to carry coal and goods from the docks; and when the passenger station was first built it was known as Barking Road. Speculative builders constructed houses for the workers attracted by the new chemical industries established in the lower reaches of the River Lea, and for the nearby Thames Ironworks and Shipbuilding Company and Tate & Lyle refinery.

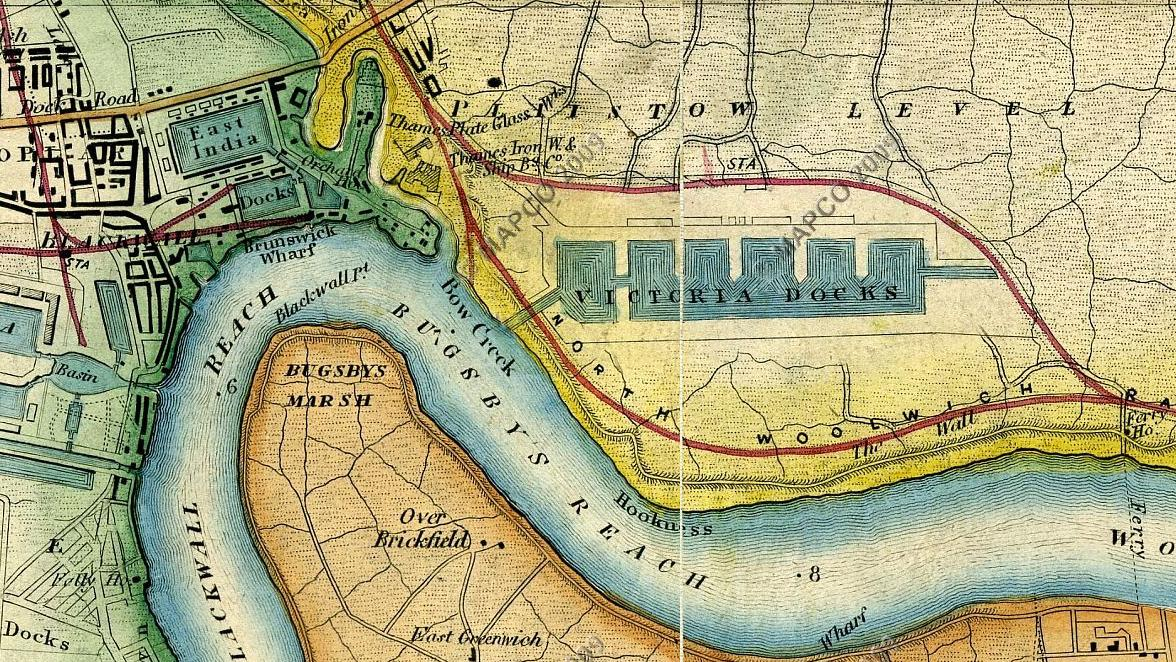
Map c.1872, showing Victoria Docks, now Royal Victoria Dock, Bow Creek and the Thames Ironworks and Shipbuilding Company

Map 1908, showing Canning Town to the north of Royal Victoria Dock and Silvertown to the south of the dock

The first workers' homes built in Canning Town around 1850

Bidder Street in 1891, one of the oldest parts of Canning Town. The area is now an industrial area

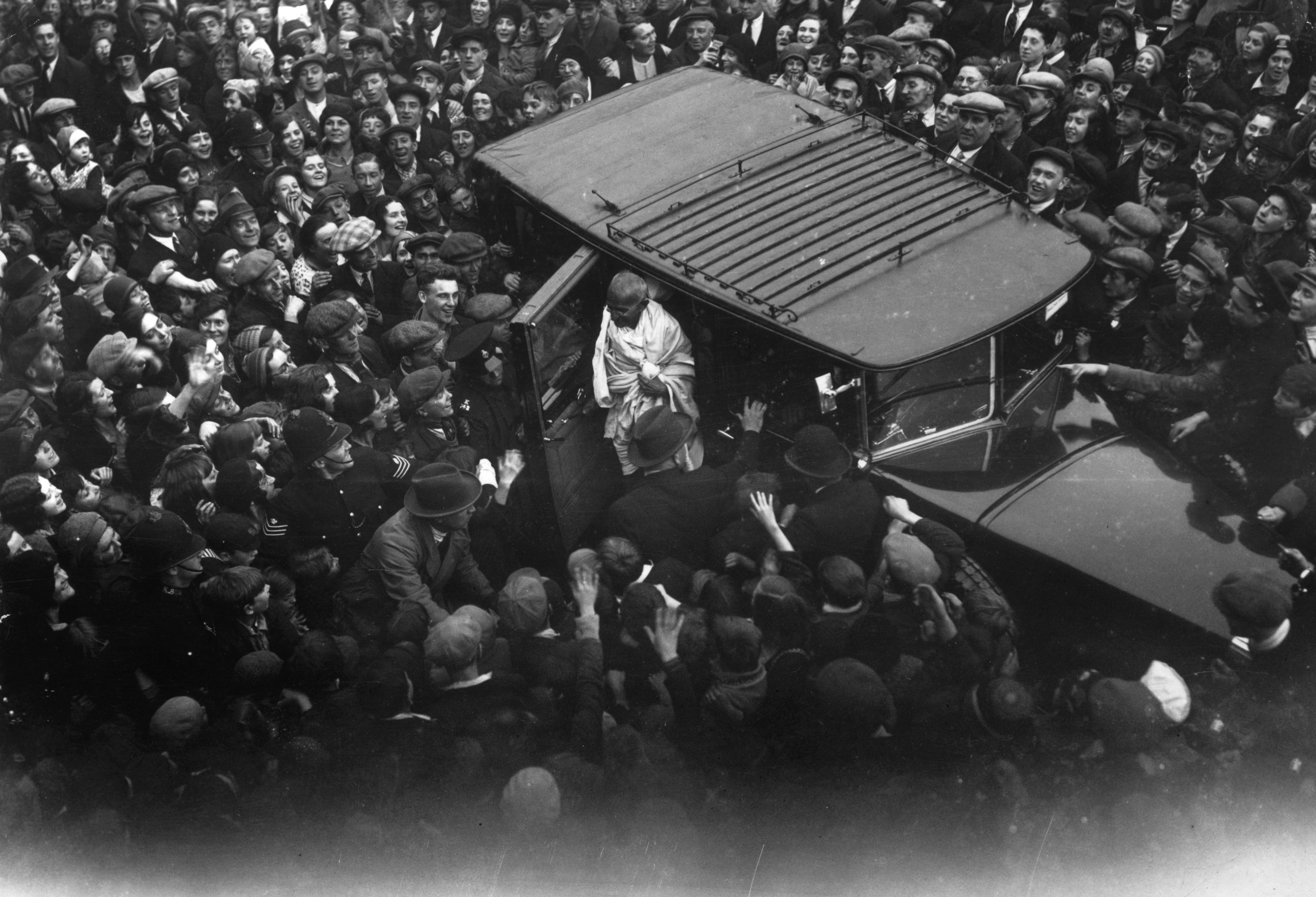
Canning Town welcomes Gandhi, 1931

=== Royal Victoria Dock opens ===
The opening of the Royal Victoria Dock in 1855 accelerated the development of the area creating employment and a need to house dock workers and their families. New settlements around the dock developed, starting with Canning Town and Hallsville (Hallsville generally being seen as part of Canning Town), and later the areas now known as Custom House and Silvertown. The new settlements lacked water supply and had no sewage system, leading to the spread of cholera and smallpox. The casual nature of employment at the docks meant poverty and squalid living conditions for many residents, and in 1857 Henry Morley wrote about the area:

"Canning Town is the child of the Victoria Docks. The condition of this place and of its neighbour prevents the steadier class of mechanics from residing in it. They go from their work to Stratford or to Plaistow. Many select such a dwelling place because they are already debased below the point of enmity to filth; poorer labourers live there, because they cannot afford to go farther, and there become debased. The Dock Company is surely, to a very great extent, answerable for the condition of the town they are creating. Not a few of the houses in it are built by poor and ignorant men who have saved a few hundred pounds, and are deluded by the prospect of a fatally cheap building investment."

— Londoners over the Border, Household Words

The industries around the dock were often unhealthy and dangerous. As trade unions and political activists fought for better living conditions and the dock area became the centre of numerous movements with Will Thorne, James Keir Hardie and other later becoming leading figures in the Labour Party. Thorne and others worked and gave speeches at Canning Town Public Hall which had been built in 1894 as the population grew in the southern part of the borough.

=== Diversity ===
From the late 19th century, a large African mariner community was established in Canning Town as a result of new shipping links to the Caribbean and West Africa. Prior to the Windrush era, Canning Town had London's largest black population of any area in London. The area around Crown Street (formerly located just north of the Royal Victoria Dock, but destroyed in the Blitz) was known as Draughtboard Alley due its ethnic mix.

Notable black people from Canning Town include footballers Fred Corbett, who played for Thames Ironworks F.C. and its successor team West Ham United; and Jack Leslie, who was called up to play for England, but then dropped without explanation, possibly due to racial prejudice.

The second black West Ham player, was another Canning Town man, John Charles. John Charles became the first black person to represent England at any level when he appeared for the Under 18s, scoring a goal in a 3-1 win over Israel.

John Charles younger brother Clive Charles also played for West Ham. In 1972 West Ham were the first top-flight team to field three Black players. Clive Charles and teammates Clyde Best and Ade Coker featured in a 3-1 home win over Tottenham Hotspur. Clive Charles would go on to manage the United States football team.

A further example of the area's long-standing multi-cultural nature is Indian-born doctor Chuni Lal Katial, who practised in Canning Town for several years from around 1929. Katial was an acquaintance of Mahatma Gandhi and invited him to meet Charlie Chaplin, one of the most famous actors in the world, at his surgery in Beckton Road. Gandhi was staying at Kingsley Hall, in nearby Bromley-by-Bow, for the three-month duration of his talks with the UK government on the future of India. Katial, a noted health pioneer, later moved to the Metropolitan Borough of Finsbury, in north London, where he became Britain's first south Asian Mayor.

=== Silvertown explosion ===
In 1917 50 tons of TNT exploded at the Brunner Mond & Co ammunition work in nearby Silvertown, causing the Silvertown explosion, the largest explosion in London's history and damaging more than 70,000 buildings and killing 73 people.

=== Slum clearance ===
In the 1930s the County Borough of West Ham commenced slum clearances. New houses, clinics, nurseries and a lido were opened. Silvertown ByPass and Britain's first flyover, the Silvertown Way, were built along with other new approach roads to the docks. Canning Town was heavily hit by the bombings in World War II and West Ham Council's plan to rebuild the area focused on a reduction of the population, transferring industry and the building of new housing such as the Keir Hardie Estate, which included schools and welfare services. In the early hours of 10 September 1940, a bomb hit South Hallsville School where up to 600 local refugees were accommodated. At least 200, mainly children, were killed or injured. Many bodies were never recovered.

The slum clearances and the devastation of World War II, destroying 85% of the housing stock, led to the preponderance of council estates that characterise the area today. Post-war housing schemes followed the urban planning principles of the garden city movement. As demand for housing grew the first high rise buildings were built in Canning Town in 1961. In 1968 part of Ronan Point, a 22-storey tower block, collapsed and most of the tall tower blocks built in the area in the early 1960s were eventually demolished or reduced in size.

== Slum housing ==
Notice to the poor on cholera, 1848. From the minutes of the West Ham Board of Guardians. States amongst others: "The Guardians are prepared to issue "CERTIFICATES" to the Poor generally, entitling them to Medical Relief gratuitously, should "CHOLERA" break out, or its symptoms prevail in the Neighbourhood."

The Little Tommy Lee sewer, an open sewer in Canning Town, c.1888

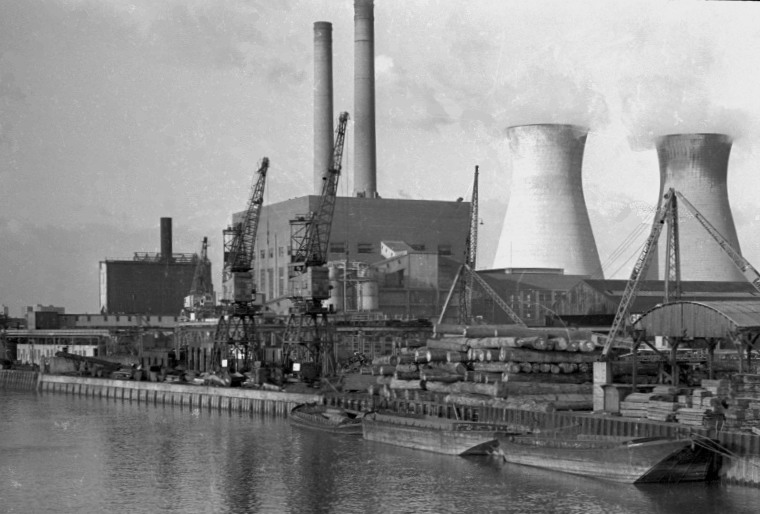
The West Ham Power Station, also known as Canning Town Power Station, next to Bow Creek on Tucker Street in 1973

=== Victorian era ===
In 1857 Henry Morley published a detailed description of the area in Charles Dickens' Household Words entitled "Londoners over the Border", writing:

"...by the law there is one suburb on the border of the Essex marshes which is quite cut off from the comforts of the Metropolitan Buildings Act;-in fact, it lies just without its boundaries, and therefore is chosen as a place of refuge for offensive trade establishments turned out of the town, - those of oil boilers, gut spinners, varnish makers, printers ink makers and the like. Being cut off from the support of the Metropolitan Local Managing Act, this outskirt is free to possess new streets of houses without drains, roads, gas, or pavement."

Describing the slum housing conditions and its effect on the health of local residents, Morley wrote:

"Rows of small houses, which may have cost for their construction eighty pounds a piece, are built designedly and systematically with their backs to the marsh ditches; ...two or three yards of clay pipe "drain" each house into the open cess pool under its back windows, when it does not happen that the house is built as to overhang it... In winter time every block becomes now and then an island, and you may hear a sick man, in an upper room, complain of water trickling down over his bed. Then the flood cleans the ditches, lifting all their filth into itself, and spreading it over the land. No wonder that the stench of the marsh in Hallsville and Canning Town of nights, is horrible. A fetid mist covers the ground... the parish surgeon... was himself for a time invalided by fever, upon which ague followed. Ague, of course, is one of the most prevalent diseases of the district; fever abounds. When an epidemic comes into the place, it becomes serious in its form, and stays for months. Disease comes upon human bodies saturated with the influences of such air as is breathed day and night, as a spark upon touchwood. A case or two of small pox caused, in spite of vaccination, an epidemic of confluent small pox, which remained three or four months upon the spot."

Morley also describes efforts to improve the housing conditions in the area:

"Two years ago, when application was made by more than a tenth of the rate payers of the parish of West Ham for an inquiry into the sanitary condition of the district, with a view to bringing it under the conditions of the Public Health Act, Mr Alfred Dickens was the civil engineer sent by the general Board of Health as an inspector. His report and the evidence at his inquiry is before us as we write, and it dwells very much upon the state of Canning Town and Hallsville. We learn from this report that the area of the ditches in the parish amounted to not less than one hundred and fifty acres, according to a surveyors book upwards of thirty five years old, and that area has been increased by side cuttings at the railway and new cuttings of open sewer. Disease had cost the parish six hundred pounds in the year previous to the inquiry. There was then, of course, as now, no drainage or paving in Canning Town; the roads in winter were impassable; but the inhabitants were paying (for what they did not get) an eighteen penny rate under the Commissioners Act, not for works done in accordance with it, but "for the expenses of the act". Also, although the parish did not take charge of their roads, they were paying a highway rate for the parishioners elsewhere. One horrible detail in Mr Dickens report has, happily, to be omitted from our sketch. Two years ago, there was in Hallsville and Canning Town no water supply. Good water is now laid on. In all other respects, the old offences against civilised life cleave to the district. The local Board of Health which the inhabitants of the parish sought and obtained, whatever it may have done for Stratford, seems to have done nothing for Hallsville, unless it be considered something to indulge it with an odd pinch of deodorising powder."

Alfred Dickens highlighted the severe overcrowding suffered by many of the slum inhabitants as a result of landlord charging high rents and households relying on casual work.

=== 19th century ===
The 1890 Housing Act made the local council responsible for providing decent accommodation, and in the 1890s some of the first council houses were built in Bethell Avenue. However, many of the terraced houses built during the late 19th century were little more than slums and cleared by the council in the 1930s. The council replaced the terraces with the first high-rise blocks.

=== 21st century ===
According to Newham London Borough Council, Canning Town and Custom House are among the five per cent most deprived areas in the UK. Residents suffer from poor health, low education and poverty. 17 per cent of the working age population have a limiting long-term illness, 17.5 per cent claim income support and 49.7 per cent of 16- to 74-year-olds have no formal qualifications.

== Regeneration ==
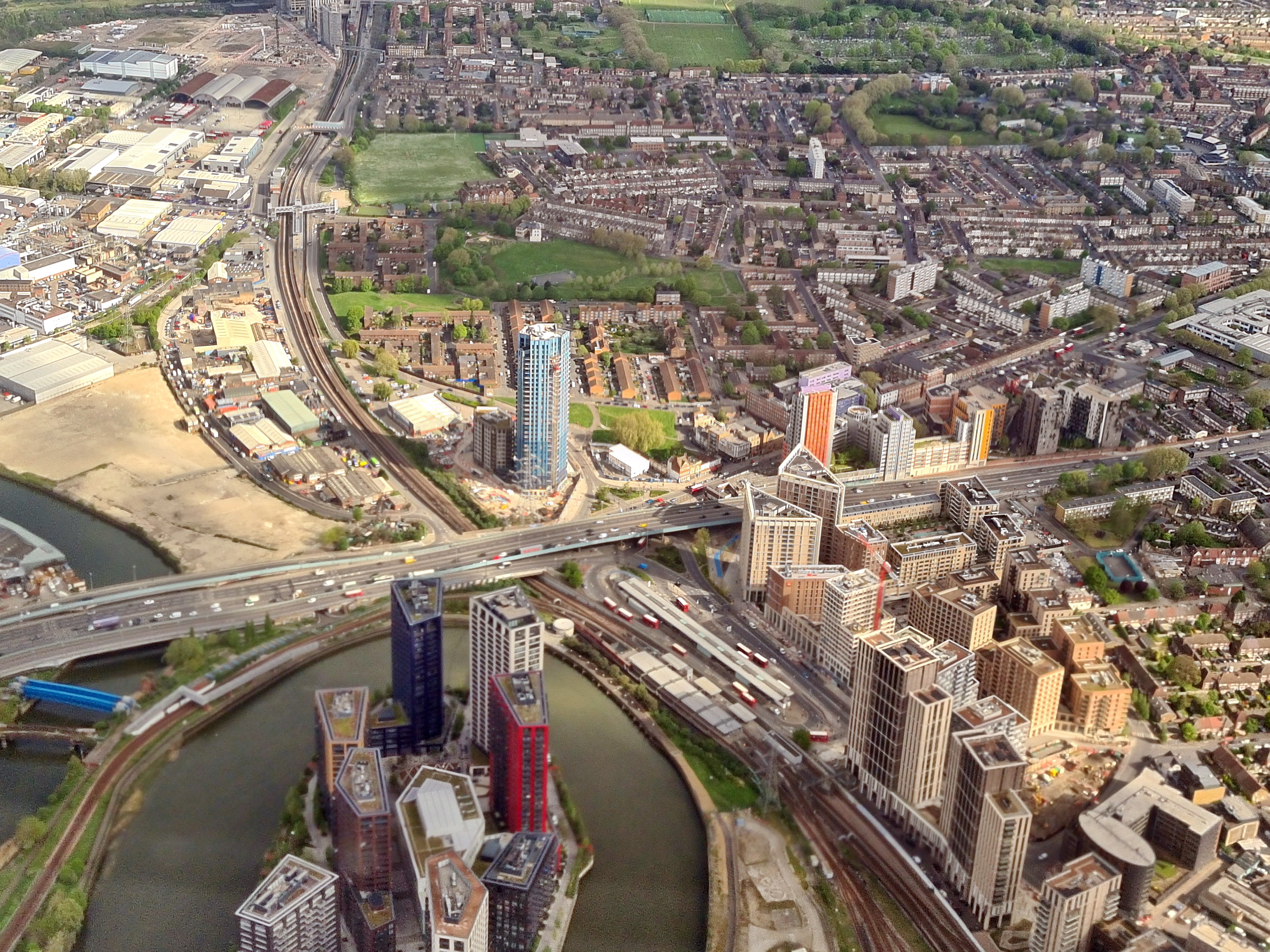
Canning Town in 2024: a mixture of industrial and housing estates, and an increasing number of modern highrises around Canning Town Station

The consultation and governance mechanism of the currently ongoing regeneration project is underpinning by a partnership between councillors, residents, local businesses and other "partners". According to Newham council:

"The views of residents and businesses is central to the development and delivery of the regeneration initiative and developers will be expected to continue with extensive community consultation and engagement as part of their remit."

Newham council is currently attempting to encourage "re-interpretations" of London's established street and housing forms. The council has identified terraced housing as such housing form, stating that it "continues to have enduring popularity with all types of residents including families and children".

The area is at the western end of the Thames Gateway zone and is currently undergoing a £2.7 billion regeneration project, which includes:

- demolishing 2,750 homes and building 10,000 new homes
- creating 500,000 square metres of floor-space in a revitalised town centre
- providing community facilities, including a library, a health centre
- undertaking improvements to primary schools

The Olympic Uniform Distribution and Accreditation Centre, which was located in Canning Town, was due to be demolished and replaced with a new industrial estate as part of the Olympic Legacy programme.

=== Caxton Works ===
In late 2026, residents of five blocks of apartments in Canning Town's Caxton Works development (also known as Royal Gateway) were forced to evacuate due to structural engineering issues in the buildings, completed by Galliard Homes in 2018.

== Politics and local government ==
The area was part of the ancient parish of West Ham, in the hundred of Becontree in Essex. It became part of the new County Borough of West Ham in 1900 (the parish and the County Borough had near identical boundaries). In 1965 the area became part of the new London Borough of Newham in Greater London.

The area falls within the West Ham and Beckton constituency. The local Member of Parliament is James Asser from Labour. Canning Town North and Canning Town South wards are in the London Borough of Newham.

In May 2002, Canning Town South was the only ward in the Borough to return a non-Labour councillor. In 2006, residents elected three Christian Peoples Alliance candidates, one of whom was Alan Craig. In 2010, Labour gained all three seats and have held them with significant majorities since.

== Culture ==
Thames Ironworks F.C., the works team of the nearby Ironworks, went on to become West Ham United F.C. after turning professional.

The Bridge House, a public house named for the 1887 Iron Bridge, was located at 23 Barking Road. During the 1970s and 1980s the Bridge House was a famous live-music venue and hosted The Police, Depeche Mode, Jeff Beck, Billy Bragg, Alexis Korner, Modern Romance, Sham 69, Lindisfarne, The Cockney Rejects, Iron Maiden and many other notable acts. It was demolished in 2002. A venue named The Bridge House 2 was opened in Bidder Street in January 2008.

== Transport ==
London Buses route 5, 69, 115, 147, 241, 300, 309, 323, 330, 474 and night routes N15, N550 and N551 all serve Canning Town at the bus station,

Route D3 starts/ends at Leamouth and route 276 runs on Barking Road, and 325 route at Canning Town Recreation Ground and Custom House, and route 473 and school route 678 start at Prince Regent bus station.
