= Plaistow West and Canning Town East =

Electoral ward in London, England

- Electoral ward for the Newham London Borough Council
- Borough: Newham
- County: Greater London
- Population: 18,418 (2024 estimate)
- Area: 1.189 km²

Current electoral ward
- Created: 2022
- Seats: 3

Plaistow West and Canning Town East is an electoral ward in the London Borough of Newham. The ward was first used in the 2022 elections and elects three councillors to Newham London Borough Council.

== Geography ==
The ward is named after the western areas of Plaistow and eastern areas of Canning Town.

== Councillors ==
Election	Councillors		
2022	Dina Hossain (Labour)	John Morris (Labour)	Simon Rush (Labour)

== Elections ==
=== 2022 ===
Plaistow West & Canning Town East (3)
Party	Candidate	Votes	%	±%
Labour	Dina Hossain	1,654	64.6	N/A
Labour	John Morris	1,578	61.7	N/A
Labour	Simon Rush	1,475	57.6	N/A
Conservative	Tom Barber	399	15.6	N/A
Green	Jacintha Christopher	367	14.3	N/A
Conservative	Aimee Alado	344	13.4	N/A
Green	Peter Whittle	335	13.1	N/A
Green	Christopher Slevin	293	11.4	N/A
Liberal Democrats	Robert Briggs	288	11.3	N/A
TUSC	Nicola Barratt	254	9.9	N/A
Conservative	Adeola Odutola	246	9.6	N/A
CPA	John Falana	167	6.5	N/A
CPA	Shoyemi Shoyemi	153	6.0	N/A
CPA	Ugochi Nwogwugwu	124	4.8	N/A
Turnout		2,606	35.1	N/A
Registered electors		7,424		
Labour win (new seat)				
Labour win (new seat)				
Labour win (new seat)				

== See also ==
- List of electoral wards in Greater London
