= Maryland (ward) =

- Electoral ward for the Newham London Borough Council
- Maryland ward boundaries since 2022
- Borough: Newham
- County: Greater London
- Population: 14,305 (2021) (Note: 2021 Census data reported for 2022 ward boundaries)
- Electorate: 8,296 (2022)
- Major settlements: Maryland
- Area: 0.8707 square kilometres (0.3362 sq mi)

Current electoral ward
- Created: 2022
- Councillors: 2
- Created from: Forest Gate North, Forest Gate South, Stratford and New Town
- GSS code: E05013917

Maryland is an electoral ward in the London Borough of Newham. The ward was first used in the 2022 elections. It returns two councillors to Newham London Borough Council.

== List of councillors ==
Term	Councillor	Party
2022–present	Carolyn Corben	Labour
2022–2024	Ken Penton	Labour
2024–present	Melanie Onovo	Labour

== Newham council elections ==
=== 2024 by-election ===
The by-election on 4 July 2024 took place on the same day as the United Kingdom general election. It followed the resignation of Ken Penton.

2024 Maryland by-election
Party	Candidate	Votes	%	±%
Labour	Melanie Onovo	1,626		
Independent	Linda Jordan	896		
Green	Chris Brooks	712		
Conservative	Mary Antwi	360		
Liberal Democrats	David Terrar	185		
Turnout			41	
Labour hold		Swing		

=== 2022 election ===
The election took place on 5 May 2022.

2022 Newham London Borough Council election: Maryland (2)
Party	Candidate	Votes	%	±%
Labour	Carolyn Corben	1,484	67.6	N/A
Labour	Ken Penton	1,330	60.6	N/A
Green	Chris Brooks	396	18.0	N/A
Green	Vinali Ainsley	366	16.7	N/A
Liberal Democrats	Karina Celis Rangel	242	11.0	N/A
Conservative	Freddie Downing	234	10.7	N/A
Conservative	Brian Maze	220	10.0	N/A
TUSC	Ferdy Lyons	117	5.3	N/A
Turnout		2,252	27.0	N/A
Registered electors		8,296		
Labour win (new seat)				
Labour win (new seat)				
