= Royal Victoria (ward) =

- Electoral ward for the Newham London Borough Council
- Royal Victoria ward boundaries since 2022
- Borough: Newham
- County: Greater London
- Population: 14,538 (2021) (Note: 2021 Census data reported for 2022 ward boundaries)
- Electorate: 9,642 (2022)
- Area: 1.625 square kilometres (0.627 sq mi)

Current electoral ward
- Created: 2022
- Number of members: 2
- Councillors: Steve Brayshaw; Caroline Adaja
- Created from: Canning Town South, Custom House, Royal Docks
- GSS code: E05013923

Royal Victoria is an electoral ward in the London Borough of Newham. The ward was first used in the 2022 elections. It returns two councillors to Newham London Borough Council.

== List of councillors ==
Term	Councillor	Party
2022–present	Steve Brayshaw	Labour
2022–present	Caroline Adaja	Labour

== Newham council elections ==
=== 2022 election ===
The election took place on 5 May 2022.

2022 Newham London Borough Council election: Royal Victoria (2)
Party	Candidate	Votes	%	±%
Labour	Steve Brayshaw	856	48.4	N/A
Labour	Caroline Adaja	833	47.1	N/A
Green	Rob Callender	389	22.0	N/A
Green	Gloria Goncalves	368	20.8	N/A
Conservative	Mark Seymour	341	19.3	N/A
Conservative	Joshua Darren Lindl	324	18.3	N/A
Liberal Democrats	Breanna Frances Kolada	229	12.9	N/A
Liberal Democrats	James Raymond	199	11.2	N/A
Turnout		1,921	20.1	N/A
Registered electors		9,642		
Labour win (new seat)				
Labour win (new seat)				
