= Forest Gate South =

Electoral ward in London, England

- Electoral ward for the Newham London Borough Council
- Borough: Newham
- County: Greater London
- Population: 18,656 (2021)
- Major settlements: Forest Gate
- Area: 1.263 km²

Current electoral ward
- Created: 2002
- Seats: 3

Forest Gate South is an electoral ward in the London Borough of Newham. The ward was first used in the 2002 elections and elects three councillors to Newham London Borough Council.

== Geography ==
The ward is based on the southern areas of Forest Gate. The northern parts are in the Forest Gate North ward.

== Councillors ==
Election	Councillors		
2022	Anamul Islam (Labour)	Madeleine Sarley Pontin (Labour)	Winston Vaughan (Labour)

== Elections ==
=== 2022 ===
Forest Gate South (3)
Party	Candidate	Votes	%	±%
Labour	Anamul Islam	1,837	68.7	N/A
Labour	Madeleine Pontin	1,749	65.4	N/A
Labour	Winston Vaughan	1,491	55.7	N/A
Green	Emma Sorrell	559	20.9	N/A
Green	Kieren Jones	554	20.7	N/A
Green	Benjamin Beeler	501	18.7	N/A
Conservative	Akmol Hussain	423	15.8	N/A
Conservative	Olenka Gradosielska	331	12.4	N/A
Liberal Democrats	David Terrar	319	11.9	N/A
Conservative	Nikolay Kolchev	263	9.8	N/A
Turnout		3,126	27.5	N/A
Registered electors		11,381		
Labour hold		Swing		
Labour hold		Swing		
Labour hold		Swing		

== See also ==
- List of electoral wards in Greater London
