= Royal Albert (ward) =

- Electoral ward for the Newham London Borough Council
- Royal Albert ward boundaries since 2022
- Borough: Newham
- County: Greater London
- Population: 9,306 (2021) (Note: 2021 Census data reported for 2022 ward boundaries)
- Electorate: 7,042 (2022)
- Area: 2.261 square kilometres (0.873 sq mi)

Current electoral ward
- Created: 2022
- Councillors: 2
- Created from: Beckton, Custom House, Royal Docks
- GSS code: E05013922

Royal Albert is an electoral ward in the London Borough of Newham. The ward was first used in the 2022 elections. It returns two councillors to Newham London Borough Council.

== List of councillors ==
Term	Councillor	Party
2022–present	Ann Easter	Labour
2022–2026	Tony McAlmont	Labour
2026–present	Poojitha Konkati	Green

== Newham council elections ==
=== 2026 election ===
The election took place on 7 May 2026.

=== 2022 election ===
The election took place on 5 May 2022.

2022 Newham London Borough Council election: Royal Albert (2)
Party	Candidate	Votes	%	±%
Labour	Ann Easter	849	65.6	N/A
Labour	Tony McAlmont	692	53.5	N/A
Green	Jane Lithgow	227	17.5	N/A
Conservative	Douglas Coleman	217	16.8	N/A
Conservative	Maurisa Coleman	177	13.7	N/A
Green	Daniel Rodrigues	162	12.5	N/A
Liberal Democrats	James Jones	118	9.1	N/A
Liberal Democrats	Callum Littlemore	99	7.6	N/A
Reform	Daniel Oxley	48	3.7	N/A
Turnout		1,509	21.4	N/A
Registered electors		7,042		
Labour win (new seat)				
Labour win (new seat)				
