= East Ham South (ward) =

Electoral ward in London, England

- Electoral ward for the Newham London Borough Council
- Borough: Newham
- County: Greater London
- Population: 18,880 (2021)
- Major settlements: East Ham
- Area: 1.871 km²

Current electoral ward
- Created: 2002
- Seats: 3

East Ham South is an electoral ward in the London Borough of Newham. The ward was first used in the 2002 elections and elects three councillors to Newham London Borough Council.

== Geography ==
The ward is named after the East Ham area.

== Councillors ==
Election	Councillors		
2022	Musawwar Alam (Labour)	Susan Masters (Labour)	Lakmini Shah (Labour)

== Elections ==
=== 2022 ===
East Ham South (3)
Party	Candidate	Votes	%	±%
Labour	Musawwar Alam	2,212	71.6	N/A
Labour	Susan Masters	2,135	69.1	N/A
Labour	Lakmini Shah	1,948	63.0	N/A
Conservative	James Clifford	479	15.5	N/A
Conservative	Manir Khan	460	14.9	N/A
Green	Max Lamptey-Harding	460	14.9	N/A
Conservative	Arthur Harwood	421	13.6	N/A
Green	Alexander McHugh	370	12.0	N/A
Green	Liam Palmer	357	11.6	N/A
TUSC	Steve Hedley	223	7.2	N/A
CPA	Amal Kakumanu	106	3.4	N/A
CPA	Sashir Kakumanu	99	3.2	N/A
Turnout		3,444	30.9	N/A
Registered electors		11,151		
Labour hold		Swing		
Labour hold		Swing		
Labour hold		Swing		

== See also ==
- List of electoral wards in Greater London
