= West Ham (ward) =

Electoral ward in London, England

- Electoral ward for the Newham London Borough Council
- Borough: Newham
- County: Greater London
- Population: 15,700 (2021)
- Major settlements: West Ham

Current electoral ward
- Created: 1965
- Seats: 3 (since 2002); 2 (until 2002)

West Ham is an electoral ward in the London Borough of Newham. The ward was first used in the 1964 elections and elects three councillors to Newham London Borough Council.

== Geography ==
The ward is named after the West Ham area.

== Councillors ==
Election	Councillors		
2022	John Gray (Labour)	Charlene McLean (Labour)	John Whitworth (Labour)

== Elections ==
=== 2022 ===
West Ham (3)
Party	Candidate	Votes	%	±%
Labour	John Gray	1,758	72.0	N/A
Labour	Charlene McLean	1,626	66.6	N/A
Labour	John Whitworth	1,458	59.7	N/A
Green	Clare Hardy	558	22.9	N/A
Green	Lyubo Ivanov	372	15.2	N/A
Green	Ben Parker	369	15.1	N/A
Conservative	Armyn Hennessy	319	13.1	N/A
Conservative	Nirali Patel	309	12.7	N/A
Conservative	Malcolm Madden	292	12.0	N/A
Liberal Democrats	Alexander Tuppen	260	10.7	N/A
Turnout		2,718	26.8	−7.0
Registered electors		10,122		
Labour hold		Swing		
Labour hold		Swing		
Labour hold		Swing		

== See also ==
- List of electoral wards in Greater London
