= Green Street West =

Electoral ward in London, England

- Electoral ward for the Newham London Borough Council
- Borough: Newham
- County: Greater London
- Population: 16,597 (2021)
- Major settlements: Green Street, Newham
- Area: 0.8050 km²

Current electoral ward
- Created: 2002
- Seats: 3

Green Street West is an electoral ward in the London Borough of Newham. The ward was first used in the 2002 elections and elects three councillors to Newham London Borough Council.

== Geography ==
The ward is named after the Green Street area of Newham.

== Councillors ==
Election	Councillors		
2022	Lewis Godfrey (Labour)	Mumtaz Khan (Labour)	Amar Virdee (Labour)

== Elections ==
=== 2022 ===
Green Street West (3)
Party	Candidate	Votes	%	±%
Labour	Lewis Godfrey	1,876	72.8	N/A
Labour	Mumtaz Khan	1,868	72.5	N/A
Labour	Amar Virdee	1,722	66.9	N/A
Conservative	Shahzad Iqbal	470	18.3	N/A
Green	Ronald Harris	427	16.6	N/A
Conservative	Ravindra Nandivelugu	388	15.1	N/A
Green	Adam Mitchell	363	14.1	N/A
Conservative	Samson Osagiede	309	12.0	N/A
Green	Joseph Sorrell-Roberts	303	11.8	N/A
Turnout		2,987	32.9	N/A
Registered electors		11,539		
Labour hold		Swing		
Labour hold		Swing		
Labour hold		Swing		

== See also ==
- List of electoral wards in Greater London
