= Manor Park (ward) =

Electoral ward in London, England

- Electoral ward for the Newham London Borough Council
- Borough: Newham
- County: Greater London
- Population: 16,307 (2021)
- Major settlements: Manor Park, London
- Area: 1.351 km²

Current electoral ward
- Created: 1965
- Seats: 3

Manor Park is an electoral ward in the London Borough of Newham. The ward was first used in the 1964 elections and elects three councillors to Newham London Borough Council.

== Geography ==
The ward is named after the Manor Park area.

== Councillors ==
| Election | Councillors | | |
|---|---|---|---|
| 2022 | Jennifer Bailey (Labour) | Mariam Dawood (Labour) | Salim Patel (Labour) |

== Elections ==
=== 2022 ===
Manor Park (3)
| Party | Candidate | Votes | % | ±% |
|---|---|---|---|---|
| Labour | Mariam Dawood | 2,271 | 73.9 | N/A |
| Labour | Salim Patel | 2,177 | 70.8 | N/A |
| Labour | Jennifer Bailey | 2,155 | 70.1 | N/A |
| Conservative | Rajan Miah | 508 | 16.5 | N/A |
| Conservative | Md Saymon | 427 | 13.9 | N/A |
| Green | Jenny Duval | 393 | 12.8 | N/A |
| Green | Rosalind Bedlow | 369 | 12.0 | N/A |
| Conservative | Silvia Troanta | 366 | 11.9 | N/A |
| Green | Deyan Atanasov | 308 | 10.0 | N/A |
| Liberal Democrats | Derek Jackson | 245 | 8.0 | N/A |
| Turnout | | 3,384 | 33.0 | N/A |
| Registered electors | | 10,247 | | |
| Labour hold | | Swing | | |
| Labour hold | | Swing | | |
| Labour hold | | Swing | | |

== See also ==
- List of electoral wards in Greater London
