= Green Street East =

Electoral ward in London, England

- Electoral ward for the Newham London Borough Council
- Borough: Newham
- County: Greater London
- Population: 17,768 (2021)
- Major settlements: Green Street, Newham
- Area: 0.7660 km²

Current electoral ward
- Created: 2002
- Seats: 3

Green Street East is an electoral ward in the London Borough of Newham. The ward was first used in the 2002 elections and elects three councillors to Newham London Borough Council.

== Geography ==
The ward is named after the Green Street area of Newham.

== Councillors ==
Election	Councillors		
2022	Miraj Patel (Labour)	Mohammed Muzibur Rahman (Labour)	Larisa Zilickaja (Labour)

== Elections ==
=== 2022 ===
Green Street East (3)
Party	Candidate	Votes	%	±%
Labour	Miraj Patel	2,347	77.6	N/A
Labour	Muzibur Rahman	2,151	71.1	N/A
Labour	Larisa Zilickaja	1,721	56.9	N/A
Conservative	Nilesh Patel	518	17.1	N/A
Conservative	Kirankumar Patel	510	16.9	N/A
Green	Tassaduqq Cheema	480	15.9	N/A
Conservative	Khatija Meaby	406	13.4	N/A
Green	Joseph Hudson-Small	400	13.2	N/A
Green	Rose Waddilove	360	11.9	N/A
TUSC	Lois Austin	185	6.1	N/A
Turnout		3,541	34.7	N/A
Registered electors		10,265		
Labour hold		Swing		
Labour hold		Swing		
Labour hold		Swing		

== See also ==
- List of electoral wards in Greater London
