= Custom House (ward) =

Electoral ward in London, England

- Electoral ward for the Newham London Borough Council
- Borough: Newham
- County: Greater London
- Population: 18,483 (2021)
- Area: 2.105 km²

Current electoral ward
- Created: 2002
- Seats: 3

Custom House is an electoral ward in the London Borough of Newham. The ward was first used in the 2002 elections and elects three councillors to Newham London Borough Council.

== Geography ==
The ward is named after the Custom House area.

== Councillors ==
Election	Councillors		
2022	James Beckles (Labour)	Sarah Ruiz (Labour)	Thelma Odoi (Labour)

== Elections ==
=== 2022 ===
Custom House (3)
Party	Candidate	Votes	%	±%
Labour	James Beckles	1,453	60.2	N/A
Labour	Sarah Ruiz	1,293	53.5	N/A
Labour	Thelma Odoi	1,284	53.2	N/A
Green	Gareth Bannister	422	17.5	N/A
Conservative	Arnold Court	411	17.0	N/A
Conservative	Mizanur Chowdhury	378	15.7	N/A
Green	Sean Labode	361	14.9	N/A
Conservative	Tim Roll-Pickering	326	13.5	N/A
Green	Rupa Sarkar	306	12.7	N/A
Liberal Democrats	Michael Fox	301	12.5	N/A
CPA	Eunice Alamu	259	10.7	N/A
CPA	Idiat Lawal	189	7.8	N/A
CPA	Kayode Shedowo	170	7.0	N/A
Reform	Kay McKenzie	93	3.9	N/A
Turnout		2,691	23.2	N/A
Registered electors		11,579		
Labour hold		Swing		
Labour hold		Swing		
Labour hold		Swing		

== See also ==
- List of electoral wards in Greater London
