= Newham London Borough Council =

Local authority in London, England

Newham London Borough Council Newham Council

Type
- Type: London borough council of the London Borough of Newham
- Houses: Unicameral

Leadership
- Chair: Nate Higgins, Green since 20 May 2026
- Mayor: Forhad Hussain, Labour since 11 May 2026
- Chief Executive: Maria Christofi since 1 August 2026

Structure
- Seats: 66 councillors plus elected mayor
- Political groups: Administration (24) Labour (24) Opposition (42) Newham Independents (18) Green (14) Independent (9)
- Joint committees: East London Waste Authority
- Length of term: Whole council elected every four years

Elections
- Voting system: Plurality at-large (FPTP)
- Last election: 7 May 2026
- Next election: 2 May 2030

Meeting place
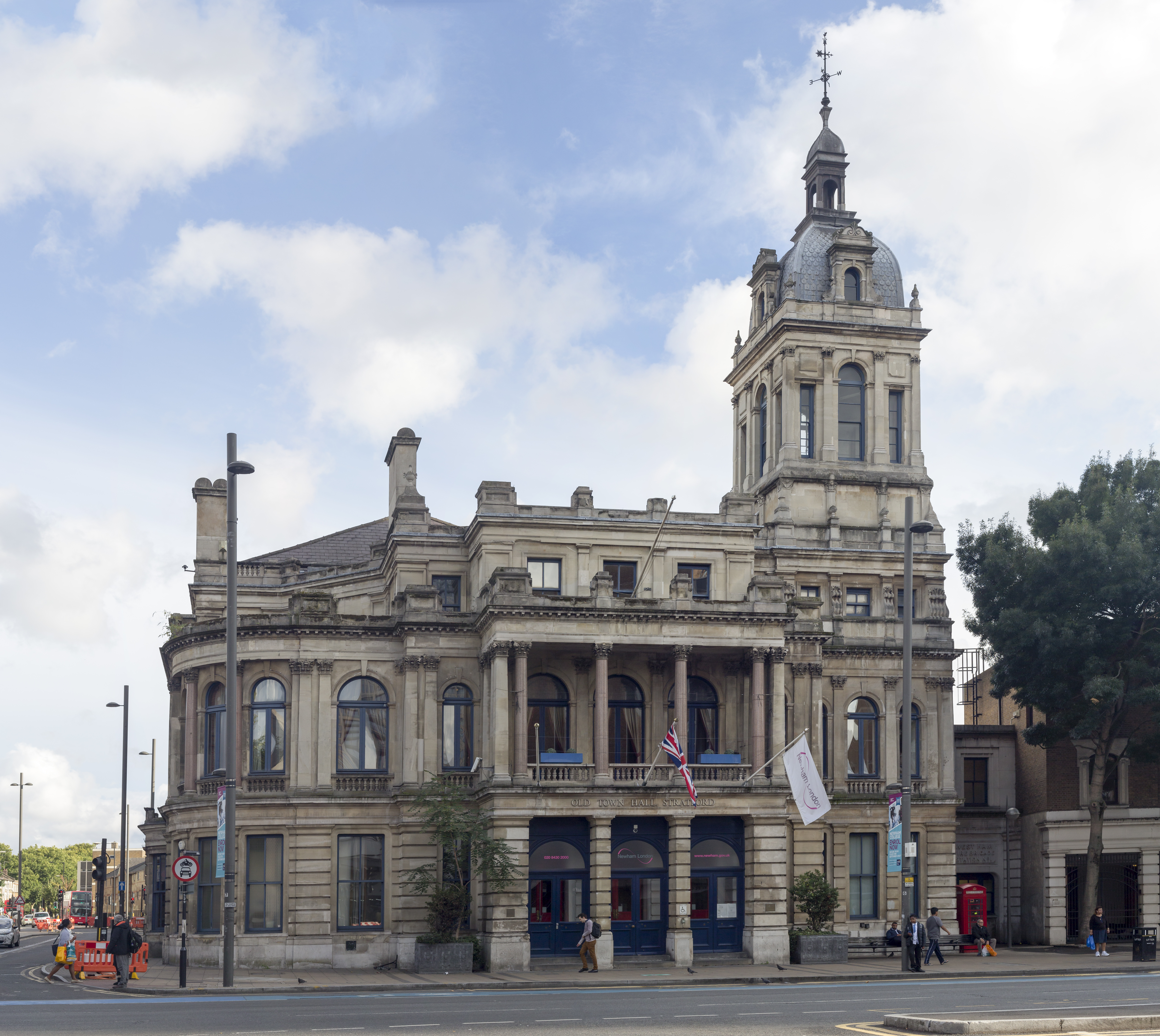
- Old Town Hall, 29 Broadway, London, E15 4BQ

Website
- www.newham.gov.uk

Newham London Borough Council /ˈnjuːəm/ also known as Newham Council, is the local authority for the London Borough of Newham in Greater London, England. The council is responsible for providing certain services within the borough. The council has been under no overall control since 8 May 2026. It has been led by a directly elected mayor since 2002. The council meets at both Newham Town Hall in East Ham and at the Old Town Hall, Stratford, and has its main offices at 1000 Dockside Road, overlooking the Royal Albert Dock.

== History ==
The London Borough of Newham and its council were created under the London Government Act 1963, with the first election held in 1964. For its first year the council acted as a shadow authority alongside the area's outgoing authorities, principally being the two councils of the county boroughs of East Ham and West Ham, but also the borough councils of Woolwich (in respect of the North Woolwich area) and Barking (in respect of the Gallions Reach area). The new council formally came into its powers on 1 April 1965, at which point the old boroughs and their councils were abolished.

From 1965 until 1986 the council was a lower-tier authority, with upper-tier functions provided by the Greater London Council. The split of powers and functions meant that the Greater London Council was responsible for "wide area" services such as fire, ambulance, flood prevention, and refuse disposal; with the boroughs (including Newham) responsible for "personal" services such as social care, libraries, cemeteries and refuse collection. As an outer London borough, Newham Council has been a local education authority since 1965. The Greater London Council was abolished in 1986 and its functions passed to the London Boroughs, with some services provided through joint committees.

Since 2000 the Greater London Authority has taken some responsibility for highways and planning control from the council, but within the English local government system the council remains a "most purpose" authority in terms of the available range of powers and functions.

== Powers and functions ==
The local authority derives its powers and functions from the London Government Act 1963 and subsequent legislation, and has the powers and functions of a London borough council. It sets council tax and as a billing authority it also collects precepts for Greater London Authority functions and business rates. It sets planning policies which complement Greater London Authority and national policies, and decides on almost all planning applications accordingly. It is also the local education authority.

== Political control ==
The council has been under no overall control since the 2026 election, having previously being under Labour majority control from 1971. The first election was held in 1964, initially operating as a shadow authority alongside the outgoing authorities until it came into its powers on 1 April 1965. Political control of the council since 1965 has been as follows:

Party in control	Years
Labour	1965–1968
No overall control	1968–1971
Labour	1971–2026
No overall control	2026–present

=== Leadership ===
Prior to 2002, political leadership was provided by the leader of the council. The leaders from 1985 to 2002 were:

Councillor	Party	From	To
Fred Jones	Labour	1985	1990
Stephen Timms	Labour	1990	1994
John Isted	Labour	1994	1995
Mike Brown	Labour	1995	1995
Robin Wales	Labour	1995	5 May 2002

In 2002 the council changed to having directly elected mayors. The mayors since 2002 have been: (Note: Mayoral terms of office run from the fourth day after polling day.)

Mayor	Party	From	To
Robin Wales	Labour	6 May 2002	6 May 2018
Rokhsana Fiaz	Labour	7 May 2018	10 May 2026
Forhad Hussain	Labour	11 May 2026	

=== Composition ===
Following the 2026 local election and a subsequent change of allegiance in July 2026, the composition of the council (excluding the elected mayor's seat) was as follows:

Party	Councillors
Labour	25
Newham Independents Party	24
Green	16
Independent	1
Total	66

The Newham Independents Party was registered as a political party in June 2024.

The next full council election is due in May 2030.

== Wards ==
The wards of Newham and the number of councillors they elect:

1. Beckton (3)
2. Boleyn (3)
3. Canning Town North (3)
4. Canning Town South (3)
5. Custom House (3)
6. East Ham (3)
7. East Ham South (3)
8. Forest Gate North (2)
9. Forest Gate South (3)
10. Green Street East (3)
11. Green Street West (3)
12. Little Ilford (3)
13. Manor Park (3)
14. Maryland (2)
15. Plaistow North (3)
16. Plaistow South (3)
17. Plaistow West & Canning Town East (3)
18. Plashet (2)
19. Royal Albert (2)
20. Royal Victoria (2)
21. Stratford (3)
22. Stratford Olympic Park (2)
23. Wall End (3)
24. West Ham (3)

== Elections ==
Since the last boundary changes in 2022 the council has comprised 66 councillors representing 24 wards, with each ward electing two or three councillors. Elections are held every four years.

== Premises ==
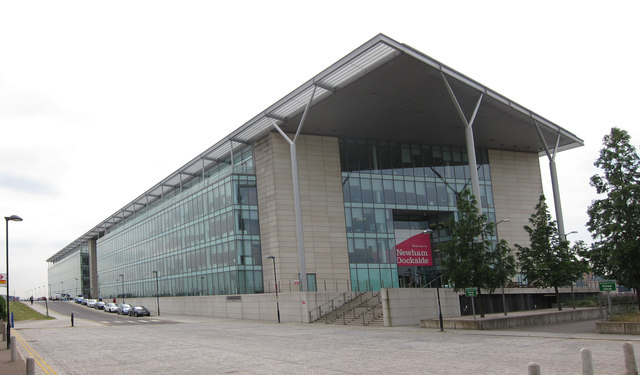
1000 Dockside Road, London, E16 2QU: Council's main offices since 2010

Full council meetings are held in the Old Town Hall, Stratford. The building was completed in 1868 for the former West Ham Local Board, predecessor of West Ham Borough Council.

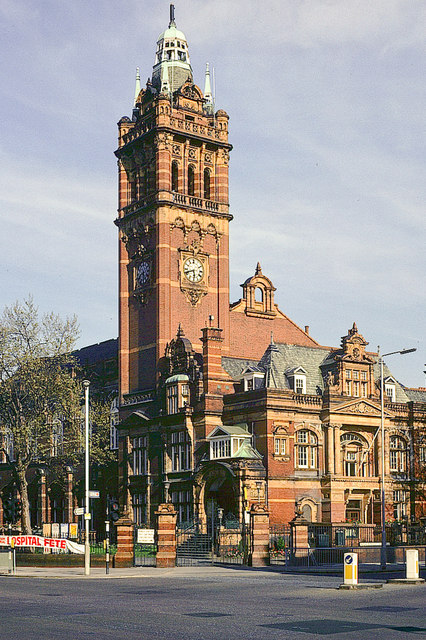
Newham Town Hall, Barking Road, London, E6 2RP

Most committees and scrutiny meetings are held in the smaller council chamber at Newham Town Hall, formerly known as East Ham Town Hall, which was completed in 1903 for the former East Ham Urban District Council, predecessor of East Ham Borough Council.

In 2010 the council consolidated most of its offices into a modern building at Newham Dockside, located at 1000 Dockside Road adjacent to the Royal Albert Dock, which had been built in 2004 as part of attempts to regenerate the area around the Royal Docks in the south of the borough. The council bought the building for £92 million after the original developers were unable to find tenants for it.

== Legal issues ==
In 2007 the Council's processes for the procurement of housing leased from private landlords were challenged by an unsuccessful tenderer, Lettings International Ltd., because, while the broad headings had been disclosed under which the Council would evaluate the tenders it received, such as price and compliance with the identified specification, and "the suitability of premises, staffing and working conditions", the relative weighting attached to various sub-criteria within these headings had not been disclosed so that tenderers could take them into account when preparing their tenders. In addition, the Council had allocated three marks out of five for tenders which met the identified specification, with higher marks only available to tenderers whose bids exceeded the specification. The High Court, in addressing the case, found that the Council had not acted with the degree of transparency required under EU and UK public procurement legislation.

A further legal case determined in 2013 between Squibb Group Ltd., London Pleasure Gardens Ltd and the Council highlighted that the Council had agreed to lend money to London Pleasure Gardens to fund the development of a site for the 2012 London Olympics, but when the London Pleasure Gardens business collapsed, the Council was able to show that neither the loan agreement nor their agreement to pay interim funding on two occasions had created a guarantee to cover missing payments due to the contractor for works completed.
