= Canning Town North =

- Electoral ward for the Newham London Borough Council
- Canning Town North ward boundaries since 2022
- Borough: Newham
- County: Greater London
- Population: 10,573 (2021) (Note: 2021 Census data reported for 2022 ward boundaries)
- Electorate: 7,023 (2022)
- Major settlements: Canning Town
- Area: 1.903 square kilometres (0.735 sq mi)

Current electoral ward
- Created: 2002
- Number of members: 3
- Councillors: Shaban Mohammed; Rita Chadha; Areeq Chowdhury
- GSS code: E05013906

Canning Town North is an electoral ward in the London Borough of Newham. The ward was first used in the 2002 elections. It returns councillors to Newham London Borough Council.

== List of councillors ==
Term	Councillor	Party
2002–2014	Marie Collier	Labour
2002–2018	Clive Furness	Labour
2002–2014	Paul Schafer	Labour
2014–2022	Ann Easter	Labour
2014–2018	Kay Scoresby	Labour
2018–present	Shaban Mohammed	Labour
2018–2022	Delphine Tohoura	Labour
2022–present	Rita Chadha	Labour
2022–present	Areeq Chowdhury (Note: Areeq Chowdhury changed parties in 2024.)	Labour
2022–present	Areeq Chowdhury	Green

== Newham Council elections since 2022 ==
=== 2022 election ===
The election took place on 5 May 2022.

2022 Newham London Borough Council election: Canning Town North (3)
Party	Candidate	Votes	%	±%
Labour	Rita Chadha	1,080	63.8	N/A
Labour	Shaban Mohammed	965	57.0	N/A
Labour	Areeq Chowdhury	937	55.3	N/A
Green	Charlotte Hurst	299	17.7	N/A
CPA	Simeon Ademolake	296	17.5	N/A
Green	Cassie Thomas	206	12.2	N/A
Independent	Linda Jordan	199	11.8	N/A
Green	Oscar Lessing	190	11.2	N/A
Conservative	Abiodun Ayeni	183	10.8	N/A
Independent	David Buxton	168	9.9	N/A
Conservative	Md Miah	145	8.6	N/A
CPA	Paul Jobson	143	8.4	N/A
CPA	Flora Amar	138	8.1	N/A
Conservative	Ahmed Faqai	131	7.7	N/A
Turnout		1,888	26.9	N/A
Registered electors		7,023		
Labour hold		Swing		
Labour hold		Swing		
Labour hold		Swing		

== 2002–2022 Newham council elections ==
Canning Town North ward boundaries from 2002 to 2022

=== 2018 election ===
The election took place on 3 May 2018.

2018 Newham London Borough Council election: Canning Town North (3)
Party	Candidate	Votes	%	±%
Labour	Ann Easter	2,586	29.0	+6.0
Labour	Shaban Mohammed	2,282	25.0	N/A
Labour	Delphine Tohoura	2,010	22.0	N/A
Conservative	Ahmed Faqai	406	4.0	N/A
Conservative	Maxwell Marah	395	4.0	±0.0
Conservative	Rachel Nabudde	341	4.0	N/A
CPA	Chishala Kumalinga	319	4.0	N/A
UKIP	Alan Craig	263	3.0	N/A
UKIP	Stuart Goodwin	249	3.0	N/A
CPA	Bapu Rani	204	2.0	N/A
Turnout		3,408	31.6	−4.3
Registered electors		10,777		
Labour hold		Swing		
Labour hold		Swing		
Labour hold		Swing		

=== 2014 election ===
The election took place on 22 May 2014.

2014 Newham London Borough Council election: Canning Town North (3)
Party	Candidate	Votes	%	±%
Labour	Ann Easter	2,036	23.0	N/A
Labour	Clive Furness	1,934	22.0	N/A
Labour	Kay Scoresby	1,835	21.0	N/A
UKIP	David Mears	635	7.0	N/A
Conservative	Wahid Ali	622	7.0	N/A
Conservative	Margaret Boateng	581	7.0	N/A
Conservative	Maxwell Marah	388	4.0	N/A
CPA	Moriam Fabode	262	3.0	N/A
CPA	Ruth Karashani	221	3.0	N/A
CPA	Charles Mrewa	196	2.0	N/A
Turnout		3,523	35.9	−4.3
Registered electors		9,827		
Labour hold		Swing		
Labour hold		Swing		
Labour hold		Swing		

=== 2010 election ===
The election on 6 May 2010 took place on the same day as the United Kingdom general election.

2010 Newham London Borough Council election: Canning Town North (3)
Party	Candidate	Votes	%	±%
Labour	Marie Collier	2,696	58.2	+3.8
Labour	Clive Furness	2,440		N/A
Labour	Paul Schafer	2,229		N/A
Conservative	Nick Reeves	747	16.1	+2.0
Conservative	Barbara Normile	681		N/A
Conservative	Rachel Nabudde	672		N/A
CPA	Keith Adams	620	13.4	−6.4
CPA	Reginald Gardener	602		N/A
Independent	Wahid Ali	566	12.2	N/A
CPA	Barbara King	545		N/A
Turnout		4,609	40.2	+12.7
Registered electors		9,147		
Labour hold		Swing		
Labour hold		Swing		
Labour hold		Swing		

=== 2006 election ===
The election took place on 4 May 2006.

2006 Newham London Borough Council election: Canning Town North (3)
Party	Candidate	Votes	%	±%
Labour	Marie Collier	1,443	54.4	+14.8
Labour	Paul Schafer	1,310		N/A
Labour	Clive Furness	1,232		N/A
CPA	Sydney Burnett	524	19.8	+6.3
CPA	John Jackson	507		N/A
Conservative	Mohammed Miah	373	14.1	N/A
Conservative	Nazrul Islam	345		N/A
CPA	Pervaiz Khan	326		N/A
Respect	Mohamed Farah	313	11.8	N/A
Respect	Sayad Mohammed	311		N/A
Conservative	Felicia Nwoye	293		N/A
Respect	Yuri Prasad	225		N/A
Turnout		2,679	27.5	+4.7
Registered electors		9,729		
Labour hold		Swing		
Labour hold		Swing		
Labour hold		Swing		

=== 2002 election ===
The election took place on 2 May 2002.

2002 Newham London Borough Council election: Canning Town North (3)
Party	Candidate	Votes	%	±%
Labour	Marie Collier	948	39.6	N/A
Labour	Clive Furness	901		N/A
Labour	Paul Schafer	784		N/A
Green	Kara Greig	426	17.8	N/A
BNP	Michael Davidson	389	16.2	N/A
CPA	Sydney Burnett	322	13.5	N/A
Independent	Edward Nkemnacho	187	7.8	N/A
Socialist Labour	Robert Siggins	122	5.1	N/A
Turnout		1,814	22.8	N/A
Registered electors		7,953		
Labour win (new seat)				
Labour win (new seat)				
Labour win (new seat)				
