= East Ham Central =

- Former electoral ward for the Newham London Borough Council
- East Ham Central ward boundaries
- Borough: Newham
- County: Greater London
- Electorate: 10,018 (2018)
- Major settlements: East Ham

Former electoral ward
- Created: 2002
- Abolished: 2022
- Councillors: 3
- Replaced by: East Ham, Wall End
- ONS code: 00BBGG
- GSS code: E05000480

East Ham Central was an electoral ward in the London Borough of Newham. The ward was first used in the 2002 elections and last used for the 2018 elections, with a by-election taking place in 2021. It returned councillors to Newham London Borough Council.

== List of councillors ==
Seat	Councillor	Took office	Left office	Party	Election
1	Mary Skyers	2002	2014	Labour	2002, 2006, 2010
2	Ian Corbett	2002	2018	Labour	2002 ... 2014
3	Unmesh Desai	2002	2018	Labour	2002 ... 2014
1	Julianne Marriott	2014	2021	Labour	2014, 2018
2	Aisha Siddiqah	2018	2022	Labour	2018
3	Suga Thekkeppurayil	2018	2022	Labour	2018
1	Farah Nazeer	2021	2022	Labour	2021

== Newham London borough council elections ==
=== 2021 by-election ===
The by-election took place on 6 May 2021, following the resignation of Julianne Marriott.

2021 East Ham Central by-election
Party	Candidate	Votes	%	±%
Labour Co-op	Farah Nazeer	2,297	54.4	N/A
Conservative	Sk Zakir Hossain	1,288	30.5	N/A
Green	Danny Keeling	283	6.7	N/A
Liberal Democrats	Ed Comaromi	239	5.7	N/A
CPA	Paul Jobson	115	2.7	N/A
TUSC	Lois Austin	91	2.1	N/A
Majority		1,009	23.9	N/A
Turnout		4,313		N/A
Labour Co-op hold		Swing		

=== 2018 election ===
The election took place on 3 May 2018.

2018 Newham London Borough Council election: East Ham Central
Party	Candidate	Votes	%	±%
Labour	Julianne Marriott	2,939	29.0	+8.0
Labour	Aisha Siddiqah	2,819	27.0	N/A
Labour	Suga Thekkeppurayil	2,568	25.0	N/A
Conservative	Rafeh Ahmed	507	5.0	N/A
Conservative	Bishwajit Bal	475	5.0	N/A
Conservative	Sabir Banglawala	427	4.0	N/A
CPA	Dominic Anthony	326	3.0	+1.0
CPA	Roja Chika	192	2.0	+1.0
Turnout		3,967	39.6	−2.9
Registered electors		10,018		
Labour hold		Swing		
Labour hold		Swing		
Labour hold		Swing		

=== 2014 election ===
The election took place on 22 May 2014.

2014 Newham London Borough Council election: East Ham Central
Party	Candidate	Votes	%	±%
Labour	Ian Corbett	2,591	22.0	N/A
Labour	Unmesh Desai	2,568	21.0	N/A
Labour	Julianne Marriott	2,525	21.0	N/A
Conservative	Mohammed Azharuddin	1,216	10.0	N/A
Conservative	Abdul Motin	1,129	9.0	N/A
Conservative	Dipti Bakshi	1,082	9.0	N/A
Liberal Democrats	David Thorpe	231	2.0	N/A
CPA	Dominic Anthony	190	2.0	N/A
CPA	Cecilia Jameson	173	1.0	N/A
TUSC	Helen Pattison	160	1.0	N/A
CPA	Roja Chikka	119	1.0	N/A
Turnout		4,091	42.5	−9.0
Registered electors		10,140		
Labour hold		Swing		
Labour hold		Swing		
Labour hold		Swing		

=== 2010 election ===
The election on 6 May 2010 took place on the same day as the United Kingdom general election.

2010 Newham London Borough Council election: East Ham Central
Party	Candidate	Votes	%	±%
Labour	Ian Corbett	3,685	63.8	+15.3
Labour	Unmesh Desai	3,641		N/A
Labour	Mary Skyers	3,562		N/A
Conservative	Ali Anwar	1,371	23.7	+9.5
Conservative	Chaudry Hussain	1,289		N/A
Conservative	Biju Gopnath	1,137		N/A
British Public Party	Kashif Rana	409	7.1	N/A
CPA	Stephen Williamson	309	5.4	−2.9
CPA	Harold Bhatty	274		N/A
CPA	Christopher Oching	225		N/A
Turnout		5,706	51.5	+13.2
Registered electors		10,327		
Labour hold		Swing		
Labour hold		Swing		
Labour hold		Swing		

=== 2006 election ===
The election took place on 4 May 2006.

2006 Newham London Borough Council election: East Ham Central
Party	Candidate	Votes	%	±%
Labour	Mary Skyers	1,821	48.5	−11.3
Labour	Ian Corbett	1,757		N/A
Labour	Unmesh Desai	1,720		N/A
Respect	Mohammed Nakhuda	1,090	29.0	N/A
Respect	Fazan Khaliq	1,086		N/A
Respect	Charanjeet Hullen	961		N/A
Conservative	Tufail Basith	535	14.2	−8.6
Conservative	Sadir Hussain	524		N/A
Conservative	Sadeque Miah	446		N/A
CPA	Harold Bhatty	310	8.3	N/A
Turnout		3,695	38.3	+8.9
Registered electors		9,650		
Labour hold		Swing		
Labour hold		Swing		
Labour hold		Swing		

=== 2002 election ===
The election took place on 2 May 2002.

2002 Newham London Borough Council election: East Ham Central
Party	Candidate	Votes	%	±%
Labour	Mary Skyers	1,538	59.8	N/A
Labour	Ian Corbett	1,479		N/A
Labour	Unmesh Desai	1,437		N/A
Conservative	Stewart Lindsay	587	22.8	N/A
Green	Diane McBrinn	446	17.3	N/A
Rejected ballots		0	0.0	N/A
Turnout		2,406	29.4	N/A
Registered electors		8,188		
Labour win (new seat)				
Labour win (new seat)				
Labour win (new seat)				
