= Forest Gate North =

- Electoral ward for the Newham London Borough Council
- Forest Gate North ward boundaries since 2022
- Borough: Newham
- County: Greater London
- Population: 10,987 (2021) (Note: 2021 Census data reported for 2022 ward boundaries)
- Electorate: 7,246 (2022)
- Major settlements: Forest Gate
- Area: 0.8705 square kilometres (0.3361 sq mi)

Current electoral ward
- Created: 2002
- Number of members: 2002–2022: 3; 2022–present: 2
- Councillors: Rachel Tripp; Liz Cronin
- GSS code: E05000483 (2002–2022); E05013911 (2022–present)

Forest Gate North is an electoral ward in the London Borough of Newham. The ward was first used in the 2002 elections. It returns councillors to Newham London Borough Council.

== Geography ==
The ward is based on the northern areas of Forest Gate. The southern parts are in the Forest Gate South ward.

== List of councillors ==
Term	Councillor	Party
2002–2014	Paul Brickell	Labour
2002–2006	John Saunders	Labour
2002–2014	Shama Ahmad	Labour
2006–2010	Michael Nicholas	Labour
2010–2016	Ellie Robinson	Labour
2014–2018	Seyi Akiwowo	Labour
2014–present	Rachel Tripp	Labour
2016–2022	Anamul Islam	Labour
2018–2024	Sasha Das Gupta	Labour
2024–present	Liz Cronin	Labour

== Newham council elections since 2022 ==
There was a revision of ward boundaries in Newham in 2022. The Forest Gate North ward lost territory in the west to the new ward of Maryland and the number of councillors representing Forest Gate North was reduced from three to two.

=== 2024 by-election ===
The by-election on 4 July 2024 took place on the same day as the United Kingdom general election. It followed the resignation of Sasha Das Gupta.

2024 Forest Gate North by-election
Party	Candidate	Votes	%	±%
Labour	Liz Cronin	1,757		
Independent	Zakaria Bhariwala	1073		
Green	Zahra Kheyre	810		
Conservative	Malcolm Madden	251		
Liberal Democrats	Jamie Bryant	192		
Turnout				
Labour hold		Swing		

=== 2022 election ===
The election took place on 5 May 2022.

2022 Newham London Borough Council election: Forest Gate North (2)
Party	Candidate	Votes	%	±%
Labour	Rachel Tripp	1,366	66.1	N/A
Labour	Sasha Das Gupta	1,268	61.4	N/A
Green	Gary Pendlebury	435	21.1	N/A
Green	Michael Spracklin	388	18.8	N/A
Conservative	Fokoruddin Ahmed	284	13.7	N/A
Liberal Democrats	Philip Reynolds	201	9.7	N/A
Conservative	Ellis Hudson	189	9.2	N/A
Turnout		2,373	32.7	N/A
Registered electors		7,246		
Labour win (new boundaries)				
Labour win (new boundaries)				

== 2002–2022 Newham council elections ==
Forest Gate North ward boundaries from 2002 to 2022

=== 2018 election ===
The election took place on 3 May 2018.

2018 Newham London Borough Council election: Forest Gate North (3)
Party	Candidate	Votes	%	±%
Labour	Rachel Tripp	2,425	24.0	N/A
Labour	Sasha Das Gupta	2,346	23.0	N/A
Labour	Anamul Islam	2,070	20.0	N/A
Green	Nate Higgins	743	7.0	N/A
Green	Frankie-Rose Taylor	729	7.0	N/A
Green	Michael Spracklin	606	6.0	N/A
Liberal Democrats	Christian Moon	399	4.0	+2.0
Conservative	Abdul Chowdhury	327	3.0	N/A
Conservative	Brian Maze	314	3.0	−2.0
Conservative	Ariful Islam	281	3.0	N/A
Turnout		3,835	37.8	−0.9
Registered electors		10,140		
Labour hold		Swing		
Labour hold		Swing		
Labour hold		Swing		

=== 2016 by-election ===
The by-election took place on 14 July 2016, following the resignation of Ellie Robinson.

2016 Forest Gate North by-election
Party	Candidate	Votes	%	±%
Labour	Anamul Islam	1,150	53	−5.1
Green	Elisabeth Whitebread	681	31	+17.2
Conservative	John Oxley	301	14	+0.2
Liberal Democrats	James Rumsby	57	3	−2.5
Majority				
Turnout		2,189	21	
Labour hold		Swing		

=== 2014 election ===
The election took place on 22 May 2014.

2014 Newham London Borough Council election: Forest Gate North (3)
Party	Candidate	Votes	%	±%
Labour	Ellie Robinson	2,324	23.0	N/A
Labour	Seyi Akiwowo	2,126	21.0	N/A
Labour	Rachel Tripp	2,120	21.0	N/A
Green	Alan Cooper	562	6.0	N/A
Green	Jane Lithgow	559	6.0	N/A
Conservative	Shaeb Khan	548	6.0	N/A
Conservative	Dawn Lennon	490	5.0	N/A
Conservative	Brian Maze	480	5.0	N/A
TUSC	Bob Severn	222	2.0	N/A
Liberal Democrats	Christian Moon	206	2.0	N/A
CPA	Lynn Donaldson	174	2.0	N/A
CPA	Christina Doyle	146	1.0	N/A
Turnout		3,866	38.7	−10.6
Registered electors		9,981		
Labour hold		Swing		
Labour hold		Swing		
Labour hold		Swing		

=== 2010 election ===
The election on 6 May 2010 took place on the same day as the United Kingdom general election.

2010 Newham London Borough Council election: Forest Gate North (3)
Party	Candidate	Votes	%	±%
Labour	Paul Brickell	3,652	60.2	+17.9
Labour	Ellie Robinson	3,631		N/A
Labour	Shama Ahmad	3,335		N/A
Green	Jane Lithgow	905	14.9	−0.3
Conservative	Brian Maze	836	13.8	+0.8
Conservative	Charles Meaby	730		N/A
Conservative	Ulla Mahaka	710		N/A
CPA	Sydney Burnett	411	6.8	−3.5
CPA	Tom Conquest	347		N/A
Independent	Manpreet Singh	267	4.4	N/A
Turnout		5,509	49.3	+14.0
Registered electors		10,053		
Labour hold		Swing		
Labour hold		Swing		
Labour hold		Swing		

=== 2006 election ===
The election took place on 4 May 2006.

2006 Newham London Borough Council election: Forest Gate North (3)
Party	Candidate	Votes	%	±%
Labour	Paul Brickell	1,678	42.3	+5.1
Labour	Michael Nicholas	1,552		N/A
Labour	Shama Ahmad	1,443		N/A
Respect	Muhammed Ahmed	757	19.1	N/A
Respect	Imran Mustak	720		N/A
Respect	April Williams	673		N/A
Green	Jane Lithgow	603	15.2	−7.1
Conservative	Jacqueline Burns	517	13.0	+0.8
Conservative	Charles Meaby	454		N/A
Conservative	Brian Maze	418		N/A
CPA	Stephen Williamson	409	10.3	N/A
Turnout		3,378	35.3	+8.7
Registered electors		9,558		
Labour hold		Swing		
Labour hold		Swing		
Labour hold		Swing		

=== 2002 election ===
The election took place on 2 May 2002.

2002 Newham London Borough Council election: Forest Gate North (3)
Party	Candidate	Votes	%	±%
Labour	Paul Brickell	1,333	47.4	N/A
Labour	John Saunders	1,265		N/A
Labour	Shama Ahmad	1,253		N/A
Green	Mary Forse	628	22.3	N/A
Conservative	Charles Meaby	344	12.2	N/A
Socialist Alliance	Paul Phillips	272	9.7	N/A
UKIP	Gerard Batten	233	8.3	N/A
Turnout		2,200	26.6	N/A
Registered electors		8,287		
Labour win (new seat)				
Labour win (new seat)				
Labour win (new seat)				
