= Canning Town South (ward) =

- Electoral ward for the Newham London Borough Council
- Canning Town South ward boundaries since 2022
- Borough: Newham
- County: Greater London
- Population: 7,122 (2021) (Note: 2021 Census data reported for 2022 ward boundaries)
- Electorate: 5,003 (2022)
- Major settlements: Canning Town
- Area: 0.6693 square kilometres (0.2584 sq mi)

Current electoral ward
- Created: 2002
- Number of members: 3
- Councillors: Alan Griffiths; Rohit Dasgupta; Belgica Guana
- GSS code: E05013907

Canning Town South is an electoral ward in the London Borough of Newham. The ward was first used in the 2002 elections. It returns councillors to Newham London Borough Council.

== List of councillors ==
Term	Councillor	Party
2002–2010	Alan Craig	CPA
2002–2006; 2010-2014	Alan Taylor	Labour
2002–2006	Maureen Jones	Labour
2006–2010	Denise Stafford	CPA
2006–2010	Simeon Ademolake	CPA
2010–2018	Bryan Collier	Labour
2010–2014	Michael Nicholas	Labour
2014–2018	Sheila Thomas	Labour
2014–present	Alan Griffiths	Labour
2018–present	Belgica Guana	Independent
2018–present	Rohit Dasgupta	Labour

== Newham Council elections since 2022 ==
=== 2022 election ===
The election took place on 5 May 2022.

2022 Newham London Borough Council election: Canning Town South (3)
Party	Candidate	Votes	%	±%
Labour	Rohit Dasgupta	630		
Labour	Alan Griffiths	585		
Labour	Belgica Guana	536		
Independent	Carel Buxton	187		
Green	Oliver Reynolds	185		
Green	Deb Scott	161		
Independent	Darshi Wijesinghe	155		
Conservative	Tim Gamble	144		
Conservative	Marc Pooler	122		
Green	Benjamin Smith	106		
Conservative	Rachel Nabudde	103		
CPA	Myrtle Laing	74		
CPA	Sharmila Swarna	54		
CPA	Prossy Namwanje	50		
Turnout				
Labour win (new boundaries)				
Labour win (new boundaries)				
Labour win (new boundaries)				

== 2002–2022 Newham council elections ==
Canning Town South ward boundaries from 2002 to 2022

=== 2018 election ===
The election took place on 3 May 2018.

2018 Newham London Borough Council election: Canning Town South (3)
Party	Candidate	Votes	%	±%
Labour	Alan Griffiths	1,991		
Labour	Rohit Dasgupta	1,965		
Labour	Belgica Guana	1,693		
Liberal Democrats	Caroline Carey	652		
Conservative	Marc Pooler	643		
Conservative	Mark Seymour	559		
Green	Danny Keeling	464		
Conservative	Mahyar Tousi	378		
CPA	Myrtle Laing	222		
CPA	Sharmila Swarna	145		
CPA	Prossy Namwanje	144		
Turnout			28.2	
Registered electors		11,749		
Labour hold		Swing		
Labour hold		Swing		
Labour hold		Swing		

=== 2014 election ===
The election took place on 22 May 2014.

2014 Newham London Borough Council election: Canning Town South (3)
Party	Candidate	Votes	%	±%
Labour	Bryan Collier	1,896		
Labour	Alan Griffiths	1,600		
Labour	Sheila Thomas	1,581		
UKIP	Kay McKenzie	657		
Conservative	Abul Mohammed	632		
Conservative	Gareth Knight	537		
Conservative	Jaja Rachel	420		
CPA	Faith Johnson	387		
CPA	Benjamin Stafford	279		
CPA	Ethel Odiete	237		
Turnout			33.0	
Registered electors		10,170		
Labour hold		Swing		
Labour hold		Swing		
Labour hold		Swing		

=== 2010 election ===
The election on 6 May 2010 took place on the same day as the United Kingdom general election.

2010 Newham London Borough Council election: Canning Town South (3)
Party	Candidate	Votes	%	±%
Labour	Bryan Collier	2,263		
Labour	Alan Taylor	2,074		
Labour	Michael Nicholas	2,028		
CPA	Alan Craig	1,399		
CPA	Denise Stafford	1,004		
CPA	Hamilton Amachree	892		
Conservative	Christopher Buckwell	858		
Conservative	Gareth Knight	794		
Conservative	Abul Kashem	721		
Turnout			43.8	
Registered electors		9,187		
Labour gain from CPA		Swing		
Labour gain from CPA		Swing		
Labour gain from CPA		Swing		

=== 2006 election ===
The election took place on 4 May 2006.

2006 Newham London Borough Council election: Canning Town South (3)
Party	Candidate	Votes	%	±%
CPA	Alan Craig	1,536		
CPA	Denise Stafford	1,170		
CPA	Simeon Ademolake	1,091		
Labour	Bryan Collier	927		
Labour	Alan Griffiths	887		
Labour	Julie Sussex	855		
Conservative	Christopher Buckwell	332		
Conservative	Abul Abdul	306		
Respect	Khadija Hassan	225		
Conservative	Bakary Ceesay	193		
Respect	Mohammed Rob	193		
Respect	Berlyne Hamilton	192		
Turnout			32.8	
Registered electors		8,661		
CPA hold		Swing		
CPA gain from Labour		Swing		
CPA gain from Labour		Swing		

=== 2002 election ===
The election took place on 2 May 2002.

2002 Newham London Borough Council election: Canning Town South (3)
Party	Candidate	Votes	%	±%
CPA	Alan Craig	959		
Labour	Alan Taylor	946		
Labour	Maureen Jones	887		
Labour	Simon Tucker	808		
CPA	Benjamin Stafford	739		
CPA	Rose Irtwangejibril	525		
Turnout			26.2	
Registered electors		7,601		
CPA win (new seat)				
Labour win (new seat)				
Labour win (new seat)				
