= 2002 Newham London Borough Council election =

2002 local election in England

2002 Newham Council election
- 2 May 2002

All 60 council seats to Newham London Borough Council 31 seats needed for a majority
- Registered: 157,504
- Turnout: 42,567
	First party	Second party
Party	Labour	CPA
Last election	60 seats	0 seats
Seats won	59	1
Seat change	▼1	▲1
Popular vote	23,965	2,178
Percentage	49.3	4.5
- Map of the results of the 2002 Newham council election. Christian Peoples Alliance in purple and Labour in red.
Council control before election
Labour
Council control after election
Labour

Elections to Newham London Borough Council were held on 2 May 2002. The whole council was up for election. Turnout was 25.49%. Labour won all but one seat. The sole opposition councillor was Alan Craig of the Christian Peoples Alliance.

== Background ==
A total of 144 candidates stood in the election for the 60 seats being contested across 20 wards. Candidates included a full slate from the Labour Party (as had been the case at every election since the borough council had been formed in 1964), whilst the Conservative Party ran 31 candidates and the Liberal Democrats ran 7 candidates. Other candidates running were 14 Greens, 9 Christian Peoples Alliance, 6 Newham Independents Association, 4 Socialist Alliance, 3 BNP, 1 Socialist Labour, 1 UKIP and 8 Independents.

=== Ward Changes ===
As with several other councils this election, Newham went through a major redistricting which resulted in the following changes:

==== Wards Eliminated ====
- Bemersyde (2)
- Custom House and Silvertown (3)
- Castle (2)
- Central (2)
- Greatfield (3)
- Hudsons (3)
- Kensington (2)
- Monega (2)
- Ordnance (2)
- Park (3)
- Plashet (3)
- St Stephens (2)
- South (3)
- Upton (3)

==== Wards Created ====
- Boleyn (3)
- Custom House (3)
- East Ham Central (3)
- East Ham North (3)
- East Ham South (3)
- Green Street East (3)
- Green Street West (3)
- Royal Docks (3)

==== Wards Merged ====
- Stratford (2) and New Town (2) wards merged into Stratford and New Town (3)

==== Wards Divided ====
- Canning Town and Grange (2) - Split into Canning Town North (3) and Canning Town South (3) wards
- Plaistow (3) - Split into Plaistow North (3) and Plaistow South (3) wards.
- Forest Gate (3) - Split into Forest Gate North (3) and Forest Gate South (3) wards

==== Wards Expanded ====
- Beckton - Increased from 2 seats to 3
- West Ham - Increased from 2 seats to 3

== Election result ==
Newham local election result 2002
Party	Seats	Gains	Losses	Net gain/loss	Seats %	Votes %	Votes	+/−
Labour	59	0	1	▼1	98.3	62.6	57,324	▼11.7
CPA	1	1	0	▲1	1.7	3.9	3,545	New
Conservative	0	0	0	Steady	0.0	17.2	15,785	▲3.7
Green	0	0	0	Steady	0.0	6.5	5,993	New
Liberal Democrats	0	0	0	Steady	0.0	3.1	2,820	▼10.4
Independent	0	0	0	Steady	0.0	2.3	2,148	▲0.8
Newham Independents	0	0	0	Steady	0.0	2.1	1,931	▼1.0
Socialist Alliance	0	0	0	Steady	0.0	1.0	906	New
BNP	0	0	0	Steady	0.0	0.8	736	▼1.8
UKIP	0	0	0	Steady	0.0	0.2	233	New
Socialist Labour	0	0	0	Steady	0.0	0.1	122	New
Total	60						91,543	

== Results by ward ==
(*) - Indicates an incumbent candidate (†) - Indicates an incumbent candidate standing in a candidate

=== Beckton ===
Beckton (3)
Party	Candidate	Votes	%	±%
Labour	Alec Kellaway	945	43.8	N/A
Labour	Ayesha Chowdhury	930		N/A
Labour	Christopher Seddon	860		N/A
Liberal Democrats	Stephen Bell	369	17.1	N/A
Conservative	Damian Sutton	348	16.1	N/A
Green	Nick Davies	277	12.8	N/A
BNP	Margaret Stones	217	10.1	N/A
Rejected ballots		0	0.0	N/A
Turnout		1,648	21.4	N/A
Registered electors		7,721		
Labour hold		Swing		
Labour hold		Swing		
Labour hold		Swing		

=== Boleyn ===
Boleyn (3)
Party	Candidate	Votes	%	±%
Labour	June Leitch^{†} (Note: Leitch was a sitting councillor representing the former Central ward)	1,321	49.0	N/A
Labour	Sardar Ali	1,224		N/A
Labour	Joseph Ejiofor	1,122		N/A
Conservative	Elaine Sutton	579	21.5	N/A
Green	Marya Spence	507	18.8	N/A
CPA	Joy Shekarau-Jibril	289	10.7	N/A
Rejected ballots		0	0.0	N/A
Turnout		2,224	27.5	N/A
Registered electors		8,095		
Labour hold		Swing		
Labour hold		Swing		
Labour hold		Swing		

=== Canning Town North ===
Canning Town North (3)
Party	Candidate	Votes	%	±%
Labour	Marie Collier	948	39.6	N/A
Labour	Clive Furness^{†} (Note: Furness was a sitting councillor representing former Canning Town and Grange ward)	901		N/A
Labour	Paul Schafer	784		N/A
Green	Kara Greig	426	17.8	N/A
BNP	Michael Davidson	389	16.2	N/A
CPA	Sydney Burnett	322	13.5	N/A
Independent	Edward Nkemnacho	187	7.8	N/A
Socialist Labour	Robert Siggins	122	5.1	N/A
Rejected ballots		0	0.0	N/A
Turnout		1,814	22.8	N/A
Registered electors		7,953		
Labour hold		Swing		
Labour hold		Swing		
Labour hold		Swing		

=== Canning Town South ===
Canning Town South (3)
Party	Candidate	Votes	%	±%
CPA	Alan Craig	959	50.3	N/A
Labour	Alan Taylor	946	49.7	N/A
Labour	Maureen Jones	887		N/A
Labour	Simon Tucker	808		N/A
CPA	Benjamin Stafford	739		N/A
CPA	Rose Irtwangejibril	525		N/A
Rejected ballots		0	0.0	N/A
Turnout		1,988	26.2	N/A
Registered electors		7,601		
CPA gain from Labour		Swing		
Labour hold		Swing		
Labour hold		Swing		

=== Custom House ===
Custom House (3)
Party	Candidate	Votes	%	±%
Labour	Patricia Holland	887	47.3	N/A
Labour	Ronald Manley	765		N/A
Labour	Conor McAuley^{†} (Note: McAuley was a sitting councillor representing the former Forest Gate ward)	709		N/A
Conservative	Paul Maynard	519	27.7	N/A
Conservative	James Clark	467		N/A
Conservative	Douglas Taylor	416		N/A
Green	Mary Robinson	240	12.8	N/A
CPA	Bolanie Shasanmi	229	12.2	N/A
Rejected ballots		0	0.0	N/A
Turnout		1,654	20.3	N/A
Registered electors		8,140		
Labour hold		Swing		
Labour hold		Swing		
Labour hold		Swing		

=== East Ham Central ===
East Ham Central (3)
Party	Candidate	Votes	%	±%
Labour	Mary Skyers^{†} (Note: Skyers was a sitting councillor representing the former Central ward)	1,538	59.8	N/A
Labour	Ian Corbett^{†} (Note: Corbett was a sitting councillor representing the former Greatfield ward)	1,479		N/A
Labour	Unmesh Desai	1,437		N/A
Conservative	Stewart Lindsay	587	22.8	N/A
Green	Diane McBrinn	446	17.3	N/A
Rejected ballots		0	0.0	N/A
Turnout		2,406	29.4	N/A
Registered electors		8,188		
Labour hold		Swing		
Labour hold		Swing		
Labour hold		Swing		

=== East Ham North ===
East Ham North (3)
Party	Candidate	Votes	%	±%
Labour	Sukhdev Marway	1,367	38.2	N/A
Labour	Lester Hudson	1,248		N/A
Labour	Patricia Sheekey	1,244		N/A
Conservative	Mohammed Akram	896	25.0	N/A
Independent	Swaminathan Balakrishnan	578	16.1	N/A
Liberal Democrats	Kathleen King	313	8.7	N/A
Green	Gary Hewett	252	7.0	N/A
Socialist Alliance	Berlyne Hamilton	177	4.9	N/A
Rejected ballots		0	0.0	N/A
Turnout		2,732	34.6	N/A
Registered electors		7,905		
Labour hold		Swing		
Labour hold		Swing		
Labour hold		Swing		

=== East Ham South ===
East Ham South (3)
Party	Candidate	Votes	%	±%
Labour	Kevin Jenkins^{†} (Note: Jenkins was a sitting councillor representing the former Greatfield ward)	1,244	53.3	N/A
Labour	Quintin Peppiatt	1,081		N/A
Labour	Pearson Shillingford	981		N/A
Conservative	Linda Lindsay	586	25.1	N/A
Newham Independent	Frederick Jones	503	21.6	N/A
Rejected ballots		0	0.0	N/A
Turnout		1,953	24.6	N/A
Registered electors		7,957		
Labour hold		Swing		
Labour hold		Swing		
Labour hold		Swing		

=== Forest Gate North ===
Forest Gate North (3)
Party	Candidate	Votes	%	±%
Labour	Paul Brickell^{†} (Note: Brickell and Ahmad were both sitting councillors representing the former Forest Gate ward)	1,333	47.4	N/A
Labour	John Saunders	1,265		N/A
Labour	Shama Ahmad^{†}	1,253		N/A
Green	Mary Forse	628	22.3	N/A
Conservative	Charles Meaby	344	12.2	N/A
Socialist Alliance	Paul Phillips	272	9.7	N/A
UKIP	Gerard Batten	233	8.3	N/A
Rejected ballots		0	0.0	N/A
Turnout		2,200	26.6	N/A
Registered electors		8,287		
Labour hold		Swing		
Labour hold		Swing		
Labour hold		Swing		

=== Forest Gate South ===
Forest Gate South (3)
Party	Candidate	Votes	%	±%
Labour	Akbar Chaudhary	1,274	54.3	N/A
Labour	Alan Griffiths	1,142		N/A
Labour	Winston Vaughan	1,102		N/A
Liberal Democrats	John Gray	472	20.1	N/A
Liberal Democrats	Patricia Mahoney	460		N/A
Liberal Democrats	Christopher Lomax	443		N/A
Conservative	Brian Maze	323	13.8	N/A
Socialist Alliance	Mubin Haq	276	11.8	N/A
Rejected ballots		0	0.0	N/A
Turnout		2,189	26.5	N/A
Registered electors		8,272		
Labour hold		Swing		
Labour hold		Swing		
Labour hold		Swing		

=== Green Street East ===
Green Street East (3)
Party	Candidate	Votes	%	±%
Labour	Lyn Brown^{†} (Note: Brown was a sitting councillor representing the former Custom House and Silvertown ward)	1,488	52.3	N/A
Labour	Mahmood Ahmad	1,403		N/A
Labour	Abdul Shakoor	1,319		N/A
Conservative	Abdullah Atcha	635	22.3	N/A
Independent	Nazma Uddin	381	13.4	N/A
Green	Sandra Springall	341	12.0	N/A
Independent	Giash Talukdar	299		N/A
Rejected ballots		0	0.0	N/A
Turnout		2,552	32.2	N/A
Registered electors		7,922		
Labour hold		Swing		
Labour hold		Swing		
Labour hold		Swing		

=== Green Street West ===
Green Street West (3)
Party	Candidate	Votes	%	±%
Labour	Abdul Sheikh	1,594	57.1	N/A
Labour	Rustam Talati	1,448		N/A
Labour	Harvinder Virdee	1,439		N/A
Conservative	Reza Choudhury	826	29.6	N/A
Green	John Widdowson	371	13.3	N/A
Rejected ballots		0	0.0	N/A
Turnout		2,497	31.5	N/A
Registered electors		7,930		
Labour hold		Swing		
Labour hold		Swing		
Labour hold		Swing		

=== Little Ilford ===
Little Ilford (3)
Party	Candidate	Votes	%	±%
Labour	Josephine Corbett	1,086	49.1	N/A
Labour	Andrew Baikie	1,063		N/A
Labour	Richard Crawford	1,052		N/A
Conservative	Akmul Choudhury	869	39.3	N/A
Conservative	Faizur Rahman	844		N/A
Conservative	Harun Rashid	795		N/A
Green	Mee Lee	257	11.6	N/A
Rejected ballots		0	0.0	N/A
Turnout		2,175	26.8	N/A
Registered electors		8,126		
Labour hold		Swing		
Labour hold		Swing		
Labour hold		Swing		

=== Manor Park ===
Manor Park (3)
Party	Candidate	Votes	%	±%
Labour	Amarjit Singh	1,236	46.0	N/A
Labour	Christine Bowden	1,219		N/A
Labour	Khalilur Kazi	1,149		N/A
Conservative	Mahbub Ahmed	1,009	37.5	N/A
Conservative	Shahidur Chowdhury	968		N/A
Conservative	Kaisar Jalal	890		N/A
Green	Ronald Smith	444	16.5	N/A
Rejected ballots		0	0.0	N/A
Turnout		2,732	34.2	N/A
Registered electors		7,986		
Labour hold		Swing		
Labour hold		Swing		
Labour hold		Swing		

=== Plaistow North ===
Plaistow North (3)
Party	Candidate	Votes	%	±%
Labour	Regina Williams	1,224	50.4	N/A
Labour	Riaz Mirza	1,163		N/A
Labour	Joy Laguda	1,110		N/A
Independent	Frederick Warwick	507	20.9	N/A
Green	Jacqueline Chandler-Oatts	356	14.7	N/A
Conservative	Johanna Watson	342	14.1	N/A
Conservative	Anthoulla Osben	278		N/A
Rejected ballots		0	0.0	N/A
Turnout		2,059	27.1	N/A
Registered electors		7,612		
Labour hold		Swing		
Labour hold		Swing		
Labour hold		Swing		

=== Plaistow South ===
Plaistow South (3)
Party	Candidate	Votes	%	±%
Labour	Neil Wilson	1,180	50.0	N/A
Labour	Graham Lane	1,138		N/A
Labour	Bryan Collier	1,064		N/A
Conservative	Jacqueline Burns	374	15.8	N/A
Conservative	Barry Roberts	355		N/A
Green	Gabrielle Rolfe	340	14.4	N/A
Liberal Democrats	Jamieson Moore	320	13.6	N/A
Conservative	Danuta Gradosielska	263		N/A
Newham Independent	Josephine Phillips	147	6.2	N/A
Newham Independent	Donald Freeman	139		N/A
Rejected ballots		0	0.0	N/A
Turnout		2,101	25.0	N/A
Registered electors		8,391		
Labour hold		Swing		
Labour hold		Swing		
Labour hold		Swing		

=== Royal Docks ===
Royal Docks (3)
Party	Candidate	Votes	%	±%
Labour	Michael Law	433	39.3	N/A
Labour	Victor Turner^{†} (Note: Turner was a sitting councillor representing the former Bemersyde (ward))	398		N/A
Labour	Sarah Ruiz^{†} (Note: Ruiz was a sitting councillor representing the Beckton ward)	346		N/A
Independent	Ayotunde Thanni	196	17.8	N/A
Conservative	Graham Postles	175	15.9	N/A
CPA	Beatrice Appiah	168	15.2	N/A
Conservative	Glyn Weare	159		N/A
BNP	Mark Lond	130	11.8	N/A
CPA	Funmike Daodu	103		N/A
Rejected ballots		0	0.0	N/A
Turnout		910	19.8	N/A
Registered electors		4,609		
Labour hold		Swing		
Labour hold		Swing		
Labour hold		Swing		

=== Stratford and New Town ===
Stratford and New Town (3)
Party	Candidate	Votes	%	±%
Labour	Judith Garfield	1,163	54.2	N/A
Labour	David Griffin	1,090		N/A
Labour	Anthony McAlmont	938		N/A
Green	O Oisin	398	18.5	N/A
Conservative	Richard Arnopp	374	17.4	N/A
Conservative	Armyn Hennessy	330		N/A
Conservative	Nigel Nadolski	286		N/A
CPA	Victoria Wya	211	9.8	N/A
Rejected ballots		0	0.0	N/A
Turnout		1,907	23.0	N/A
Registered electors		8,561		
Labour hold		Swing		
Labour hold		Swing		
Labour hold		Swing		

=== Wall End ===
Wall End (3)
Party	Candidate	Votes	%	±%
Labour	Paul Sathianesan	1,608	55.7	N/A
Labour	Edward Sparrowhawk	1,426		N/A
Labour	Omanakutty Gangadharan	1,350		N/A
Conservative	Zubaida Hashmi	433	15.0	N/A
Newham Independent	Terence Aird	410	14.2	N/A
Conservative	Leslie Smith	400	16.5	N/A
Newham Independent	David Piper	373		N/A
Newham Independent	Trudy Cannon	359		N/A
Green	Howard Mendick	257	8.9	N/A
Socialist Alliance	Robert Davies	181	6.3	N/A
Rejected ballots		0	0.0	N/A
Turnout		2,911	34.0	N/A
Registered electors		8,561		
Labour hold		Swing		
Labour hold		Swing		
Labour hold		Swing		

=== West Ham ===
West Ham (3)
Party	Candidate	Votes	%	±%
Labour	John Whitworth	1,150	45.9	N/A
Labour	Megan Harris	1,057		N/A
Labour	Murtland Inverary	965		N/A
Conservative	Josephine Child	459	18.3	N/A
Green	Rita Reale	453	18.1	N/A
Liberal Democrats	Kathleen Chater	443	17.7	N/A
Rejected ballots		0	0.0	N/A
Turnout		1,915	24.1	N/A
Registered electors		7,959		
Labour hold		Swing		
Labour hold		Swing		
Labour hold		Swing		

== By-elections between 2002 and 2006 ==
There were no by-elections.
