= Plaistow =

Plaistow may refer to:

== Places ==
=== England ===
- Plaistow, Bromley, south east London
  - Plaistow (Bromley ward)
- Plaistow, Derbyshire, in the List of places in Derbyshire
- Plaistow, Newham, east London
  - Plaistow (UK Parliament constituency), a parliamentary constituency from 1918 to 1950 within what has since become Newham
  - Plaistow (Newham ward), an electoral ward in Newham from 1964 until 2002
  - Plaistow North (ward), an electoral ward in Newham created in 2002
  - Plaistow South (ward), an electoral ward in Newham created in 2002
  - Plaistow tube station, a London Underground station in Newham
- Plaistow, West Sussex, a village and civil parish in Chichester district
  - Plaistow (Chichester ward), a former ward of Chichester
- Plaistow Green, Greenstead Green and Halstead Rural, Essex
- Plaistow Green, part of Cranbourne, a village near Windsor, Berkshire

=== United States ===
- Plaistow, New Hampshire
- Plaistow Carhouse, a barn in Plaistow, New Hampshire

== Other uses ==
- Jeffrey Sterling, Baron Sterling of Plaistow (born 1934), UK life peer with land in Sussex
