= Little Ilford (ward) =

- Electoral ward for the Newham London Borough Council
- Little Ilford ward boundaries since 2022
- Borough: Newham
- County: Greater London
- Population: 17,547 (2021) (Note: 2021 Census data reported for 2022 ward boundaries)
- Electorate: 11,539 (2022)
- Area: 1.935 square kilometres (0.747 sq mi)

Current electoral ward
- Created: 1965
- Number of members: 3
- Councillors: Syed Bashar; Nur Begum; Aktharul Alam
- GSS code: E05013915 (2022–present)

Little Ilford is an electoral ward in the London Borough of Newham. The ward was first used in the 1964 elections. It returns councillors to Newham London Borough Council.

== Newham council elections since 2022 ==
There was a revision of ward boundaries in Newham in 2022.

=== 2024 by-election ===
The by-election took place on 18 July 2024, following the resignation of Elizabeth Booker.

2024 Little Ilford by-election
Party	Candidate	Votes	%	±%
Labour	Aktharul Alam	884		
Independent	Tahir Mirza	738		
Liberal Democrats	Akm Rahman	274		
Independent	Vijay Parthiban	163		
Conservative	Mohamadu Faheem	104		
Green	Joe Oteng	103		
Turnout				
Labour hold		Swing		

=== 2022 election ===
The election took place on 5 May 2022.

2022 Newham London Borough Council election: Little Ilford
Party	Candidate	Votes	%	±%
Labour	Syed Bashar	2,200	63.7	N/A
Labour	Nur Begum	2,159	62.5	N/A
Labour	Elizabeth Booker	2,089	60.5	N/A
Independent	Tahir Mirza	667	19.3	N/A
Liberal Democrats	Mahibur Akm	512	14.8	N/A
Conservative	Mufid Asm	512	14.8	N/A
Liberal Democrats	Mujeeb Rehman	384	11.1	N/A
Conservative	Bishwajit Bal	373	10.8	N/A
Conservative	Mary Antwi	356	10.3	N/A
Green	Amy Wilson	301	8.7	N/A
Green	Terrence Stamp	291	8.4	N/A
Green	Waleed Zuoriki	150	4.3	N/A
CPA	Deirdre Pask	130	3.8	N/A
CPA	Peter Murengera	123	3.6	N/A
CPA	James Pask	120	3.5	N/A
Turnout		3,796	32.9	N/A
Registered electors		11,539		
Labour win (new boundaries)				
Labour win (new boundaries)				
Labour win (new boundaries)				

== 2002–2022 Newham council elections ==
Little Ilford ward boundaries from 2002 to 2022

There was a revision of ward boundaries in Newham in 2002.

=== 2018 election ===
The election took place on 3 May 2018.

2018 Newham London Borough Council election: Little Ilford
Party	Candidate	Votes	%	±%
Labour	Nazir Ahmed	3,039	31.0	N/A
Labour	Riaz Mirza	2,904	29.0	N/A
Labour	Pushpa Makwana	2,843	29.0	N/A
Conservative	Zilor Mannan	409	4.0	N/A
Conservative	Ravindrareddy Nandivelugu	381	4.0	N/A
Conservative	Kashem Uddin	359	4.0	N/A
Turnout		3,810	36.9	−8.6
Registered electors		10,335		
Labour hold		Swing		
Labour hold		Swing		
Labour hold		Swing		

=== 2014 election ===
The election took place on 22 May 2014.

2014 Newham London Borough Council election: Little Ilford
Party	Candidate	Votes	%	±%
Labour	Farah Nazeer	2,997	25.0	N/A
Labour	Ken Clark	2,954	25.0	N/A
Labour	Andrew Baikie	2,889	24.0	N/A
Conservative	Attic Rahman	867	7.0	N/A
Conservative	Ajab Khan	833	7.0	N/A
Conservative	Fazal Urrahman	783	7.0	N/A
Liberal Democrats	Trevor Anthony Watson	237	2.0	N/A
CPA	Oluwayemisi Anthony	186	2.0	N/A
CPA	Bunmi Taiwo	148	1.0	N/A
CPA	Prossy Namwanje	105	1.0	N/A
Turnout		4,501	45.5	−3.2
Registered electors		9,882		
Labour hold		Swing		
Labour hold		Swing		
Labour hold		Swing		
