= Beckton (ward) =

- Electoral ward for the Newham London Borough Council
- Beckton ward boundaries since 2022
- Borough: Newham
- County: Greater London
- Population: 16,146 (2021) (Note: 2021 Census data reported for 2022 ward boundaries)
- Electorate: 10,513 (2022)
- Area: 5.618 square kilometres (2.169 sq mi)

Current electoral ward
- Created: 1965
- Number of members: 3
- Councillors: Blossom Young; Rohima Rahman; Tonii Wilson
- GSS code: E05013904 (2022–present)

Beckton is an electoral ward in the London Borough of Newham. The ward was first used in the 1964 elections. It returns councillors to Newham London Borough Council.

== Newham council elections since 2022 ==
There was a revision of ward boundaries in Newham in 2022.

=== 2024 by-election ===
The by-election took place on 18 July 2024, following the resignation of James Asser.

2024 Beckton by-election
Party	Candidate	Votes	%	±%
Labour	Blossom Young	597		
Independent	Shahzad Abbasi	476		
Green	Justine Levoir	228		
Conservative	Maria Clifford	144		
Liberal Democrats	James Alan-Rumsby	96		
Turnout				
Labour hold		Swing		

=== 2022 election ===
The election took place on 5 May 2022.

2022 Newham London Borough Council election: Beckton
Party	Candidate	Votes	%	±%
Labour	James Asser	1,386	52.9	N/A
Labour	Rohima Rahman	1,263	48.2	N/A
Labour	Tonii Wilson	1,103	42.1	N/A
Green	Alison McLucas	873	33.3	N/A
Green	Karen Webb-Green	826	31.6	N/A
Green	Sol Bourgeon	797	30.4	N/A
Conservative	Abedin Kazi	423	16.2	N/A
Conservative	Victor Aning	400	15.3	N/A
Conservative	Benedetto Litteri	363	13.9	N/A
CPA	Nancy Ameku	182	7.0	N/A
CPA	Phebe Newman	123	4.7	N/A
CPA	June Taylor	115	4.4	N/A
Turnout		2,943	27.8	N/A
Registered electors		10,513		
Labour win (new boundaries)				
Labour win (new boundaries)				
Labour win (new boundaries)				

== 2002–2022 Newham council elections ==
Beckton ward boundaries from 2002 to 2022

There was a revision of ward boundaries in Newham in 2002.

=== 2018 election ===
The election took place on 3 May 2018.

2018 Newham London Borough Council election: Beckton
Party	Candidate	Votes	%	±%
Labour	James Asser	1,722	23.0	N/A
Labour	Ayesha Chowdhury	1,717	23.0	+2.0
Labour	Tonii Wilson	1,445	19.0	N/A
Independent	Syed Ahmed	598	7.9	N/A
Conservative	Joshua Lindl	454	6.0	N/A
Green	Jane Lithgow	428	6.0	N/A
Conservative	Conny Nasmyth	359	5.0	N/A
Conservative	Emmanuel Obasi	296	4.0	−3.0
CPA	June Taylor	193	3.0	N/A
CPA	Alice Olaiya	144	2.0	N/A
CPA	Chike Dunkwu	142	2.0	±0.0
Turnout		2,968	29.0	−2.8
Registered electors		10,251		
Labour hold		Swing		
Labour hold		Swing		
Labour hold		Swing		
