= Plaistow North =

Electoral ward in the London Borough of Newham

- Electoral ward for the Newham London Borough Council
- Plaistow North ward boundaries since 2022
- Borough: Newham
- County: Greater London
- Population: 18,290 (2021) (Note: 2021 Census data reported for 2022 ward boundaries)
- Electorate: 10,791 (2022)
- Area: 1.027 square kilometres (0.397 sq mi)

Current electoral ward
- Created: 2002
- Number of members: 3
- Councillors: Zulfiqar Ali; Joy Laguda; Sophia Naqvi
- GSS code: E05013918

Plaistow North is an electoral ward in the London Borough of Newham. The ward was first used in the 2002 elections. It returns councillors to Newham London Borough Council.

== Newham council elections since 2022 ==
=== 2023 by-election ===
The by-election was held on 23 November 2023, following the resignation of Daniel Lee-Phakoe.

2023 Plaistow North by-election
Party	Candidate	Votes	%	±%
Independent	Sophia Naqvi	1,266	46.3	
Labour	Aktharul Alam	750	27.4	
Independent	Anasur Khan	274	10.0	
Conservative	James Clifford	257	9.4	
Green	Zahra Kheyre	113	4.1	
Liberal Democrats	David Terrar	73	2.7	
Majority		516	18.9	
Turnout		2,733	25.2	−3.2
Registered electors		10,905		
Independent gain from Labour		Swing		

=== 2022 election ===
The election took place on 5 May 2022.

2022 Newham London Borough Council election: Plaistow North
Party	Candidate	Votes	%	±%
Labour	Zulfiqar Ali	2,151	71.6	N/A
Labour	Joy Laguda	2,022	67.3	N/A
Labour	Daniel Lee-Phakoe	1,936	64.4	N/A
Green	Elsa Malki	560	18.6	N/A
Conservative	John Flesher	523	17.4	N/A
Conservative	Mufti Islam	522	17.4	N/A
Green	Francis Moore	518	17.2	N/A
Conservative	Saverimuthu Mariadas	390	13.0	N/A
Green	Aki Turan	390	13.0	N/A
Turnout		3,063	28.4	N/A
Registered electors		10,791		
Labour win (new boundaries)				
Labour win (new boundaries)				
Labour win (new boundaries)				
