= Plaistow South =

Electoral ward in the London Borough of Newham

- Electoral ward for the Newham London Borough Council
- Plaistow South ward boundaries since 2022
- Borough: Newham
- County: Greater London
- Population: 13,173 (2021) (Note: 2021 Census data reported for 2022 ward boundaries)
- Electorate: 8,564 (2022)
- Area: 1.144 square kilometres (0.442 sq mi)

Current electoral ward
- Created: 2002
- Number of members: 3
- Councillors: Carlene Lee-Phakoe; Jane Lofthouse; Nazrul Islam
- GSS code: E05013919

Plaistow South is an electoral ward in the London Borough of Newham. The ward was first used in the 2002 elections. It returns councillors to Newham London Borough Council.

== Newham council elections since 2022 ==
There was a revision of ward boundaries in Newham in 2022.

=== 2025 by-election ===
The by-election took place on 18 September 2025, following the death of Neil Wilson.

2025 Plaistow South by-election
Party	Candidate	Votes	%	±%
Independent	Nazrul Islam	913		
Labour	Ash Singh	436		
Reform	Lazar Monu	329		
Green	Nicholas Motte	152		
Conservative	Rois Miah	123		
Liberal Democrats	Sheree Miller	90		
Turnout			23.1	
Independent gain from Labour		Swing		

=== 2022 election ===
The election took place on 5 May 2022.

2022 Newham London Borough Council election: Plaistow South
Party	Candidate	Votes	%	±%
Labour	Neil Wilson	1,360	64.2	N/A
Labour	Jane Lofthouse	1,292	61.0	N/A
Labour	Carlene Lee-Phakoe	1,284	60.6	N/A
Conservative	Murad Chowdhury	430	20.3	N/A
Green	Nicholas Dowden	390	18.4	N/A
Conservative	Roy Miah	345	16.3	N/A
Green	Iain McKeil	334	15.8	N/A
Green	Anca-Elena Zaman	328	15.5	N/A
Conservative	Dhiman Das	311	14.7	N/A
Liberal Democrats	Sheree Miller	279	13.2	N/A
Turnout		2,430	28.3	N/A
Registered electors		8,564		
Labour win (new boundaries)				
Labour win (new boundaries)				
Labour win (new boundaries)				
