= Communities United Party =

Defunct political party in London

- Leader: Kamran Malik
- Founded: 2010

Website
- www.communitiesunitedparty.com

The Communities United Party is a minor party based in East London in the United Kingdom.

The party was founded by Kamran Malik, born in East London. He ran as an independent in West Ham at the 2010 general election, taking fifth place with 2.7% of the votes cast. He founded the party the same year, and ran in the contest to become Mayor of Newham, managing third place and saving his deposit with 7% of the vote. He then stood in City and East in the 2012 London Assembly election, taking sixth place and 4%.

From 2011, the party brought nine cases against Newham Borough Council in the courts over a variety of issues, the last being a claim that the council had made an inept loan to the London Pleasure Gardens project. However, they lost each case and in 2013 were banned from bringing any further cases under a civil restraint order.

The party again put Malik forward as its candidate for Mayor of Newham in 2014; he took fifth place with 3.6% of the vote. They also stood in London at the 2014 European Parliament election, campaigning for council tax and business rates reform, and universal university education. The party's leaflets attracted attention for featuring a large image of a bald eagle. The following month, Malik was jailed for six months after being convicted of illegally offering immigration advice and services.

The party stood five candidates in the 2015 general election, which were all in London.

In June 2018 Kamran Malik was jailed for a second time after pleading guilty to four counts of providing unqualified immigration advice and services.

The party stood two candidates in the East Ham and West Ham constituencies at the 2019 general election.
