= Alan Craig =

British political campaigner

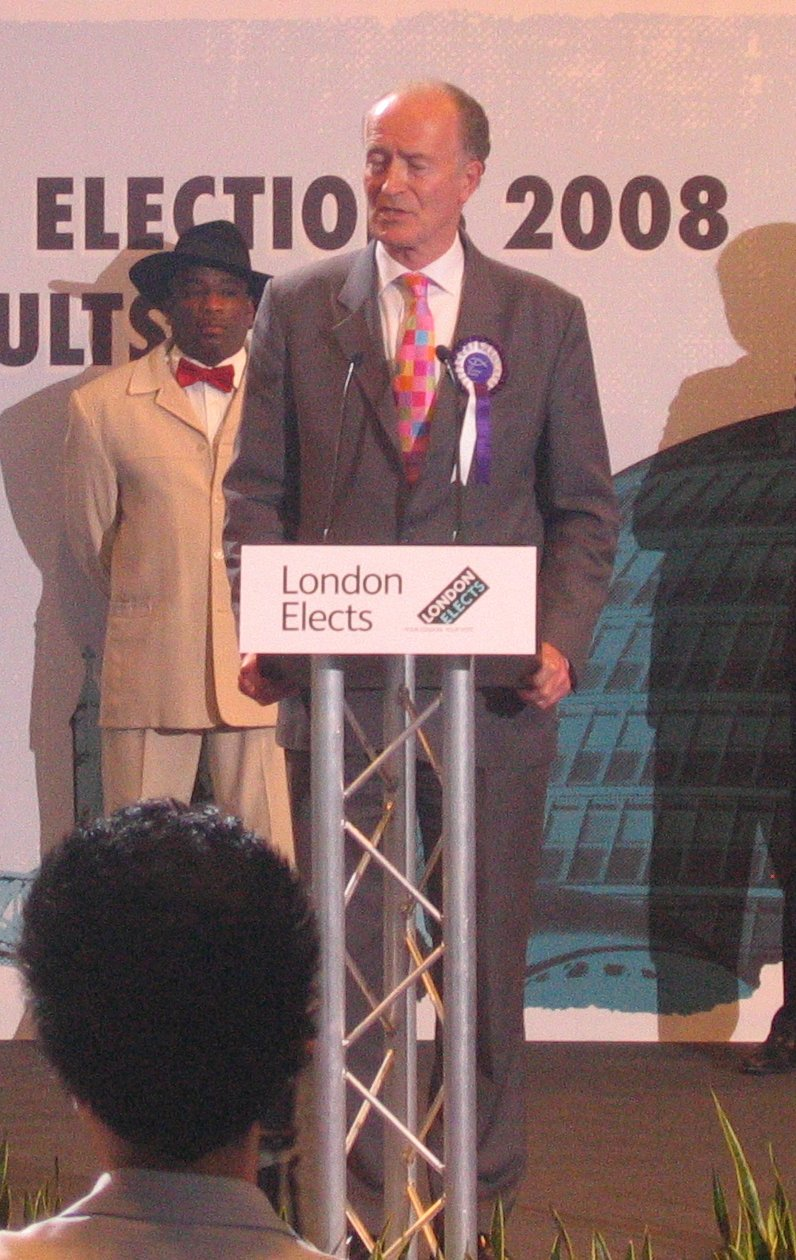

Leader of the Christian Peoples Alliance
- In office 2004–2012
- Preceded by: Ram Gidoomal
- Succeeded by: Sidney Cordle

Leader of the Opposition on Newham Borough Council
- In office 2 May 2002 – 6 May 2010

Member of Newham Borough Council for Canning Town South
- In office 2 May 2002 – 6 May 2010

Personal details
- Born: 1945 or 1946 (age 80–81)
- Party: Christian Peoples Alliance (2002–2013); UK Independence Party (2014–2019)
- Website: http://www.alansangle.com/

Alexander Alan Craig is a British politician and community worker who previously served as leader of the Christian Peoples Alliance (CPA) from 2004 to 2012. He stood as a candidate for Mayor of London in 2008 and was a councillor in Newham for eight years. He defected to the UK Independence Party (UKIP) in 2014, where he served as UKIP's spokesperson for families and children from 2018 to around 2019.

== Life ==
Craig was born in 1945 or 1946. He studied for a Master of Business Administration. He became an evangelical Christian in his mid-thirties.

== Political career ==
=== Christian Peoples Alliance ===
Craig first stood for Newham Council in 1998 as an independent candidate in Ordnance ward, and in 2001 he stood in a by-election for Beckton ward for the Christian Peoples Alliance.

He was elected to Newham Council for Canning Town South in the 2002 local elections, becoming the only non-Labour councillor. On the same day, he unsuccessfully ran to be mayor of Newham, coming fourth. In the 2006 elections he was re-elected as a councillor as part of a group of three Christian Peoples Alliance councillors, and unsuccessfully ran to be mayor of Newham, coming fourth again. As a councillor, Craig opposed the building of the London Markaz Mosque; he said that while he supports the right to worship, he had fears over the impact upon the community and on security. He also opposed the opening of one of the regional casinos in Newham, campaigned to end the DESO-funded arms fair and played a leading role in the campaign to save the Queens Road Market. He lost his council seat in 2010, when he unsuccessfully ran to be mayor of Newham a third time.

He became leader of the Christian Peoples Alliance in 2004 and led the party in the 2005 general election and the 2010 general election, in which the party won no seats.

In 2011 he was criticised for comparing gay rights activists to Nazis in the Church of England Newspaper. In 2013 Craig became the spokesperson for a campaign group against same-sex marriage called "Gay Marriage No Thanks", and compared same-sex marriage to child abuse.

=== UK Independence Party ===
In October 2014, Craig joined the UK Independence Party (UKIP). In the 2015 general election, he was the UKIP candidate for Brent North where he lost his deposit, coming fourth with 3.9% of the vote.

He was due to speak at an event advocating conversion therapy organised by the Core Issues Trust in April 2015. The conference organisers later asked him not to speak to avoid associating the event with a political party.

He was selected to be UKIP's candidate for the South West constituency in the 2016 London Assembly election. The runner up in the selection, LGBT activist and former parliamentary candidate Richard Hendron, resigned from the party over Craig's selection. UKIP's deputy chair, Suzanne Evans opposed his selection. The party's leader, Nigel Farage, removed her from her position and she was suspended for six months. Craig came fifth in the election for the South West constituency, with 7% of the vote. In 2016, he wrote that he wanted to see "the gay marriage debate reopened".

In the 2017 general election, he was the UKIP candidate for Witney. He finished last and lost his deposit, receiving 1.6% of the vote. After the election, he was campaign manager for David Kurten's 2017 leadership campaign to be leader of UKIP.

In March 2018 Craig was appointed UKIP's first Spokesperson for Families & Children, leading to resignations from the leadership of the party's LGBT group. He proposed that far-right activist Tommy Robinson should be allowed to join the party. He was criticised by groups including Quilliam for claiming that Muslim grooming gangs were orchestrating a "Holocaust of our children". At UKIP's 2018 conference, he described LGBT-inclusive education as child abuse.

Craig stood for UKIP in the Canning Town North ward in the 2018 local elections in Newham and was the last-placed candidate on UKIP's list for the North West England constituency in the 2019 European Parliament election.
