= 2018 Newham London Borough Council election =

2018 local election in England

2018 Newham Council election
- 3 May 2018

All 60 council seats 30 seats needed for a majority
	First party
Party	Labour
Last election	60 seats, 59.7%
Seats won	60
Seat change	Steady
Popular vote	51,294
Percentage	67.2
Swing	▲7.5%
- Map of the results of the 2018 Newham council election. Labour in red.
Largest Party before election
Labour
Largest Party
Labour

The 2018 Newham London Borough Council election was held on 3 May 2018 to elect members of Newham London Borough Council in England. This was on the same day as other local elections.

Elections were held for the Mayor of Newham and for all 60 seats on the council. The Labour Party candidate Rokhsana Fiaz won the mayoral election. Labour candidates won all 60 seats on the council, as they did in 2014 and 2010.

== Summary results ==
The Labour Party won 67% of the vote and all 60 seats for the third election in a row.

Newham local election result 2018
Party	Seats	Gains	Losses	Net gain/loss	Seats %	Votes %	Votes	+/−
Labour	60	0	0	±0.0	100.0	67.2	51,294	+7.5
Conservative	0	0	0	±0.0	0.0	15.2	11,627	-7.8
Liberal Democrats	0	0	0	±0.0	0.0	5.9	4,523	+2.4
Green	0	0	0	±0.0	0.0	5.2	3,940	+4.5
CPA	0	0	0	±0.0	0.0	3.7	2,828	-2.0
Independent	0	0	0	±0.0	0.0	1.3	958	+0.8
TUSC	0	0	0	±0.0	0.0	0.8	634	-1.6
UKIP	0	0	0	±0.0	0.0	0.3	263	-3.9
Democrats and Veterans	0	0	0	±0.0	0.0	0.2	190	N/A
Communist League	0	0	0	±0.0	0.0	0.1	52	N/A

== Background ==
A total of 181 candidates stood in the election for the 60 seats being contested across 20 wards. Candidates included a full slate from the Labour Party (as had been the case at every election since the borough council had been formed in 1964), whilst the Conservative Party also ran a full slate for the second election in a row, and the Liberal Democrats ran 14 candidates. Other candidates running were 25 Christian Peoples Alliance, 11 Greens, 4 TUSC, 2 UKIP, 2 Democrats and Veterans, 1 Communist League and 2 Independents.

== Ward results ==
An asterisk * indicates an incumbent Councillor seeking re-election.

=== Beckton ===
Beckton (3)
Party	Candidate	Votes	%	±%
Labour	James Asser	1,722	23.0	N/A
Labour	Ayesha Chowdhury*	1,717	23.0	+2.0
Labour	Tonii Wilson*	1,445	19.0	N/A
Independent	Syed Ahmed	598	7.9	N/A
Conservative	Joshua Lindl	454	6.0	N/A
Green	Jane Lithgow	428	6.0	N/A
Conservative	Conny Nasmyth	359	5.0	N/A
Conservative	Emmanuel Obasi	296	4.0	−3.0
CPA	June Taylor	193	3.0	N/A
CPA	Alice Olaiya	144	2.0	N/A
CPA	Chike Dunkwu	142	2.0	±0.0
Turnout		2,968	29.0	−2.8
Registered electors		10,251		
Labour hold		Swing		
Labour hold		Swing		
Labour hold		Swing		

=== Boleyn ===
Boleyn (3)
Party	Candidate	Votes	%	±%
Labour	Gen Kitchen	2,824	29.0	N/A
Labour	Veronica Oakeshott*	2,544	27.0	N/A
Labour	Harvinder Virdee*	2,280	24.0	+2.0
Conservative	Fazlul Karim	693	7.0	N/A
Conservative	Sayadur Rahman	450	5.0	N/A
Green	Helen Lynch	405	4.0	N/A
Conservative	Khatija Meaby	384	4.0	N/A
Turnout		3,852	38.9	−5.1
Registered electors		9,900		
Labour hold		Swing		
Labour hold		Swing		
Labour hold		Swing		

=== Canning Town North ===
Canning Town North (3)
Party	Candidate	Votes	%	±%
Labour	Canon Easter*	2,586	29.0	+6.0
Labour	Shaban Mohammed	2,282	25.0	N/A
Labour	Delphine Tohoura	2,010	22.0	N/A
Conservative	Ahmed Faqai	406	4.0	N/A
Conservative	Maxwell Marah	395	4.0	±0.0
Conservative	Rachel Nabudde	341	4.0	N/A
CPA	Chishala Kumalinga	319	4.0	N/A
UKIP	Alan Craig	263	3.0	N/A
UKIP	Stuart Goodwin	249	3.0	N/A
CPA	Bapu Rani	204	2.0	N/A
Turnout		3,408	31.6	−4.3
Registered electors		10,777		
Labour hold		Swing		
Labour hold		Swing		
Labour hold		Swing		

=== Canning Town South ===
Canning Town South (3)
Party	Candidate	Votes	%	±%
Labour	Alan Griffiths*	1,991	23.0	+4.0
Labour	Rohit Dasgupta	1,965	22.0	N/A
Labour	Belgica Guana	1,693	19.0	N/A
Conservative	Marc Pooler	643	7.0	N/A
Conservative	Mark Seymour	559	6.0	N/A
Liberal Democrats	Caroline Carey	552	6.0	N/A
Green	Danny Keeling	464	5.0	N/A
Conservative	Mahyar Tousi	378	4.0	N/A
CPA	Myrtle Laing	222	3.0	N/A
CPA	Sharmila Swarna	145	2.0	N/A
CPA	Prossy Namwanje	144	2.0	N/A
Turnout		3,319	28.2	−4.8
Registered electors		11,749		
Labour hold		Swing		
Labour hold		Swing		
Labour hold		Swing		

=== Custom House ===
Custom House (3)
Party	Candidate	Votes	%	±%
Labour	Patricia Holland*	1,775	26.0	+1.0
Labour	James Beckles*	1,655	24.0	N/A
Labour	Sarah Ruiz	1,458	22.0	N/A
Conservative	Nicole Garrett	414	6.0	N/A
Conservative	Tim Roll-Pickering	312	5.0	N/A
Conservative	Akram Mwanga	302	4.0	N/A
Democrats and Veterans	Daniel Oxley	190	3.0	N/A
Democrats and Veterans	Kay McKenzie	182	3.0	N/A
CPA	Cynthia Owusu-Addai	173	3.0	N/A
CPA	Paul Banjoko	169	2.0	N/A
CPA	Lanre Shedowo	149	2.0	N/A
Turnout		2,618	28.8	−3.4
Registered electors		9,082		
Labour hold		Swing		
Labour hold		Swing		
Labour hold		Swing		

=== East Ham Central ===
East Ham Central (3)
Party	Candidate	Votes	%	±%
Labour	Julianne Marriott*	2,939	29.0	+8.0
Labour	Aisha Siddiqah	2,819	27.0	N/A
Labour	Suga Thekkeppurayil	2,568	25.0	N/A
Conservative	Rafeh Ahmed	507	5.0	N/A
Conservative	Bishwajit Bal	475	5.0	N/A
Conservative	Sabir Banglawala	427	4.0	N/A
CPA	Dominic Anthony	326	3.0	+1.0
CPA	Roja Chika	192	2.0	+1.0
Turnout		3,967	39.6	−2.9
Registered electors		10,018		
Labour hold		Swing		
Labour hold		Swing		
Labour hold		Swing		

=== East Ham North ===
East Ham North (3)
Party	Candidate	Votes	%	±%
Labour	Zuber Gulamussen*	2,726	25.0	+5.0
Labour	Daniel Blaney	2,627	24.0	N/A
Labour	Firoza Nekiwala*	2,614	24.0	+3.0
Conservative	Ilyas Sharif	994	9.0	−3.0
Conservative	Mohammed Azharuddin	992	9.0	N/A
Conservative	Durai Kannan	763	7.0	−3.0
Liberal Democrats	Naveed Akbar	230	2.0	N/A
Turnout		4,213	45.2	−6.8
Registered electors		9,322		
Labour hold		Swing		
Labour hold		Swing		
Labour hold		Swing		

=== East Ham South ===
East Ham South (3)
Party	Candidate	Votes	%	±%
Labour	Susan Masters*	2,784	30.0	+7.0
Labour	Quintin Peppiatt*	2,471	27.0	+5.0
Labour	Lakmini Shah*	2,286	25.0	+4.0
Conservative	Mostafizur Rahman	508	5.0	N/A
Conservative	Syed Kabir	496	5.0	N/A
Conservative	Aiden Langley	466	5.0	N/A
TUSC	Mary Finch	255	3.0	N/A
Turnout		3,806	38.2	−4.3
Registered electors		9,976		
Labour hold		Swing		
Labour hold		Swing		
Labour hold		Swing		

=== Forest Gate North ===
Forest Gate North (3)
Party	Candidate	Votes	%	±%
Labour	Rachel Tripp*	2,425	24.0	N/A
Labour	Sasha Dasgupta	2,346	23.0	N/A
Labour	Anamul Islam*	2,070	20.0	N/A
Green	Nate Higgins	743	7.0	N/A
Green	Frankie-Rose Taylor	729	7.0	N/A
Green	Michael Spracklin	606	6.0	N/A
Liberal Democrats	Christian Moon	399	4.0	+2.0
Conservative	Abdul Chowdhury	327	3.0	N/A
Conservative	Brian Maze	314	3.0	−2.0
Conservative	Ariful Islam	281	3.0	N/A
Turnout		3,835	37.8	−0.9
Registered electors		10,140		
Labour hold		Swing		
Labour hold		Swing		
Labour hold		Swing		

=== Forest Gate South ===
Forest Gate South (3)
Party	Candidate	Votes	%	±%
Labour	Masihullah Patel	2,540	24.0	+2.0
Labour	Tahmina Rahman	2,510	24.0	N/A
Labour	Winston Vaughan*	2,485	24.0	+4.0
Green	Hugh Barnard	600	6.0	N/A
Conservative	Matthew Edwards	416	4.0	N/A
Liberal Democrats	Michael Fox	387	4.0	N/A
Conservative	Shaeb Khan	371	4.0	N/A
Conservative	Olenka Gradosielska	357	3.0	N/A
Liberal Democrats	Madeleine Haysey	344	3.0	N/A
Liberal Democrats	James Jones	284	3.0	N/A
TUSC	Lois Austen	158	2.0	N/A
Turnout		3,889	35.4	−3.7
Registered electors		10,973		
Labour hold		Swing		
Labour hold		Swing		
Labour hold		Swing		

=== Green Street East ===
Green Street East (3)
Party	Candidate	Votes	%	±%
Labour	Muhammad Ali	2,973	28.0	N/A
Labour	Mohammed Rahman	2,941	28.0	N/A
Labour	Nilufa Jahan	2,915	28.0	N/A
Conservative	Kirankumar Patel	630	6.0	N/A
Conservative	Matthew Kinghorn	593	6.0	N/A
Conservative	Mohammad Rahman	469	4.0	N/A
Turnout		4,053	42.6	−6.2
Registered electors		9,507		
Labour hold		Swing		
Labour hold		Swing		
Labour hold		Swing		

=== Green Street West ===
Green Street West (3)
Party	Candidate	Votes	%	±%
Labour	Hanif Abdulmuhit*	2,991	29.0	+6.0
Labour	Mushtaq Hussain	2,715	26.0	N/A
Labour	Mumtaz Khan	2,591	25.0	N/A
Conservative	Abdul Sheikh	709	7.0	−2.0
Conservative	Muhammad Chishti	696	7.0	N/A
Conservative	Kamran Yousaf	611	6.0	N/A
Turnout		3,913	41.2	−7.9
Registered electors		9,503		
Labour hold		Swing		
Labour hold		Swing		
Labour hold		Swing		

=== Little Ilford ===
Little Ilford (3)
Party	Candidate	Votes	%	±%
Labour	Nazir Ahmed	3,039	31.0	N/A
Labour	Riaz Mirza	2,904	29.0	N/A
Labour	Pushpa Makwana	2,843	29.0	N/A
Conservative	Zilor Mannan	409	4.0	N/A
Conservative	Ravindrareddy Nandivelugu	381	4.0	N/A
Conservative	Kashem Uddin	359	4.0	N/A
Turnout		3,810	36.9	−8.6
Registered electors		10,335		
Labour hold		Swing		
Labour hold		Swing		
Labour hold		Swing		

=== Manor Park ===
Manor Park (3)
Party	Candidate	Votes	%	±%
Labour	Mariam Dawood	3,112	29.0	N/A
Labour	Ken Clark*	3,081	29.0	N/A
Labour	Salim Patel*	2,810	26.0	+1.0
Green	Derek Jackson	401	4.0	N/A
Liberal Democrats	Michael German	338	3.0	N/A
Conservative	Afzal Hossain	333	3.0	N/A
Conservative	Nasima Khatun	318	3.0	N/A
Conservative	Ibrahim Amanji	311	3.0	N/A
Turnout		3,903	40.3	−1.6
Registered electors		9,680		
Labour hold		Swing		
Labour hold		Swing		
Labour hold		Swing		

=== Plaistow North ===
Plaistow North (3)
Party	Candidate	Votes	%	±%
Labour	Zulfiqar Ali	2,737	29.0	N/A
Labour	Joy Laguda*	2,369	25.0	+4.0
Labour	Daniel Lee-Phakoe	2,288	24.0	N/A
Conservative	Fokoruddin Ahmed	454	5.0	N/A
Liberal Democrats	Alexander Fisher	407	4.0	N/A
Conservative	Walye Jahedi	368	4.0	−4.0
Conservative	Aimee Alado	352	4.0	N/A
CPA	Paul Jobson	295	3.0	+1.0
CPA	Winky Newman	202	2.0	N/A
Turnout		3,634	37.9	−3.2
Registered electors		9,585		
Labour hold		Swing		
Labour hold		Swing		
Labour hold		Swing		

=== Plaistow South ===
Plaistow South (3)
Party	Candidate	Votes	%	±%
Labour	Carleene Lee-Phakoe	2,544	25.0	N/A
Labour	Jane Lofthouse	2,476	24.0	N/A
Labour	Neil Wilson*	2,269	22.0	+1.0
Conservative	Nazrul Islam	573	6.0	N/A
Conservative	Farhana Firdous	517	5.0	N/A
Conservative	Rois Miah	501	5.0	−2.0
Liberal Democrats	James Raymond	412	4.0	N/A
Green	Edward Lynch	392	4.0	N/A
CPA	Flora Amar	194	2.0	N/A
CPA	Earna Gibson	180	2.0	N/A
Communist League	Hugh Robertson	52	1.0	N/A
Turnout		3,734	35.8	−11.6
Registered electors		10,440		
Labour hold		Swing		
Labour hold		Swing		
Labour hold		Swing		

=== Royal Docks ===
Royal Docks (3)
Party	Candidate	Votes	%	±%
Labour	Stephen Brayshaw*	1,421	23.0	±0.0
Labour	Patrick Murphy*	1,315	21.0	±0.0
Labour	Tony McAlmont*	1,292	21.0	±0.0
Conservative	Mary Antwi	504	8.0	N/A
Conservative	Charles Meaby	452	7.0	N/A
Conservative	Attic Rahman	372	6.0	N/A
Independent	Keith Murray	360	6.0	N/A
Liberal Democrats	Tahir Saiyed	320	5.0	N/A
CPA	Ethel Odiete	156	2.0	N/A
TUSC	James Ivens	94	1.0	N/A
Turnout		2,466	29.0	−4.6
Registered electors		8,512		
Labour hold		Swing		
Labour hold		Swing		
Labour hold		Swing		

=== Stratford and New Town ===
Stratford and New Town (3)
Party	Candidate	Votes	%	±%
Labour	Joshua Garfield	3,288	22.0	N/A
Labour	Nareser Osei	2,970	20.0	N/A
Labour	Terence Paul*	2,825	19.0	−5.0
Liberal Democrats	Gareth Evans	1,195	8.0	N/A
Green	Rachel Nunson	1,017	7.0	N/A
Liberal Democrats	Sheree Miller	848	6.0	N/A
Liberal Democrats	James Rumsby	790	5.0	N/A
Conservative	Andrius Kavaliauskas	642	4.0	N/A
Conservative	John Oxley	635	4.0	N/A
Conservative	Shardi Shameli	529	4.0	N/A
CPA	John Falana	172	1.0	−1.0
CPA	Esther Smith	136	1.0	N/A
Turnout		5,411	29.6	−4.0
Registered electors		18,252		
Labour hold		Swing		
Labour hold		Swing		
Labour hold		Swing		

=== Wall End ===
Wall End (3)
Party	Candidate	Votes	%	±%
Labour	Jennifer Bailey	2,911	27.0	N/A
Labour	Omanakutty Gangadharan	2,885	27.0	N/A
Labour	Lester Hudson*	2,633	24.0	+5.0
Conservative	Mufti Islam	701	6.0	N/A
Conservative	Masbah Khan	693	6.0	N/A
Conservative	Mohammed Ali	627	6.0	N/A
CPA	Amalraj Kakumanu	169	2.0	+1.0
TUSC	Hannah Sell	127	1.0	N/A
CPA	Shashir Kakumanu	118	1.0	±0.0
Turnout		4,164	43.2	−5.9
Registered electors		9,640		
Labour hold		Swing		
Labour hold		Swing		
Labour hold		Swing		

=== West Ham ===
West Ham (3)
Party	Candidate	Votes	%	±%
Labour	John Gray*	2,284	25.0	+3.0
Labour	Charlene McLean*	2,188	24.0	N/A
Labour	John Whitworth*	2,112	24.0	+2.0
Conservative	Thomas Barbert	430	5.0	N/A
Green	Kenneth Lyle	396	4.0	N/A
Conservative	Abul Abdullah	393	4.0	N/A
Liberal Democrats	Alexander Tuppen	341	4.0	N/A
Conservative	Natalie Pendrous	334	4.0	N/A
CPA	Sheila Brown	203	2.0	−1.0
CPA	Barbara Chukwurah	153	2.0	N/A
CPA	Dieutane Parson	142	2.0	N/A
Turnout		3,322	33.8	−12.0
Registered electors		9,819		
Labour hold		Swing		
Labour hold		Swing		
Labour hold		Swing		

== By-elections between 2018 and 2022 ==
=== Boleyn ===
Boleyn by-election, 1 November 2018
Party	Candidate	Votes	%	±%
Labour	Moniba Khan	1,725	74.8	N/A
Conservative	Fazlul Karim	327	14.2	N/A
Green	Frankie Rose-Taylor	172	7.5	N/A
Liberal Democrats	Arun Pirapaharan	83	3.6	N/A
Majority		1,398	60.6	N/A
Turnout			23.5	−15.4
Registered electors				
Labour hold		Swing		

The by-election was called following the resignation of Cllr Veronica Oakeshott.

=== East Ham ===
East Ham Central by-election, 6 May 2021
Party	Candidate	Votes	%	±%
Labour Co-op	Farah Nazeer	2,297	54.4	N/A
Conservative	Sk Zakir Hossain	1,288	30.5	N/A
Green	Danny Keeling	283	6.7	N/A
Liberal Democrats	Ed Comaromi	239	5.7	N/A
CPA	Paul Jobson	115	2.7	N/A
TUSC	Lois Austin	91	2.1	N/A
Majority		1,009	23.9	N/A
Turnout		4,313		
Registered electors				
Labour Co-op hold		Swing		

The by-election was called following the resignation of Cllr Julianne Marriott.
