= 2010 Newham London Borough Council election =

2010 local election in England

- 6 May 2010

All 60 council seats to Newham London Borough Council 31 seats needed for a majority
	First party
Party	Labour
Last election	54 seats, 41.4%
Seats won	60
Seat change	▲6
Popular vote	63,292
Percentage	60.8
Swing	▲19.4%
- Map of the results of the 2010 Newham council election. Labour in red.
Council control before election
Labour
Council control after election
Labour

Elections to Newham London Borough Council in London, England was held on 6 May 2010. This was on the same day as other local elections and the general election to the UK Parliament.

The whole council, including the directly elected mayor, was up for election for the first time since the 2006 election. The Labour Party won all 60 seats on the borough council, with support for the Respect Party, who had come second in 2006, collapsing from 23% to 3%. Both Respect and the Christian Peoples Alliance lost all of their seats.

== Results ==
Newham local election result 2010
Party	Seats	Gains	Losses	Net gain/loss	Seats %	Votes %	Votes	+/−
Labour	60	6	0	+6	100.0	60.8	63,292	+19.4
Conservative	0	0	0	±0.0	0.0	18.6	19,323	+4.3
CPA	0	0	3	-3	0.0	8.1	8,428	-2.6
Liberal Democrats	0	0	0	±0.0	0.0	4.4	4,605	+1.5
Respect	0	0	3	-3	0.0	3.3	3,448	-19.9
Independent	0	0	0	±0.0	0.0	2.0	2,090	+0.5
Communities United	0	0	0	±0.0	0.0	1.2	1,255	N/A
Green	0	0	0	±0.0	0.0	0.9	905	-4.8
British Public Party	0	0	0	±0.0	0.0	0.4	409	+0.2
UKIP	0	0	0	±0.0	0.0	0.3	388	N/A

== Background ==
A total of 221 candidates stood in the election for the 60 seats being contested across 20 wards. Candidates included a full slate from the Labour Party (as had been the case at every election since the borough council had been formed in 1964), whilst the Conservative Party ran 59 candidates and the Liberal Democrats ran 11 candidates. Other candidates running were 59 Christian Peoples Alliance, 12 Respect, 10 Communities United Party, 1 Green, 1 UKIP, 1 British Public Party and 7 Independents.

== Ward results ==
=== Beckton ===
Beckton (3)
Party	Candidate	Votes	%	±%
Labour	Ayesha Chowdhury	2,361	47.9	+2.8
Labour	Alec Kellaway	2,258		N/A
Labour	David Christie	2,253		N/A
Conservative	Maria Allen	1,170	23.8	±0.0
Conservative	Syed Ahmed	1,154		N/A
Liberal Democrats	Mohammed Ahmed	1,030	20.9	N/A
Conservative	Karim Chowdhury	815		N/A
Liberal Democrats	Placid Bagalwa	529		N/A
CPA	Anne-Marie Philip	363	7.4	−6.6
CPA	David Cant	332		N/A
CPA	Malcolm Williamson	232		N/A
Turnout		4,641	40.6	+14.0
Registered electors		10,291		
Labour hold		Swing		
Labour hold		Swing		
Labour hold		Swing		

=== Boleyn ===
Boleyn (3)
Party	Candidate	Votes	%	±%
Labour	Riad Mirza	3,261	63.7	+19.5
Labour	Jo Corbett	3,221		N/A
Labour	Pearson Shillingford	3,107		N/A
Conservative	Moshiur Molla	1,354	26.5	+12.2
Conservative	Nazir Hamid	1,177		N/A
Conservative	Banti Singh	844		N/A
CPA	Andrew Cook	386	7.5	−0.9
CPA	Shirley Williamson	314		N/A
CPA	Angel Caroo	275		N/A
Communities United	Siva Bodduluri	116	2.3	N/A
Communities United	Princy Thoomullifrancis	81		N/A
Turnout		5,451	48.7	+10.9
Registered electors		9,731		
Labour hold		Swing		
Labour hold		Swing		
Labour hold		Swing		

=== Canning Town North ===
Canning Town North (3)
Party	Candidate	Votes	%	±%
Labour	Marie Collier	2,696	58.2	+3.8
Labour	Clive Furness	2,440		N/A
Labour	Paul Schafer	2,229		N/A
Conservative	Nick Reeves	747	16.1	+2.0
Conservative	Barbara Normile	681		N/A
Conservative	Rachel Nabudde	672		N/A
CPA	Keith Adams	620	13.4	−6.4
CPA	Reginald Gardener	602		N/A
Independent	Wahid Ali	566	12.2	N/A
CPA	Barbara King	545		N/A
Turnout		4,609	40.2	+12.7
Registered electors		9,147		
Labour hold		Swing		
Labour hold		Swing		
Labour hold		Swing		

=== Canning Town South ===
Canning Town South (3)
Party	Candidate	Votes	%	±%
Labour	Bryan Collier	2,263	50.1	+19.4
Labour	Alan Taylor	2,074		N/A
Labour	Michael Nicholas	2,028		N/A
CPA	Alan Craig	1,399	31.0	−19.9
CPA	Denise Stafford	1,004		N/A
CPA	Hamilton Amachree	892		N/A
Conservative	Christopher Buckwell	858	19.0	+8.0
Conservative	Gareth Knight	794		N/A
Conservative	Abul Abdullah	721		N/A
Turnout		4,444	43.8	+11.0
Registered electors		9,187		
Labour gain from CPA		Swing		
Labour gain from CPA		Swing		
Labour gain from CPA		Swing		

=== Custom House ===
Custom House (3)
Party	Candidate	Votes	%	±%
Labour	Patricia Holland	2,375	53.1	+4.4
Labour	Conor McAuley	1,936		N/A
Labour	Gavin Pearson	1,867		N/A
Conservative	Jamie McKenzie	768	17.2	+4.8
CPA	Gilliam Roberts	712		N/A
CPA	Scott Gamble	632		N/A
Liberal Democrats	Linda Whichelow	617	13.8	N/A
Conservative	Emily Bijl	524		N/A
Conservative	Anup Banik	510		N/A
CPA	Kayode Shedowo	501		N/A
Turnout		4,105	41.3	+12.5
Registered electors		8,451		
Labour hold		Swing		
Labour hold		Swing		
Labour hold		Swing		

=== East Ham Central ===
East Ham Central (3)
Party	Candidate	Votes	%	±%
Labour	Ian Corbett	3,685	63.8	+15.3
Labour	Unmesh Desai	3,641		N/A
Labour	Mary Skyers	3,562		N/A
Conservative	Ali Anwar	1,371	23.7	+9.5
Conservative	Chaudry Hussain	1,289		N/A
Conservative	Biju Gopnath	1,137		N/A
British Public Party	Kashif Rana	409	7.1	N/A
CPA	Stephen Williamson	309	5.4	−2.9
CPA	Harold Bhatty	274		N/A
CPA	Christopher Oching	225		N/A
Turnout		5,706	51.5	+13.2
Registered electors		10,327		
Labour hold		Swing		
Labour hold		Swing		
Labour hold		Swing		

=== East Ham North ===
East Ham North (3)
Party	Candidate	Votes	%	±%
Labour	Firoza Nekiwala	3,825	65.3	+20.8
Labour	Jose Alexander	3,605		N/A
Labour	Paul Sathianesan	3,453		N/A
Liberal Democrats	Abdul Alim	970	16.6	N/A
Conservative	Duraimurugan Kannan	911	15.6	−0.1
Liberal Democrats	Sakthivel Karruptah	778		N/A
Conservative	Minhaj Writer	733		N/A
Conservative	Vasantha Mahadevan	717		N/A
Liberal Democrats	Trevor Watson	626		N/A
CPA	Jackie Boyce	149	2.5	−0.6
CPA	John Simmonds	120		N/A
CPA	Akinkunmi Akintunde	108		N/A
Turnout		5,921	52.3	+7.1
Registered electors		10,237		
Labour hold		Swing		
Labour hold		Swing		
Labour hold		Swing		

=== East Ham South ===
East Ham South (3)
Party	Candidate	Votes	%	±%
Labour	Kevin Jenkins	3,827	71.0	+31.2
Labour	Quintin Peppiatt	3,446		N/A
Labour	Lakmini Shah	3,358		N/A
Conservative	Alastair Grant	1,026	19.0	+4.1
Conservative	Darlington Dike	987		N/A
CPA	Joanne Garden	537	10.0	+2.3
CPA	Oluwasola Dada	401		N/A
CPA	David Mwanlki	339		N/A
Turnout		5,323	48.3	+14.4
Registered electors		9,644		
Labour hold		Swing		
Labour hold		Swing		
Labour hold		Swing		

=== Forest Gate North ===
Forest Gate North (3)
Party	Candidate	Votes	%	±%
Labour	Paul Brickell	3,652	60.2	+17.9
Labour	Ellie Robinson	3,631		N/A
Labour	Shama Ahmad	3,335		N/A
Green	Jane Lithgow	905	14.9	−0.3
Conservative	Brian Maze	836	13.8	+0.8
Conservative	Charles Meaby	730		N/A
Conservative	Ulla Mahaka	710		N/A
CPA	Sydney Burnett	411	6.8	−3.5
CPA	Tom Conquest	347		N/A
Independent	Manpreet Singh	267	4.4	N/A
Turnout		5,509	49.3	+14.0
Registered electors		10,053		
Labour hold		Swing		
Labour hold		Swing		
Labour hold		Swing		

=== Forest Gate South ===
Forest Gate South (3)
Party	Candidate	Votes	%	±%
Labour	Leonora Cameron	3,598	69.4	+33.2
Labour	Akbar Chaudhary	3,486		N/A
Labour	Winston Vaughan	3,311		N/A
Conservative	Barry Roberts	806	15.5	+4.5
Conservative	Alexandra Gradoslelska	708		N/A
Conservative	Khatija Meahy	697		N/A
Communities United	Shazeb Iqbal	409	7.9	N/A
CPA	Lynn Donaldson	371	7.2	−0.7
CPA	Reginald Eade	303		N/A
CPA	Andrew Williamson	286		N/A
Communities United	Emareld Hashemi	189		N/A
Turnout		5,364	44.7	+9.1
Registered electors		10,649		
Labour hold		Swing		
Labour hold		Swing		
Labour hold		Swing		

=== Green Street East ===
Green Street East (3)
Party	Candidate	Votes	%	±%
Labour	Sharaf Mahmood	3,814	65.3	+23.4
Labour	Rohima Rahman	3,753		N/A
Labour	Nirmal Chada	3,625		N/A
Respect	Mohammed Misbah	728	12.5	−15.7
Respect	Philip Blott	708		N/A
Respect	Nosheen Saed	708		N/A
Conservative	Kabir Miah	703	12.0	+1.9
Conservative	Ghulam Minhas	591		N/A
Conservative	Mohammed Choudhury	555		N/A
UKIP	Robert Rush	338	5.8	N/A
CPA	Yvonne Perry	259	4.4	−1.7
CPA	Michael Abrahams	232		N/A
CPA	Sharmila Swarma	181		N/A
Turnout		6,038	50.6	+10.5
Registered electors		10,723		
Labour hold		Swing		
Labour hold		Swing		
Labour hold		Swing		

=== Green Street West ===
Green Street West (3)
Party	Candidate	Votes	%	±%
Labour	Mukesh Patel	3,181	57.3	+22.3
Labour	Rustam Talati	3,172		N/A
Labour	Harvinder Singh Virdee	3,004		N/A
Respect	Ashfaq Ahmed	1,362	24.6	−15.9
Respect	Sabia Kamall	1,286		N/A
Respect	Abdul Sheikh	1,189		N/A
Conservative	Emran Chowdhury	800	14.4	+7.8
Conservative	Ahmer Khan	662		N/A
Conservative	Ishfaq Gul	553		N/A
CPA	Claire Waite	204	3.7	+0.5
CPA	Sunday Alyegbusi	182		N/A
CPA	Emmanuel Kplkpl	151		N/A
Turnout		5,769	51.8	+7.9
Registered electors		10,169		
Labour gain from Respect		Swing		
Labour gain from Respect		Swing		
Labour gain from Respect		Swing		

=== Little Ilford ===
Little Ilford (3)
Party	Candidate	Votes	%	±%
Labour	Andrew Baikie	3,120	56.7	+21.4
Labour	Kahlil Kazi	3,028		N/A
Labour	Farah Nazeer	2,949		N/A
Conservative	Harun Rashid	805	14.6	−4.0
Respect	Foysol Ahmed	785	14.3	−6.4
Respect	Mohammed Shipon	754		N/A
Conservative	Attic Rahman	695		N/A
Conservative	Paizah Malek-Neave	568		N/A
Respect	Abdul Rauf	447		N/A
Liberal Democrats	Christine Dolyak	366	6.6	−3.1
CPA	Philip Buley	255	4.6	−2.2
CPA	Dorcas Oshungbore	193		N/A
Independent	Paul Dyer	176	3.2	N/A
CPA	Abayomi Talwo	168		N/A
Independent	Donareen Bramwell	154		N/A
Turnout		5,294	48.7	+13.8
Registered electors		9,938		
Labour hold		Swing		
Labour hold		Swing		
Labour hold		Swing		

=== Manor Park ===
Manor Park (3)
Party	Candidate	Votes	%	±%
Labour	Salim Patel	3,624	65.4	+26.6
Labour	Kay Scoresby	3,426		N/A
Labour	Amarjit Singh	3,296		N/A
Conservative	Mahbub Ahmed	1,261	22.7	+5.8
Conservative	Shafi Choudhury	1,091		N/A
Conservative	Tricia Webb	854		N/A
CPA	Paul Jobson	353	6.4	−1.7
Communities United	Pervez Akhtar	307	5.5	N/A
Communities United	Runina Azam	295		N/A
CPA	Owen Moyo	228		N/A
CPA	Sashir Kakumam	178		N/A
Communities United	Rob Kolsuma	127		N/A
Turnout		5,498	48.7	+12.5
Registered electors		10,336		
Labour hold		Swing		
Labour hold		Swing		
Labour hold		Swing		

=== Plaistow North ===
Plaistow North (3)
Party	Candidate	Votes	%	±%
Labour	Forhad Hussain	2,967	57.3	+17.3
Labour	Alan Griffiths	2,840		N/A
Labour	Joy Laguda	2,607		N/A
Liberal Democrats	Antonio de Chavez	639	12.3	N/A
Liberal Democrats	Monir Shalkh	634		N/A
Respect	Mohshin Kuzi	573	11.1	−22.5
Respect	Umar Saeed	543		N/A
Conservative	Leslie Smith	527	10.2	−2.6
Conservative	Barbara Postles	491		N/A
Conservative	Stephen White	489		N/A
Respect	Kamran Yousaf	431		N/A
CPA	Sandra East	250	4.8	−5.7
CPA	Christopher Walker	237		N/A
Independent	Randy Kellman	225	4.3	N/A
CPA	Doreen Icindor	208		N/A
Turnout		4,968	49.3	+13.9
Registered electors		9,247		
Labour hold		Swing		
Labour hold		Swing		
Labour hold		Swing		

=== Plaistow South ===
Plaistow South (3)
Party	Candidate	Votes	%	±%
Labour	Sheila Thomas	2,967	61.1	+20.4
Labour	Neil Wilson	2,934		N/A
Labour	Ibiene Fiberesima	2,894		N/A
Conservative	Damian Sutton	975	20.1	+6.9
Conservative	Elaine Sutton	828		N/A
Conservative	Graham Postles	808		N/A
CPA	Douglas Bailey	491	10.1	+0.8
Communities United	Osman Ali	423	8.7	N/A
CPA	Martin Walker	377		N/A
CPA	Jacqueline Mwanlki	359		N/A
Communities United	Tridib Deb	129		N/A
Communities United	Rasak Sulu-Lola	126		N/A
Turnout		4,891	47.4	+15.5
Registered electors		9,395		
Labour hold		Swing		
Labour hold		Swing		
Labour hold		Swing		

=== Royal Docks ===
Royal Docks (3)
Party	Candidate	Votes	%	±%
Labour	Steve Brayshaw	1,815	55.1	+8.6
Labour	Pat Murphy	1,693		N/A
Labour	Tony McAlmont	1,666		N/A
Conservative	Neil Pearce	1,242	37.7	+6.2
Conservative	Lionel Etan-Adollo	1,080		N/A
Conservative	Cloey Wong	1,022		N/A
CPA	William Perry	236	7.2	−5.0
CPA	Benjamin Stafford	184		N/A
CPA	Jennifer Thomas	183		N/A
Turnout		3,383	43.6	+16.4
Registered electors		6,989		
Labour hold		Swing		
Labour hold		Swing		
Labour hold		Swing		

=== Stratford and New Town ===
Stratford and New Town (3)
Party	Candidate	Votes	%	±%
Labour	Charlene McLean	3,411	69.6	+25.5
Labour	Richard Crawford	3,381		N/A
Labour	Terry Paul	3,239		N/A
Conservative	Peter Fox	1,052	21.5	+10.2
Conservative	Armyn Hennessy	918		N/A
Conservative	Tim Roll-Pickering	788		N/A
CPA	Sheila Brown	440	9.0	±0.0
CPA	Carol Adams	341		N/A
CPA	Christina Doyle	333		N/A
Turnout		5,118	43.3	+15.4
Registered electors		10,764		
Labour hold		Swing		
Labour hold		Swing		
Labour hold		Swing		

=== Wall End ===
Wall End (3)
Party	Candidate	Votes	%	±%
Labour	Omana Gangadharan	3,560	54.0	+13.1
Labour	Lester Hudson	3,316		N/A
Labour	Ted Sparrowhawk	3,263		N/A
Conservative	Moses Rajkumar	1,245	18.9	−0.4
Liberal Democrats	Jawad Khan	983	14.9	N/A
Conservative	Gopi Benoy	910		N/A
Conservative	Andrew Credgington	820		N/A
Liberal Democrats	Annasalam Pirapaharan	794		N/A
Independent	Varathoesswaran Kanagasundaram	533	8.1	N/A
CPA	Rhona Balley	269	4.1	−3.5
CPA	Tony Ade-Blatze	158		N/A
CPA	Zeeshan Sundhu	117		N/A
Turnout		5,940	51.3	+11.1
Registered electors		10,410		
Labour hold		Swing		
Labour hold		Swing		
Labour hold		Swing		

=== West Ham ===
West Ham (3)
Party	Candidate	Votes	%	±%
Labour	Freda Bourne	3,290	67.2	+26.8
Labour	Ron Manley	3,048		N/A
Labour	John Gray	2,906		N/A
Conservative	Josephine Child	866	17.7	+5.6
Conservative	Roy King	759		N/A
Conservative	Danuta Gradoslelska	615		N/A
CPA	Terrence Johnson	414	8.5	−0.7
Independent	Eva Macadangdan	323	6.6	N/A
CPA	Mary Oshin	320		N/A
CPA	Leonard West	299		N/A
Turnout		4,765	45.8	+15.0
Registered electors		9,370		
Labour hold		Swing		
Labour hold		Swing		
Labour hold		Swing		

== By-elections between 2010 and 2014 ==
There were no by-elections.
