= 2002 London local elections =

- 2 May 2002

All 1,861 on all 32 London boroughs
- Turnout: 31.8% (▼3.0%)
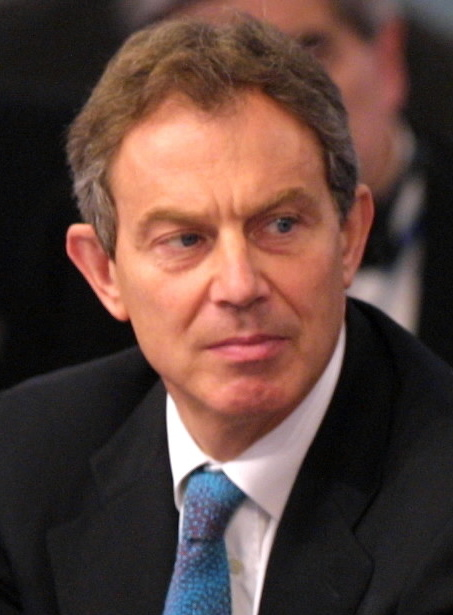

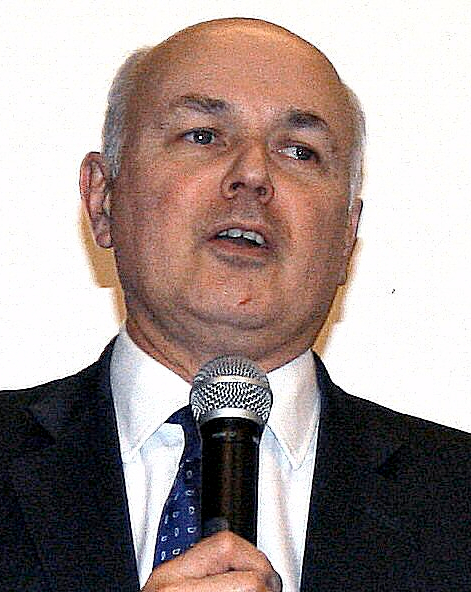

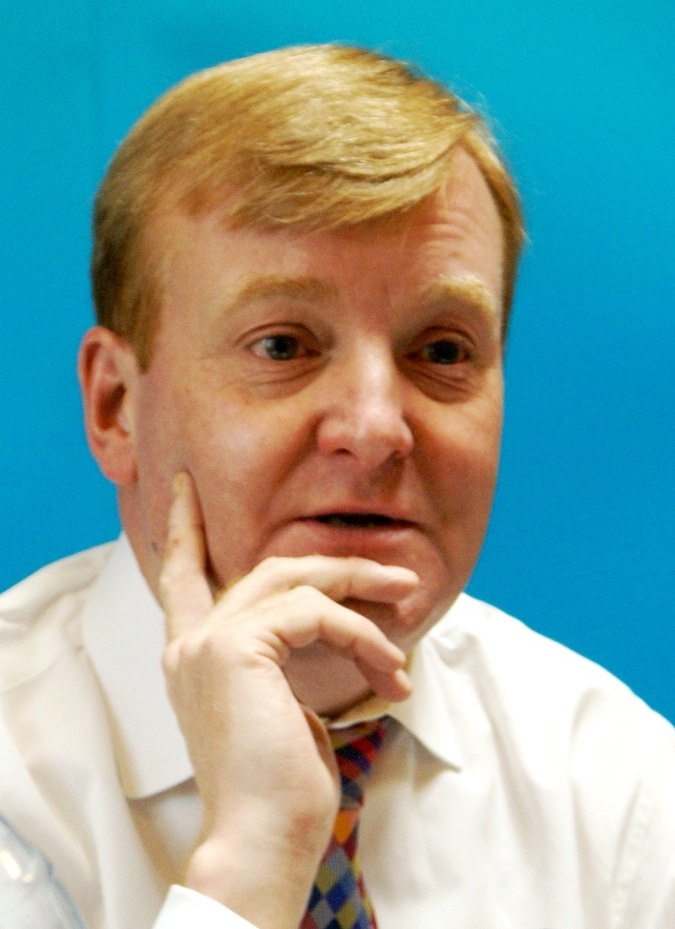
	First party	Second party	Third party
Leader	Tony Blair	Iain Duncan Smith	Charles Kennedy
Party	Labour	Conservative	Liberal Democrats
Popular vote	586,290	587,161	353,833
Percentage	34.1%	34.1%	20.6%
Swing	▼6.6%	▲2.1%	▼0.2%
Councils	15	8	3
Councils +/–	▼3	▲4	▲1
Councillors	866	654	307
Councillors +/–	▼184	▲116	▲6
- Results by Borough in 2002.

Local government elections took place in London, and some other parts of the United Kingdom on Thursday 2 May 2002. Ward changes took place in every borough, following a series of reviews and 32 statutory instruments which reduced the total number of councillors by 56 from 1,917 to 1,861.

All London borough council seats were up for election. The London Conservatives narrowly won the popular vote across the city by a margin of 871 votes, increased their number of councillors by 115 and won control of 4 more councils. However, London Labour won a plurality of council seats (866) and councils (15), though this was a decline from the 1,050 councillors and 18 councils they had won in 1998. It was the first time ever that a political party had won the most seats and councils in a London borough election whilst losing the London-wide popular vote.

In Hackney there was also a mayoral referendum vote.

== Results summary ==
Party	Votes won	% votes	Change	Seats	% seats	Change	Councils	Change
Conservative	587,161	34.1	+2.1	654	35.1	+116	8	+4
Labour	586,290	34.1	-6.6	866	46.5	-184	15	-3
Liberal Democrats	353,833	20.6	-0.2	307	16.5	+6	3	+1
Green	95,394	5.5	+2.6	1	0.1	-1	0	±0
Others	97,938	5.7	+2.1	33	1.8	+7	0	±0
No overall control	n/a	n/a	n/a	n/a	n/a	n/a	6	-2

- Turnout: 1,653,654 voters cast ballots, a turnout of 31.8% (-3.0%).

== Council results ==
Council	Previous control	Result	Details
Barking and Dagenham	Labour	Labour	Details
Barnet	No overall control	Conservative	Details
Bexley	Conservative	Labour	Details
Brent	Labour	Labour	Details
Bromley	No overall control	Conservative	Details
Camden	Labour	Labour	Details
Croydon	Labour	Labour	Details
Ealing	Labour	Labour	Details
Enfield	Labour	Conservative	Details
Greenwich	Labour	Labour	Details
Hackney	No overall control	Labour	Details
Hammersmith and Fulham	Labour	Labour	Details
Haringey	Labour	Labour	Details
Harrow	Labour	No overall control	Details
Havering	No overall control	No overall control	Details
Hillingdon	No overall control	No overall control	Details
Hounslow	Labour	Labour	Details
Islington	No overall control	Liberal Democrats	Details
Kensington and Chelsea	Conservative	Conservative	Details
Kingston upon Thames	No overall control	Liberal Democrats	Details
Lambeth	Labour	No overall control	Details
Lewisham	Labour	Labour	Details
Merton	Labour	Labour	Details
Newham	Labour	Labour	Details
Redbridge	No overall control	Conservative	Details
Richmond upon Thames	Liberal Democrats	Conservative	Details
Southwark	Labour	No overall control	Details
Sutton	Liberal Democrats	Liberal Democrats	Details
Tower Hamlets	Labour	Labour	Details
Waltham Forest	Labour	No overall control	Details
Wandsworth	Conservative	Conservative	Details
Westminster	Conservative	Conservative	Details

== Overall councillor numbers ==
London local elections 2002 Councillor statistics
Party	Seats	Gain/loss
Labour	866	-184
Conservative	654	+115
Liberal Democrats	307	+6
Havering Residents Association	12	
Chadwell Heath Residents Association	4	
Merton Park Ward Residents Association	3	
Rainham & Wennington Independent Residents Group	3	
South Hornchurch Independent Residents Group	3	
Community Group	3	
A future for Brentford FC in your Community	1	
CPA	1	
Green	1	
Local Education Action by Parents	1	
Socialist	1	

== Ward result maps ==
=== London-wide ===
The map below shows the results for each ward across the whole of Greater London.

2002 London local elections results map

=== By borough ===
Barking and Dagenham 2002 results map

Barnet 2002 results map

Bexley 2002 results map

Brent 2002 results map

Bromley 2002 results map

Camden 2002 results map

Croydon 2002 results map

Ealing 2002 results map

Enfield 2002 results map

Greenwich 2002 results map

Hackney 2002 results map

Hammersmith and Fulham 2002 results map

Haringey 2002 results map

Harrow 2002 results map

Havering 2002 results map

Hillingdon 2002 results map

Hounslow 2002 results map

Islington 2002 results map

Kensington and Chelsea 2002 results map

Kingston upon Thames 2002 results map

Lambeth 2002 results map

Lewisham 2002 results map

Merton 2002 results map

Newham 2002 results map

Redbridge 2002 results map

Richmond upon Thames 2002 results map

Southwark 2002 results map

Sutton 2002 results map

Tower Hamlets 2002 results map

Waltham Forest 2002 results map

Wandsworth 2002 results map

Westminster 2002 results map
