= 2006 Newham London Borough Council election =

2006 local election in England

2006 Newham Council election
- 4 May 2006

All 60 council seats to Newham London Borough Council 31 seats needed for a majority
	First party	Second party	Third party
Party	Labour	Respect	CPA
Last election	59 seats, 49.3%	Did not stand	1 seat, 4.5%
Seats won	54	3	3
Seat change	▼5	▲3	▲2
Popular vote	29,389	16,459	7,621
Percentage	41.4	23.2	10.7
Swing	▼7.9%	New party	▲6.2%
- Map of the results of the 2006 Newham council election. Christian Peoples Alliance in purple, Labour in red and Respect in light red.
Council control before election
Labour
Council control after election
Labour

Elections to Newham London Borough Council in London, England were held on 4 May 2006. The whole council, including the directly elected mayor, was up for election for the first time since the 2002 election. The Labour Party maintained control of the council.

== Election result ==
Newham local election result 2006
Party	Seats	Gains	Losses	Net gain/loss	Seats %	Votes %	Votes	+/−
Labour	54	0	5	–5	90.0	41.4	29,389	-7.9
Respect	3	3	0	+3	5.0	23.2	16,459	N/A
Conservative	0	0	0	±0	0.0	14.3	10,135	-5.6
CPA	3	2	0	+2	5.0	10.7	7,621	+6.2
Green	0	0	0	±0	0.0	5.7	4,060	-6.6
Liberal Democrats	0	0	0	±0	0.0	2.9	2,070	-1.0
Independent	0	0	0	±0	0.0	1.5	1,067	-2.3
British Public Party	0	0	0	±0	0.0	0.2	129	

== Background ==
A total of 237 candidates stood in the election for the 60 seats being contested across 20 wards. Candidates included a full slate from the Labour party (as had been the case at every election since the borough council had been formed in 1964), whilst the Conservative party also ran a full slate and the Liberal Democrats ran 10 candidates. Respect, running for the first time, also ran a full slate. Other candidates running were 12 Greens, 29 Christian Peoples Alliance, and 6 Independents.

== Results by ward ==
=== Beckton ===
Beckton (3)
Party	Candidate	Votes	%	±%
Labour	Alec Kellaway	1,188	45.1	−1.3
Labour	Christine Bowden	1,187		N/A
Labour	Ayesha Chowdhury	1,130		N/A
Conservative	Reza Choudhury	627	23.8	+7.7
Conservative	Paul Clark	593		N/A
Conservative	Rashid Salik	455		N/A
Respect	Aisha Siddiqah	448	17.0	N/A
Respect	Tipu Rahman	413		N/A
Respect	Mubin Haq	386		N/A
CPA	Lynn Donaldson	369	14.0	N/A
CPA	Jason Yasin	230		N/A
Turnout		2,536	26.6	+5.2
Registered electors		9,518		
Labour hold		Swing		
Labour hold		Swing		
Labour hold		Swing		

=== Boleyn ===
Boleyn (3)
Party	Candidate	Votes	%	±%
Labour	June Leitch	1,627	44.2	−4.8
Labour	Riad Mirza	1,547		N/A
Labour	Pearson Shillingford	1,512		N/A
Respect	Moshiur Molla	1,219	33.1	N/A
Respect	Edward Davies	1,082		N/A
Respect	Omar Khawaja	1,007		N/A
Conservative	Aminur Choudhury	528	14.3	−7.2
Conservative	Ahmed Iqbal	484		N/A
Conservative	Rose Irtwange	426		N/A
CPA	David Bamber	308	8.4	−2.3
Turnout		3,578	37.8	+10.3
Registered electors		9,478		
Labour hold		Swing		
Labour hold		Swing		
Labour hold		Swing		

=== Canning Town North ===
Canning Town North (3)
Party	Candidate	Votes	%	±%
Labour	Marie Collier	1,443	54.4	+14.8
Labour	Paul Schafer	1,310		N/A
Labour	Clive Furness	1,232		N/A
CPA	Sydney Burnett	524	19.8	+6.3
CPA	John Jackson	507		N/A
Conservative	Mohammed Miah	373	14.1	N/A
Conservative	Nazrul Islam	345		N/A
CPA	Pervaiz Khan	326		N/A
Respect	Mohamed Farah	313	11.8	N/A
Respect	Sayad Mohammed	311		N/A
Conservative	Felicia Nwoye	293		N/A
Respect	Yuri Prasad	225		N/A
Turnout		2,679	27.5	+4.7
Registered electors		9,729		
Labour hold		Swing		
Labour hold		Swing		
Labour hold		Swing		

=== Canning Town South ===
Canning Town South (3)
Party	Candidate	Votes	%	±%
CPA	Alan Craig	1,536	50.9	+0.6
CPA	Denise Stafford	1,170		N/A
CPA	Simeon Ademolake	1,091		N/A
Labour	Bryan Collier	927	30.7	−19.0
Labour	Alan Griffiths	887		N/A
Labour	Julie Sussex	855		N/A
Conservative	Christopher Buckwell	332	11.0	N/A
Conservative	Abul Abdullah	306		N/A
Respect	Khadija Hassan	225	7.5	N/A
Conservative	Bakary Ceesay	193		N/A
Respect	Mohammed Rob	193		N/A
Respect	Berlyne Hamilton	192		N/A
Turnout		2,845	32.8	+6.6
Registered electors		8,661		
CPA hold		Swing		
CPA gain from Labour		Swing		
CPA gain from Labour		Swing		

=== Custom House ===
Custom House (3)
Party	Candidate	Votes	%	±%
Labour	Patricia Holland	1,289	48.7	+1.4
Labour	James Butler	1,165		N/A
Labour	Conor McAuley	1,008		N/A
CPA	Beatrice Appiah	734	27.7	+15.5
CPA	Malcolm Williamson	685		N/A
CPA	Thomas Conquest	671		N/A
Conservative	Adrian Machin	328	12.4	−15.3
Conservative	Bahri Chinn	298		N/A
Respect	Abdul Ghani	295	11.1	N/A
Conservative	Navnit Hindocha	262		N/A
Respect	Kevin Davis	254		N/A
Respect	Ghada Razuki	215		N/A
Turnout		2,613	28.8	+8.5
Registered electors		9,065		
Labour hold		Swing		
Labour hold		Swing		
Labour hold		Swing		

=== East Ham Central ===
East Ham Central (3)
Party	Candidate	Votes	%	±%
Labour	Mary Skyers	1,821	48.5	−11.3
Labour	Ian Corbett	1,757		N/A
Labour	Unmesh Desai	1,720		N/A
Respect	Mohammed Nakhuda	1,090	29.0	N/A
Respect	Fazan Khaliq	1,086		N/A
Respect	Charanjeet Hullen	961		N/A
Conservative	Tufail Basith	535	14.2	−8.6
Conservative	Sadir Hussain	524		N/A
Conservative	Sadeque Miah	446		N/A
CPA	Harold Bhatty	310	8.3	N/A
Turnout		3,695	38.3	+8.9
Registered electors		9,650		
Labour hold		Swing		
Labour hold		Swing		
Labour hold		Swing		

=== East Ham North ===
East Ham North (3)
Party	Candidate	Votes	%	±%
Labour	Paul Sathianesan	1,939	44.5	+6.3
Labour	Sukhdev Singh Marway	1,760		N/A
Labour	Patricia Sheekey	1,718		N/A
Respect	Ashfaq Ahmed	1,390	31.9	N/A
Respect	Mohammed Kwawaja	1,308		N/A
Respect	Sarah Ruiz	1,299		N/A
Conservative	Mohammed Akram	685	15.7	−9.3
Conservative	Chaudhry Hussain	593		N/A
Conservative	Gopinathan Benoy	589		N/A
Green	Shana Yarnell	212	4.9	−2.1
CPA	Emmanuel Kpikpi	136	3.1	N/A
Turnout		4,244	45.2	+10.6
Registered electors		9,382		
Labour hold		Swing		
Labour hold		Swing		
Labour hold		Swing		

=== East Ham South ===
East Ham South (3)
Party	Candidate	Votes	%	±%
Labour	Kevin Jenkins	1,569	39.8	−13.5
Labour	Quintin Peppiatt	1,453		N/A
Labour	Lakmini Shah	1,224		N/A
Conservative	Rezia Choudhury	588	14.9	−10.2
Respect	Raheela Ali	556	14.1	N/A
Conservative	Enamul Haque	501		N/A
Respect	Riaz Uddin	465		N/A
Respect	Roderick Finlayson	450		N/A
Conservative	Muhammed Ul Islam	449		N/A
Independent	Frederick Jones	367	9.3	−12.3
Green	Keith McIlveen	316	8.0	N/A
CPA	Kwame Otti	305	7.7	N/A
Liberal Democrats	Abdul Kayum	241	6.1	N/A
Liberal Democrats	Anwar Hussain	223		N/A
Turnout		3,170	33.9	+9.3
Registered electors		9,356		
Labour hold		Swing		
Labour hold		Swing		
Labour hold		Swing		

=== Forest Gate North ===
Forest Gate North (3)
Party	Candidate	Votes	%	±%
Labour	Paul Brickell	1,678	42.3	+5.1
Labour	Michael Nicholas	1,552		N/A
Labour	Shama Ahmad	1,443		N/A
Respect	Muhammed Ahmed	757	19.1	N/A
Respect	Imran Mustak	720		N/A
Respect	April Williams	673		N/A
Green	Jane Lithgow	603	15.2	−7.1
Conservative	Jacqueline Burns	517	13.0	+0.8
Conservative	Charles Meaby	454		N/A
Conservative	Brian Maze	418		N/A
CPA	Stephen Williamson	409	10.3	N/A
Turnout		3,378	35.3	+8.7
Registered electors		9,558		
Labour hold		Swing		
Labour hold		Swing		
Labour hold		Swing		

=== Forest Gate South ===
Forest Gate South (3)
Party	Candidate	Votes	%	±%
Labour	Judith Garfield	1,410	36.2	−18.1
Labour	Winston Vaughan	1,408		N/A
Labour	Akbar Chaudhary	1,384		N/A
Respect	Salim Patel	1,296	33.3	N/A
Respect	Simon Shaw	1,285		N/A
Respect	Zenib Jalil	1,250		N/A
Green	Adrian Hedges	450	11.6	N/A
Conservative	Barry Roberts	430	11.0	−2.8
Conservative	David Eveleigh	425		N/A
Conservative	Ikram Wahid	380		N/A
CPA	Reginald Eade	308	7.9	N/A
Turnout		3,606	35.6	+9.1
Registered electors		10,117		
Labour hold		Swing		
Labour hold		Swing		
Labour hold		Swing		

=== Green Street East ===
Green Street East (3)
Party	Candidate	Votes	%	±%
Labour	Rohima Rahman	1,869	41.9	−10.4
Labour	Sharaf Mahmood	1,815		N/A
Labour	Abdul Shakoor	1,716		N/A
Respect	Abdurahman Jafar	1,260	28.2	N/A
Respect	Abdul Mian	1,180		N/A
Respect	Kevin Corr	1,168		N/A
Conservative	Shamim Ahmed	452	10.1	−12.2
Conservative	Mohammed Choudhury	393		N/A
Green	Abigail Kingston	316	7.1	−4.9
Conservative	Kaisar Jalal	311		N/A
Liberal Democrats	Mahbub Choudhury	294	6.6	N/A
CPA	Nigel Weekes	272	6.1	N/A
Turnout		3,962	40.1	+7.9
Registered electors		9,874		
Labour hold		Swing		
Labour hold		Swing		
Labour hold		Swing		

=== Green Street West ===
Green Street West (3)
Party	Candidate	Votes	%	±%
Respect	Asif Karim	1,829	40.4	N/A
Respect	Abdul Sheikh	1,784		N/A
Respect	Hanif Abdulmuhit	1,751		N/A
Labour	Rustam Talati	1,585	35.0	−22.1
Labour	Harvinder Singh Virdee	1,511		N/A
Labour	Nirmal Kaur Chadha	1,422		N/A
Conservative	Phyllis Paice	300	6.6	−23.0
Liberal Democrats	Shamimara Choudhury	264	5.8	N/A
Conservative	Khatija Meaby	256		N/A
Liberal Democrats	Emran Chowdhury	235		N/A
Conservative	Zubaida Hashmi	235		N/A
Green	Mary Forse	223	4.9	−8.4
Independent	Abdul Mohshin	180	4.0	N/A
CPA	Alessandra Awolowo	144	3.2	N/A
Turnout		4,179	43.9	+12.4
Registered electors		9,522		
Respect gain from Labour		Swing		
Respect gain from Labour		Swing		
Respect gain from Labour		Swing		

=== Little Ilford ===
Little Ilford (3)
Party	Candidate	Votes	%	±%
Labour	Josephine Corbett	1,387	35.3	−13.8
Labour	Andrew Baikie	1,351		N/A
Labour	Kahlil Kazi	1,261		N/A
Respect	Sajid Rehman	815	20.7	N/A
Respect	Rebecca Palmer	809		N/A
Conservative	Mahbub Ahmed	732	18.6	−20.7
Respect	Summer Shahbaz	699		N/A
Conservative	Fatema Hussain	555		N/A
Conservative	Alizaman Aurongozeb	509		N/A
Liberal Democrats	Trevor Watson	382	9.7	N/A
CPA	Reginald Gardner	266	6.8	N/A
Green	Mehmet Kani	218	5.5	−6.1
Independent	Mohammed Anjum	129	3.3	N/A
Turnout		3,300	34.9	+8.1
Registered electors		9,451		
Labour hold		Swing		
Labour hold		Swing		
Labour hold		Swing		

=== Manor Park ===
Manor Park (3)
Party	Candidate	Votes	%	±%
Labour	Kay Scoresby	1,491	38.8	−7.2
Labour	Amarjit Singh	1,457		N/A
Labour	Ayub Ali	1,402		N/A
Respect	Sana Saleem	1,032	26.9	N/A
Respect	Muhammad Misbah	1,007		N/A
Respect	Lane Taylor	890		N/A
Conservative	Rashid Ahmed	651	16.9	−20.6
Conservative	Reza Choudhury	634		N/A
Green	Mary Robinson	490	12.8	−3.7
Conservative	Michael Law	484		N/A
CPA	Ursuline Khan	179	4.7	N/A
Turnout		3,475	36.2	+2.0
Registered electors		9,596		
Labour hold		Swing		
Labour hold		Swing		
Labour hold		Swing		

=== Plaistow North ===
Plaistow North (3)
Party	Candidate	Votes	%	±%
Labour	Zulfiqar Ali	1,328	40.0	−10.4
Labour	Jonathan Knott	1,306		N/A
Labour	Joy Laguda	1,193		N/A
Respect	Forhad Hussain	1,117	33.6	N/A
Respect	Nazir Harif	1,007		N/A
Respect	Sabia Kamali	893		N/A
Conservative	Leslie Smith	424	12.8	−1.3
Conservative	Lisa Sutton	408		N/A
Conservative	Shantelle Prosper	380		N/A
CPA	Therence Johnston	350	10.5	N/A
Independent	Daudu Kuku	104	3.1	N/A
Turnout		3,082	35.4	+8.3
Registered electors		8,711		
Labour hold		Swing		
Labour hold		Swing		
Labour hold		Swing		

=== Plaistow South ===
Plaistow South (3)
Party	Candidate	Votes	%	±%
Labour	Maureen Jones	1,411	40.7	−9.3
Labour	Neil Wilson	1,410		N/A
Labour	Graham Lane	1,386		N/A
Respect	Mohammed Chowdhury	588	17.0	N/A
Respect	Rezwan Ahmed	575		N/A
Respect	Katherine Jennings	498		N/A
Liberal Democrats	Faruk Choudhury	487	14.1	+0.5
Conservative	Damian Sutton	458	13.2	−2.6
Conservative	Graham Postles	445		N/A
Conservative	Shiv Bagga	366		N/A
Liberal Democrats	Patricia Mahoney	349		N/A
CPA	Osei Asibey	321	9.3	N/A
Liberal Democrats	Jamieson Moore	318		N/A
Green	Richard Scrase	201	5.8	−8.6
Turnout		3,166	31.9	+6.9
Registered electors		9,919		
Labour hold		Swing		
Labour hold		Swing		
Labour hold		Swing		

=== Royal Docks ===
Royal Docks (3)
Party	Candidate	Votes	%	±%
Labour	Anthony McAlmot	770	46.5	+7.2
Labour	Patrick Murphy	757		N/A
Labour	Simon Tucker	756		N/A
Conservative	Julian Francis	522	31.5	+15.6
Conservative	Michelle Mendes	520		N/A
Conservative	Neil Pearce	514		N/A
CPA	William Perry	202	12.2	−3.0
CPA	Paul Jobson	190		N/A
Respect	Michael Allchin	161	9.7	N/A
Respect	Kevin Ovenden	156		N/A
Respect	Hsaio Pai	152		N/A
CPA	Benjamin Stafford	136		N/A
Turnout		1,906	27.2	+7.4
Registered electors		7,018		
Labour hold		Swing		
Labour hold		Swing		
Labour hold		Swing		

=== Stratford and New Town ===
Stratford and New Town (3)
Party	Candidate	Votes	%	±%
Labour	David Griffin	1,399	44.1	−10.1
Labour	Regina Williams	1,380		N/A
Labour	Richard Crawford	1,371		N/A
Respect	Chorwar Zada	663	20.9	N/A
Respect	Robert Webb	631		N/A
Respect	Mohammad Bux	605		N/A
Green	Jonathan Cox	467	14.7	−3.8
Conservative	Barbara Postles	358	11.3	−6.1
Conservative	Armyn Hennessy	316		N/A
Conservative	Alexandra Gradosielska	314		N/A
CPA	Abayomi Mojeed	285	9.0	−0.8
Turnout		2,832	27.9	+4.9
Registered electors		10,170		
Labour hold		Swing		
Labour hold		Swing		
Labour hold		Swing		

=== Wall End ===
Wall End (3)
Party	Candidate	Votes	%	±%
Labour	Omanakutty Gangadharan	1,858	40.9	−14.8
Labour	Edward Sparrowhawk	1,548		N/A
Labour	Lester Hudson	1,538		N/A
Conservative	Gnanasegeram Rajkumar	877	19.3	+4.3
Respect	Abdul Rauf	832	18.3	N/A
Respect	Hanif Patel	795		N/A
Respect	Ahsan Mahboob	784		N/A
Conservative	Ratnarajeswari Indrakumar	766		N/A
Conservative	Mohammed Munem	561		N/A
Independent	Arunasalam Pirapaharan	416	9.2	N/A
CPA	Shirley Williamson	344	7.6	N/A
Green	Saif Osmani	211	4.6	−4.3
Independent	Nnamdi Ifediora	127		N/A
Turnout		3,905	40.2	+6.2
Registered electors		9,727		
Labour hold		Swing		
Labour hold		Swing		
Labour hold		Swing		

=== West Ham ===
West Ham (3)
Party	Candidate	Votes	%	±%
Labour	Freda Bourne	1,400	40.4	−5.5
Labour	Ronald Manley	1,346		N/A
Labour	Megan Harris	1,295		N/A
Respect	Abdul Rahim	573	16.5	N/A
Respect	Kevin Evans	550		N/A
Respect	Mohammed Sheikh	544		N/A
Conservative	Roy King	418	12.1	−6.2
Liberal Democrats	Kathleen Chater	402	11.6	−6.1
Conservative	Josephine Child	379		N/A
Green	Paul Regan	353	10.2	−7.9
CPA	Andrew Williamson	319	9.2	N/A
Conservative	Danuta Gradosielska	234		N/A
Turnout		2,834	30.8	+6.7
Registered electors		9,200		
Labour hold		Swing		
Labour hold		Swing		
Labour hold		Swing		

== By-elections between 2006 and 2010 ==
=== Royal Docks ===
Royal Docks by-election, 26 March 2009
Party	Candidate	Votes	%	±%
Labour	Stephen Brayshaw	723	46.3	−0.2
Conservative	Neil Pearce	708	45.4	+13.9
UKIP	Anne-Marie Philip	94	6.0	N/A
Respect	Haroon Juneja	35	2.3	−7.4
Majority		15	0.9	N/A
Turnout			23.6	−3.6
Registered electors				
Labour hold		Swing		

The by-election was called following the death of Cllr Simon Tucker.
