= 2014 Newham London Borough Council election =

2014 local election in England

2014 Newham Council election
- 22 May 2014

All 60 council seats to Newham London Borough Council 30 seats needed for a majority
	First party
Party	Labour
Last election	60 seats, 60.8%
Seats won	60
Seat change	Steady
Popular vote	46,882
Percentage	59.7
Swing	▼1.1%
- Map of the results of the 2014 Newham council election. Labour in red.
Largest Party before election
Labour
Largest Party
Labour

The 2014 Newham London Borough Council election took place on 22 May 2014 to elect members of Newham London Borough Council in England. This was on the same day as other local elections.

== Summary results ==
Labour won all 60 seats, as it did in 2010.

Newham local election result 2014
Party	Seats	Gains	Losses	Net gain/loss	Seats %	Votes %	Votes	+/−
Labour	60	0	0	±0.0	100.0	59.7	46,882	-1.1
Conservative	0	0	0	±0.0	0.0	23.0	18,053	+4.4
CPA	0	0	0	±0.0	0.0	5.7	4,507	-2.4
UKIP	0	0	0	±0.0	0.0	4.2	3,299	+3.9
Liberal Democrats	0	0	0	±0.0	0.0	3.5	2,737	-0.9
TUSC	0	0	0	±0.0	0.0	2.4	1,887	N/A
Green	0	0	0	±0.0	0.0	0.7	562	-0.2
Independent	0	0	0	±0.0	0.0	0.5	355	-1.5
Communist	0	0	0	±0.0	0.0	0.2	120	N/A
Communities United	0	0	0	±0.0	0.0	0.1	105	N/A

== Background ==
A total of 208 candidates stood in the election for the 60 seats being contested across 20 wards. Candidates included a full slate from the Labour Party (as had been the case at every election since the borough council had been formed in 1964), whilst the Conservative Party also ran a full slate and the Liberal Democrats ran 11 candidates. Other candidates running were 55 Christian Peoples Alliance, 8 TUSC, 7 UKIP, 1 Communities United Party, 2 Green, 1 Communist Party and 3 Independents.

== Ward results ==
=== Beckton ===
Beckton (3)
Party	Candidate	Votes	%	±%
Labour	David Christie	1,789	22.0	N/A
Labour	Ayesha Chowdhury	1,778	21.0	N/A
Labour	Alec Kellaway	1,713	21.0	N/A
Conservative	Syed Hussain Ahmed	1,033	12.0	N/A
Conservative	Adam Nowacki	731	9.0	N/A
Conservative	Emmanuel Obasi	615	7.0	N/A
CPA	Winky Newman	242	3.0	N/A
CPA	Chike Dunkwu	204	2.0	N/A
CPA	Yomi Taimo	180	2.0	N/A
Turnout		3,340	31.8	−8.8
Registered electors		10,504		
Labour hold		Swing		
Labour hold		Swing		
Labour hold		Swing		

=== Boleyn ===
Boleyn (3)
Party	Candidate	Votes	%	±%
Labour	Obaid Khan	2,658	24.0	N/A
Labour	Charity Fiberesima	2,505	23.0	N/A
Labour	Harvinder Singh Virdee	2,425	22.0	N/A
Conservative	Jamal Uddin	869	8.0	N/A
Conservative	Yasir Asif	823	8.0	N/A
Conservative	Yaseen Farmer	756	7.0	N/A
TUSC	Ben Robinson	342	3.0	N/A
CPA	Barbara Chukwurah	270	2.0	N/A
CPA	Stephen Williamson	259	2.0	N/A
Turnout		4,261	44.0	−4.7
Registered electors		9,689		
Labour hold		Swing		
Labour hold		Swing		
Labour hold		Swing		

=== Canning Town North ===
Canning Town North(3)
Party	Candidate	Votes	%	±%
Labour	Ann Easter	2,036	23.0	N/A
Labour	Clive Furness	1,934	22.0	N/A
Labour	Kay Scoresby	1,835	21.0	N/A
UKIP	David Mears	635	7.0	N/A
Conservative	Wahid Ali	622	7.0	N/A
Conservative	Margaret Boateng	581	7.0	N/A
Conservative	Maxwell Marah	388	4.0	N/A
CPA	Moriam Fabode	262	3.0	N/A
CPA	Ruth Karashani	221	3.0	N/A
CPA	Charles Mrewa	196	2.0	N/A
Turnout		3,523	35.9	−4.3
Registered electors		9,827		
Labour hold		Swing		
Labour hold		Swing		
Labour hold		Swing		

=== Canning Town South ===
Canning Town South (3)
Party	Candidate	Votes	%	±%
Labour	Bryan Collier	1,896	23.0	N/A
Labour	Alan Griffiths	1,600	19.0	N/A
Labour	Sheila Thomas	1,581	19.0	N/A
UKIP	Kay McKenzie	657	8.0	N/A
Conservative	Abul Abdullah	632	8.0	N/A
Conservative	Gareth Knight	537	7.0	N/A
Conservative	Jaja Nabudde	420	5.0	N/A
CPA	Faith Johnson	387	5.0	N/A
CPA	Benjamin Stafford	279	3.0	N/A
CPA	Ethel Odiete	237	3.0	N/A
Turnout		3,352	33.0	−10.8
Registered electors		10,170		
Labour hold		Swing		
Labour hold		Swing		
Labour hold		Swing		

=== Custom House ===
Custom House (3)
Party	Candidate	Votes	%	±%
Labour	Patricia Holland	1,745	25.0	N/A
Labour	Rokhsana Fiaz	1,403	20.0	N/A
Labour	Conor McAuley	1,400	20.0	N/A
UKIP	Jamie McKenzie	540	8.0	N/A
Conservative	Emily Knight	452	6.0	N/A
Conservative	Jimmy Songa	389	5.0	N/A
CPA	Lynda Comson	323	5.0	N/A
Conservative	Naz Uddin	312	4.0	N/A
CPA	Owen Moyo	235	3.0	N/A
CPA	Kayode Shedowo	189	3.0	N/A
Communities United	Najma Saher	105	1.0	N/A
Turnout		2,833	32.2	−9.1
Registered electors		8,811		
Labour hold		Swing		
Labour hold		Swing		
Labour hold		Swing		

=== East Ham Central ===
East Ham Central (3)
Party	Candidate	Votes	%	±%
Labour	Ian Corbett	2,591	22.0	N/A
Labour	Unmesh Desai	2,568	21.0	N/A
Labour	Julianne Marriott	2,525	21.0	N/A
Conservative	Mohammed Azharuddin	1,216	10.0	N/A
Conservative	Abdul Motin	1,129	9.0	N/A
Conservative	Dipti Bakshi	1,082	9.0	N/A
Liberal Democrats	David Thorpe	231	2.0	N/A
CPA	Dominic Anthony	190	2.0	N/A
CPA	Cecilia Jameson	173	1.0	N/A
TUSC	Helen Pattison	160	1.0	N/A
CPA	Roja Chikka	119	1.0	N/A
Turnout		4,091	42.5	−9.0
Registered electors		10,140		
Labour hold		Swing		
Labour hold		Swing		
Labour hold		Swing		

=== East Ham North ===
East Ham North (3)
Party	Candidate	Votes	%	±%
Labour	Firoza Nekiwala	2,809	21.0	N/A
Labour	Zuber Gulamussen	2,741	20.0	N/A
Labour	Paul Sathianesan	2,684	20.0	N/A
Conservative	Ilyas Sharif	1,547	12.0	N/A
Conservative	Duraimurugan Kannan	1,335	10.0	N/A
Conservative	Biju Gopinath	1,282	10.0	N/A
Liberal Democrats	Sunny Latif	496	4.0	N/A
TUSC	Keerthikan Thennavan	131	1.0	N/A
Communist	Rod Finlayson	120	1.0	N/A
CPA	Akorede Opemiyan	92	1.0	N/A
CPA	Margaret Sadiq	85	1.0	N/A
CPA	Moriamo Sadiq	68	1.0	N/A
Turnout		5,037	52.0	−0.3
Registered electors		9,693		
Labour hold		Swing		
Labour hold		Swing		
Labour hold		Swing		

=== East Ham South ===
East Ham South (3)
Party	Candidate	Votes	%	±%
Labour	Susan Masters	2,372	23.0	N/A
Labour	Quintin Peppiatt	2,272	22.0	N/A
Labour	Lakmini Shah	2,100	21.0	N/A
Conservative	Kamal Hussain	917	9.0	N/A
Conservative	Nasima Khatun	823	8.0	N/A
Conservative	Charles Meaby	701	7.0	N/A
TUSC	Steve Hedley	307	3.0	N/A
CPA	Alex Latim	537	2.0	N/A
CPA	Tony Ade-Blaize	211	2.0	N/A
CPA	Alice Olaiya	209	2.0	N/A
Turnout		4,091	42.5	−5.8
Registered electors		9,616		
Labour hold		Swing		
Labour hold		Swing		
Labour hold		Swing		

=== Forest Gate North ===
Forest Gate North (3)
Party	Candidate	Votes	%	±%
Labour	Ellie Robinson	2,324	23.0	N/A
Labour	Seyi Akiwowo	2,126	21.0	N/A
Labour	Rachel Tripp	2,120	21.0	N/A
Green	Alan Cooper	562	6.0	N/A
Green	Jane Lithgow	559	6.0	N/A
Conservative	Shaeb Khan	548	6.0	N/A
Conservative	Dawn Lennon	490	5.0	N/A
Conservative	Brian Maze	480	5.0	N/A
TUSC	Bob Severn	222	2.0	N/A
Liberal Democrats	Christian Moon	206	2.0	N/A
CPA	Lynn Donaldson	174	2.0	N/A
CPA	Christina Doyle	146	1.0	N/A
Turnout		3,866	38.7	−10.6
Registered electors		9,981		
Labour hold		Swing		
Labour hold		Swing		
Labour hold		Swing		

=== Forest Gate South ===
Forest Gate South (3)
Party	Candidate	Votes	%	±%
Labour	Masihullah Patel	2,209	22.0	N/A
Labour	Dianne Walls	2,095	21.0	N/A
Labour	Winston Vaughan	2,023	20.0	N/A
Conservative	Mahboob Ahmed	993	10.0	N/A
Conservative	Asif Choudhary	976	10.0	N/A
Conservative	Tim Roll-Pickering	693	7.0	N/A
Liberal Democrats	William Heron	293	3.0	N/A
TUSC	Niall Mulholland	238	2.0	N/A
CPA	Dieutane Parson	179	2.0	N/A
CPA	Malcolm Williamson	159	2.0	N/A
Independent	Ionel Vrancianu	101	1.0	N/A
Turnout		3,938	39.1	−5.6
Registered electors		10,061		
Labour hold		Swing		
Labour hold		Swing		
Labour hold		Swing		

=== Green Street East ===
Green Street East (3)
Party	Candidate	Votes	%	±%
Labour	Rohima Rahman	2,723	22.0	N/A
Labour	Mukesh Patel	2,635	21.0	N/A
Labour	Jose Alexander	2,598	21.0	N/A
Conservative	Ashfaq Ahmed	1,348	11.0	N/A
Conservative	Shahan Ahmed	1,313	10.0	N/A
Conservative	Kamran Qureshi	1,187	9.0	N/A
UKIP	Robert Rush	290	2.0	N/A
TUSC	Lois Austin	217	2.0	N/A
CPA	Cherie Donaldson	126	1.0	N/A
CPA	Charles Laing	93	1.0	N/A
Turnout		4,894	48.8	−1.8
Registered electors		10,031		
Labour hold		Swing		
Labour hold		Swing		
Labour hold		Swing		

=== Green Street West ===
Green Street West (3)
Party	Candidate	Votes	%	±%
Labour	Hanif Abdulmuhit	2,914	23.0	N/A
Labour	Idris Ibrahim	2,756	22.0	N/A
Labour	Tahmina Rahman	2,744	21.0	N/A
Conservative	Mufti Sadruddin	1,266	10.0	N/A
Conservative	Abdul Sheikh	1,164	9.0	N/A
Conservative	Saiful Choudhury	1,136	9.0	N/A
TUSC	Mark Dunne	270	2.0	N/A
CPA	Yvonne Perry	169	1.0	N/A
CPA	Blazo Nikivorovic	135	1.0	N/A
CPA	Christopher Oching	134		N/A
Independent	Rushna Sulyman	96	1.0	N/A
Turnout		4,795	49.1	−2.7
Registered electors		9,764		
Labour hold		Swing		
Labour hold		Swing		
Labour hold		Swing		

=== Little Ilford ===
Little Ilford (3)
Party	Candidate	Votes	%	±%
Labour	Farah Nazeer	2,997	25.0	N/A
Labour	Ken Clark	2,954	25.0	N/A
Labour	Andrew Baikie	2,889	24.0	N/A
Conservative	Attic Rahman	867	7.0	N/A
Conservative	Ajab Khan	833	7.0	N/A
Conservative	Fazal Urrahman	783	7.0	N/A
Liberal Democrats	Trevor Watson	237	2.0	N/A
CPA	Oluwayemisi Anthony	186	2.0	N/A
CPA	Bunmi Taiwo	148	1.0	N/A
CPA	Prossy Namwanje	105	1.0	N/A
Turnout		4,501	45.5	−3.2
Registered electors		9,882		
Labour hold		Swing		
Labour hold		Swing		
Labour hold		Swing		

=== Manor Park ===
Manor Park (3)
Party	Candidate	Votes	%	±%
Labour	Salim Patel	2,744	25.0	N/A
Labour	Jo Corbett	2,589	24.0	N/A
Labour	Amarjit Singh	2,414	22.0	N/A
Conservative	Rahima Khatun	976	9.0	N/A
Conservative	Abdul Rafiz	904	8.0	N/A
Conservative	Sreedharan Boss	747	7.0	N/A
CPA	John Simmonds	216	2.0	N/A
CPA	Cynthia Owusu-Addai	198	2.0	N/A
Turnout		4,172	41.9	−6.8
Registered electors		9,946		
Labour hold		Swing		
Labour hold		Swing		
Labour hold		Swing		

=== Plaistow North ===
Plaistow North (3)
Party	Candidate	Votes	%	±%
Labour	Forhad Hussain	2,277	23.0	N/A
Labour	James Beckles	2,247	23.0	N/A
Labour	Joy Laguda	2,086	21.0	N/A
Conservative	Abul Kazi	903	9.0	N/A
Conservative	Mohammad Mustafa	813	8.0	N/A
Conservative	Walye Jahedi	764	8.0	N/A
Liberal Democrats	Eva Macadangdang	241	2.0	N/A
CPA	Mary Frimpong	230	2.0	N/A
CPA	Paul Jobson	213	2.0	N/A
CPA	Nnenna St. Luce	120	1.0	N/A
Turnout		3,830	41.1	−8.2
Registered electors		9,311		
Labour hold		Swing		
Labour hold		Swing		
Labour hold		Swing		

=== Plaistow South ===
Plaistow South (3)
Party	Candidate	Votes	%	±%
Labour	Aleen Alarice	2,222	21.0	N/A
Labour	Neil Wilson	2,180	21.0	N/A
Labour	Ahmed Noor	2,077	20.0	N/A
Conservative	Ashley Francis	803	8.0	N/A
Conservative	Abdul Salam	784	8.0	N/A
Conservative	Rois Miah	742	7.0	N/A
CPA	Michael Abrahams	552	5.0	N/A
UKIP	Julia Sanmartin	452	4.0	N/A
Liberal Democrats	Tony De-Chavez	233	2.0	N/A
CPA	Andrew Williamson	172	2.0	N/A
CPA	Mary Onishile	171	2.0	N/A
Turnout		3,879	47.4	−8.6
Registered electors		10,002		
Labour hold		Swing		
Labour hold		Swing		
Labour hold		Swing		

=== Royal Docks ===
Royal Docks (3)
Party	Candidate	Votes	%	±%
Labour	Steve Brayshaw	1,331	23.0	N/A
Labour	Pat Murphy	1,207	21.0	N/A
Labour	Tony McAlmont	1,201	21.0	N/A
Conservative	Chris Buckwell	515	9.0	N/A
Conservative	Alain Mbe	459	8.0	N/A
Conservative	Sam Nahk	445	8.0	N/A
UKIP	Daniel Oxley	344	6.0	N/A
CPA	Rita Isingoma	112	2.0	N/A
CPA	Francis Olawale	97	2.0	N/A
CPA	Bill Perry	95	2.0	N/A
Turnout		2,344	33.6	−10.0
Registered electors		6,982		
Labour hold		Swing		
Labour hold		Swing		
Labour hold		Swing		

=== Stratford and New Town ===
Stratford and New Town (3)
Party	Candidate	Votes	%	±%
Labour	Charlene McLean	2,582	25.0	N/A
Labour	Richard Crawford	2,517	25.0	N/A
Labour	Terry Paul	2,449	24.0	N/A
Conservative	Matt Gass	777	8.0	N/A
Conservative	Bilal Hassan	744	7.0	N/A
Conservative	Augustine Chipungu	646	6.0	N/A
CPA	Julie Afiari	199	2.0	N/A
CPA	Florence Asiwaju-Dada	174	2.0	N/A
CPA	John Falana	157	2.0	N/A
Turnout		3,933	33.6	−9.7
Registered electors		11,722		
Labour hold		Swing		
Labour hold		Swing		
Labour hold		Swing		

=== Wall End ===
Wall End (3)
Party	Candidate	Votes	%	±%
Labour	Frances Clarke	2,617	20.0	N/A
Labour	Ted Sparrowhawk	2,452	19.0	N/A
Labour	Lester Hudson	2,438	19.0	N/A
Conservative	Jawad Khan	1,152	9.0	N/A
Conservative	Biju Koshy	1,117	9.0	N/A
Conservative	Ibrar Mir	1,096	9.0	N/A
Liberal Democrats	Annasalam Pirapaharan	541	4.0	N/A
Liberal Democrats	Gopinathan Benoy	450	4.0	N/A
Liberal Democrats	Shakila Masih	448	3.0	N/A
Independent	Bob Mudhar	158	1.0	N/A
CPA	Amal Kakumanu	135	1.0	N/A
CPA	Sashir Kakumanu	124	1.0	N/A
CPA	Sharmila Swarna	122	1.0	N/A
Turnout		4,811	49.1	−2.2
Registered electors		9,808		
Labour hold		Swing		
Labour hold		Swing		
Labour hold		Swing		

=== West Ham ===
West Ham (3)
Party	Candidate	Votes	%	±%
Labour	Freda Bourne	2,046	24.0	N/A
Labour	John Whitworth	1,939	22.0	N/A
Labour	John Gray	1,913	22.0	N/A
Conservative	Farhana Firdous	617	7.0	N/A
Conservative	Mary Antwi	525	6.0	N/A
Conservative	Matej Gasparic	456	5.0	N/A
UKIP	Michael Armstrong	381	4.0	N/A
Liberal Democrats	Edgar Garen	259	3.0	N/A
CPA	Sheila Brown	231	3.0	N/A
CPA	Myrtle Laing	151	2.0	N/A
CPA	Joe Mettle	136	2.0	N/A
Turnout		3,459	45.8	−9.3
Registered electors		9,480		
Labour hold		Swing		
Labour hold		Swing		
Labour hold		Swing		

== By-elections between 2014 and 2018 ==
=== Beckton ===
Beckton by-election, 11 September 2014
Party	Candidate	Votes	%	±%
Labour	Tonii Wilson	1,006	51.0	N/A
Conservative	Syed Ahmed	584	30.0	N/A
UKIP	David Mears	215	11.0	N/A
Green	Jane Lithgow	70	4.0	N/A
Liberal Democrats	David Thorpe	43	2.0	N/A
CPA	Kayode Shedowo	33	2.0	N/A
TUSC	Mark Dunne	21	1.0	N/A
Majority		422	21.0	N/A
Turnout		1,972	18.8	−13.0
Registered electors		10,510		
Labour hold		Swing		

The by-election was called following the death of Cllr Alec Kellaway.

=== Stratford and New Town ===
Stratford and New Town by-election, 7 May 2015
Party	Candidate	Votes	%	±%
Labour	Charlene McLean	4,607	57.0	N/A
Conservative	Matthew Gass	1,778	22.0	N/A
Green	Isabelle Anderson	1,170	14.0	N/A
UKIP	Jamie McKenzie	403	5.0	N/A
CPA	Joe Mettle	99	1.0	N/A
TUSC	Bob Severn	70	1.0	N/A
Majority		2,829	35.0	N/A
Turnout		8,127	54.1	+20.5
Registered electors		15,024		
Labour hold		Swing		

The by-election was called following the disqualification due to non-attendance of Cllr Charlene McLean. The election was held on the same day as the 2015 general election.

=== Boleyn ===
Boleyn by-election, 3 December 2015
Party	Candidate	Votes	%	±%
Labour	Veronica Oakeshott	1,440	72.0	N/A
Liberal Democrats	Sheree Miller	181	9.0	N/A
Conservative	Emmanuel Finndoro-Obasi	171	9.0	N/A
Green	Frankie-Rose Taylor	117	6.0	N/A
UKIP	David Mears	78	4.0	N/A
Independent	Diane Ofori	10	1.0	N/A
Majority		1,259	63.0	N/A
Turnout		1,997	20.8	−23.2
Registered electors		9,602		
Labour hold		Swing		

The by-election was called following the death of Cllr Charity Fibresima

=== Forest Gate North ===
Forest Gate North by-election, 14 July 2016
Party	Candidate	Votes	%	±%
Labour	Anamul Islam	1,150	53.0	N/A
Green	Elisabeth Whitebread	681	31.0	N/A
Conservative	John Oxley	301	14.0	N/A
Liberal Democrats	James Rumsby	57	3.0	N/A
Majority		469	22.0	N/A
Turnout		2,189	21.3	−17.4
Registered electors		10,290		
Labour hold		Swing		

The by-election was called following the resignation of Cllr Ellie Robinson to accept a job with the Mayor of London, Sadiq Khan.
