= One Pound Fish Man =

Pakistani singer-songwriter (born 1981)

Muhammad Shahid Nazir
- سیٹھ شاہد نذیر
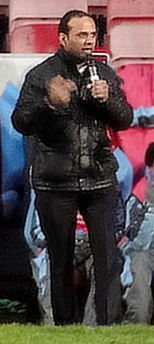
- Nazir performing for West Ham fans, 2012
- Born: Muhammad Shahid Nazir; 18 October 1981 (age 45); Pattoki, Punjab, Pakistan
- Occupation: Singer-songwriter • fishmonger
- Musical career
- Also known as: One Pound Fish Man (£1 Fish Man)
- Origin: Upton Park, London, England
- Genre: Novelty song
- Instrument: Vocals
- Years active: 2012–13
- Label: Warner
- Website: Official Instagram

Muhammad Shahid Nazir (Urdu, Punjabi: محمد شاہد نذیر; born 18 October 1981), also known as the One Pound Fish Man, is a Pakistani trader and singer-songwriter who found Internet fame with his viral video, "One Pound Fish". His subsequent appearance on The X Factor led to a record deal with Warner Music.

== Personal life ==
Nazir was born in the town of Pattoki, near Lahore in Punjab, Pakistan. He grew up listening to Bollywood and Punjabi music, and would sing religious songs during assembly at school. Prior to emigrating to the United Kingdom, Nazir worked for the family-owned transport company. He is married to Kashifa. The couple have four children. His mother, wife and children are still living in Pattoki. Nazir is a Muslim.

== Career ==
=== "One Pound Fish" ===
Following brief employment at a pound shop, Nazir, who had since settled in East London, began work at a fish stall at Queen's Market, Upton Park, where his employer instructed him to use a trader's call to attract customers. He soon composed the song "One Pound Fish":

(Chorus)

Come on, ladies, come on, ladies Come on, ladies, come on, ladies One pound fish

[Verse 1] Have a, have a look, one pound fish Have a, have a look, one pound fish Very, very good, one pound fish Very, very cheap, one pound fish Six for five pound, one pound each Six for five pound, one pound each Very, very good and very, very cheap (One pound, one pound)

[Chorus] Come on, ladies, come on, ladies Come on, ladies, come on, ladies Come on, ladies, come on, ladies One pound fish Come on, ladies, come on, ladies Come on, ladies, come on, ladies One pound fish

[Verse 2] (Come on, ladies, come on, ladies) (Come on, ladies, come on, ladies) Have a, have a look, one pound fish Have a, have a look, one pound fish Very, very good, one pound fish Very, very cheap, one pound fish Six for five pound, one pound each

Six for five pound, one pound fish

After passing customers uploaded videos of him performing his song onto YouTube (in 2012) it became an internet smash and a viral video, and he subsequently auditioned on the television show The X Factor singing the song. The song was later covered by Alesha Dixon, Timbaland and Mindless Behavior.

In a 2018 Vice interview, Nazir recounted his shock at the song's online popularity, describing it as a "god-gifted idea". He added "I was second [in the YouTube charts] only after Gangnam Style [by Psy], this was because YouTube had been banned in Pakistan at that time. Otherwise I would definitely have been number one". Nazir said UK supermarket Tesco had asked him to appear in advertisements alongside Kevin Bacon and Angelina Jolie, an offer which he declined due to an exclusivity deal he had in place with PTCL.

=== Post X Factor ===
In November 2012, Nazir was signed by Warner Music Group as a recording artist, and released a dance version of his market sales pitch. A video was also filmed which featured Bollywood-style dancers and an appearance from former weather forecaster Michael Fish. The song was in the running for securing the Christmas number one for 2012 alongside X Factor winner James Arthur's release of his winning song "Impossible".

On 9 January 2021, a music video for "One Pound Juice" featuring Nazir was uploaded to YouTube, using adapted lyrics based on the original "One Pound Fish" song, to reflect Nazir's new business venture in selling bottles of UK-made e-cigarette liquid for use in e-cigarettes.

=== Return to Pakistan ===
Nazir's fame alerted the UK's immigration services. Nazir had arrived in the United Kingdom in 2011 on a student visa, however he instead began work as a fishmonger. In December 2012, under the government policy he was ordered to leave the country as his visa had expired. He returned to Pakistan in December 2012, following which he originally intended to apply for a French visa, in order to release a new single. However, his management later stated he would return to the UK to promote his musical career with a new entry visa. His agent, Samir Ahmed, said: "He will be returning to Pakistan and will be celebrating New Year with his family. His return to the UK is pending approval of a working visa. We fully expect him to return in the coming weeks". According to a 2016 article in the New Statesman, Nazir was declined a new visa to enter the UK because he violated the terms of his last visa by singing as a professional entertainer. A year after that he applied for another visa to try and appear in a film about his life, however it was also denied.

On his return to Pakistan, Nazir began delivering motivational speeches in universities across the country, alongside serving as a brand ambassador for PTCL. In 2013, Nazir released "Dabang Sher Aaya", a song written in support of Nawaz Sharif's election campaign in Pakistan, which later became the Pakistan Muslim League (N)'s official party anthem. Another song, "Hum Sher Dil Hum Sher Jawan" was later released ahead of the Pakistani election on 25 July.

In September 2013, it was reported that an arrest warrant had been issued for Nazir in Lahore, in relation to a criminal complaint filed by Orix Leasing Company concerning an initial recovery suit of Rs.6.6 million, following an unpaid loan issued to Nazir's company Rajpoot Goods Transport in 2007. In 2008, a case had been registered against the company after it failed to deposit initial instalments of the loan. Nazir later negotiated a deal with Orix, agreeing to pay Rs.1.34 million through 11 cheques of Rs.94,000 each, however the cheques were found to be counterfeit. Nazir had previously failed to attend a court hearing surrounding the legal process, which led to his arrest in 2013. A further arrest warrant was later withdrawn following his assurance to observe court orders, with a hearing scheduled for 9 April 2014.

== Discography ==
=== Singles ===
List of singles, with selected chart positions, showing year released and album name
Title	Year	Peak chart positions				Album
Title	Year	UK	UK Asian Chart	FRA	SCO	Album
"One Pound Fish"	2012	28	1	169	24	Non-album single
"—" denotes a recording that did not chart.
