= One Pound Fish =

Single by One Pound Fish Man
- Released: 7 December 2012
- Recorded: 2012
- Studio: J. DEVLIN NIDDRY
- Genre: Bhangra; dance-pop
- Length: 2:27
- Label: Warner Music Group
- Songwriter: Muhammad Shahid Nazir
- Producer: Lisa Mc

Music video
- "One Pound Fish" on YouTube

"One Pound Fish", often written as "£1 Fish", is a novelty song performed by the British-based Pakistani fish trader and recording artist Muhammad Shahid Nazir, credited as One Pound Fish Man. It was released on 7 December 2012 for download in the United Kingdom, reaching number 28 in the UK singles chart, number 4 in the UK Dance Singles Chart, and number 1 in the UK Asian Chart.

== Background ==
Following brief employment at a pound shop, Muhammad Shahid Nazir, a Pakistani immigrant to UK, originating from the town of Pattoki in Punjab, who had settled in East London, began work on a fish stall at Queen's Market, Upton Park where his employer instructed him to use a trader's call to attract customers. He soon composed the song "One Pound Fish".

It became a viral video after passing customers uploaded videos of Nazir performing his song onto YouTube.

A music video to accompany the release of "One Pound Fish" was first released on 10 December 2012 at a total length of two minutes and thirty-six seconds. It featured Bollywood-style dancers and an appearance from former weather forecaster Michael Fish.

== Covers and remixes ==
The song has since been covered by many artists including Alesha Dixon. Mindless Behavior performed it live on the BBC Radio 1Xtra Breakfast Show, and Timbaland, Boy Better Know and the Kiffness made remixes sampling from the song.

== Charts ==
Chart (2012)	Peak position
Asia Download (Official Charts Company)	1
France (SNEP)	169
Ireland (IRMA)	73
Scottish Singles Sales (Official Charts)	24
UK Singles (Official Charts)	28
UK Dance (Official Charts)	4

== Release history ==
Region	Date	Format	Label
United Kingdom	7 December 2012	Download	Warner Music Group
