= Green Street House =

Former stately home in London, England

Coordinates: 51°31′53.21″N 0°2′15.96″E

Green Street House, usually known as Boleyn Castle, was a stately home in East Ham in the modern London Borough of Newham, East London.

The house lay on the eastern side of Green Street, from which it takes its name. The street forms the boundary between West and East Ham. The area on each side of Green Street, in both West and East Ham, has become known as Upton Park, after the local tube station.

The alternative name of Boleyn Castle derives from the local legend linking the house with Anne Boleyn and from its imposing appearance, notably the castle-like structure called Anne Boleyn’s Tower which lay immediately adjacent to Green Street.

West Ham United's former Boleyn Ground was built immediately to the east of the House and took its name from the alternative name for the house. In its early years the club referred to their new ground as the Boleyn Castle with Boleyn Ground subsequently becoming the usual term.

The house was demolished in 1955.

== Origin, and the Boleyn Legend ==
The estate was formed in the early 16th century, perhaps by Richard Breame (d. 1546) a servant of Henry VIII. The local legend is that Anne Boleyn lived there and Henry VIII came there to court her. There is no documentary evidence to support this belief.

== Description ==
Green Street House was a red-brick building, mostly of two storeys which originally comprised a great hall at right angles to the street with a long range at its west end and a kitchen block at the east end. South of the kitchen block was a staircase wing with a three-storeyed tower east of that. At the north end of the west range, fronting Green Street, was an arched gateway.

In the late 17th century the upper parts of the hall, the west range, the kitchen, and staircase wing were partly rebuilt. during the ownership of Sir Jacob and Sir Thomas Garrard.

In the 18th century a wing was added east of the tower, and a later addition was made east of the kitchen. Inside the house there was panelling of the late 16th- or early 17th-century, and the main staircase was of the same period.

In the garden, south of the west wing, was a detached tower, Anne Boleyn's Tower, which overlooked the street and was the best-known feature of the house. This was an octagonal building of red brick with crenellated parapet and stair-turret. It was built about the middle of the 16th century, and may originally have been balanced by another tower at the south-east corner of the garden.

The upper part of the tower was rebuilt by William Morley about 1800. Until the 18th century a room in the tower was hung with leather embossed with gold, but Morley's predecessor, Mrs. Whiteside, is said to have burnt these hangings and sold the gold. The sale catalogue of 1863 lists all the rooms in the house and its outbuildings, and describes the gardens, which contained several fine cedars.

When the Roman Catholics bought the house they demolished the gateway and erected a range of buildings, including a church, along Green Street.

== Owners and tenants ==
It has been suggested that Breame was followed in the late 16th and early 17th centuries by the Nevilles, whose monument is in St. Mary's church, East Ham. In the 1630s and 1640s the estate seems to have belonged to Sir Henry Holcroft (died circa 1651) a Parliamentarian prominent in Essex during the Civil War, and later to his widow.

It was acquired about 1653 by Sir Jacob Garrard (Bt.), a London merchant of royalist sympathies who founded an apprenticing charity. Green Street House descended with the baronetcy until the death in 1728 of Sir Nicholas Garrard. Cecilia, widow of Sir Nicholas, retained it until her death in 1753, when it passed to his grandnephew Sir Jacob Downing, Bt. In 1755 Downing conveyed the estate, then comprising about 160 acres (65 ha), to James Barnard or Bernard (d. 1759). Bernard appears to have been succeeded by Mrs. Whiteside, who was probably his daughter and the estate was partly broken up about this time.

In 1788–1789, Maurice Bernard sold Green Street House and grounds, totalling 17 acres (6.9 ha), to William Morley. Morley, a London corn merchant, lived there until his death in 1832. The house was subsequently bought by Mr. Henry Lee, for his daughter Mrs. Sarah Morley, who was related to the former owner by marriage. In 1839 James Morley (not her husband but possibly her uncle), owned and occupied the house. The occupation of the site by the different Morley families led to the junction of Green Street and Barking Road, by the Boleyn Tavern, being known as Morley's Corner.

In 1863, the house and grounds, then comprising 30 acres (12 ha), were advertised for sale. They do not appear to have changed hands then, but in 1869 they were bought from the Morleys by Cardinal Manning, for use as a Roman Catholic reformatory school. After the reformatory was closed the southern part of the site was used for a Roman Catholic church and primary school.

The house, after being used c. 1907–12 as a maternity home, was leased, with some adjoining land, to the West Ham United football club, which sub-let the house to the Boleyn Castle social club. The social club occupied the house until the Second World War.

After moving into the adjacent Boleyn Ground, West Ham United trained on the grounds of Green Street House, before moving to Chadwell Heath.

== Demolition ==
Like many stately homes at that time, the house became dilapidated, with bomb damage possibly a factor, and as a result was demolished in 1955.

== Legacy ==
Until 2016, West Ham United played at the adjacent Boleyn Ground named after the House and the club's badge featured a stylised representation of the House. The ground's West Stand, redeveloped in 2001 included tower features as a stylised tribute to the club's badge and Green Street House itself. The Boleyn Ground was demolished after the 2015–16 season but the Boleyn Tavern, on the Morley's Corner junction with Barking Road remains.

Several nearby street names reflect the presence of the House. Castle Street immediately to the south and the cluster of streets with Tudor themed names a little to the north. Other roads in the immediate north of the site are named after the other wives of King Henry VIII - Parr Road, Cleves Road, Arragon Road, Seymour Road, etc.

After West Ham United left the Boleyn Ground in 2016, archaeologists uncovered foundations of some of the buildings beneath the club's former carpark.
