= Boleyn Ground =

Former football stadium of West Ham United FC

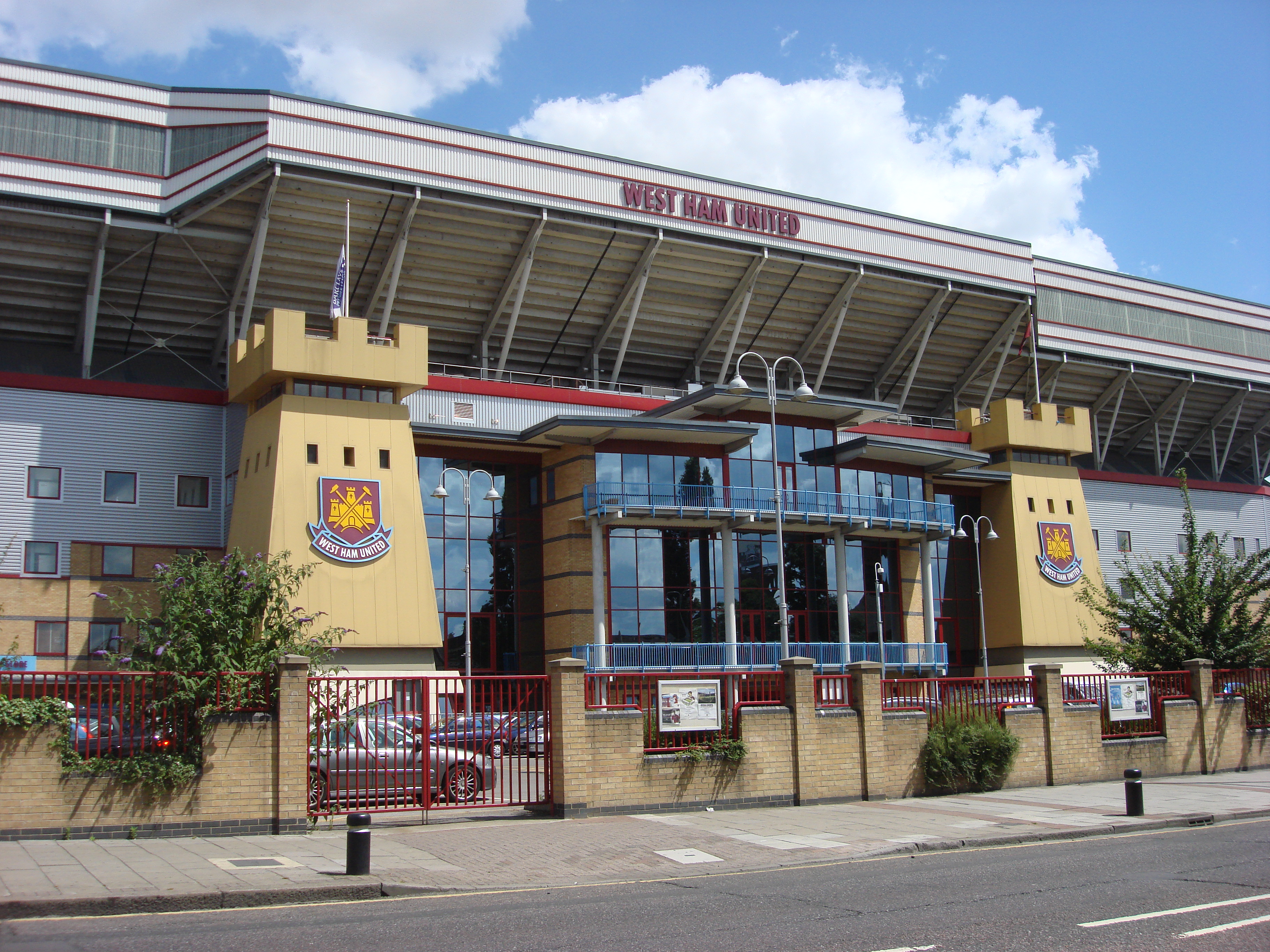
- The west stand from Green Street
- Interactive map of Boleyn Ground
- Location: Upton Park; London, E13; England
- Coordinates: 51°31′55″N 0°2′22″E
- Owner: West Ham United
- Operator: West Ham United
- Capacity: 35,016
- Surface: Grass (110 x 70 yards)
- Public transit: Upton Park

Construction
- Opened: 1904
- Closed: 10 May 2016
- Demolished: 2016–2017
- Architect: Henri Pillipe Tiite Parker

Tenants
- West Ham United (1904–2016); Charlton Athletic (1991–1992)

Website
- https://www.whufc.com/club/history/stadia/boleyn-ground

The Boleyn Ground, more often referred to as Upton Park, was a football stadium in Upton Park, East London, England. It was the home of West Ham United from 1904 to 2016, and was briefly used by Charlton Athletic in the early 1990s. The seating capacity of the ground at closure was 35,016.

From the 2016–17 season, West Ham United have played their home matches at London Stadium in nearby Stratford. The last first-class match played at the Boleyn Ground was on 10 May 2016, a 3–2 West Ham United win in the Premier League against Manchester United.

The stadium was demolished in 2016 to make way for a new development.

== History ==
West Ham United took up tenancy of the Boleyn Ground from local club Old Castle Swifts in 1904, after the two clubs amalgamated. West Ham rented Green Street House and grounds in East Ham from the Roman Catholic Church from around 1912. Green Street House was known locally as Boleyn Castle because of its imposing nature and an association with Anne Boleyn, who had either stayed at or, as some believe, owned the house. Hence the ground became known as the Boleyn Ground. However, over the years the ground was more often referred to as Upton Park, after the Upton Park, London area where it is located.

In August 1944, a V-1 flying bomb fell on the south-west corner of the pitch. This forced West Ham to play its matches at other grounds while repairs were undertaken, but it did not affect performances as West Ham managed nine consecutive victories. Upon their return to the ground in December 1944, they lost 1–0 to Tottenham Hotspur.

By 1990, West Ham were required to convert Upton Park into an all-seater stadium for the 1994–95 season in order to comply with the requirements of the Taylor Report. The first stage of the redevelopment came in 1993, when the South Bank was replaced by a 9,000 seat, two-tier stand named in honour of former captain Bobby Moore, who had died earlier that year. The stand incorporated executive boxes as well as a digital clock. The North Bank was demolished in 1994 and a new 6,000 seat, two-tier stand named the "Centenary Stand" was opened on its site the following year; this was later renamed the "Sir Trevor Brooking Stand". The East Stand Lower was also converted into an all-seater stand.

The final change came in 2000, when the West Stand was replaced by a 15,000 seat, two-tier stand named the "Dr. Martens Stand". The stand incorporated executive boxes on two levels as well as the West Ham United Hotel. This gave the stadium a 35,000 all-seater capacity.

Plans were proposed to increase the stadium's capacity to approximately 40,500 by constructing a larger East Stand, which would have utilized the space created when the Doctor Martens Stand was built further west than the former West Stand. However, these plans never came to fruition.

=== Decision to demolish ===
Through 2006, talk was rife of West Ham moving to the Olympic Stadium after the 2012 Summer Olympics, with speculation increasing after new club chairman Eggert Magnusson confirmed he was interested in a move there. However, talks broke down between the club and the Olympic Committee after it was announced the Stadium would be reduced to a 25,000 capacity all-seater after the Olympic Games, which was 10,000 less than the Boleyn Ground's capacity, and the stadium would be keeping its running track, leaving supporters further from the pitch and affecting the atmosphere within the stadium. Rumours suggested West Ham might move to a new stadium at the Parcelforce depot near to West Ham Underground/mainline station instead. Indeed, on 7 November 2007, Mayor of London Ken Livingstone announced a new site had been identified for West Ham's new stadium.

However, in 2009, club CEO Scott Duxbury announced West Ham had obtained planning permission to expand the East Stand; this would have brought the stadium's capacity over 40,000.

Then, in 2010, new club owners David Gold and David Sullivan announced West Ham would move to the Olympic Stadium after the 2012 Olympics after all. On 23 March 2010, the club announced it was working on a joint bid with Newham London Borough Council to move into the Olympic Stadium. On 30 September 2010, the club formally submitted its bid for the Olympic Stadium with a presentation at 10 Downing Street, and the world's largest live entertainment company Live Nation endorsed the club's Olympic Stadium plans on 8 October 2010. Three days after Live Nation's endorsement UK Athletics confirmed its formal support for West Ham United and Newham Council in their joint bid to take over the Olympic Stadium in legacy mode. In November 2010, West Ham commenced a search for potential developers for "informal discussions" about what would happen to the ground if it did take over the Olympic Stadium after the 2012 Games.

On 11 February 2011, the Olympic Park Legacy Committee selected West Ham as the preferred club to move into the Olympic Stadium after the 2012 Games. The decision, in favour of West Ham's bid, was unanimous. On 3 March 2011, West Ham United's proposed move to the Olympic Stadium was approved by the British government and London mayor Boris Johnson; but due to ongoing legal challenges to the arrangement by Tottenham Hotspur and Leyton Orient, the deal to sell the Olympic Stadium to West Ham collapsed on 11 October 2011, West Ham announced plans to become tenants of the stadium and on 22 March 2013 after months of voting and negotiations, West Ham won the Olympic Stadium bidding. West Ham were offered a 99-year lease and hoped to move there in time for the 2016–17 season.

In February 2014, West Ham announced the sale of the Boleyn Ground to the development company the Galliard Group, to be effected once the move to the Olympic Stadium was complete.

=== The final game ===
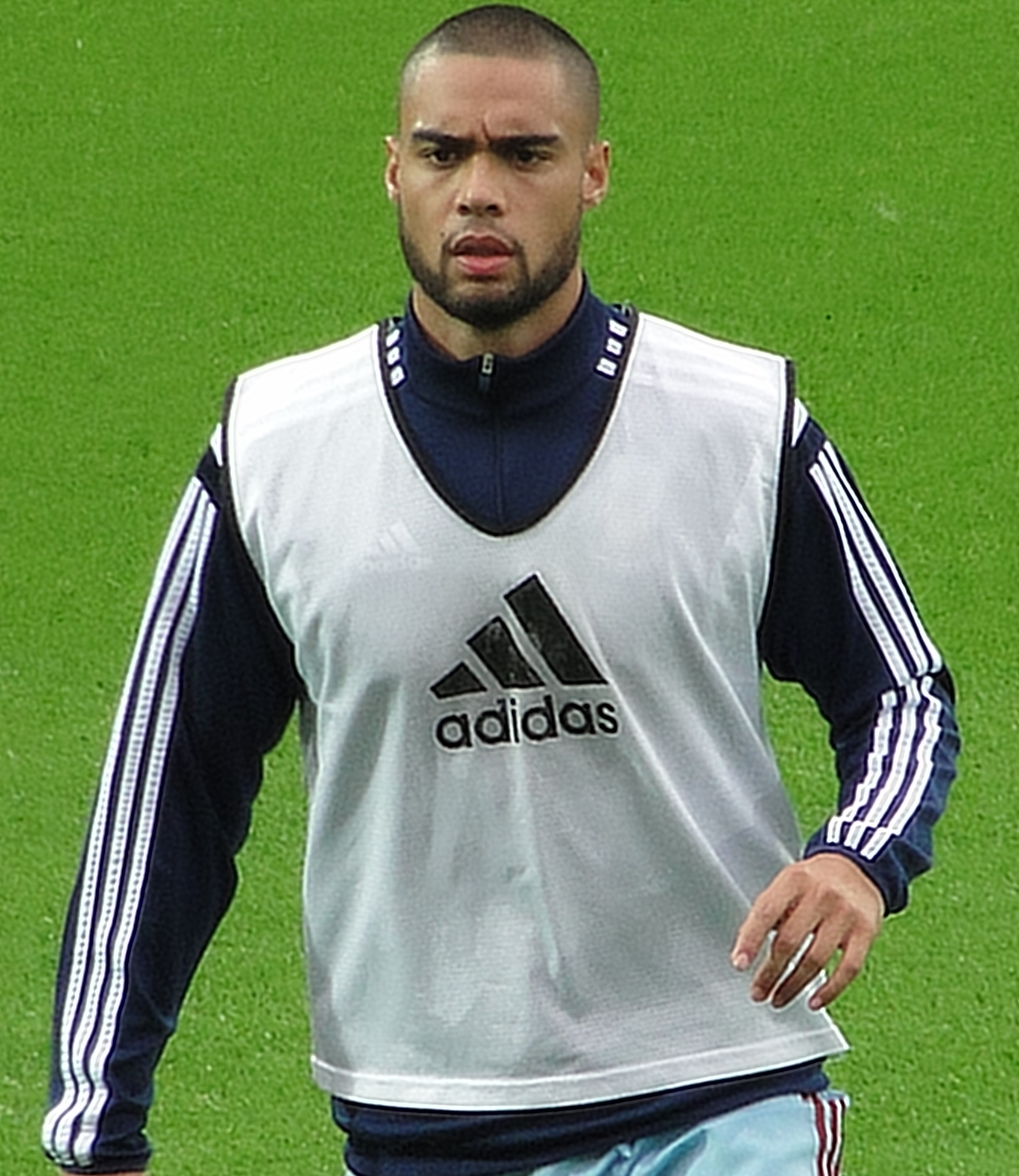
Winston Reid, scorer of the last goal at the Boleyn Ground

When the Premier League fixtures were drawn-up at the start of the 2015–16 Premier League season, Swansea City were planned to be West Ham's final opponents at the Boleyn Ground, on 7 May 2016. However, due to Manchester United's involvement in the FA Cup on 23 April when they were due to play West Ham, the fixture was rearranged to 10 May 2016. The match was preceded by violence on Green Street when the coach carrying the players and staff of Manchester United was pelted with missiles resulting in broken windows. With the coach delayed, the players were late arriving at the ground and the scheduled 19:45 kick-off was moved to 20:15.

In the 2,398th match played at the ground, with both sides looking to qualify for European football in the 2016–17 season, in front of a crowd of 34,907, West Ham took the lead in the tenth minute through Diafra Sakho, only for Manchester United to make the score 1–2 with two goals from Anthony Martial. However, Michail Antonio equalised for West Ham and Winston Reid scored a third in the 80th minute to make it 3–2, the final score. It was West Ham's 384th Premier League match, their 990th in the top division, and their 1,662nd ever league match at the ground, the win signifying 601 home Premier League points won there. Mark Noble was named Man of the Match. The match was followed by a 45-minute display on the pitch in celebration of the history of the ground. The following day, the club condemned the violence aimed at the Manchester United coach, vowing to ban for life any person convicted. Three people were arrested on the night of the game, two for pitch incursion and one for throwing a bottle at the police. The following day, the Metropolitan Police issued pictures of four men they hoped to identify in connection with the coach attack.

=== Closure, demolition and redevelopment ===
The sale of the Ground was completed on 15 July 2016, at a price of £40,000,000. The developer's plans include 838 new homes, retail outlets and leisure facilities which will be available by 2018. The possibility of a statue of Bobby Moore and a landscaped garden named after him has also been revealed. The plans caused controversy for only including 51 "affordable" homes and no social housing. In March 2016, plans were approved for 800 homes to be built on the site, 25% of which would be affordable housing.

On 14 March 2016, the dismantling of the ground began with the removal of the John Lyall gates for transfer and reinstallation at the Olympic Stadium. By July, the seats had been removed from the ground and it was handed over to developers for demolition and redevelopment; the formal transfer of ownership of the site to Barratt London was completed a month later. In September, the ground was used for the film Final Score and hosted a charity match on 27 September shortly before demolition commenced. 1,000 of 1,400 commemorative bricks were saved by Jonjo Heuerman when the wall they were in was taken down, and are available to be claimed by the fans who paid for them. The inscriptions were later reproduced in a pathway at the new ground.

== The stands ==
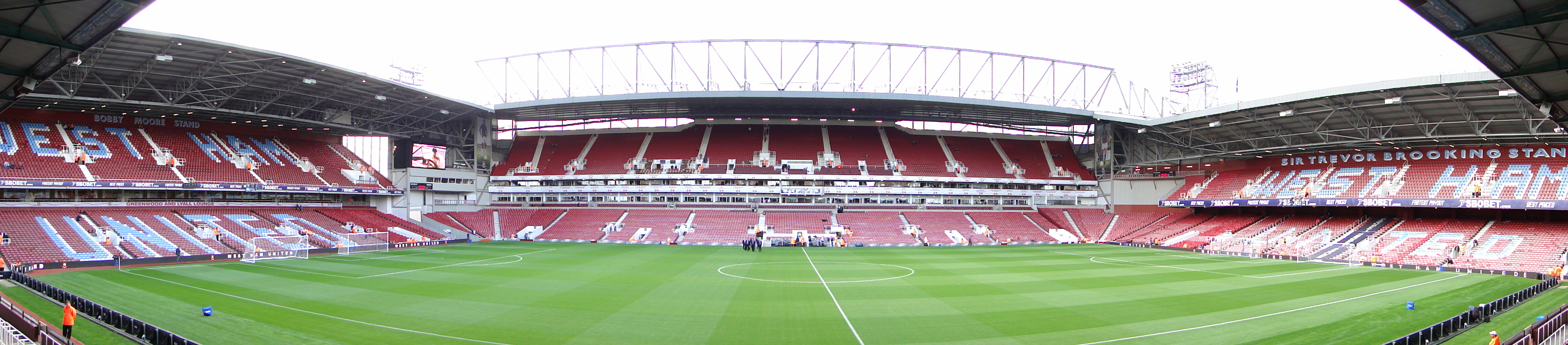
A panorama of the Boleyn Ground from the East Stand

The record attendance at the ground was 42,322, against Tottenham in an old Division One match on 17 October 1970, when the North and South Banks were terraced, as was the old "Chicken Run" at the front of the East Stand.

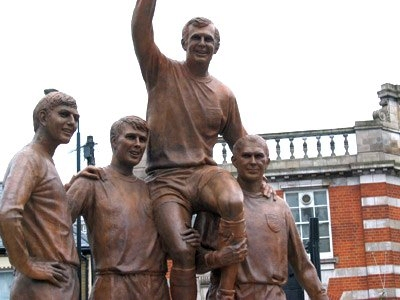
Champions Statue on Barking Road. Left to right: Martin Peters (1943–2019), Geoff Hurst, Bobby Moore (1941–1993; aloft), Ray Wilson (1934–2018).

The Boleyn Ground became an all-seater stadium from the early 1990s because clubs had to meet new FA regulations for stadium safety after the Hillsborough Disaster in 1989. The record attendance after Upton Park became an all-seater was 35,550, on 21 September 2002 for a Premier League match against Manchester City. Before its closure, the ground had a total capacity of 35,016, all seated.

Upton Park had four main stands, the Sir Trevor Brooking Stand, Bobby Moore Stand, East Stand and Betway Stand.

=== Sir Trevor Brooking Stand ===
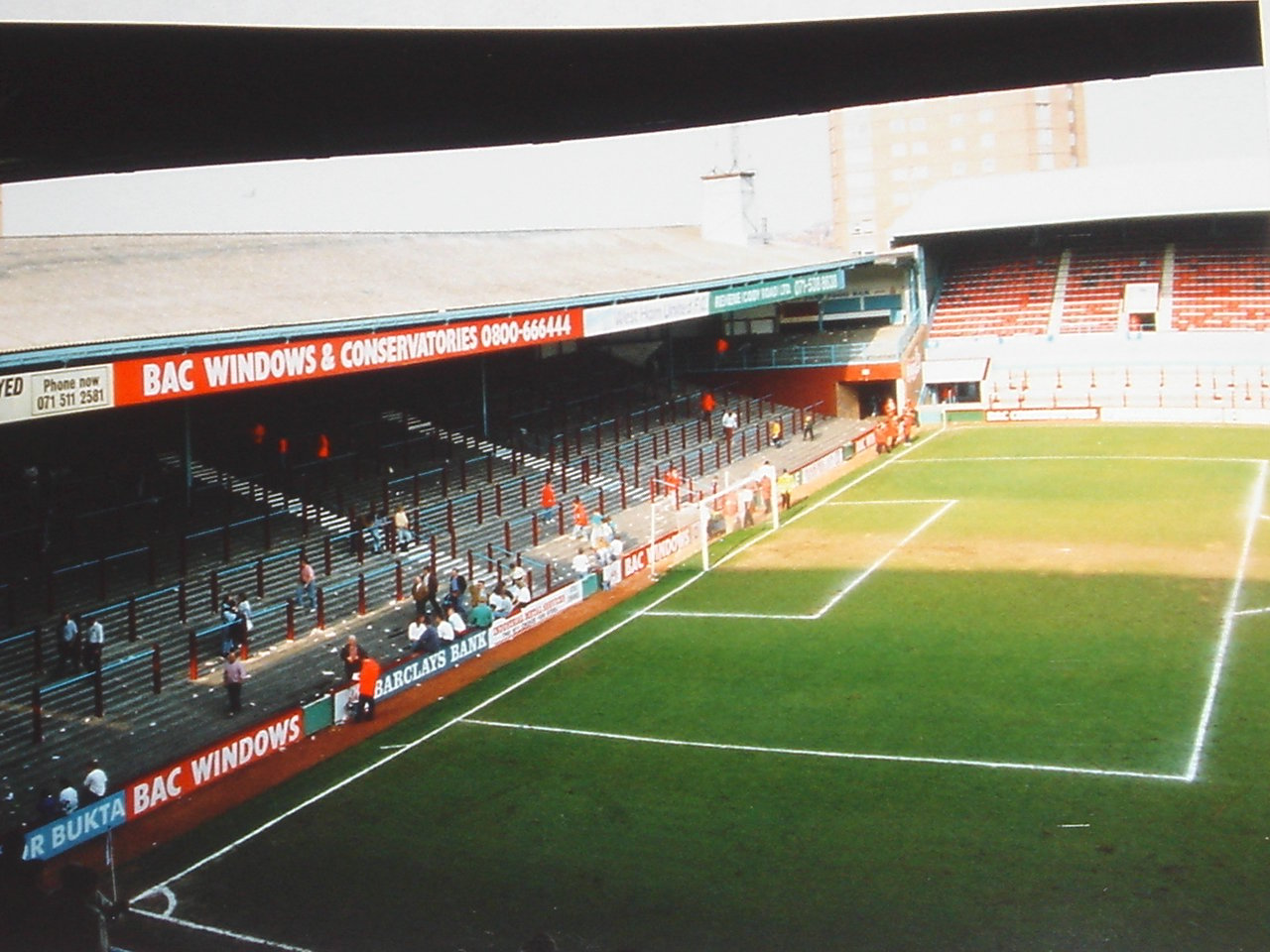
The North Bank, 1991, before redevelopment.

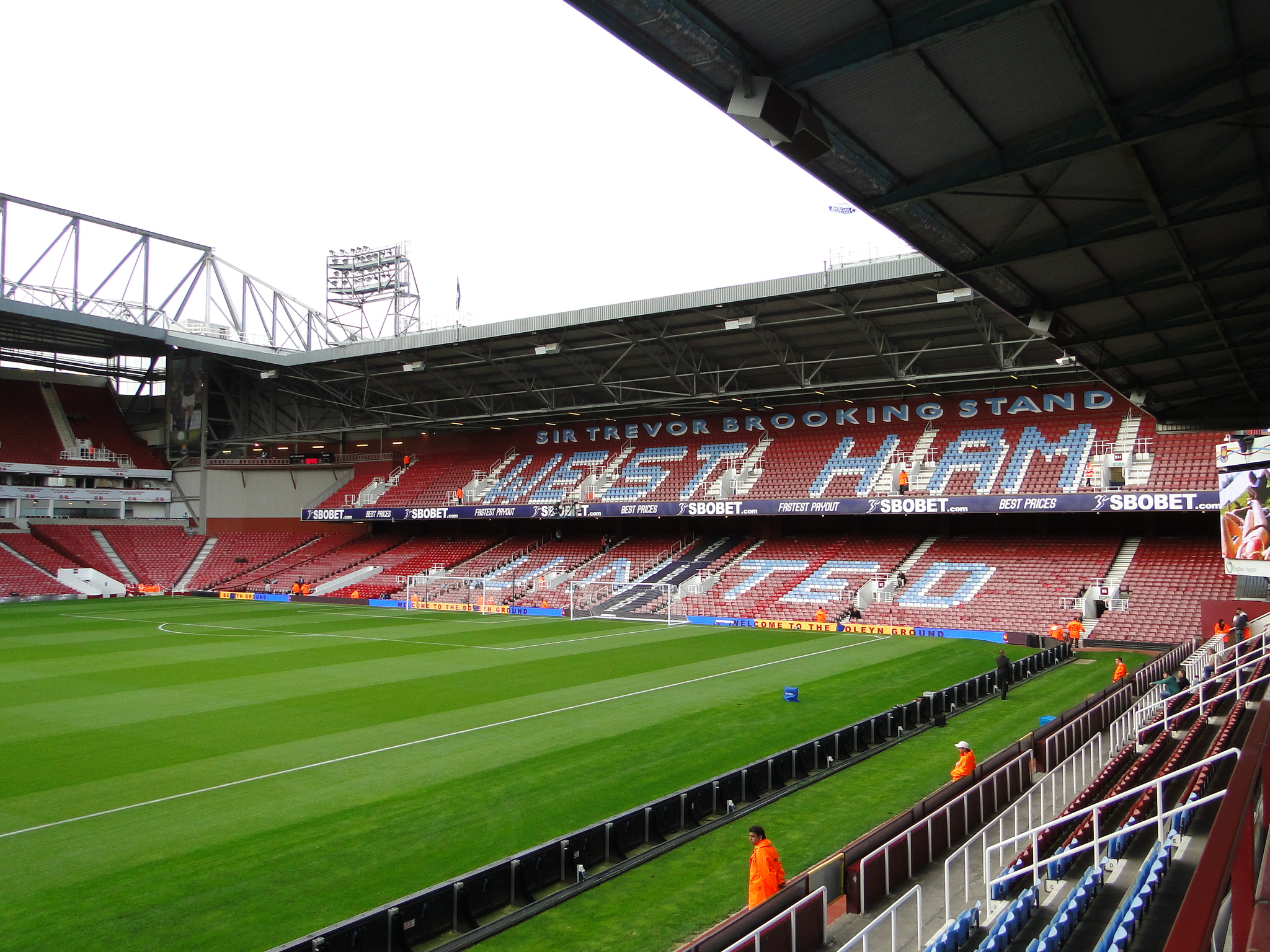
The Sir Trevor Brooking Stand.

The Sir Trevor Brooking Stand (formerly the North Bank then the Centenary Stand) was built in 1995 which coincided with the club's 100th season, after being formed in 1895 as Thames Ironworks. Its name was changed from the Centenary Stand to the Sir Trevor Brooking Stand in July 2009. The stand held around 6,000 seats, and had two tiers, with the upper-tier seating known as the family section, as supporters could only purchase tickets there if with a child. The lower tier behind the goal was split between home and away fans. West Ham initially gave around 2,500–3,000 tickets to away supporters, going from the furthest side to the left of the bottom tier right up to behind the goal.

If the away side could not sell all their tickets, they were returned and re-sold to home supporters, as there was big demand from West Ham fans to purchase seats in the lower seating area. Home fans in the lower area generally preferred to stand during games and sing throughout. It was known as one of the more atmospheric sections of the stadium, especially with the two sets of supporters next to each other (separated by stewards and police). There was also one of two large LED video screens situated in the corner between the Sir Trevor Brooking Stand Stand and the East Stand.

=== East Stand ===
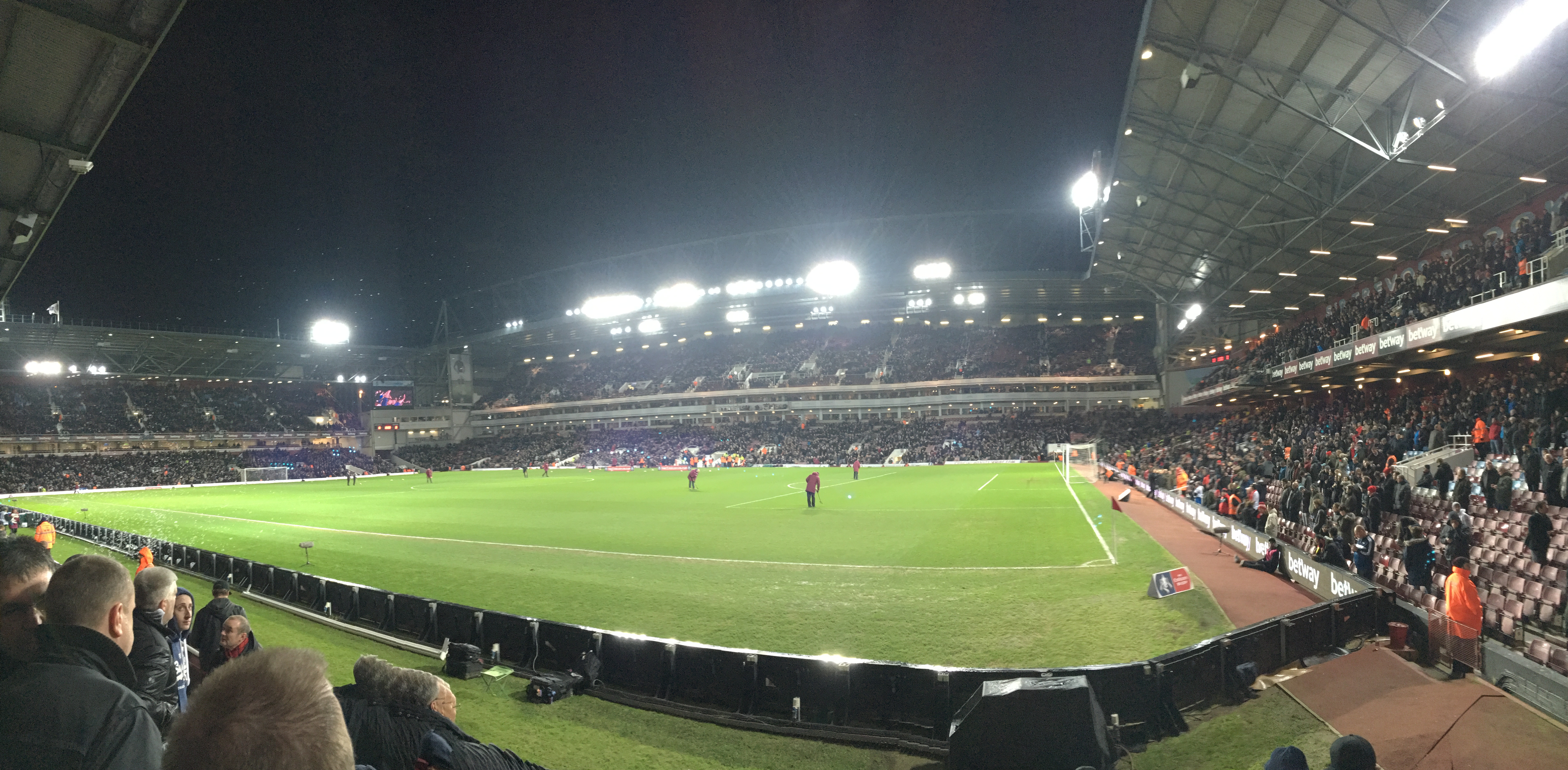
Boleyn Ground view from the East Stand before kick-off in the FA Cup against Liverpool, one of the last night games to be played at the venue.

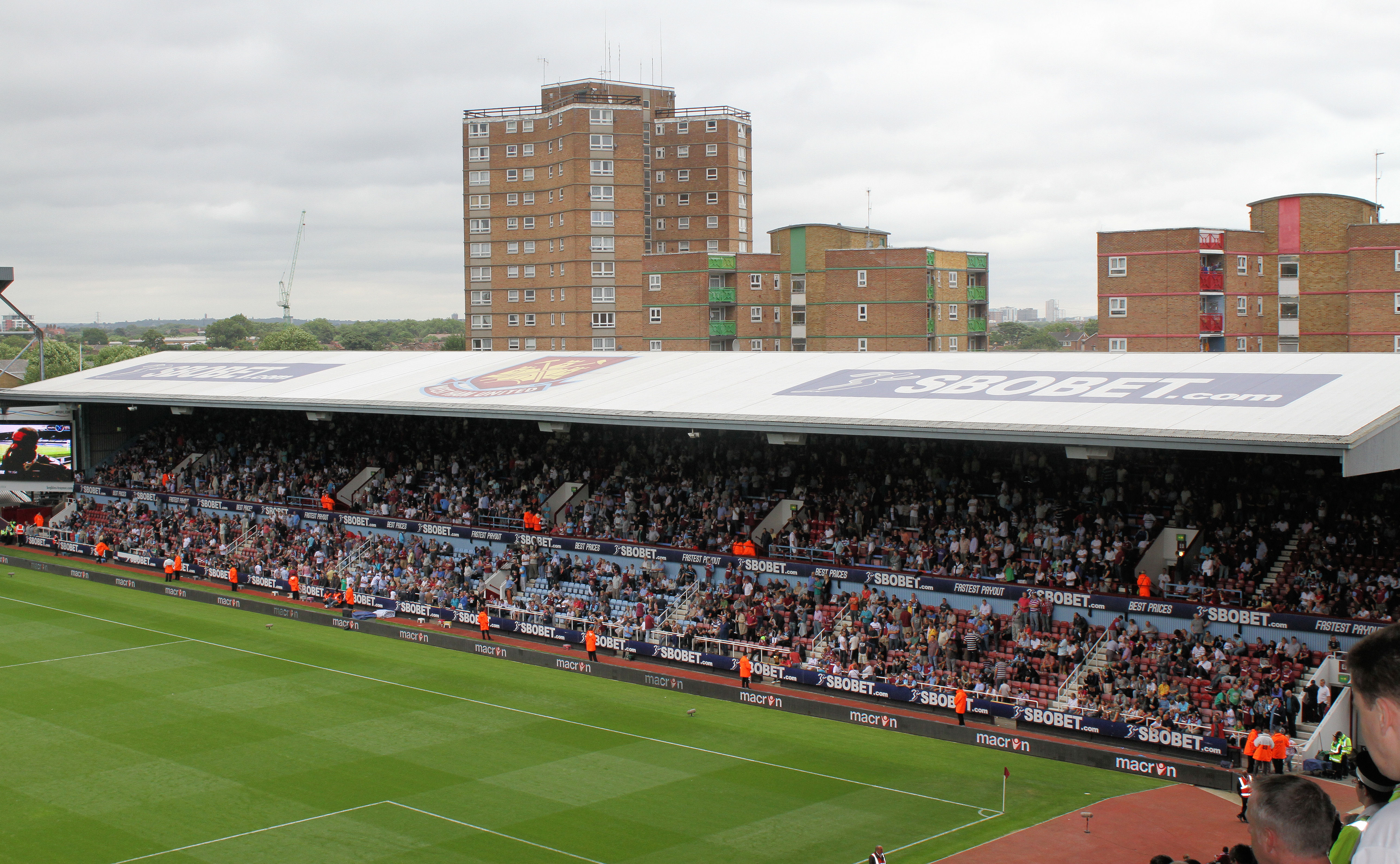
The East Stand

The East Stand was situated on the far side of the Boleyn Ground, opposite the West Stand which housed the offices and dressing rooms. The stand was the oldest and smallest stand in the stadium, being built in 1969 and held only 5,000 seats due to its narrow width. The stand, which housed the standing season ticket holders, was known as the loudest and most intimidating stand at Upton Park. The stand was known as the 'Chicken Run', a name that had originally been applied to an earlier stand. This was an old wooden stand (standing room only) on the east side of the pitch. Unusually, the roof sloped down away from the pitch and it was surrounded by a similar sort of wire to that used on chicken runs, so when viewed from the opposite side of the ground it looked like a chicken run. The front of the stand was very close to the pitch. It was knocked down and rebuilt in 1969.

The stand at one point had the words "DAGENHAM MOTORS" written into the bottom tier through the seats, but was only changed during the 2006–07 season, despite the club splitting from their sponsorship with the car company back in 1997. The stand was also the only stand left at Upton Park to still have a small minority of wooden seats (at the time of demolition), in the middle of the upper tier. There were also plans to build a new East Stand soon after the Dr. Martens stand was completed in 2001, which would have seen the stadium's capacity rise from 35,345 to around 40,500, but the plans were put on hold after a combination of resistance from the local residents behind the stand and the club's relegation from the Premier League in 2003, which spiralled the club into debt at the time.

=== Bobby Moore Stand ===
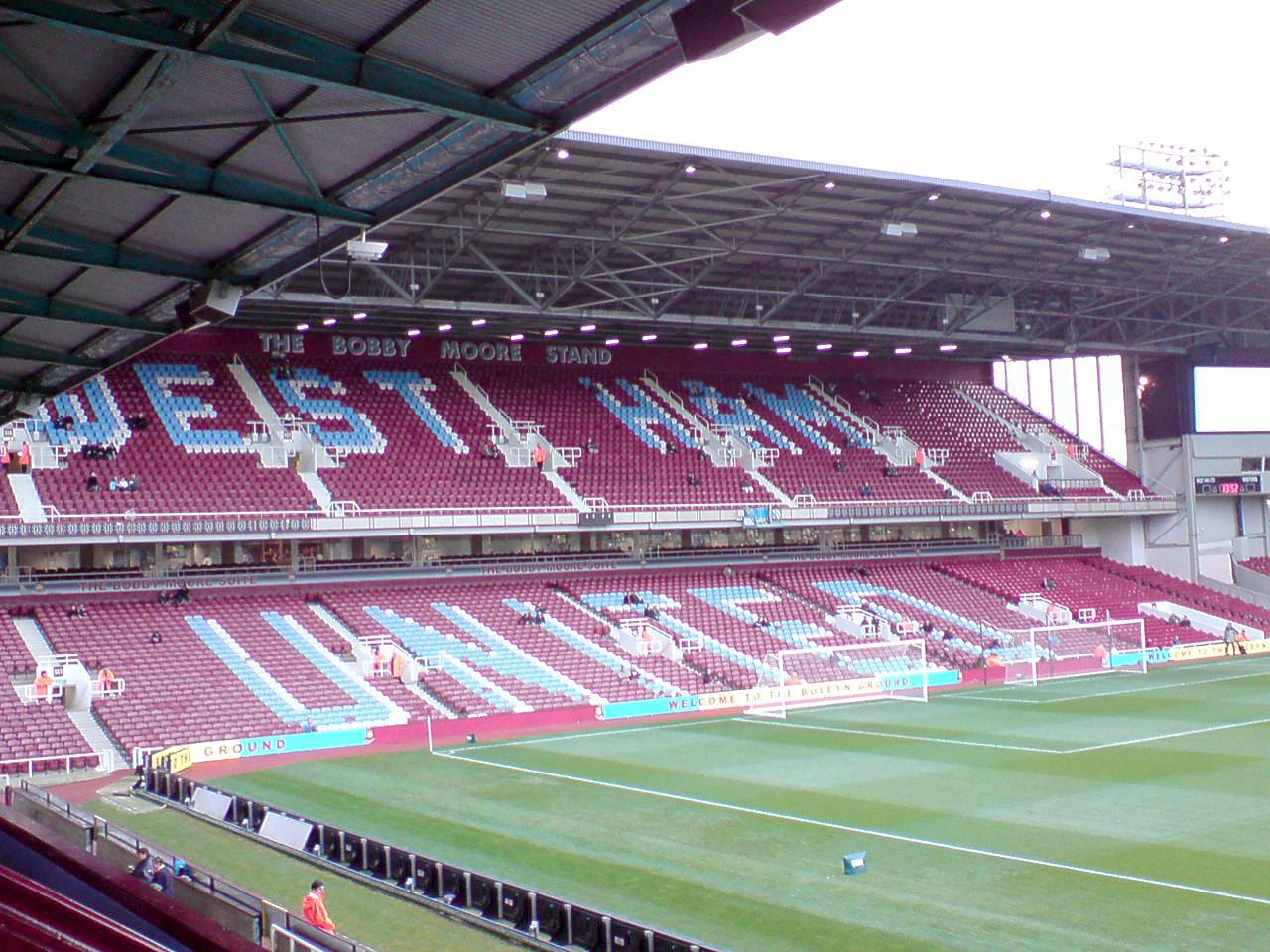
The Bobby Moore Stand

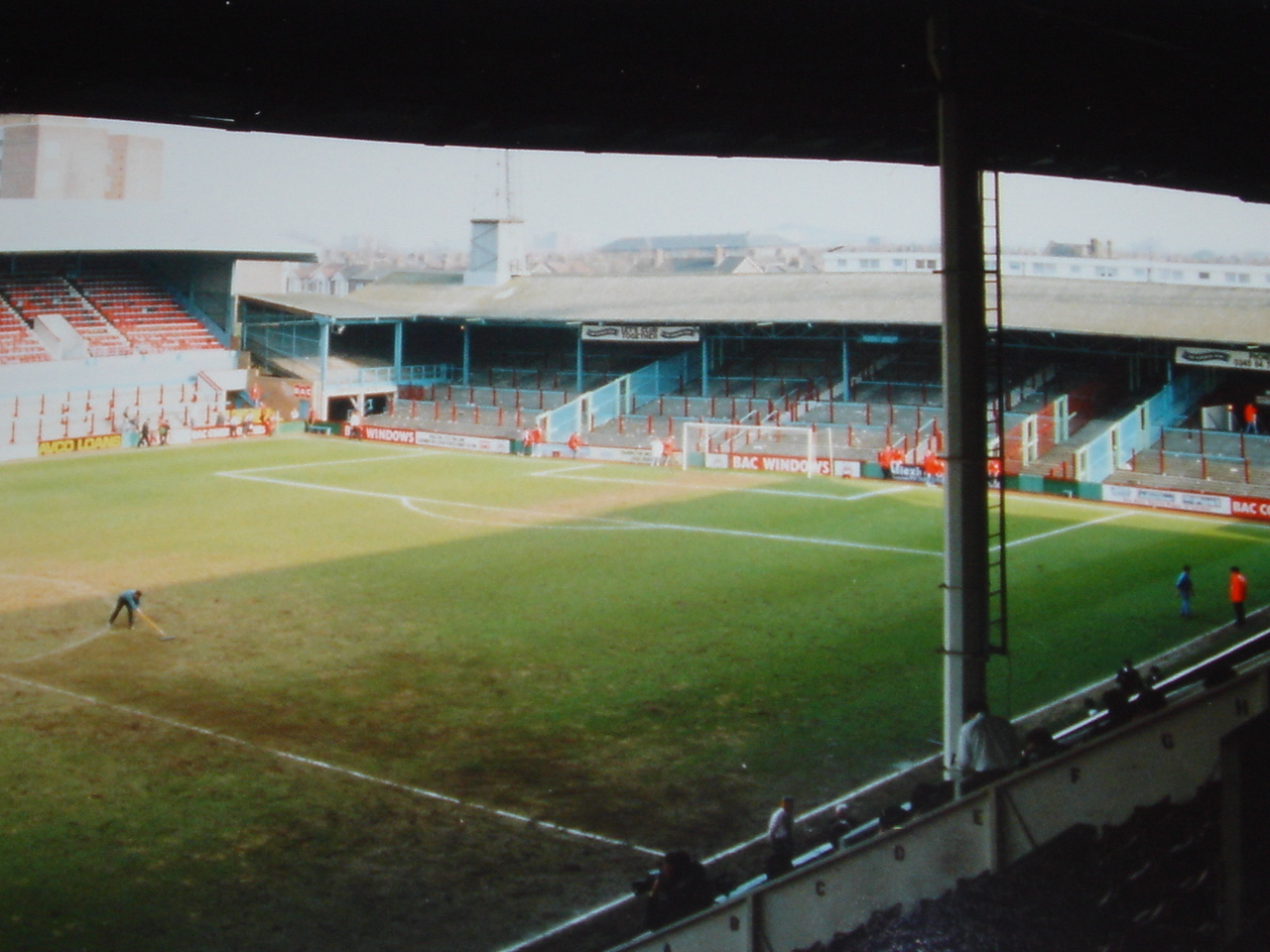
The South Bank, Boleyn Ground, 1991, before redevelopment

The Bobby Moore Stand (formerly the South Bank) was built in 1993 and held up to 9,000 spectators, all seated. The stand was built originally to comply with new stadium all-seater regulations, and the name of the stand was decided after the death of the club's legendary captain from the successful mid-1960s side in the same year of construction. The stand had two tiers, and spelt the words "WEST HAM UNITED" through the seats of both tiers. The lower tier of the Bobby Moore stand, like the Sir Trevor Brooking Stand, was well known for its supporters' passion and the atmosphere created through standing and singing. The stand had executive boxes situated between the upper and lower tiers, and a digital clock. The stand was renovated in 2001 after the construction of the new Dr. Martens Stands, with a second LED video screen in the stadium being introduced between the two stands and new seats added on the end of the stand to join with the new Dr. Martens Stand.

=== The West Stand ===
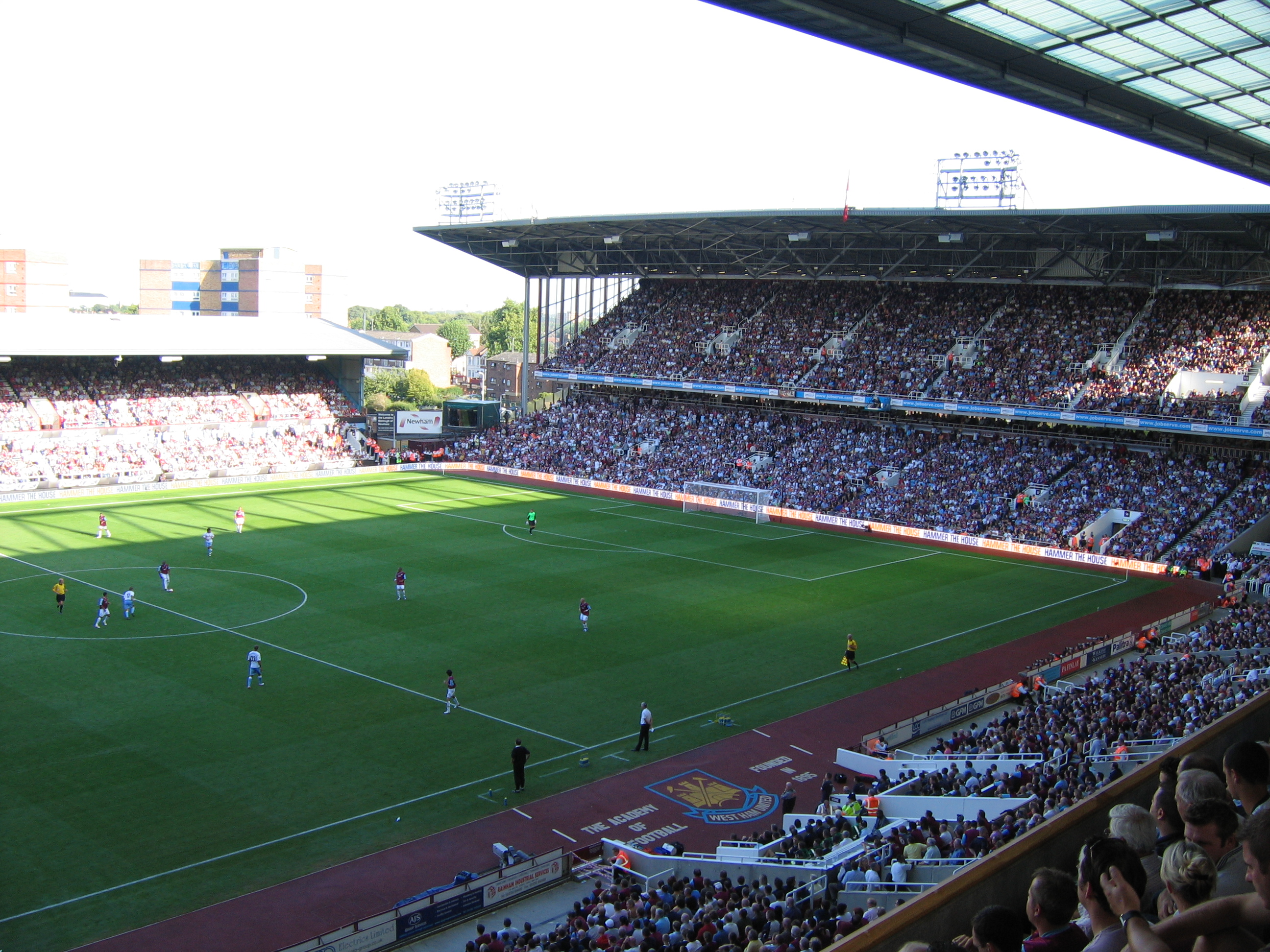
View from the West Stand

The West Stand was the newest and by far the largest stand inside Upton Park, holding up to 15,000 spectators and was renamed after Betway became West Ham's official sponsors. The stand was built in 2001 as the Dr. Martens Stand, bringing the stadium capacity up from around 26,000 to 35,647. The West Stand was the main stand in Upton Park, as it included two tiers for paying home supporters, separated by two tiers of executive boxes. The stand also hosted all the club's offices, board rooms, suites, dressing rooms, official shop, and the West Ham United Hotel. It was the largest single football stand in London.

The stand's main feature was seen from the exterior of the stadium, with two large turrets built onto the stand with the club badge embedded on both, going with the theme of the club's badge. The terrace also had two scoreboards at both corners joining with the Centenary and Bobby Moore Stands, displaying the score and time of the game in process. The stand was so large, it was visible from the A406 North Circular Road and from the A13 Newham Way, where people could clearly make out the roof of the stand over the tower blocks. The stand was officially opened by HM The Queen, where Her Majesty was introduced to the manager and captain at the time, Glenn Roeder and Joe Cole.

In 2009, following the end of Dr. Martens sponsorship, the stand resumed the old name of the West Stand.

In 2011, the club signed a three-year agreement for the stand to be named "The Alpari Stand".

== Other events ==
In June 1989, evangelist Billy Graham hosted a three-day Christian mission to London to which free tickets were given away. He gave away more tickets than seats, not expecting them all to be used. In the event they were used and many were locked out. After negotiations between the club and Graham's representatives, the crowd were allowed to use the pitch.

On 12 February 2003, England played Australia at the Boleyn Ground in an international friendly, with Australia winning 3–1. The match is best known for marking Wayne Rooney's international debut.

On 9 May 2012, the Boleyn Ground was confirmed as the venue for the fight between David Haye and Derek Chisora, a fight sanctioned by the Luxembourg Boxing Federation on 14 July 2012. The fight caused controversy at the time as neither fighter held a license from the British Boxing Board of Control.

On 12 November 2014, a friendly game between Argentina and Croatia was played at the Boleyn Ground. The match finished 2–1 to Argentina and saw the return of former West Ham striker Carlos Tevez to the Boleyn Ground.

The stadium is the setting of the 2018 film Final Score. An ex-soldier, played by Dave Bautista, is forced into action to defend the packed stadium when armed Russian terrorists take control of it.

=== International matches ===
7 April 1982 Quarter Final	England U21	2–2	Poland U21	London
	Hateley 6' 20'	Report	Biernat 62' Baran 74'	Stadium: Boleyn Ground; Attendance: 6,680

9 October 1998 Qualifier	England U21	1–0	Bulgaria U21	London
	Lampard 62' (pen.)	Report		Stadium: Boleyn Ground; Attendance: 11,577; Referee: Dick van Egmond

6 October 1999 Qualifier	England U18	0–2	Spain U18	London
		Report	Trashorras 41' 69'	Stadium: Boleyn Ground; Attendance: 7,710

12 December 2002 Friendly	England U20	0–2	Switzerland U20	London
		Report	Weber 44'; Mikari 88'	Stadium: Boleyn Ground; Attendance: 11,000

12 February 2003 Friendly	England	1–3	Australia	London
20:15 GMT	Jeffers 69'	Report	Popovic 17'; Kewell 41'; Emerton 83'	Stadium: Boleyn Ground; Attendance: 34,590; Referee: Manuel Mejuto González

19 August 2003 Friendly	England U21	0–3	Croatia U21	London
	Pennant (red card) 61'	Report	Ljubojević 12' 54'; Pranjić 90'	Stadium: Boleyn Ground; Attendance: 11,008; Referee: Tommy Skjerven

10 August 2010 Friendly	Italy	0–1	Ivory Coast	London
19:45 BST (UTC+01:00)		Report	K. Touré 55'	Stadium: Boleyn Ground; Attendance: 11,000; Referee: Martin Atkinson

12 November 2014 Friendly	Argentina	2–1	Croatia	London
19:45 GMT	Ansaldi 49'; Messi 57' (pen.)	Report	Sharbini 11'	Stadium: Boleyn Ground; Attendance: 19,834; Referee: Andre Marriner
