= Seabrooke =

Seabrooke is a surname. Notable people with the surname include:

- Elliott Seabrooke (1886–1950), English painter
- Georgette Seabrooke (1916–2011), American painter
- Glen Seabrooke (born 1967), Canadian ice hockey player
