= Plaistow railway works =

Coordinates: 51.5317°N 0.0157°E

Plaistow railway works were built adjacent to Plaistow railway station on the north side of the line to the west of the station in 1879 to 1880. A separate engine shed was opened in 1899 adjoining the western end of the works. The locomotive works closed in 1925, with responsibility being transferred to Bow railway works which were a short distance away. Carriage and wagon work lasted until 1932 when that work was transferred to Wolverton railway works.

On 30 September 1911 a new depot—initially called "West Ham"—opened on the south side of the line and this became a Midland Railway depot in 1912 when the Midland Railway took over the London Tilbury and Southend Railway (LTSR) and then a London, Midland and Scottish Railway (LMS) shed in 1923 following the grouping, when it was allocated the 13a depot code. Following nationalization in 1948 the depot was initially part of British Railways London Midland Region, although on 20 February 1949 it transferred to the Eastern Region. The depot code was changed to 33A which it retained until November 1959. From then until closure in 1962 it was a sub-shed of Tilbury (33B), then closed following electrification of the LTSR system.

In 1950 Plaistow had an allocation of 83 locomotives, the majority (70) of which were tank engines for passenger traffic to and from Fenchurch Street with 6 freight engines and 7 shunting engines making up the balance.
