= Green Street, Newham =

Road in Newham, East London

Coordinates: 51°32′07″N 0°02′04″E

Green Street is a road in the London Borough of Newham, East London, which forms much of the boundary between East and West Ham.

Green Street is best known for the former Boleyn Ground, home to West Ham United from 1904 to 2016, and for its wide range of shops and market outlets. It was also the site of Green Street House - also known as Boleyn Castle - for more than 400 years until demolished in 1955. Green Street House was located between the street and the Boleyn Ground.

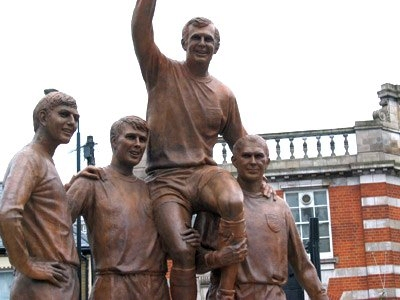
Champions Statue on the Morley's Corner junction with Barking Road.

Green Street runs from the originally Roman Romford Road, in the north, to the Barking Road in the south. The junction with Barking Road, by the Boleyn Tavern, was known as Morley's Corner after the onetime owners of Green Street House. Morley's Corner is the site of the Champions statue commemorating West Ham's players who helped win the 1966 World Cup: Bobby Moore, Geoff Hurst, Ray Wilson, and Martin Peters.

== Origins and context ==
The first surviving record of the street is from the 15th century, but it is significantly older. The street was chosen as the boundary of East and West Ham when the Manor of Ham was subdivided, sometime in the 10th or 11th centuries, so pre-dates that partition. Many south Essex field patterns and associated roads date from the late Iron Age and early Roman period and the same may apply to Green Street.

On partition, Green Street came to form the most significant part of the boundary between East and West Ham, with the boundary also extending to the north through a part of what was then Epping Forest and it also extended south through the marshes to the Thames. Romford Road was long the southern limit of Epping Forest. with a part called Hamfrith Wood lying just north of the junction with Green Street until 1700. The area south of Barking Road was largely part of the wide floodplain of the Thames. The area urbanised in the 19th century. The north part of Green Street borders the Forest Gate area of West Ham; while southern Green Street is part of the Upton Park district which also includes parts of East and West Ham.

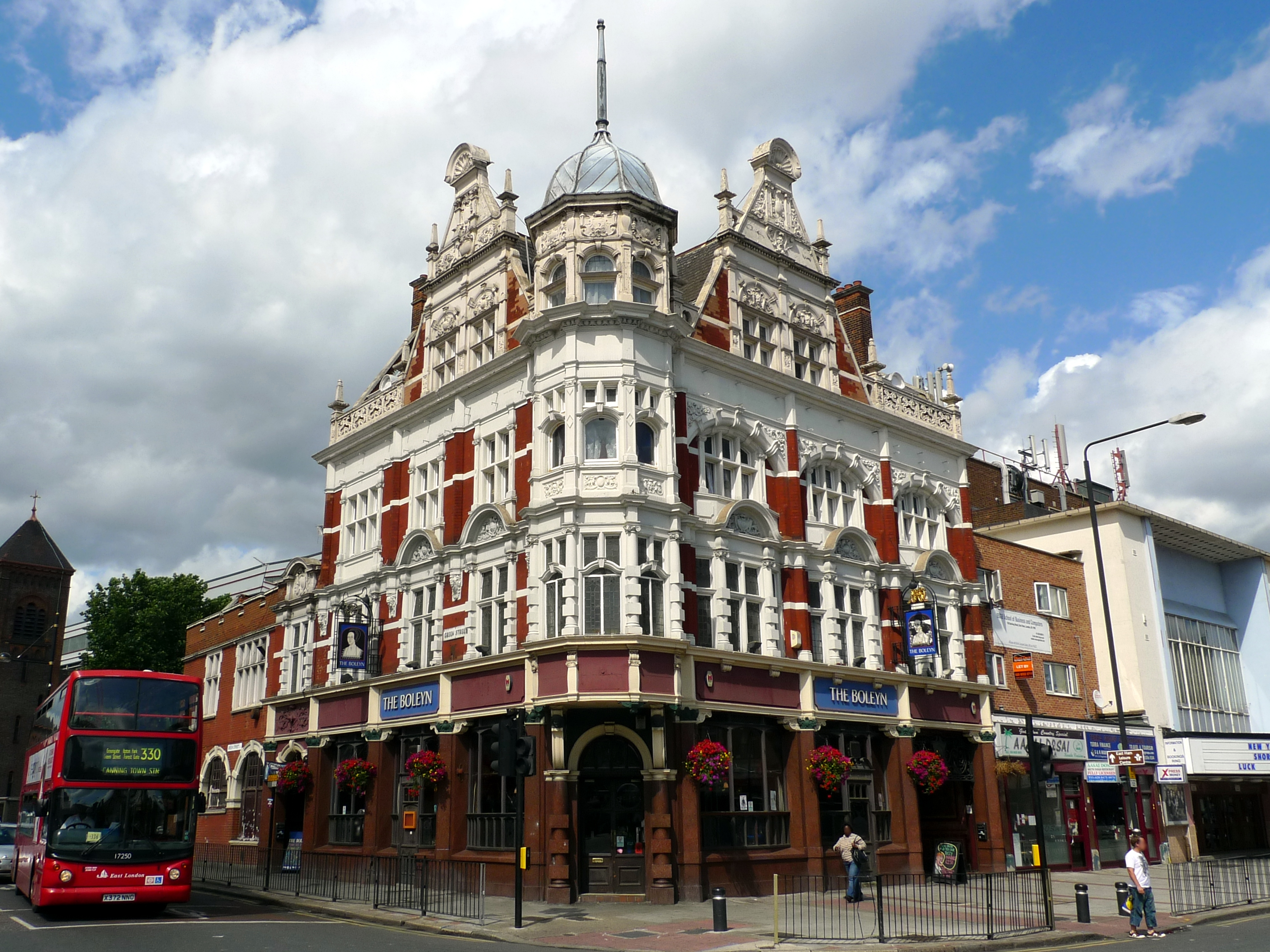
The Boleyn Tavern on the corner of Green St and Barking Road

The northern part, near the Romford Road was at one time also known as Gypsy Lane as it was used by gypsies until the area urbanised in the 19th century. The southern extension, which originally terminated in the marshes to the south, was known as Blind Lane, but renamed to Boundary Road and Boundary Lane as there was another Blind Lane in the area, and to reflect it position on the parish and borough boundary between East and West Ham.

== Anne Boleyn and Mahatma Gandhi ==
The local tradition is that Anne Boleyn, second wife of Henry VIII, lived at Green Street House and that the King would visit to court her. There isn't any documentary evidence to support this, and there are grounds to believe it to be mistaken.

In 1931 Gandhi visited London for a period of 3 months for talks on the future of India, he based himself at Kingsley Hall in Bromley-by-Bow and was enthusiastically received by East Enders. It is said that he attended several West Ham games during his stay and visited the Boleyn Tavern where he drank cream soda while discussing football and radical politics with local people.

Gandhi was a keen football fan, establishing three teams in South Africa, and already had a strong connection to West Ham United through his friendship with its founder, Arnold Hills, while living in London completing his law studies in 1888–91. During this period Hills brought the young Gandhi onto the executive committee of the London Vegetarian Society. During his 1931 stay in London, Gandhi would take long early morning walks, and he often used the nearby Sewerbank (or Greenway) between Stratford and Plaistow. Gandhi also met Charlie Chaplin in nearby Canning Town.

== Shopping and Fashion ==
Near Upton Park Underground station, the road becomes a regional centre for retail in food, jewellery and fabrics, and the location of Queens Market. The road has an array of shops specialising in primarily South Asian goods, catering to those with strong cultural and familiar ties to Bangladesh, India and Pakistan. The street also has a smaller yet prominent Afro-Caribbean community culture, reflected in its several food stores specialising in Caribbean and African foods.

In the 21st century, Green Street has become well known for its diversity in fashion. This diversity grew after London Mayor, Ken Livingstone expressed that 'the Asian presence within the London's creative industries is a huge asset'. An article written by journalist Larry Ferguson in 2003 encapsulated this and focused on the Fashion designer, Bubs Mahil who ran and continues to run the famous saree house Chiffons London in Green Street, Forest Gate, and has made costumes for Bollywood diva Aishwarya Rai as well as British Prime Minister Tony Blair — who wore her Nehru jacket in India — and his wife, Cherie. In the early 1990s and 21st century she also made headlines for dressing other notable people including Prince Buthalezi, Richard Branson, Mark Ramprakash, Britt Ekland, Parminder Nagra, Gurinder Chadha, Meera Syal, Myleene Klass and Joss Stone.

== Demographics ==
The Green Street area is split between three electoral wards, Green Street East, Green Street West and Boleyn; between them, they have a population of 46,980. The Census data for these three wards showed this part of central Newham to be among the most culturally diverse in the UK. In the 1990s, a large amount of Asians moved into the area which gave it the nickname Little India with its bustling Asian stores.

== Governance ==
The Green Street area is part of the Green Street East and Green Street West wards for elections to Newham London Borough Council.

== In popular culture ==
The film Green Street and its sequels were named after the street and focussed on a fictional group of football hooligans.

== See also ==
- Brick Lane (Banglatown)
- Little Bangladesh
