= Queen's Market =

Market in the London Borough of Newham

Coordinates: 51°32′07″N 0°02′04″E

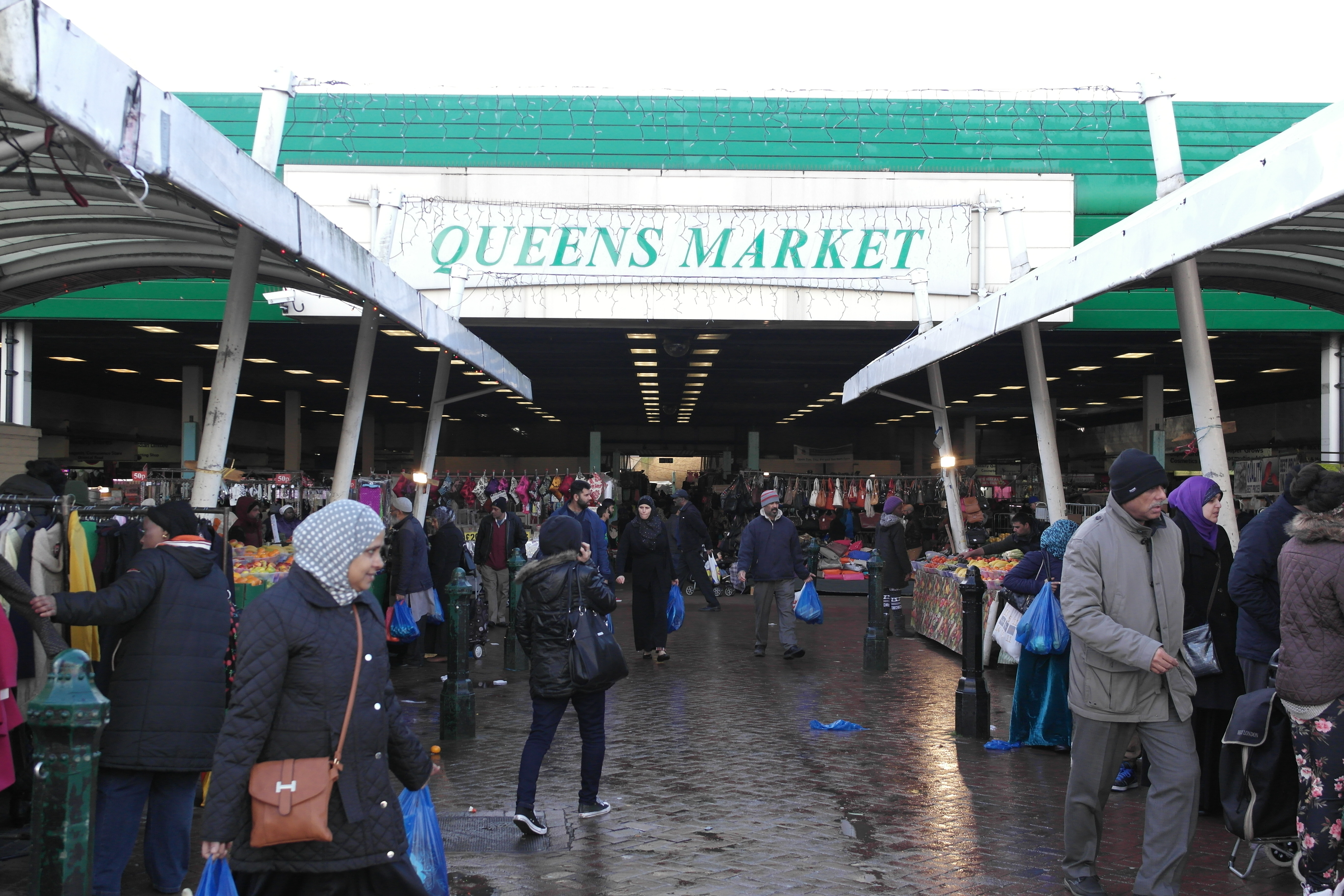
Queen's Market Upton Park

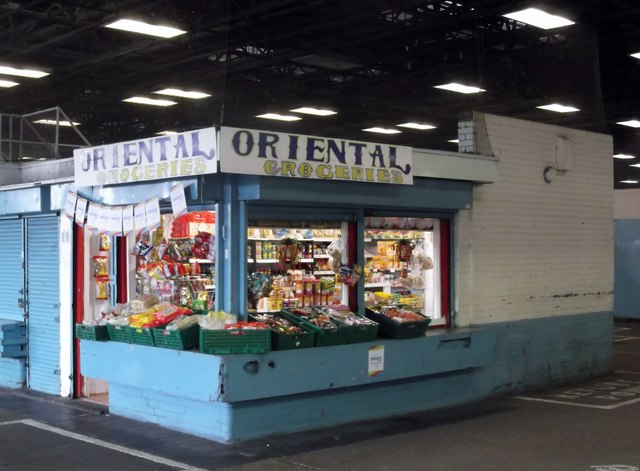
A stall in the covered market

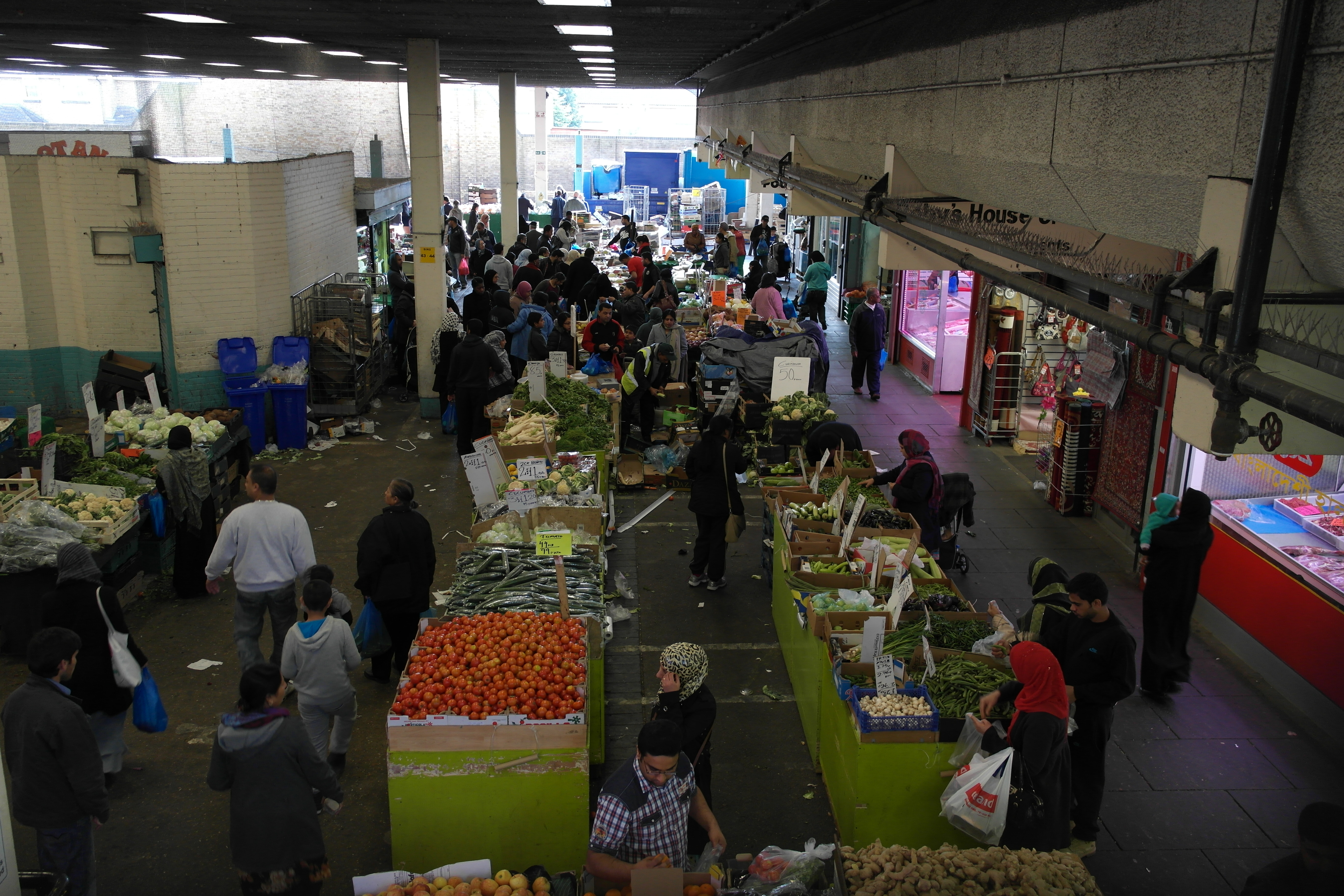
Queen's Market is a specialist draw for South Asian food.

Queen's Market, also known as Queen's Road Market, and Green Street Market, is a historic street market in the London Borough of Newham. It lies adjacent to Green Street and Upton Park tube station.

The street market originated in Green Street at the boundary between East Ham and West Ham in the late Victorian era when the new suburb of East Ham began to be developed. Originally the stall holders were English Cockney, Gypsy communities and Jewish traders from Whitechapel and the East End, selling clothing and vegetables. The traders were pushed into Queen's Road in 1904 to stop them obstructing the main road and to allow for the passage of trams. It was not until 1925 that the borough obtained statutory powers to regulate street markets. Since the late 1960s and 1970s South Asians from India, Pakistan, Bangladesh, Sri Lanka and Asian-Africans started moving families into homes locally and set up stalls and shops along Green Street and inside Queen's Market. Today Queen's Market has a specialist retail offer of South Asian and African food and textiles. Queen's is one of London's most ethnically diverse street markets serving communities from African, Afro-Caribbean, South Asian, South American and newer European communities with affordable and culturally-appropriate food and clothes.

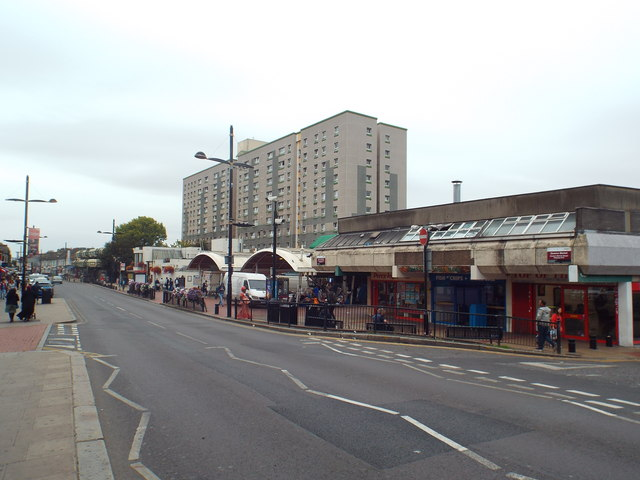
The market from Green Street

In the 1960s the mock-Brutalist exterior around the markets space frame structure was covered with a roof, making it one of London's few covered street markets. The market is popular, serving visitors beyond Newham and remains the most successful publicly owned street market in Newham. It is open four days a week (Tuesday, Thursday, Friday, Saturday) and has started a Sunday market selling second-hand goods.

In November 2006, in the face of a vigorous local campaign of opposition, Newham Council proposed a redevelopment of the existing market site which was to include a supermarket and luxury housing above a much smaller covered market. Following the local campaign, in May 2009 then Mayor of London Boris Johnson directed Newham Council to refuse planning permission to redevelop the market.

A notable trader at the Queen's is Muhammad Shahid Nazir, more commonly known as the One Pound Fish Man. He rose to fame as a fish trader at the Queen's Market through his composition of a market trader's song. It became a viral hit through shoppers at the Queen's Market recording him and uploading to YouTube. It gave Nazir a record deal, with his single released on 7 December 2012.
