= Plaistow tube station =

London Underground station

Plaistow
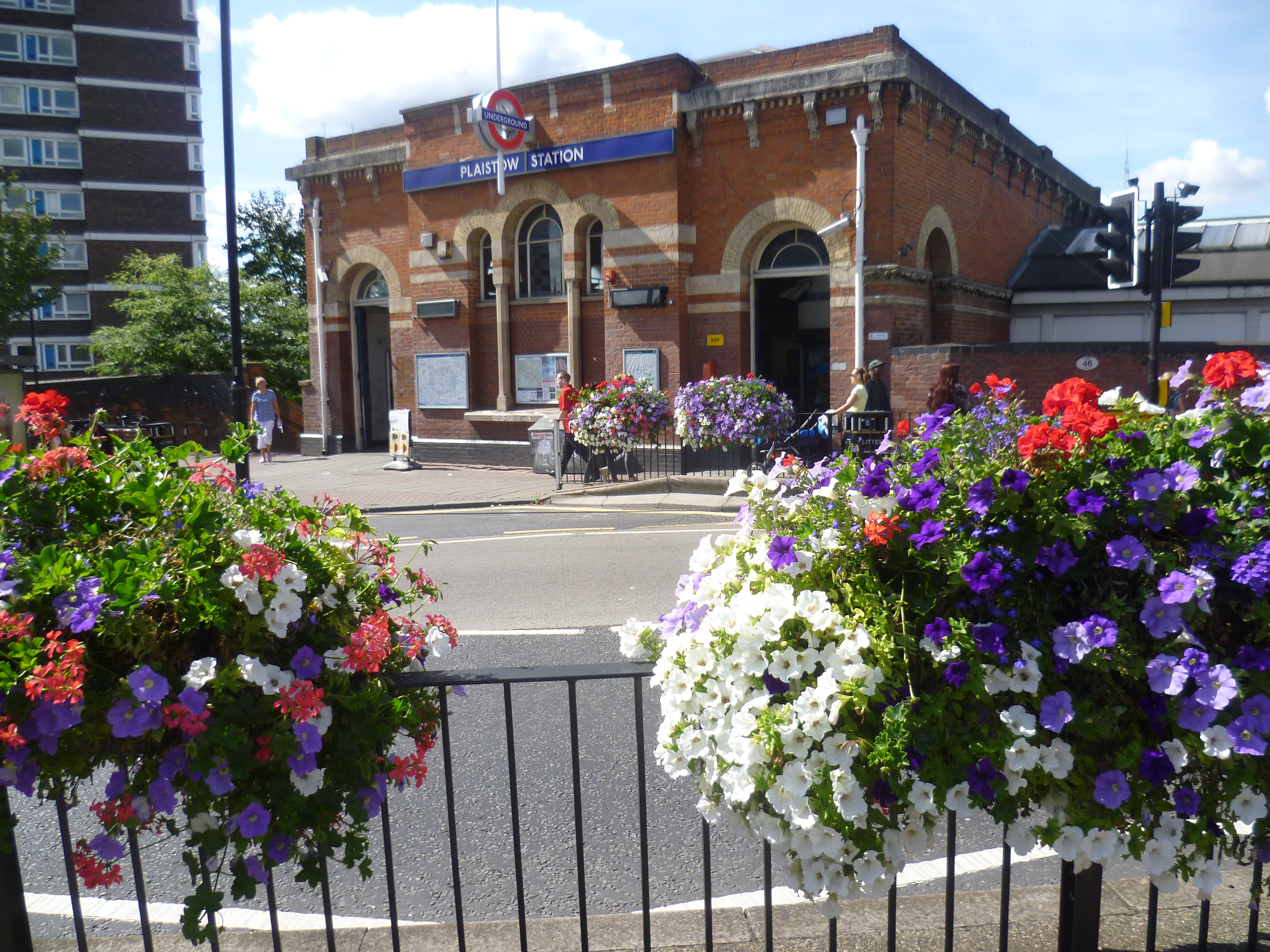
- Entrance on Plaistow Road

General information
- Location: Plaistow, Newham
- Coordinates: 51.53138°N 0.01722°E
- Owner: Transport for London
- Manager: London Underground
- Platforms: 3

Other information
- Fare zone: 3
- Website: Official website

History
- Opened: 31 March 1858
- Original company: London, Tilbury and Southend Railway
- Pre-grouping: Midland Railway
- Post-grouping: London, Midland and Scottish Railway

Key dates
- 18 May 1869: North London Railway started
- 2 June 1902: District line started
- 1 January 1916: North London Railway withdrawn
- 30 March 1936: Metropolitan line started
- 1 January 1948: Ownership transferred to British Railways
- 14 June 1962: London–Southend withdrawn
- 1 January 1969: Ownership transferred to London Transport

Passengers

London Underground annual entry and exit
- 2021: ▼2.67 million
- 2022: ▲4.01 million
- 2023: ▲4.38 million
- 2024: ▲4.47 million
- 2025: ▲4.63 million
Location
- Location in Newham

Plaistow (/ˈplɑːstoʊ/ PLAHST-oh or /ˈplæstoʊ/ PLAST-oh) is a London Underground station, on Plaistow Road in the Plaistow neighbourhood of the London Borough of Newham, East London. It is on the District and Hammersmith & City lines, between West Ham to the west and Upton Park to the east. The station was opened by the London, Tilbury and Southend Railway on 31 March 1858 on a new more direct route from Fenchurch Street to Barking. The station was expanded to accommodate the electric District Railway services on an additional set of tracks in 1905. In the late 19th and early 20th centuries the station served as an eastern terminus for North London Railway trains. Metropolitan line service commenced in 1936. The Fenchurch Street–Southend British Railways service was withdrawn in 1962, leaving abandoned platforms. It is in London fare zone 3.

== History ==
The London, Tilbury and Southend Railway (LTSR) direct line between Bow and Barking was constructed east–west through the middle of the parish of West Ham with service starting on 31 March 1858. Prior to the building of the line, trains took a longer and more congested route via Stratford and Forest Gate. The new line initially had stations at Bromley, Plaistow and East Ham. From 18 May 1869 the North London Railway (NLR) ran a daily service to Plaistow via the Bow–Bromley curve, terminating at the northern bay platform. (Note: The western terminus was Chalk Farm from 18 May 1869, Bow from 1 October 1871, Chalk Farm from 1 June 1877 and Bow from 1 February 1878.) Upton Park was added as the next station to the east of Plaistow on 1 September 1877. West Ham was added to the west in 1901.

The Whitechapel and Bow Railway opened on 2 June 1902 and allowed through services of the District Railway to operate to Upminster. Service began at Plaistow on 2 June 1902. The District Railway was electrified over a second pair of tracks, with electric service operating from 30 September 1905. The District provided the majority of services at the station by 1912. In 1905 the NLR service switched to a new bay platform on the southern side. The London, Tilbury and Southend Railway became part of the Midland Railway in 1912. The NLR service to Plaistow ceased on 1 January 1916. The Midland Railway was amalgamated into the London, Midland and Scottish Railway (LMS) on 1 January 1923. The District Railway was incorporated into London Transport in 1933, and became known as the District line.

The eastern section of the District line was very overcrowded by the mid 1930s. In order to relieve this, the Metropolitan line service was extended to Barking. (Note: This was achieved by diverting Metropolitan line trains that had previously been routed onto the East London Line at Whitechapel.) Plaistow was served by a single daily Metropolitan line train from Hammersmith from 30 March 1936. This was expanded from 4 May 1936 with an eight trains per hour service between Barking and Hammersmith at peak times. This was increased to ten trains per hour at Plaistow from 8 May 1938. (Note: The two extra trains terminated at East Ham.) The Hammersmith service was swapped for longer Uxbridge trains from 17 July 1939, at eight trains per hour at peak times. This service was suspended on 6 October 1941 with Hammersmith trains again running to Barking. The 1947 timetable shows only a few services a day on the Fenchurch Street–Southend line calling at Plaistow and a frequent service provided by the District line.

After nationalisation of the railways in 1948, management of the station passed to British Railways. The Fenchurch Street–Southend services were withdrawn on 14 June 1962 with the introduction of full overhead line electric service. (Note: Limited summer services to Southend continued throughout the 1960s.) On 1 January 1969 ownership transferred to the London Underground. On 30 July 1990, the Hammersmith–Barking service of the Metropolitan line gained a separate identity as the Hammersmith & City line. From 13 December 2009, off-peak Hammersmith & City line service was extended from Whitechapel to Barking with a daily all-day service at Plaistow.

== Design ==
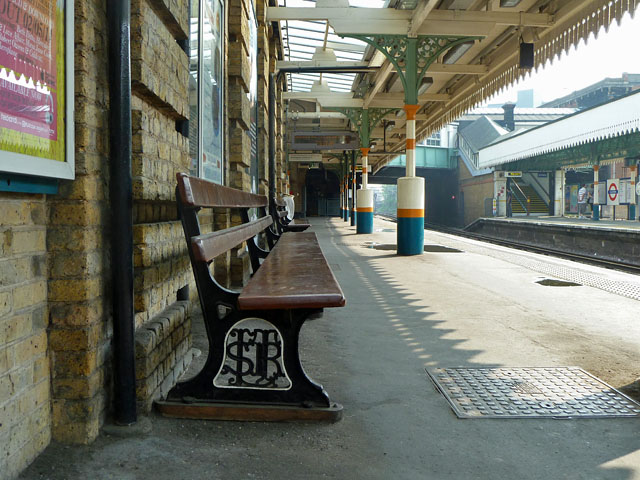
'LTSR' bench on the eastbound platform

The station consists of three operational platforms on an east–west alignment. Platform 3, the northernmost, is a bay to reverse eastbound trains. (Note: The bay platform is rarely used in regular timetabled service.) Immediately to the south, platform 2 is for eastbound service and platform 1 is for westbound service. The disused platforms of the Fenchurch Street to Southend services are to the south of the operational platforms. The two-storey station booking hall at street level is to a unique design for the line and dates from 1882/3. Part of the southern wall of the 1880 Plaistow railway works remains as the northern wall of the eastbound platform. The remainder of the station buildings are from the 1902/3 expansion for District Railway service. There are several surviving benches and canopy supports with 'LTSR' initials incorporated into the design. The station has a local listing by Newham Council for its historic interest. In 2025 the station was shortlisted by Transport for London for works to make it step-free, subject to a feasibility study and available funding.

== Location ==
The station is located in the suburb of Plaistow on Plaistow Road, in the London Borough of Newham. It is served by London Buses routes 69, 241, 262 and 473. Upton Park is 1.29 kilometres (0.80 mi) to the east of the station and West Ham is 0.76 kilometres (0.47 mi) to the west. It is 7.36 kilometres (4.57 mi) along the line from Tower Hill in Central London and 17.32 kilometres (10.76 mi) from the eastern terminus at Upminster.

== Services ==
The station is managed by London Underground. It is in London fare zone 3. The typical off-peak service from the station is twelve District line trains per hour to Upminster with a further three trains to Barking. There are fifteen trains westbound to Earl's Court, of which six continue to Ealing Broadway, six continue to Richmond and three to Wimbledon. At peak periods the number of trains per hour increases. There are six Hammersmith & City line trains an hour to Barking and six to Hammersmith at all times.

Services towards central London operate from approximately 05:00 to 00:15 and services to Upminster operate from approximately 05:45 to 01:00. The journey time to Upminster is approximately 24 minutes, to Barking 7 minutes and to Tower Hill in central London 16 minutes. With 4.63 million entries and exits in 2025, it was ranked the 134th busiest London Underground station.

== Notes ==
Preceding station	London Underground	Following station
West Ham towards Hammersmith	Hammersmith & City line	Upton Park towards Barking
West Ham towards Wimbledon, Richmond or Ealing Broadway	District line	Upton Park towards Upminster
Former services
Bromley	Eastern Region of British Railways; London, Tilbury and Southend	Upton Park
