= Elliott Seabrooke =

English painter (1886–1950)

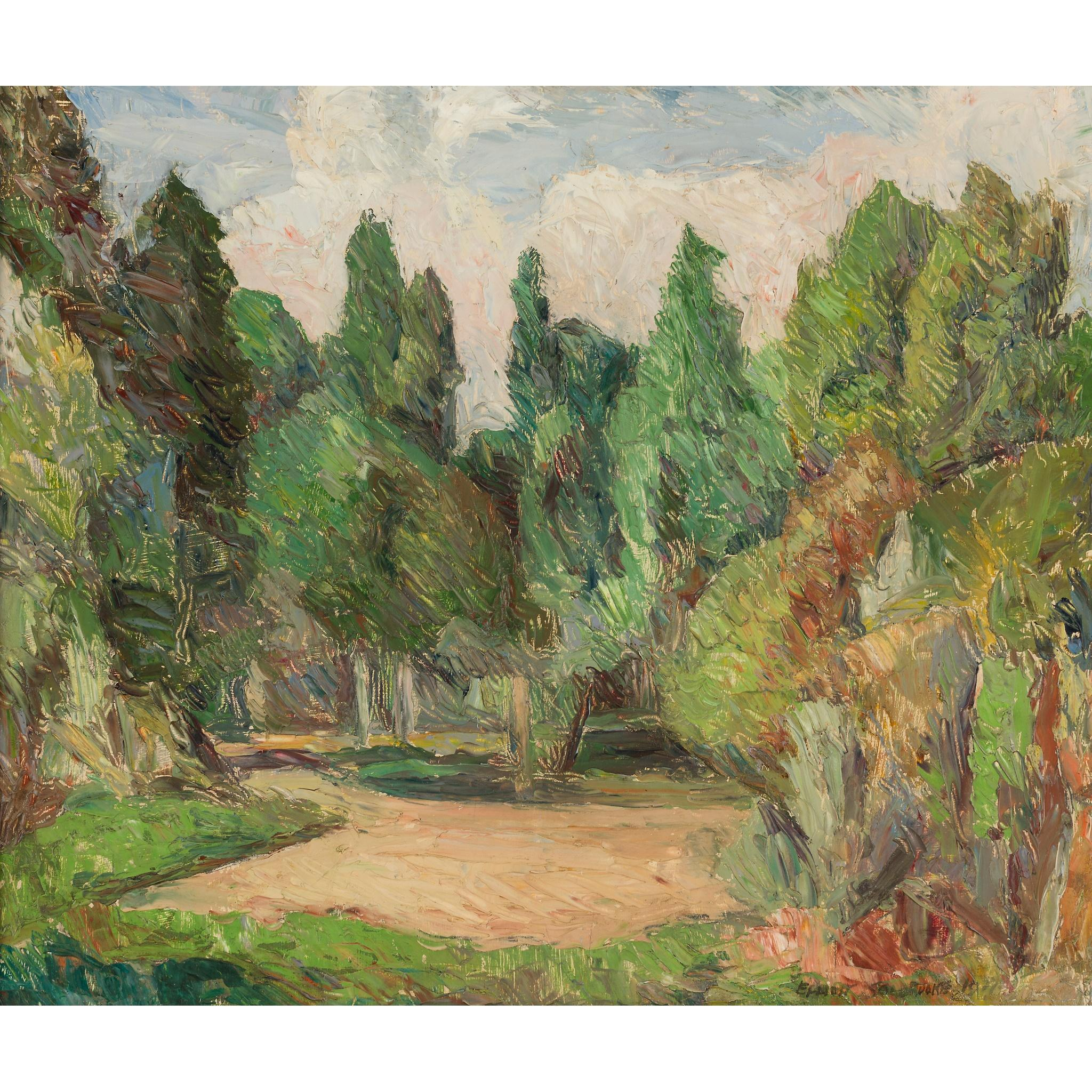
Woodland View, oil on board, by Seabrook

Elliott Seabrooke (1886–1950) was a British landscape and still-life painter. His work is in the permanent collection of the Tate.

Seabrooke was born in Upton Park, Essex (now London). He trained at the Slade School of Fine Art from 1906 to 1911.
