= Upton Park, London =

Area in the east of London

Upton Park
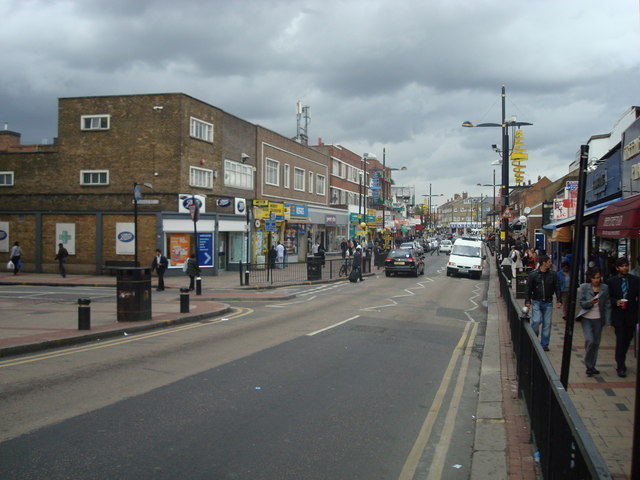
- Green Street in Upton Park

- Location within Greater London
- OS grid reference: TQ405837
- London borough: Newham
- Ceremonial county: Greater London
- Region: London
- Country: England
- Sovereign state: United Kingdom
- Post town: LONDON
- Postcode district: E6, E13
- Dialling code: 020
- Police: Metropolitan
- Fire: London
- Ambulance: London
- London Assembly: City and East

Upton Park is an area in the east of London, in the London Borough of Newham. It is centred on Green Street which is the boundary between West Ham and East Ham. West Ham United Football Club formerly played at the Boleyn Ground, commonly known as Upton Park.

== History ==
=== Toponymy ===
The place name ultimately derives from the farmstead and hamlet of Upton, sited at Upton Lane in the parish of West Ham. The place name is first recorded as Hupington in 1203. The place name is thought likely to mean 'at the high lying farmstead'.

The term 'Upton Park' was later applied to a housing estate developed to the east of West Ham Park in the 1880s. The estate took its name from the adjacent village of Upton with the suffix 'Park' added for marketing reasons. The estate's developers paid for a new station to be built which was named after the estate. Consequently, the area surrounding the station became known as Upton Park rather than the term being limited to the original housing estate.

=== Local government ===
Green Street is a former tramway which divided the former Essex County Boroughs of East Ham and West Ham.

Originally a part of the hundred of Becontree, and part of the historic county of Essex, since 1965, Upton Park has been part of the London Borough of Newham, a local government district of Greater London.

=== Football ===
The southern end of Green Street runs alongside the western edge of the former Boleyn Ground, the original home ground of West Ham United FC. The club initially rented the land from Green Street House, known locally as Boleyn Castle because of its imposing nature and an association with Anne Boleyn. The football stadium was commonly known as Upton Park. After the 2015–16 season, West Ham relocated to the former Olympic Stadium in Stratford and the Boleyn Ground has now been demolished.

An unrelated football club of the area, Upton Park FC, were early pioneers in the game, and represented Great Britain at the 1900 Summer Olympics football tournament, where they won the gold medal. They played their home games at West Ham Park, which was host to the first ever FA Cup goal, scored by Jarvis Kenrick for Clapham Rovers in a 3–0 victory over Upton Park on 11 November 1871.

Upton Park F.C was founded in 1866, and is believed to have folded for the second and last time around 1911, while West Ham United were founded as Thames Ironworks F.C. in 1895, before reforming as West Ham in 1900, playing their first games at Upton Park, the Boleyn Ground, from 1904.

== Governance ==
The Upton Park area is in the London Borough of Newham, but it is not the name of any of its electoral wards. It is roughly encompassed by the wards Green Street East/Green Street West in the north, and Plaistow North/Plaistow South and Boleyn in the south.

== Geography ==
Many shops in the area cater for east London's large Asian community. Queens Road Market is a covered food and clothing market on Queens Road, off Green Street near the tube station. It was formerly a large open-air street market until the current structure was built in the 1980s.

=== Priory Park ===
Upton Park also contains a green space, Priory Park 51°32′6.26″N 0°2′31.1″E, extending from the north east corner of the Boleyn Ground.

== Transport ==
The southern area, near the Boleyn Ground, is served by Upton Park tube station, in Green Street, on the District and Hammersmith and City lines of the London Underground.

Forest Gate railway station on the Great Eastern Main Line served by the Elizabeth line, and Wanstead Park railway station on the Gospel Oak to Barking line served by London Overground's Suffragette line trains, are both near the northern end of Green Street.

Many buses serve the Upton Park Area such as 5, 58, 104, 115, 147, 238, 330, 376 and N15.

On the road network, Green Street itself runs on a north–south axis, linking the A118 Romford Road in the north and the A124 Barking Road in the south, both major arterial routes linking central London to the eastern counties.

== Notable people ==
- Elliott Seabrooke (1886–1950), British landscape and still-life painter, born in Upton Park.
