= Upton Park tube station =

London Underground station

Upton Park
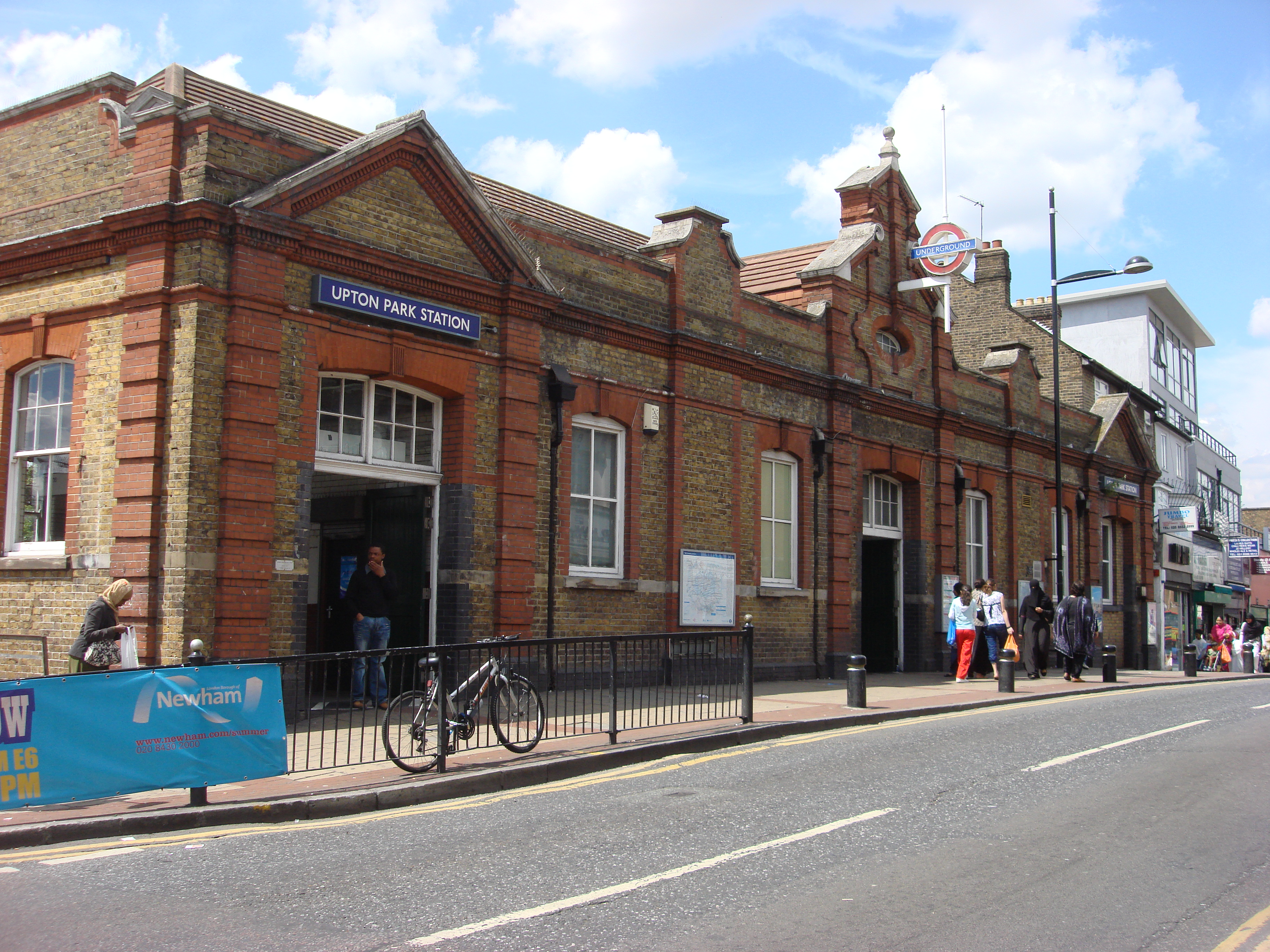
- Main entrance on Green Street

General information
- Location: Upton Park, Newham
- Coordinates: 51.535°N 0.0344°E
- Owner: Transport for London
- Manager: London Underground
- Platforms: 2

Other information
- Fare zone: 3
- Website: Official website

History
- Opened: 17 September 1877
- Original company: London, Tilbury and Southend Railway
- Pre-grouping: Midland Railway
- Post-grouping: London, Midland and Scottish Railway

Key dates
- 2 June 1902: District line started
- 30 March 1936: Metropolitan line started
- 1 January 1948: Ownership transferred to British Railways
- 14 June 1962: London–Southend withdrawn
- 1 January 1969: Ownership transferred to London Transport

Passengers

London Underground annual entry and exit
- 2021: ▼4.78 million
- 2022: ▲7.69 million
- 2023: ▲8.49 million
- 2024: ▲11.26 million
- 2025: ▲11.29 million
Location
- Location in Newham

Upton Park is a London Underground station, located on Green Street in the Upton Park neighbourhood of the London Borough of Newham, East London. It is on the District and Hammersmith & City lines, between Plaistow to the west and East Ham to the east. Designed and built by the developer of the Upton Park housing estate, the station was opened by the London, Tilbury and Southend Railway on 17 September 1877 as an infill station on the route from Fenchurch Street to Barking. The large Edwardian station building was constructed to accommodate the electric District Railway services on an additional set of tracks opened in 1905. Metropolitan line service commenced in 1936. The Fenchurch Street–Southend British Railways service was withdrawn in 1962, leaving abandoned platforms. It is in London fare zone 3.

== History ==
The London, Tilbury and Southend Railway (LTSR) direct line between Bow and Barking was constructed east–west through the middle of the parish of West Ham with service starting on 31 March 1858. Prior to the building of the line, trains took a longer and more congested route via Stratford and Forest Gate. The new line initially had stations at Bromley, Plaistow and East Ham. Upton Park was added as an infill station between Plaistow and East Ham on 17 September 1877. It was the first station on the LTSR to be built by a property developer. It was designed and constructed by Read, the developer of the Upton Park housing estate.

The Whitechapel and Bow Railway opened on 2 June 1902 and allowed through services of the District Railway to operate to Upminster. Service began at Upton Park on 2 June 1902. The District Railway was electrified over a second pair of tracks, with electric service operating from 30 September 1905. The station was rebuilt to coincide with electrification, replacing the platforms and the 1877 Read buildings. The District provided the majority of services at the station by 1912. The LTSR was purchased by the Midland Railway (MR) in 1912. With 2.9 million passengers in 1921 it was the 2nd busiest station on the London, Tilbury and Southend line. The MR was amalgamated into the London, Midland and Scottish Railway (LMS) on 1 January 1923. The District Railway was incorporated into London Transport in 1933, and became known as the District line.

The eastern section of the District line was very overcrowded by the mid 1930s. In order to relieve this, the Metropolitan line service was extended to Barking. (Note: This was achieved by diverting Metropolitan line trains that had previously been routed onto the East London Line at Whitechapel.) Upton Park was served by a single daily Metropolitan line train from Hammersmith from 30 March 1936. This was expanded from 4 May 1936 with an eight trains per hour service between Barking and Hammersmith at peak times. This was increased to ten trains per hour at Upton Park from 8 May 1938. (Note: The two extra trains terminated at East Ham.) The Hammersmith service was swapped for longer Uxbridge trains from 17 July 1939, at eight trains per hour at peak times. This service was suspended on 6 October 1941 with Hammersmith trains again running to Barking.

After nationalisation of the railways in 1948, management of the station passed to British Railways. The Fenchurch Street–Southend services were withdrawn on 14 June 1962 with the introduction of full overhead line electric service. (Note: Limited summer services to Southend continued throughout the 1960s.) On 1 January 1969 ownership transferred to the London Underground. On 30 July 1990, the Hammersmith–Barking service of the Metropolitan line gained a separate identity as the Hammersmith & City line. From 13 December 2009, off-peak Hammersmith & City line service was extended from Whitechapel to Barking with a daily all-day service at Upton Park.

== Design ==
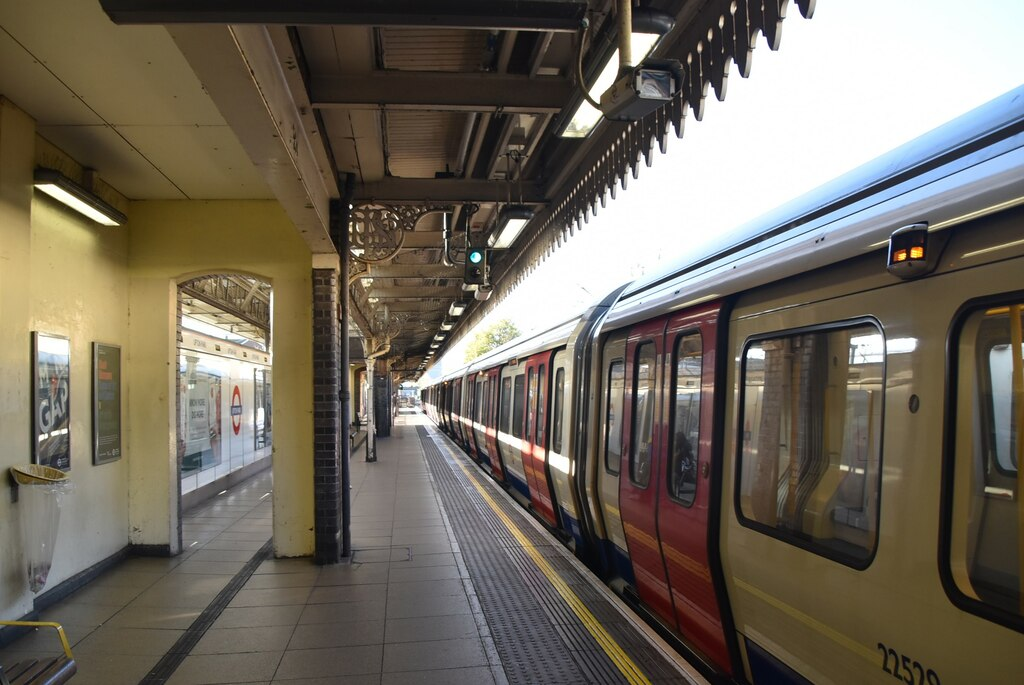
The westbound platform with opened up platform buildings and 'LTSR' canopy support

No trace remains of the original station buildings. They were to a unique design by Read. The simple street building was set back from Green Street with a pitched roof and entrance canopy. The station consists of two operational platforms on an east–west alignment. Platform 2, the northernmost, is for eastbound service. Platform 1 is for westbound service. The Edwardian brick station building that sits above the tracks is from the 1902 rebuild for District Railway service. The disused platforms of the Fenchurch Street to Southend services are to the south of the operational platforms. The canopy with 'LTSR' supports from the rebuild remain on the westbound platform, but the canopy and staircase to the eastbound platform are 1950s replacements. On the westbound platform, two of four platform buildings have been opened up by the removal of their platform-facing walls. In 2025 the station was shortlisted by Transport for London for works to make it step-free, subject to a feasibility study and available funding.

== Location ==
The station is located on Green Street, in the London Borough of Newham. It is named after the Upton Park housing development built in the Victorian era. It is served by London Buses routes 58, 104, 330 and 376.

East Ham is 1.4 kilometres (0.87 mi) to the east of the station and Plaistow is 1.29 kilometres (0.80 mi) to the west. It is 8.65 kilometres (5.37 mi) along the line from Tower Hill in Central London and 16.03 kilometres (9.96 mi) from the eastern terminus at Upminster. The station is 5 miles 28 chains (8.6 km) down the line from Fenchurch Street.

== Services ==
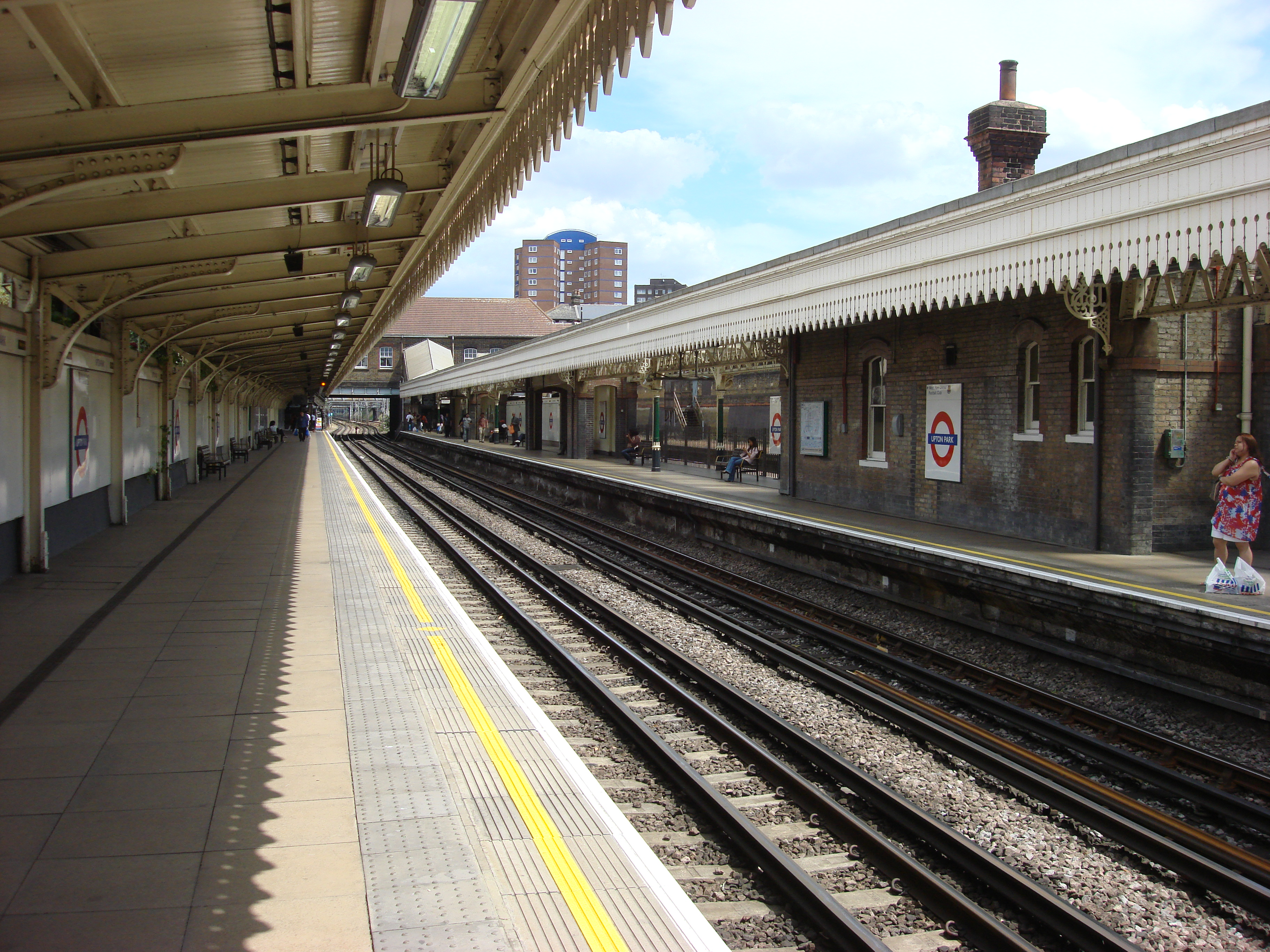
The eastbound and westbound platforms following refurbishment

The station is managed by London Underground. It is in London fare zone 3. The typical off-peak service from the station is twelve District line trains per hour to Upminster with a further three trains to Barking. There are fifteen trains westbound to Earl's Court, of which six continue to Ealing Broadway, six continue to Richmond and three to Wimbledon. At peak periods the number of trains per hour increases. There are six Hammersmith & City line trains an hour to Barking and six to Hammersmith at all times.

Services towards central London operate from approximately 05:00 to 00:00 and services to Upminster operate from approximately 06:00 to 01:00. The journey time to Upminster is approximately 22 minutes, to Barking 5 minutes and to Tower Hill in central London 18 minutes. With 11.29 million entries and exits in 2025, it was ranked the 57th busiest London Underground station.

== Notes ==
Preceding station	London Underground	Following station
Plaistow towards Hammersmith	Hammersmith & City line	East Ham towards Barking
Plaistow towards Wimbledon, Richmond or Ealing Broadway	District line	East Ham towards Upminster
Former services
Plaistow	Eastern Region of British Railways; London, Tilbury and Southend	East Ham
