= Newham London Borough Council elections =

Class of UK elections

A map showing the wards of Newham from 2002 to 2022

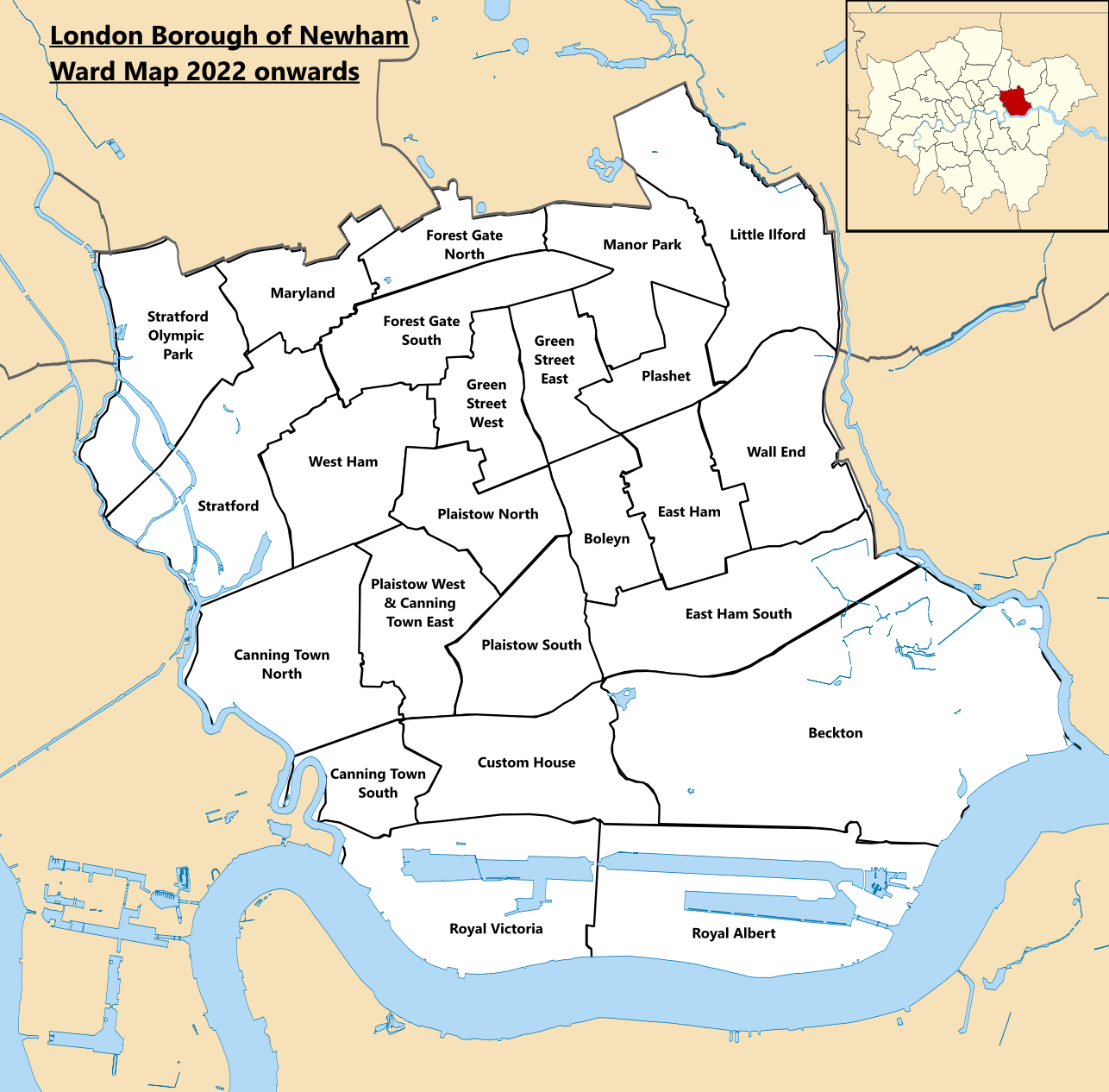
A map showing the wards of Newham from 2022 to present

Newham London Borough Council is elected every four years.

== Council elections ==
Year	Labour	RA	NIP	Green (Note: Green Party (UK), 1986–1990.)	Liberal Democrats (Note: Liberal Party, 1964–1974; SDP–Liberal Alliance, 1982–1986.)	Conservative	CPA	Respect	Council control after election
1964	50	7	–	–	3	0	–	–	Labour
1968	30	21	–	–	3	6	–	–	No overall control
1971	53	7	–	–	0	0	–	–	Labour
1974	51	9	–	–	0	0	–	–	Labour
1978 (Note: Boundary changes took place but the number of seats remained the same.)	57	3	–	–	–	0	–	–	Labour
1982	54	–	–	–	6	0	–	–	Labour
1986	60	–	–	0	0	0	–	–	Labour
1990	57	–	–	0	1	2	–	–	Labour
1994 (Note: Boundary changes took place but the number of seats remained the same. (Note: The East London Boroughs (London Borough Boundaries) Order 1993) (Note: The East London Boroughs (London Borough Boundaries) (No. 2) Order 1993))	59	–	–	0	1	0	–	–	Labour
1998	60	0	–	–	0	0	–	–	Labour
2002 (Note: Boundary changes took place but the number of seats remained the same.)	59	–	–	0	0	0	1	–	Labour
2006	54	–	–	0	0	0	3	3	Labour
2010	60	–	–	0	0	0	0	0	Labour
2014	60	–	–	0	0	0	0	–	Labour
2018	60	–	–	0	0	0	0	–	Labour
2022 (Note: Boundary changes took place and the number of seats increased from 60 to 66.)	64	–	–	2	0	0	0	–	Labour
2026	26	–	24	16	0	0	0	–	No overall control

== Borough result maps ==
2002 results map

2006 results map

2010 results map

2014 results map

2018 results map

2022 results map

2026 results map

== By-election results ==
=== 1964-1968 ===
There were no by-elections.

=== 1968-1971 ===
West Ham by-election, 6 February 1969
Party	Candidate	Votes	%	±%
Labour	T. H. Camp	613		
Conservative	R. J. Blake	275		
Residents	J. P. Davis	188		
Liberal	J. W. Giles	146		
National Front	J. B. Newham	142		
Majority		438		N/A
Turnout			22.4	
Registered electors				
Labour hold		Swing		

South by-election, 4 June 1970
Party	Candidate	Votes	%	±%
Labour	J. C. Taylor	1,164		
Conservative	A. J. Retter	373		
National Front	W. T. Anderson	17		
Majority		791		N/A
Turnout			15.3	
Registered electors				
Labour hold		Swing		

=== 1971-1974 ===
Custom House and Silvertown by-election, 23 November 1972
Party	Candidate	Votes	%	±%
Labour	W. A. Chapman	841		
Ratepayers	R. F. C. Ower	200		
National Front	A. J. Hammond	181		
Conservative	M. L. Jordan	25		
Turnout		8178	15.2%	

=== 1974-1978 ===
Manor Park by-election, 9 October 1975
Party	Candidate	Votes	%	±%
Labour	Christopher J. Palme	799		
Ratepayers	James W. F. Hucker	758		
Conservative	Cyril A. Rugg	574		
Liberal	Lionel H. Cohen	120		
Turnout		9393	24.0%	

Canning Town and Grange by-election, 14 July 1977
Party	Candidate	Votes	%	±%
Labour	Jack A. Hart	787		
National Front	John J. Johnston	260		
Conservative Trade Unionist	Robert F. Williams	160		
Liberal	Anthony Hetherington	115		
Ratepayers	Michael L. Finch	40		
Labour, Co-op & Trade Union	John Clements	17		
Turnout		4777	29.0%	

Hudsons by-election, 14 July 1977
Party	Candidate	Votes	%	±%
Labour	Frederick Jones	1024		
Conservative	Edward J. Oakes	438		
National Front	Robert D. V. Ray	290		
Ratepayers	George V. S. Nottage	103		
Liberal	Margaret Bahr	47		
Turnout		8002	23.8%	

=== 1978-1982 ===
Central by-election, 8 November 1979
Party	Candidate	Votes	%	±%
Labour	Christopher J. McLoughlin	872		
Liberal	David J. Corney	574		
Conservative	Donald MacIver	162		
Ratepayers	Herbert H. Martin	155		
Socialist Current Organisation	Margaret R. Boukerou	28		
Turnout			28.4%	
Labour hold		Swing		

The by-election was called following the death of Cllr Henry Ronan.

South by-election, 8 November 1979
Party	Candidate	Votes	%	±%
Labour	Leonard D. Manley	792		
Ratepayers & Citizens	Francis C. Nicholson	233		
Conservative	Cedric A. Day	197		
Ind. Socialist	David T. Grainger	79		
National Front	Carol A. Armond	50		
Turnout			17.6%	
Labour hold		Swing		

The by-election was called following the resignation of Cllr Joseph Taylor.

Castle by-election, 27 March 1980
Party	Candidate	Votes	%	±%
Labour	John A. McAulay	956		
Ratepayers & Citizens	Alfred W. R. King	553		
Conservative	Peter J. Doe	147		
Turnout			25.6%	
Labour hold		Swing		

The by-election was called following the resignation of Cllr Herbert Simpson.

Central by-election, 15 May 1980
Party	Candidate	Votes	%	±%
Labour	Alan Mattingly	1050		
Liberal	David J. Corney	815		
Ratepayers & Citizens	Francis C. Nicholson	123		
Conservative	Donald MacIver	83		
Turnout			33.2%	
Labour hold		Swing		

The by-election was called following the death of Cllr Sidney Elson.

Wall End by-election, 15 May 1980
Party	Candidate	Votes	%	±%
Labour	Sarah J. Reeves	1282		
Conservative	Damian P. J. Sutton	451		
Ratepayers & Citizens	Stanley Vine	209		
Liberal	Christopher M. Hill	153		
Turnout			24.1%	
Labour hold		Swing		

The by-election was called following the resignation of Cllr John Clark.

=== 1982-1986 ===
Forest Gate by-election, 14 June 1984
Party	Candidate	Votes	%	±%
Labour	Margaret P. Olley	1517		
Liberal	David C. Powell	469		
Conservative	Robin D. Atter	407		
Turnout		7845	30.7%	
Labour hold		Swing		

The by-election was called following the resignation of Cllr Michael Foley. Liberal Party stood as Liberal Alliance Focus Team.

Little Ilford by-election, 14 June 1984
Party	Candidate	Votes	%	±%
Liberal	Ann C. Winfield	1868		
Labour	Stephen Timms	1780		
Labour	Colin M. Copus	1763		
Liberal	Rif Winfield	1715		
Turnout		8431	45.3%	
Liberal hold		Swing		
Labour gain from Liberal		Swing		

The by-election was called following the resignations of Cllrs Ann Winfield and Rif Winfield. Liberal Party stood as Liberal Focus Team.

New Town by-election, 28 June 1984
Party	Candidate	Votes	%	±%
Labour	Wendy Mallard	987		
Alliance	Lee Reeves	264		
Conservative	Victor E. Jackson	125		
Turnout		4845	28.4%	
Labour hold		Swing		

The by-election was called following the resignation of Cllr Maurice Sampson.

=== 1986-1990 ===
South by-election, 5 February 1987
Party	Candidate	Votes	%	±%
Alliance	Alec J. Kellaway	1000		
Labour	Doris A. Maxwell	805		
Conservative	Damian P. J. Sutton	769		
Green	Terence C. J. Macdonald	68		
Turnout		9240	28.66%	
Alliance gain from Labour		Swing		

The by-election was called following the resignation death of Cllr John Wilson.

Little Ilford by-election, 13 October 1988
Party	Candidate	Votes	%	±%
Labour	Lyn Brown	1027		
Liberal Democrats	Leslie E. Groombridge	614		
Conservative	John P. R. Colthurst	324		
Independent	Dexter H. Hanoomansingh	54		
Turnout			24.89%	
Labour hold		Swing		

The by-election was called following the resignation of Cllr Colin Copus.

St Stephens by-election, 13 October 1988
Party	Candidate	Votes	%	±%
Labour	Catherine J. Parry	704		
Conservative	Charles R. P. G. Meaby	219		
Independent Labour	Baldev Barrah	214		
SDP	Peter Bragg	143		
Liberal Democrats	Matthew M. Huntbach	49		
Turnout			24.77%	
Labour hold		Swing		

The by-election was called following the death of Cllr Thomas Nolan.

Plashet by-election, 30 November 1989
Party	Candidate	Votes	%	±%
Labour	Mohammad K. Khawaja	801		
Conservative	Barry W. Roberts	385		
Green	Amanda J. Sandford	205		
Liberal Democrats	Mohammed A. Siddiqui	149		
Turnout			18.79%	
Labour hold		Swing		

The by-election was called following the resignation of Cllr Joseph Sambrano.

=== 1990-1994 ===
Bemersyde by-election, 27 June 1991
Party	Candidate	Votes	%	±%
Conservative	Paul Clark	552	35.0%	
Labour	Neil J. Wilson	524	33.2%	
Liberal Democrats	Leslie E. Groombridge	410	26.0%	
Green	Philip H. Rimmer	91	5.8%	
Turnout			36.3%	
Conservative gain from Labour		Swing		

The by-election was called following the resignation of Cllr David Kellaway.

Forest Gate by-election, 27 February 1992
Party	Candidate	Votes	%	±%
Labour	Glynis A. Carpenter	1094	46.7%	
Conservative	Richard J. Arnopp	634	27.0%	
Liberal Democrats	Stephen T. Bell	489	20.9%	
Green	Arthur L. Taylor	128	5.5%	
Turnout			31.1%	
Labour hold		Swing		

The by-election was called following the disqualification of Cllr Pamela Furness.

Central by-election, 9 July 1992
Party	Candidate	Votes	%	±%
Labour	Ian K. Corbett	711	56.9%	
Conservative	Thirugnanam Rameshan	416	33.3%	
Green	Arthur L. Taylor	122	9.8%	
Turnout			22.2%	
Labour hold		Swing		

The by-election was called following the resignation of Cllr Pallavi Patel.

Little IIford by-election, 9 July 1992
Party	Candidate	Votes	%	±%
Labour	Andrew R. Baikie	836		
Labour	Robin Wales	772		
Liberal Democrats	Leslie E. Groombridge	580		
Liberal Democrats	Kathleen V. King	551		
Conservative	Colin D. Robinson	485		
Conservative	Gary C. Whitmarsh	449		
Turnout			24.1%	
Labour hold		Swing		
Labour hold		Swing		

The by-election was called following the resignation of Cllrs Patricia Heron and Bobby Thomas.

Greatfield by-election, 26 November 1992
Party	Candidate	Votes	%	±%
Conservative	Gary C. Whitmarsh	818	38.3%	
Labour	Derek W. Jones	780	36.6%	
Liberal Democrats	Kathleen V. King	536	25.1%	
Turnout			26.1%	
Conservative hold		Swing		

The by-election was called following the resignation of Cllr Sean Cadogan.

Custom House and Silvertown by-election, 6 May 1993
Party	Candidate	Votes	%	±%
Labour	Christopher T. Raddey	1137	45.5%	
Conservative	David C. Gladstone	999	40.0%	
Liberal Democrats	Patricia Holland	306	12.2%	
Liberal	Elizabeth Oram	56	2.2%	
Turnout			28.7%	
Labour hold		Swing		

The by-election was called following the resignation of Cllr Kevin Gillespie.

Park by-election, 6 May 1993
Party	Candidate	Votes	%	±%
Labour	John Saunders	987	61.2%	
Conservative	Charles Meaby	276	17.1%	
Green	Ian Trebetherick	214	13.3%	
Anti-Federalist League	Gerard Batten	75	4.7%	
Monster Raving Loony	Lord Toby Jug	60	3.7%	
Turnout			22.7%	
Labour hold		Swing		

The by-election was called following the resignation of Cllr Dominic Gough.

=== 1994-1998 ===
South by-election, 26 January 1995
Party	Candidate	Votes	%	±%
Labour	Sarah Ruiz	1441		
Conservative	Christopher Boden	473		
BNP	Peter Hart	360		
Newham Independent	Alex Thompson	276		
Liberal Democrats	Elizabeth Laird	248		
Turnout				
Labour hold		Swing		

The by-election was called following the death of Cllr Thomas Jenkinson.

Forest Gate by-election, 21 November 1996
Party	Candidate	Votes	%	±%
Labour	Graeme M. Cambage	757		
Socialist Labour	Anne E. J. Brook	326		
Conservative	Ian A. Riddoch	205		
Independent	Fergus M. Dodd	138		
BNP	Colin D. Smith	86		
Liberal Democrats	Elizabeth C. Lutzeier	63		
Turnout				
Labour hold		Swing		

The by-election was called following the resignation of Cllr Glynis Carpenter.

Central by-election, 23 January 1997
Party	Candidate	Votes	%	±%
Labour	Sardar Ali	910		
Conservative	Carol A. Costantino	258		
BNP	Michael P. Davidson	97		
Turnout				
Labour hold		Swing		

The by-election was called following the resignation of Cllr Christopher Allen.

Canning Town and Grange by-election, 7 May 1997
Party	Candidate	Votes	%	±%
Labour	Clive W. Furness	1567		
Conservative	Christopher Boden	558		
BNP	Michael P. Davidson	407		
Liberal Democrats	Kathleen V. King	282		
Newham Independent	Keith W. Woodman	122		
Turnout				
Labour hold		Swing		

The by-election was called following the resignation of Cllr Dennis Horwood.

Little Ilford by-election, 7 May 1997
Party	Candidate	Votes	%	±%
Labour	Joseph Ejiofor	2450		
Conservative	Zubaida N. Hashmi	449		
Liberal Democrats	David C. Oxford	413		
Newham Independent	Frederick C. Jones	410		
BNP	Pauline Smith	158		
Turnout				
Labour hold		Swing		

The by-election was called following the resignation of Cllr Stephen Timms.

South by-election, 7 May 1997
Party	Candidate	Votes	%	±%
Labour	Quintin B. Peppiatt	3705		
Conservative	Jeanette A. Worth	1396		
Liberal Democrats	Stephen T. Bell	948		
BNP	Peter Hart	642		
Newham Independent	Lillian A. E. Hopes	209		
Turnout				
Labour hold		Swing		

The by-election was called following the death of Cllr Theodore Etherden.

Ordnance by-election, 23 October 1997
Party	Candidate	Votes	%	±%
Labour	Megan Harris	465		
Liberal Democrats	Peter R. W. Guest	99		
BNP	Kenneth F. Francis	84		
Newham Independent	Terence C. Macdonald	59		
Conservative	Richard J. Arnopp	47		
Turnout				
Labour hold		Swing		

The by-election was called following the resignation of Cllr Judith Jorsling.

=== 1998-2002 ===
Custom House and Silvertown by-election, 23 July 1998
Party	Candidate	Votes	%	±%
Labour	Patricia M. Holland	526		
Conservative	Christopher P. Boden	149		
BNP	Paul Borg	112		
Newham Independent	Colin J. Brown	110		
UKIP	Raymond P. Hollands	56		
Turnout				
Labour hold		Swing		

The by-election was called following the death of Cllr William Chapman.

Plashet by-election, 24 February 2000
Party	Candidate	Votes	%	±%
Labour	Regina T. Williams	826		
Conservative	Reza A. S. Choudhury	585		
Newham Independent	Swaminathan Balakrishnan	135		
Turnout				
Labour hold		Swing		

The by-election was called following the death of Cllr Harbans Jabbal.

Stratford by-election, 19 October 2000
Party	Candidate	Votes	%	±%
Labour	Judith Garfield	465		
Conservative	Douglas Taylor	270		
Socialist Alliance	Paul Phillips	60		
Turnout				
Labour hold		Swing		

The by-election was called following the death of Cllr James Newstead.

Custom House and Silvertown by-election, 7 December 2000
Party	Candidate	Votes	%	±%
Labour	David Pinder	578		
Conservative	Paul Maynard	329		
Socialist Alliance	Maureen Stephenson	55		
Turnout				
Labour hold		Swing		

The by-election was called following the resignation of Cllr Christopher Rackley.

Beckton by-election, 29 March 2001
Party	Candidate	Votes	%	±%
Labour	Alan Taylor	384		
Independent	Alan Craig	376		
BNP	Michael Davidson	163		
Conservative	Paul Maynard	99		
Turnout				
Labour hold		Swing		

The by-election was called following the death of Cllr Maureen Knight.

=== 2002-2006 ===
There were no by-elections.

=== 2006-2010 ===
Royal Docks by-election, 26 March 2009
Party	Candidate	Votes	%	±%
Labour	Stephen E. Brayshaw	723		
Conservative	Neil W. R. Pearce	720		
CPA	Anne-Marie Philip	194		
Respect	Haroon Juneja	35		
Turnout			23.59%	−22.32%
Labour hold		Swing		

The by-election was called following the death of Cllr Simon Tucker.

=== 2010-2014 ===
There were no by-elections.

=== 2014-2018 ===
Beckton by-election, 11 September 2014
Party	Candidate	Votes	%	±%
Labour	Tonii Wilson	1,006		
Conservative	Syed Ahmed	798		
UKIP	David Mears	694		
Green	Jane Lithgow	81		
Liberal Democrats	David Thorpe	43		
CPA	Kayode Shedowo	33		
TUSC	Mark Dunne	21		
Labour hold		Swing		

The by-election was called following the death of Cllr Alec Kellaway.

Stratford and New Town by-election, 7 May 2015
Party	Candidate	Votes	%	±%
Labour	Charlene McLean	4,607		
Conservative	Matthew Gass	2,778		
Green	Isabelle Anderson	1,170		
UKIP	Jamie McKenzie	984		
CPA	Joe Mettle	99		
TUSC	Bob Severn	70		
Labour hold		Swing		

The by-election was called following the disqualification due to non-attendance of Cllr Charlene McLean

Boleyn by-election, 3 December 2015
Party	Candidate	Votes	%	±%
Labour	Veronica Oakeshott	1,440		
Liberal Democrats	Sheree Miller	581		
Conservative	Emmanuel Finndoro-Obasi	471		
Green	Frankie-Rose Taylor	207		
UKIP	David Mears	178		
BNP	Diane Marie	104		
Labour hold		Swing		

The by-election was called following the death of Cllr Charity Fibresima

Forest Gate North by-election, 14 July 2016
Party	Candidate	Votes	%	±%
Labour	Anamul Islam	1,150	53	−5.1
Green	Elisabeth Whitebread	681	31	+17.2
Conservative	John Oxley	301	14	+0.2
Liberal Democrats	James Rumsby	57	3	−2.5
Majority				
Turnout		2,189	21	
Labour hold		Swing	11.2 LAB to GRN	

The by-election was called following the resignation of Councillor Ellie Robinson to accept a job with the Mayor of London, Sadiq Khan.

=== 2018-2022 ===
Boleyn by-election, 1 November 2018
Party	Candidate	Votes	%	±%
Labour	Moniba Khan	1,725	74.8	N/A
Conservative	Fazlul Karim	327	14.2	N/A
Green	Frankie Rose-Taylor	172	7.5	+3.5
Liberal Democrats	Arun Pirapaharan	83	3.6	N/A
Majority		1,398	60.6	N/A
Turnout			23.5	▼15.4
Registered electors				
Labour hold		Swing		

The by-election was called following the resignation of Cllr Veronica Oakeshott.

East Ham Central by-election, 6 May 2021
Party	Candidate	Votes	%	±%
Labour Co-op	Farah Nazeer	2,297	54.4	N/A
Conservative	Sk Zakir Hossain	1,288	30.5	N/A
Green	Danny Keeling	283	6.7	N/A
Liberal Democrats	Ed Comaromi	239	5.7	N/A
CPA	Paul Jobson	115	2.7	N/A
TUSC	Lois Austin	91	2.1	N/A
Majority		1,009	23.9	N/A
Turnout		4,313		N/A
Registered electors				
Labour Co-op hold		Swing		

The by-election was called following the resignation of Cllr Julianne Marriott.

=== 2022-2026 ===
Boleyn by-election, 13th July 2023
Party	Candidate	Votes	%	±%
Independent	Mehmood Mirza	1,153	42.5	N/A
Labour	Sofia Patel	871	32.1	−27.0
Green	Joe Hudson-Small	572	21.1	+3.5
Conservative	Laurencia Durojaiye	69	2.5	−15.6
Reform	Daniel Oxley	23	0.8	N/A
Liberal Democrats	David Terrar	22	0.8	N/A
Majority		282	10.4	
Turnout		2,729	27.7	
Registered electors		9,866		
Independent gain from Labour				

The by-election was called following the resignation of Cllr Cecilia Welsh.

Wall End by-election, 13th July 2023
Party	Candidate	Votes	%	±%
Labour	Stephanie Garfield	1,659	61.1	+12.5
Conservative	Durai Kannan	739	27.2	+12.3
Liberal Democrats	Claire Pattie	138	5.1	N/A
Green	Tassadduq Cheema	123	4.5	−4.5
Reform	David Sandground	58	2.1	−0.2
Majority		920	33.9	
Turnout		2,733	25.1	
Registered electors		10,900		
Labour hold		Swing	▲0.1	

The by-election was called following the resignation of Cllr Luke Charters.

Plaistow North by-election, 23 November 2023
Party	Candidate	Votes	%	±%
Independent	Sophia Naqvi	1,266	46.3	
Labour	Aktharul Alam	750	27.4	
Independent	Anasur Rahman Khan	274	10.0	
Conservative	James Clifford	257	9.4	
Green	Zahra Kheyre	113	4.1	
Liberal Democrats	David Terrar	73	2.7	
Majority		516	18.9	
Turnout		2,733	25.2	−3.2
Registered electors		10,905		
Independent gain from Labour		Swing		

The by-election was called following the resignation of Cllr Daniel Lee-Phakoe.

Forest Gate North by-election, 4 July 2024
Party	Candidate	Votes	%	±%
Labour	Liz Cronin	1,757	43.0	−16.8
Newham Independents	Zakaria Bhariwala	1,073	26.3	+26.3
Green	Zahra Kheyre	810	19.8	+0.8
Conservative	Malcolm Madden	251	6.1	−6.3
Liberal Democrats	Jamie Bryant	192	4.7	−4.1
Majority		684	16.8	
Turnout		4,083		
Labour hold		Swing		

The by-election was called following the resignation of Cllr Sasha Das Gupta.

Maryland by-election, 4 July 2024
Party	Candidate	Votes	%	±%
Labour	Melanie Onovo	1,626	43.0	−17.0
Newham Independents	Linda Jordan	896	23.7	+23.7
Green	Chris Brooks	712	18.8	+2.8
Conservative	Mary Antwi	360	9.5	+0.0
Liberal Democrats	David Terrar	185	4.9	−4.9
Majority		730	19.3	
Turnout		3,779		
Labour hold		Swing		

The by-election was called following the resignation of Cllr Ken Penton.

Beckton by-election, 18 July 2024
Party	Candidate	Votes	%	±%
Labour	Blossom Young	597	38.7	−9.4
Newham Independents	Shahzhad Abbasi	476	30.9	+30.9
Green	Levoir Justine	228	14.8	−15.7
Conservative	Maria Clifford	144	9.3	−5.5
Liberal Democrats	James Alan-Rumsby	96	6.2	+6.2
Majority		121	7.9	
Turnout		1,541		
Labour hold		Swing		

The by-election was called following the resignation of Cllr James Asser.

Little Ilford by-election, 18 July 2024
Party	Candidate	Votes	%	±%
Labour	Akhtarul Alam	884	39.0	−13.4
Newham Independents	Tahir Mirza	738	32.6	+32.6
Liberal Democrats	Akm Mahibur Rahman	274	12.1	−0.1
Independent	Vijay Parthiban	163	7.2	+7.2
Conservative	Mohamadu Faheem	104	4.6	−4.7
Green	Joe Oteng	103	4.5	−2.7
Majority		146	6.4	
Turnout		2,266		
Labour hold		Swing		

The by-election was called following the resignation of Cllr Elizabeth Booker.

Plaistow South by-election, 18 September 2025
Party	Candidate	Votes	%	±%
Newham Independents	Nazrul Islam	913	44.7	+44.7
Labour	Asheem Singh	436	21.4	−34.0
Reform	Lazar Monu	329	16.1	+16.1
Green	Nic Motte	152	7.4	−8.4
Conservative	Rois Miah	123	6.0	−11.5
Liberal Democrats	Sheree Miller	90	4.4	−6.9
Majority		487	23.3	
Turnout		2,059		
NIP gain from Labour				

The by-election was called following the death of Cllr Neil Wilson.
