= 2026 Newham mayoral election =

Local election in England

- 7 May 2026

The Mayor of Newham
- Turnout: 34.6% (▲6.6 pp)
| | First party | Second party | Third party |
|---|---|---|---|
| Candidate | Forhad Hussain | Mehmood Mirza | Areeq Chowdhury |
| Party | Labour | NIP | Green |
| Last election | 56.2% | 8.5% (Note: Newham Independents leader Mehmood Mirza stood as an independent in the 2022 mayoral election prior to forming the group.) | 11.0% |
| Popular vote | 25,538 | 20,234 | 18,999 |
| Percentage | 30.4% | 24.1% | 22.6% |
| Swing | ▼25.8 pp | ▲15.6 pp | ▲11.6 pp |
| | Fourth party | Fifth party |
| Candidate | Clive Furness | Terri Bloore |
| Party | Reform | Conservative |
| Last election | Did not stand | 11.6% |
| Popular vote | 7,313 | 6,360 |
| Percentage | 8.7% | 7.6% |
| Swing | | ▼4 pp |
Mayor before election
Rokhsana Fiaz
Labour Co-op
Mayor
Forhad Hussain
Labour

The 2026 Newham mayoral election was held on 7 May 2026 to elect the mayor of Newham, on the same date as the Newham local council election and other local elections across the country.

Forhad Hussain was elected Mayor of Newham for the first time. Labour retained the mayoralty, albeit with a significantly reduced majority.

== Background ==
The position of Mayor of Newham was established in 1965 as a ceremonial role and was given political powers in 2002. Robin Wales of the Labour Party won the mayoral elections in 2002, 2006, 2010, and 2014; he was succeeded by fellow Labour mayor Rokhsana Fiaz in the 2018 and 2022 elections. Wales subsequently joined Reform UK after leaving office. Fiaz announced in July 2025 that she would not be re-standing for election.

== Electoral system ==
The election uses the voting system of first past the post to elect the mayor, having been changed from the supplementary vote system in 2022. In first past the post, there is only one count, and the candidate with the most votes wins. The Electoral Reform Society described the move to first past the post as one lowering the bar for politicians and thus damaging British democracy.

== Candidates ==
The mayoral election had eight candidates. The Green Party and Newham Independents were seen as the biggest challengers to Labour.

== Results ==
2026 Newham mayoral election
| Party | Candidate | Votes | % | ±% |
|---|---|---|---|---|
| Labour | Forhad Hussain | 25,538 | 30.4 | ▼25.8 |
| NIP | Mehmood Mirza | 20,234 | 24.1 | ▲15.6 |
| Green | Areeq Chowdhury | 18,999 | 22.6 | ▲11.6 |
| Reform | Clive Furness | 7,313 | 8.7 | New |
| Conservative | Terri Bloore | 6,360 | 7.6 | ▼4.0 |
| Liberal Democrats | Laura Claire Willoughby | 3,766 | 4.5 | ▼1.1 |
| CPA | Bharath Swamy | 1,550 | 1.8 | ▼2.0 |
| Communities United | Kamran Malik | 324 | 0.4 | New |
| Turnout | | 84,762 | 34.9 | |
| Rejected ballots | | 669 | | |
| Registered electors | | 242,828 | | |
