= 2026 Newham London Borough Council election =

2026 English local government election

- 7 May 2026

All 66 seats to Newham London Borough Council 34 seats needed for a majority
- Registered: 242,828
- Turnout: 84,742; 34.9% (▲6.1%)
	First party	Second party	Third party
Leader	Forhad Hussain (Note: Mayor.)	Mehmood Mirza	Nate Higgins
Party	Labour	NIP	Green
Last election	64 seats, 61.5%	Did not exist	2 seats, 16.7%
Seats before	56	4	3
Seats won	26	24	16
Seat change	▼38	▲24	▲14
Popular vote	63,234	59,727	54,238
Percentage	28.9%	27.3%	24.8%
Swing	▼32.6pp	New	▲8.1pp
- Map of the results of the 2026 Newham Council election. Labour Party in red, Green Party in green & Newham Independents Party in yellow.
Mayor before election
Rokhsana Fiaz
Labour Co-op
Mayor after election
Forhad Hussain
Labour

The 2026 Newham London Borough Council election took place on 7 May 2026, as part of the 2026 United Kingdom local elections. All 66 members of Newham London Borough Council were elected; the 2026 Newham mayoral election was held on the same date to elect the council's leader. The election took place alongside the local elections in the other London boroughs.

Prior to the election, Labour had held both the mayoralty and a majority of the seats on the council. Labour's Forhad Hussain retained the mayoralty for the party at the associated mayoral election, taking over from the incumbent Labour mayor Rokhsana Fiaz, who did not stand for re-election. At the council election, Labour narrowly remained the largest party but lost its majority, leaving the council under no overall control. Local party the Newham Independents Party and the Green Party both made significant gains at Labour's expense.

== Background ==
=== History ===
Result of the 2022 council election

The thirty-two London boroughs were established in 1965 by the London Government Act 1963. They are the principal authorities in Greater London and have responsibilities including education, housing, planning, highways, social services, libraries, recreation, waste, environmental health and revenue collection. Some of the powers are shared with the Greater London Authority, which also manages passenger transport, police and fire.

Newham has been under Labour control since its creation, besides a period of no overall control from 1968 to 1971. In the most recent election in 2022, Labour won 64 seats with 61.2% of the vote across the borough, whilst the Green Party of England and Wales received two seats with 19.9% of the vote. The Labour candidate Rokhsana Fiaz was reelected as mayor of Newham in the concurrent mayoral election.

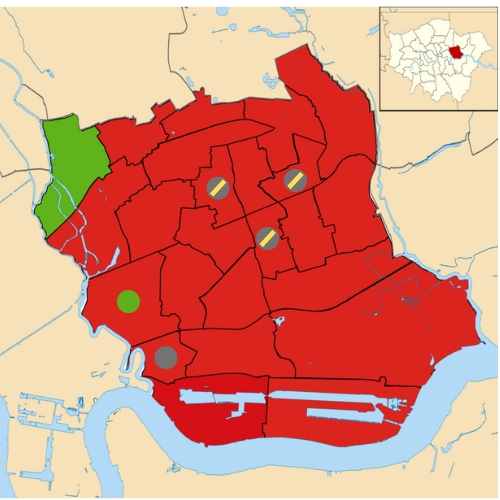
Newham as of 4 July 2024

== Electoral process ==
Newham, like other London borough councils, elects all of its councillors once every four years. The previous election took place in 2022. The election took place by multi-member first-past-the-post voting, with each ward being represented by two or three councillors. Electors had as many votes as there are councillors to be elected in their ward, with the top two or three being elected.

All registered electors (British, Irish, Commonwealth and European Union citizens) living in London aged 18 or over were entitled to vote in the election. People who live at two addresses in different councils, such as university students with different term-time and holiday addresses, were entitled to be registered for and vote in elections in both local authorities. Voting in-person at polling stations took place from 7:00 to 22:00 on election day, and voters were able to apply for postal votes or proxy votes in advance of the election.

== Previous council composition ==
After 2022 election		Before 2026 election		After 2026 election	
Party	Seats	Party	Seats	Party	Seats
Labour	64	Labour	56	Labour	26
Green	2	NIP	4	NIP	24
		Green	3	Green	16
		Independent	3		

Changes 2022–2026:

- May 2022: Belgica Guana (Labour Co-op) suspended from party
- May 2023: Cecilia Welsh and Luke Charters (Labour) resign – by-elections held July 2023
- July 2023:
  - Mehmood Mirza (independent) gains by-election from Labour
  - Stephanie Garfield (Labour) holds by-election
- October 2023: Daniel Lee-Phakoe (Labour) resigns – by-election held November 2023
- November 2023:
  - Zuber Gulamussen (Labour) leaves party sit as an independent under Newham Independents group
  - Sophia Naqvi (independent) gains by-election from Labour under Newham Independents group
- May 2024: Sasha Das Gupta, Ken Penton, and James Asser (Labour) resign – by-elections held July 2024
- June 2024:
  - Newham Independents Party formed – Mehmood Mirza, Zuber Gulamussen, and Sophia Naqvi (independent) join party
  - Elizabeth Booker (Labour) resigns – by-election held July 2024
- July 2024:
  - Areeq Chowdhury (Labour) defects to Green Party
  - Liz Cronin, Melanie Onovo, Blossom Young, and Aktharul Alam (Labour) win by-elections
- May 2025: Lewis Godfrey (Labour Co-op) leaves party to sit as an independent
- July 2025: Neil Wilson (Labour Co-op) dies – by-election held September 2025
- September 2025: Md Nazrul Islam (NIP) gains by-election from Labour
- November 2025: Nur Begum (Labour) defects to Newham Independents Party
- January 2026: Nur Begum (NIP) leaves party to sit as an independent

== Results summary ==
Council composition after the 2022 election

Council composition after the 2026 election

2026 Newham London Borough Council election
Party	Candidates	Seats	Gains	Losses	Net gain/loss	Seats %	Votes %	Votes	+/−
Labour	66	26	0	38	▼38	39.4%	28.9%	63,234	▼32.6pp
NIP	66	24	24	0	▲24	36.4%	27.3%	59,727	New
Green	66	16	14	0	▲14	24.2%	24.8%	54,238	▲8.1pp
Conservative	66	0	0	0	Steady	0.0%	8.6%	18,895	▼5.6pp
Reform	37	0	0	0	Steady	0.0%	5.4%	11,771	▲5.3pp
Liberal Democrats	23	0	0	0	Steady	0.0%	2.0%	4,317	▼0.9pp
Independent	14	0	0	0	Steady	0.0%	1.8%	3,970	▼0.2pp
CPA	18	0	0	0	Steady	0.0%	1.1%	2,438	▼0.9pp
Workers Party	1	0	0	0	Steady	0.0%	0.04%	95	New
TUSC	2	0	0	0	Steady	0.0%	0.04%	94	▼0.5pp
Communities United	1	0	0	0	Steady	0.0%	0.02%	40	New
Turnout		84,742	34.9						
Rejected ballots		599							
Total valid votes		84,143							
Total ballots		218,819							
Registered electors		242,828							

== Ward results ==
=== Beckton ===
Beckton (3 seats)
Party	Candidate	Votes	%	±%
Labour	Syed Ahmed	1,033	30.8	
Labour	Tonii Wilson	900	26.8	
Labour	Blossom Young	831	24.8	
NIP	Mohammed Ahmed	739	22.0	
Green	Heather Green	687	20.5	
NIP	Shahzad Abbasi	683	20.4	
Green	Deyan Atanasov	628	18.7	
Green	Tony Challinor	623	18.6	
NIP	Afusatu Adedapo	618	18.4	
Reform	Lazar Monu	601	17.9	
Conservative	Aditya Kadle	299	8.9	
Liberal Democrats	Ramona-Lavinia Elvin	270	8.0	
CPA	June Taylor	235	7.0	
Conservative	Mohammed Karim	221	6.6	
Conservative	Sidy Kounta	213	6.3	
TUSC	Lois Austin	62	1.8	
TUSC	Angharad Hillier	32	1.0	
Turnout		3,382	30.3	+2.5
Rejected ballots		26		
Registered electors		11,167		
Labour hold		Swing		
Labour hold		Swing		
Labour hold		Swing		

=== Boleyn ===
Boleyn (3 seats)
Party	Candidate	Votes	%	±%
NIP	Mehmood Mirza	1,856	40.3	
NIP	Muhammad Aziz	1,677	36.4	
NIP	Moniba Khan	1,555	33.7	
Labour	Rabbir Hassain	1452	31.5	
Labour	Halim Bepari	1155	25.1	
Labour	Sheila Poleon	902	19.6	
Green	Kerena Fussell	847	18.4	
Green	Ariful Molla	805	17.5	
Green	Helen Lynch	794	17.2	
Conservative	Mark Bromley	437	9.5	
Conservative	Charles Meaby	354	7.7	
Conservative	Silvia Troanta	336	7.3	
Reform	Karl McWilton	261	5.7	
Liberal Democrats	Sheree Miller	175	3.8	
CPA	Simon Gibson	133	2.9	
CPA	Leela Vitnam	78	1.7	
CPA	Venkat Vabanagiri	66	1.4	
Turnout		4,632	43.0	+12.70
Rejected ballots		23		
Registered electors		10,763		
NIP gain from Labour		Swing		
NIP gain from Labour		Swing		
NIP gain from Labour		Swing		

=== Canning Town North ===
Canning Town North (3 seats)
Party	Candidate	Votes	%	±%
Labour	Aleya Hussain	706	31.2	
Green	Imogen Anderson	651	28.8	
Labour	Shaban Mohammed	632	27.9	
Labour	Larisa Zilickaja	524	23.1	
Green	Nicolas Motte	484	21.4	
NIP	Mohammed Hussain	481	21.2	
NIP	Ibrahim Hussein	409	18.1	
NIP	Zulfiqar Ahmed	384	17.0	
Green	Gowry Paraneeharan	372	16.4	
Reform	Samir Raheem	364	16.1	
Conservative	Bryan Houston	272	12.0	
Liberal Democrats	Robert Claeson	213	9.4	
Conservative	Aminul Islam	142	6.3	
CPA	Goodness Nkire	129	5.7	
CPA	Precious Nkire	120	5.3	
Conservative	Redawanur Rahman	112	4.9	
Turnout		2,282	31.3	+4.4
Rejected ballots		18		
Registered electors		7,301		
Labour hold		Swing		
Green gain from Labour		Swing		
Labour hold		Swing		

=== Canning Town South ===
Canning Town South (3 seats)
Party	Candidate	Votes	%	±%
Labour Co-op	Aderonke Benson	507	26.7	
Labour Co-op	Rohit K. Dasgupta	474	24.9	
Labour Co-op	John Morris	457	24.0	
Green	Alex Cline	454	23.9	
Green	James Reilly	414	21.8	
Green	Abdul Saud	341	17.9	
NIP	Abdur Rahim	301	15.8	
Reform	Ahrash Dianat	283	14.9	
Independent	Amir Ali	279	14.7	
NIP	Syed Hayder	274	14.4	
Conservative	Luke Black	263	13.8	
NIP	Feven Yohannes	244	12.8	
Conservative	Maria Khan	188	9.9	
Conservative	Ahmed Faqai	140	7.4	
Independent	Linda Jordan	137	7.2	
Liberal Democrats	Syed Alam	119	6.3	
Independent	Belgica Guana	111	5.8	
CPA	Myrtle Laing	94	4.9	
CPA	Prossy Namwanje	60	3.2	
Turnout		1,916	31.1	+8.3
Rejected ballots		15		
Registered electors		6,152		
Labour hold		Swing		
Labour hold		Swing		
Labour hold		Swing		

=== Custom House ===
Custom House (3 seats)
Party	Candidate	Votes	%	±%
Labour Co-op	Heather Lafferty	1,047	29.4	
Labour Co-op	Thelma Odoi	946	26.6	
Labour Co-op	Simon Rush	848	23.8	
Green	Tony Mehegan	771	21.7	
Green	Ben Moss	693	19.5	
Green	Raphael Smith	672	18.9	
NIP	Wazed Ali	646	18.1	
Reform	Ben Tiley	643	18.1	
NIP	Zafer Felek	512	14.4	
NIP	Chandrika Wijesinghe	426	12.0	
Independent	Badrul Islam	343	9.6	
Conservative	Tim Roll-Pickering	341	9.6	
Conservative	Rustam Buck	303	8.5	
Conservative	Rois Miah	262	7.4	
Independent	Mushtaq Mughal	258	7.2	
Liberal Democrats	Alexander Tuppen	244	6.9	
CPA	Idiat Lawal	201	5.6	
Independent	James Mudd	189	5.3	
CPA	Suze Gurmeseva	187	5.3	
Turnout		3,591	31.3	+8.1
Rejected ballots		31		
Registered electors		11,470		
Labour hold		Swing		
Labour hold		Swing		
Labour hold		Swing		

=== East Ham ===
East Ham (3 seats)
Party	Candidate	Votes	%	±%
NIP	Abdul Halim	1,674	40.0	
NIP	Begum Sahera	1,561	37.3	
NIP	Syed Naqvi	1,376	32.9	
Labour	Mukesh Patel	1,064	25.4	
Labour	Aisha Siddiqah	1,035	24.7	
Labour	Sofia Patel	1,024	24.5	
Green	Andrew Diver	963	23.0	
Green	Nina Schlautmann	816	19.5	
Green	Nuruzzaman Khan	813	19.4	
Conservative	Maria Aktar	456	10.9	
Reform	Hiren Nakum	352	8.4	
Conservative	Ahamed Shabber	345	8.2	
Conservative	Jahangir Sikder	298	7.1	
Workers Party	Wasim Hussain	95	2.3	
Turnout		4,211	37.8	+7
Rejected ballots		29		
Registered electors		11,141		
NIP gain from Labour		Swing		
NIP gain from Labour		Swing		
NIP gain from Labour		Swing		

=== East Ham South ===
East Ham South (3 seats)
Party	Candidate	Votes	%	±%
Labour	Sanawar Hussain	1,322	28.4	
Labour	Susan Masters	1,143	24.5	
Labour	Lakmini Shah	1,103	23.7	
NIP	Mohammad Bhuyan	1,067	22.9	
NIP	Asad Shan	1,040	22.3	
NIP	Abdul Abdulbari	1,030	22.1	
Independent	Kamal Hussain	960	20.6	
Independent	Suhel Rob	908	19.5	
Green	Tasnim Khan	841	18.0	
Green	Paula Reily	815	17.5	
Green	Charan Namaia	691	14.8	
Reform	Danny Collingwood	492	10.6	
Reform	Noel McMahon	425	9.1	
Reform	Nigel Williams	422	9.1	
Conservative	Royal Ahmed	254	5.5	
Conservative	Udeshwar Singh	252	5.4	
Liberal Democrats	James Shears	198	4.2	
Conservative	Abdus Talukder	193	4.1	
Turnout		4,690	39.3	+8.4
Rejected ballots		30		
Registered electors		11,935		
Labour hold		Swing		
Labour hold		Swing		
Labour hold		Swing		

=== Forest Gate North ===
Forest Gate North (2 seats)
Party	Candidate	Votes	%	±%
Green	Matthew Carlile	1,145	36.0	
Labour Co-op	Rachel Tripp	1,092	34.4	
Labour Co-op	Liz Cronin	1,051	33.1	
Green	Shofa Miah	981	30.9	
NIP	Walid Rahman	659	20.7	
NIP	Roy Wenborne	386	12.1	
Reform	Rachel Evans	209	6.6	
Reform	Lesley Macdonald	174	5.5	
Conservative	Matthew Cresswell	168	5.3	
Liberal Democrats	Jenny Chang	146	4.6	
Conservative	Malcolm Madden	116	3.6	
Turnout		3,189	41.5	+8.8
Rejected ballots		10		
Registered electors		7,688		
Green gain from Labour		Swing		
Labour hold		Swing		

=== Forest Gate South ===
Forest Gate South (3 seats)
Party	Candidate	Votes	%	±%
Green	Arshan Baskaran	1,522	34.2	
Green	Zahra Kheyre	1,447	32.5	
Green	Jack Pickard	1,429	32.1	
Labour	Aktharul Alam	1,311	29.4	
Labour	Robert Carter-Lennox	1,185	26.6	
Labour	Helen Page	1,185	26.6	
NIP	Zakaria Bhariwala	913	20.5	
NIP	Sabrin Hoque	860	19.3	
NIP	Kashif Raja	849	19.1	
Conservative	Ellis Hudson	281	6.3	
Reform	Mavin Patel	277	6.2	
Conservative	Ketema Ayano	271	6.1	
Liberal Democrats	David Terrar	246	5.5	
Independent	Muhammad Asim	198	4.4	
Conservative	Chabane Mahrane	188	4.2	
Independent	Mohammad Khan	163	3.7	
Liberal Democrats	Jazmine Whomes	131	2.9	
Independent	Sohail Jamal	110	2.5	
Turnout		4,490	36.8	+9.3
Rejected ballots		38		
Registered electors		12,190		
Green gain from Labour		Swing		
Green gain from Labour		Swing		
Green gain from Labour		Swing		

=== Green Street East ===
Green Street East (3 seats)
Party	Candidate	Votes	%	±%
NIP	Zakir Hossain	1,541	36.0	
NIP	Sunny Chowdhury	1,454	34.0	
Labour	Rohima Rahman	1,409	32.9	
NIP	Parvez Sheikh	1,313	30.7	
Labour	Miraj Patel	1,308	30.6	
Labour	Hafiz Rasool	1,168	27.3	
Green	Steven Braines	799	18.7	
Green	Hilary Hudson	727	17.0	
Green	Awais Sikandar	587	13.7	
Conservative	Kirankumar Patel	483	11.3	
Reform	Ankita Kita	335	7.8	
Conservative	Anowarul Islam	330	7.7	
Conservative	Haroon Mohammed Khatun	325	7.6	
Turnout		4,307	38.2	+3.5
Rejected ballots		30		
Registered electors		11,274		
NIP gain from Labour		Swing		
NIP gain from Labour		Swing		
Labour hold		Swing		

=== Green Street West ===
Green Street West (3 seats)
Party	Candidate	Votes	%	±%
NIP	Idris Ibrahim	1,647	43.3	
NIP	Rumana Liza	1,446	38.0	
NIP	Qasim Yaseen	1,377	36.2	
Labour	Hanif Abdulmuhit	1169	30.7	
Labour	Mohammed Gani	1056	27.7	
Labour	Sangeeta Slawson	901	23.7	
Green	Rachel Humphrey	706	18.5	
Green	Huzayfa Patel	605	15.9	
Green	Ada Stone	521	13.7	
Conservative	Ravindra Nandivelugu	259	6.8	
Conservative	Joerd Hysa	250	6.6	
Conservative	Peter Ujiagbe	247	6.5	
Reform	Nirali Gor	222	5.8	
Reform	Dick Jones	215	5.6	
Reform	Slav Donev	200	5.3	
Turnout		3,834	37.1	+4.2
Rejected ballots		26		
Registered electors		10,342		
NIP gain from Labour		Swing		
NIP gain from Labour		Swing		
NIP gain from Labour		Swing		

=== Little Ilford ===
Little Ilford (3 seats)
Party	Candidate	Votes	%	±%
NIP	Tahir Mirza	1,762	39.9	
NIP	Oli Rahman	1,641	37.2	
NIP	Nasreen Shamima	1,589	36.0	
Labour	Musawwar Alam	1,497	33.9	
Labour	Abul Syed	1,358	30.7	
Labour	Sharon Chawda	1,343	30.4	
Green	Freya Coakley	734	16.6	
Green	Francis Ho	639	14.5	
Green	Ian McClelland	603	13.7	
Conservative	Mahbu Bullah	251	5.7	
Reform	Janet Hill	235	5.3	
Reform	Andy Dumitriuc	229	5.2	
Conservative	Saverimuthu Mariadas	194	4.4	
Conservative	Showkat Osman	187	4.2	
CPA	Pauline Rose	135	3.1	
Liberal Democrats	Sinan Ozdemir	109	2.5	
CPA	Peter Murengera	93	2.1	
CPA	Samuel Kazibwe	90	2.0	
Turnout		4,452	36.9	+4
Rejected ballots		35		
Registered electors		12,080		
NIP gain from Labour		Swing		
NIP gain from Labour		Swing		
NIP gain from Labour		Swing		

=== Manor Park ===
Manor Park (3 seats)
Party	Candidate	Votes	%	±%
Labour	Imam Haque	1,448	35.2	
Labour	Salema Khatun	1,418	34.5	
Labour	Salim Patel	1,324	32.2	
NIP	Badol Rahman	1,174	28.6	
NIP	Sabir Banglawala	1,067	25.9	
Green	Sarah Burton	991	24.1	
NIP	Mujeebur Rehman	979	23.8	
Green	Rajeev Kumar	779	18.9	
Green	George Salomon	763	18.6	
Conservative	Somrat Saymon	457	11.1	
Conservative	Ashraf Ahmed	360	8.8	
Conservative	Vasuki Muruhathas	262	6.4	
Reform	Lesley Hopkins	222	5.4	
Reform	Dean Muroe	201	4.9	
Reform	Marie Fenech	200	4.9	
Liberal Democrats	Derek Jackson	184	4.5	
Turnout		4,145	38.1	+5.1
Rejected ballots		33		
Registered electors		10,873		
Labour hold		Swing		
Labour hold		Swing		
Labour hold		Swing		

=== Maryland ===
Maryland (2 seats)
Party	Candidate	Votes	%	±%
Green	Kelly Drake	1,101	38.7	
Green	Ren Tilbury	797	28.0	
Labour	Reece McMahon	785	27.6	
Labour	Melanie Onovo	720	25.3	
NIP	Mohammad Hossain	563	19.8	
NIP	Titus Essel	436	15.3	
Reform	Neil Docking	244	8.6	
Reform	Betsie Lee	225	7.9	
Liberal Democrats	James Jones	144	5.1	
Conservative	John Lovatt	138	4.9	
Conservative	Tai Durojaiye	135	4.8	
Turnout		2,860	33.5	+6.5
Rejected ballots		18		
Registered electors		8,543		
Green gain from Labour		Swing		
Green gain from Labour		Swing		

=== Plaistow North ===
Plaistow North (3 seats)
Party	Candidate	Votes	%	±%
NIP	Sophia Naqvi	1,484	38.3	
NIP	Nizam Ali	1,245	32.2	
Labour	Zulfiqar Ali	1,158	29.9	
Labour	Pervez Qureshi	1,151	29.7	
NIP	Mohmed Pathan	1,094	28.3	
Labour	Joy Laguda	999	25.8	
Green	Zeshan Adil	765	19.8	
Green	George Acquaah	719	18.6	
Green	Graham Taylor Burge	656	16.9	
Conservative	Terri Bloore	349	9.0	
Reform	Faysel Alam	228	5.9	
Reform	Ella Monu	219	5.7	
Conservative	Amanjit Singh	199	5.1	
Conservative	Murad Chowdhury	192	5.0	
CPA	Paul Jobson	156	4.0	
Liberal Democrats	Gulsun Zekai	136	3.5	
Communities United	Ahmad Saeed	40	1.0	
Turnout		3,894	33.7	+5.3
Rejected ballots		23		
Registered electors		11,560		
NIP gain from Labour		Swing		
NIP gain from Labour		Swing		
Labour hold		Swing		

=== Plaistow South ===
Plaistow South (3 seats)
Party	Candidate	Votes	%	±%
NIP	Nazrul Islam	1,063	33.8	
NIP	Tamzied Khan	925	29.4	
NIP	Obaid Khan	923	29.4	
Labour	Rubi Begum	797	25.3	
Green	Pippa King	671	21.3	
Labour	Jane Lofthouse	640	20.4	
Green	Herbert Leonelli	578	18.4	
Green	Alin Petcu	510	16.2	
Labour	Asheem Singh	449	14.3	
Reform	Gabriel Constantin	432	13.7	
Conservative	Mohammed Alam Begum	403	12.8	
Reform	Ivaylo Kanev	334	10.6	
Conservative	Atiqur Rahman	249	7.9	
Conservative	Akmol Hussain	202	6.4	
CPA	Kocotchy Tchesse	191	6.1	
Liberal Democrats	Frederik Grunta	145	4.6	
Independent	Shazia Anjum	102	3.2	
Turnout		3,176	35.5	+7.2
Rejected ballots		32		
Registered electors		8,938		
NIP gain from Labour		Swing		
NIP gain from Labour		Swing		
NIP gain from Labour		Swing		

=== Plaistow West and Canning Town East ===
Plaistow West and Canning Town East (3 seats)
Party	Candidate	Votes	%	±%
Labour Co-op	Shantu Ferdous	1,112	31.0	
Labour Co-op	Robert Gordon	1,062	29.6	
Labour Co-op	Madeleine Sarley Pontin	942	26.3	
NIP	Saiful Islam	925	25.8	
Green	Ben Beeler	900	25.1	
Green	Karen Flanagan	852	23.8	
NIP	Abdul Chaudhari	768	21.4	
NIP	Syeda Tariq	768	21.4	
Green	Susha Sooral	705	19.7	
Reform	Constantin Ladan	596	16.6	
Conservative	Benedetto Litteri	351	9.8	
Conservative	Rajan Miah	259	7.2	
Conservative	Misrak Tefra	200	5.6	
Independent	Shayne Wiskin	159	4.4	
Turnout		3,622	31.7	−3.4
Rejected ballots		36		
Registered electors		11,437		
Labour hold		Swing		
Labour hold		Swing		
Labour hold		Swing		

=== Plashet ===
Plashet (2 seats)
Party	Candidate	Votes	%	±%
NIP	Zuber Gulamussen	1,547	48.8	
NIP	Ilyas Sharif	1,454	45.9	
Labour	Zakir Rahim	677	21.4	
Labour	Jennifer Bailey	662	20.9	
Green	Katy Clarke	475	15.0	
Green	Tim Kiely	429	13.5	
Conservative	Ram Saravanan	348	11.0	
Conservative	Khatija Meaby	182	5.7	
Reform	Kate Bettell	172	5.4	
Liberal Democrats	Christian Moon	96	3.0	
Turnout		3,189	40.2	+5.1
Rejected ballots		21		
Registered electors		7,939		
NIP gain from Labour		Swing		
NIP gain from Labour		Swing		

=== Royal Albert ===
Royal Albert (2 seats)
Party	Candidate	Votes	%	±%
Labour Co-op	Ann Easter	602	29.2	
Green	Poojitha Konkati	531	25.7	
Labour Co-op	Anthony McAlmont	529	25.6	
Green	Kia Summers	492	23.8	
Reform	Daniel Oxley	408	19.8	
NIP	Ziyan Pathan	216	10.5	
NIP	Faruque Sikder	204	9.9	
Liberal Democrats	James Alan-Rumsby	203	9.8	
Conservative	Nadia Sukander	195	9.5	
Liberal Democrats	Jason Wilkinson	165	8.0	
Conservative	Palmira Taran	149	7.2	
Turnout		2,080	28.7	+7.3
Rejected ballots		17		
Registered electors		7,256		
Labour hold		Swing		
Green gain from Labour		Swing		

=== Royal Victoria ===
Royal Victoria (2 seats)
Party	Candidate	Votes	%	±%
Green	Rob Callender	1,384	46.9	
Green	Shabd Pyari	1,056	35.8	
Labour	Steve Brayshaw	715	24.2	
Labour	Caroline Oladapo	572	19.4	
Reform	Kevin Okparaeke	405	13.7	
Conservative	Bradley Fage	394	13.3	
Conservative	George Wright	340	11.5	
Liberal Democrats	Richard East	295	10.0	
NIP	Ehsan Mughal	171	5.8	
NIP	Tomek Zygarowski	156	5.3	
Turnout		2,968	26.7	+6.6
Rejected ballots		15		
Registered electors		11,112		
Green gain from Labour		Swing		
Green gain from Labour		Swing		

=== Stratford ===
Stratford (3 seats)
Party	Candidate	Votes	%	±%
Green	Chae Ho Hwang	1,428	45.5	
Green	Danny Keeling	1,381	44.0	
Green	Sonia Quintero	1,357	43.2	
Labour Co-op	James Beckles	889	28.3	
Labour Co-op	Sabia Kamali	773	24.6	
Labour Co-op	Femi Falola	765	24.4	
NIP	Shohel Alam	343	10.9	
NIP	Naimul Islam	315	10.0	
Conservative	Nitin John Thomas	280	8.9	
Liberal Democrats	Samie Dorgham	279	8.9	
Reform	Alfie Mosely	274	8.7	
NIP	Maksudul Haque	261	8.3	
Conservative	Miral Amin	247	7.9	
Conservative	Jahangir Bhuiyan	205	6.5	
Independent	Lucrece Sainclair	53	1.7	
Turnout		3,161	29.7	+6.9
Rejected ballots		23		
Registered electors		10,635		
Green gain from Labour		Swing		
Green gain from Labour		Swing		
Green gain from Labour		Swing		

=== Stratford Olympic Park ===
Stratford Olympic Park (2 seats)
Party	Candidate	Votes	%	±%
Green	Nate Higgins	1,696	64.6	
Green	Joe Hudson-Small	1,483	56.5	
Labour	Darren Mason	450	17.1	
Labour	Rachael Osei-Temeng	410	15.6	
Liberal Democrats	Laura Willoughby	166	6.3	
Reform	Jonathan Baxter	156	5.9	
NIP	Dilshad Ali	138	5.3	
Conservative	Vijaya Dave	123	4.7	
Liberal Democrats	Robert Briggs	121	4.6	
NIP	Vaishali Shah	110	4.2	
Conservative	Rachel Nabudde	102	3.9	
Reform	Rabindranauth Ramday	96	3.7	
Turnout		2,639	31.4	−2.5
Rejected ballots		13		
Registered electors		8,414		
Green hold		Swing		
Green hold		Swing		

=== Wall End ===
Wall End (3 seats)
Party	Candidate	Votes	%	±%
NIP	Kumar Anand	1,392	29.6	
NIP	Muhammad Majeed	1,368	29.1	
NIP	Noman Abu	1,268	27.0	
Labour	Jose Alexander	1,144	24.4	
Labour	Lester Hudson	977	20.8	
Labour	Carole Shaw	922	19.6	
Conservative	Ki Nathan	876	18.7	
Conservative	Durai Kannan	836	17.8	
Green	Rowan Fletcher	822	17.5	
Conservative	Vijay Parthiban	821	17.5	
Green	Amanda Mole	757	16.1	
Green	Paul Howell	722	15.4	
Reform	Faheem Mohamadu	606	12.9	
Liberal Democrats	Arunasalam Pirapaharan	209	4.4	
CPA	Victoria Bapu	165	3.5	
CPA	Bharath Swamy	153	3.3	
CPA	Jayanthi Dadi	152	3.2	
Turnout		4,735	39.6	+4.6
Rejected ballots		38		
Registered electors		11,957		
NIP gain from Labour		Swing		
NIP gain from Labour		Swing		
NIP gain from Labour		Swing		

=== West Ham ===
West Ham (3 seats)
Party	Candidate	Votes	%	±%
Labour Co-op	John Gray	1,114	34.0	
Green	Ibrahim Alom	1,037	31.6	
Labour Co-op	Adjoa Kwarteng	996	30.4	
Green	Deb Scott	991	30.2	
Labour Co-op	Sam Mannion	894	27.3	
Green	Kawsar Shirazul	790	24.1	
NIP	Karib Mostafa	469	14.3	
NIP	Mayra Crean	463	14.1	
NIP	Attia Bano	448	13.7	
Reform	Robert Constantin	411	12.5	
Reform	Andy Green	403	12.3	
Conservative	Fokoruddin Ahmed	327	10.0	
Liberal Democrats	Karina Celis Rangel	323	9.9	
Conservative	Armyn Hennessy	296	9.0	
Conservative	Manir Khan	187	5.7	
Turnout		3,297	30.9	+4.1
Rejected ballots		19		
Registered electors		10,661		
Labour hold		Swing		
Green gain from Labour		Swing		
Labour hold		Swing		
