= 2010 London local elections =

- 6 May 2010

All 1,861 on all 32 London boroughs
- Turnout: 62.0% (▲24.1%)
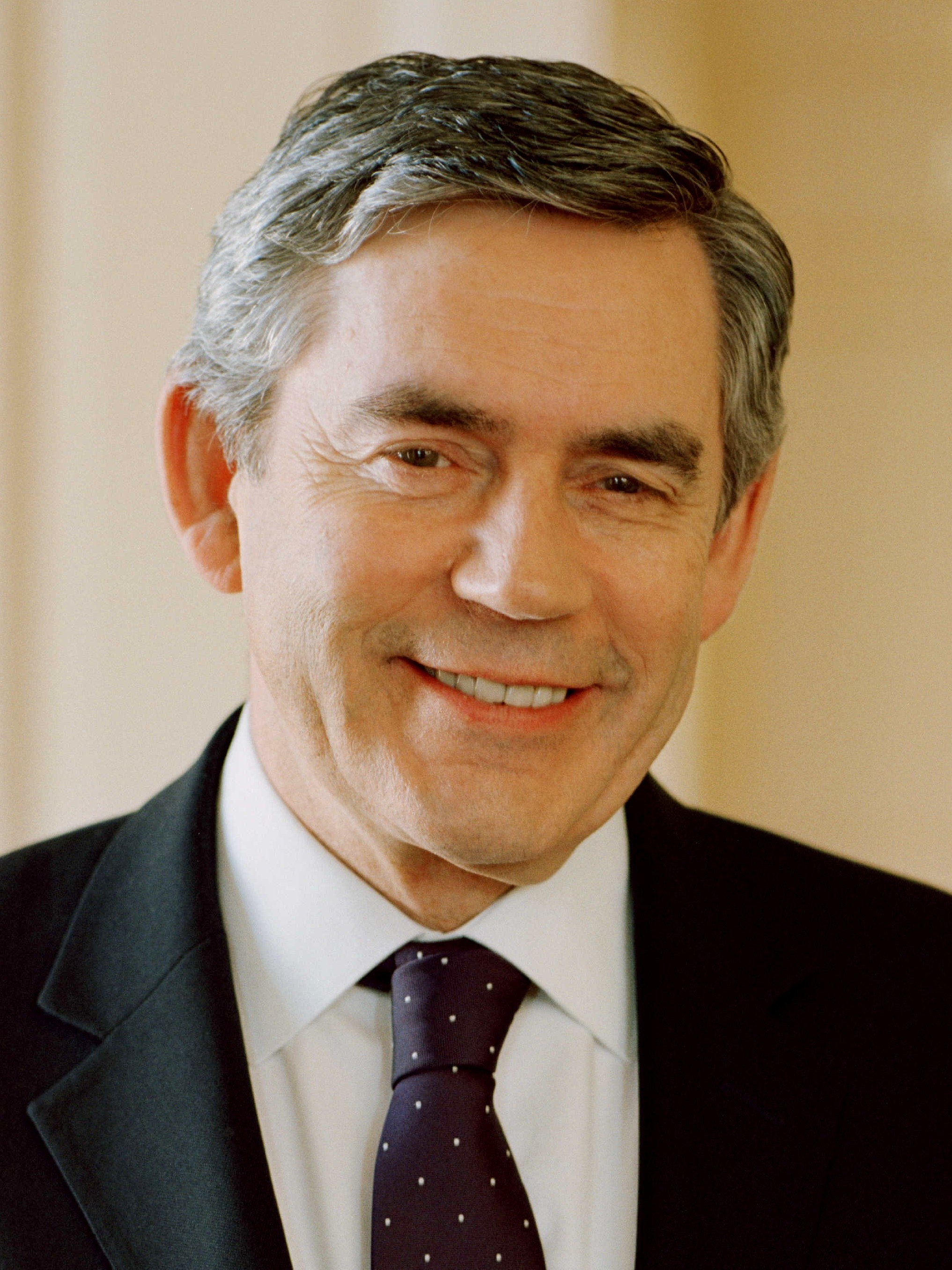

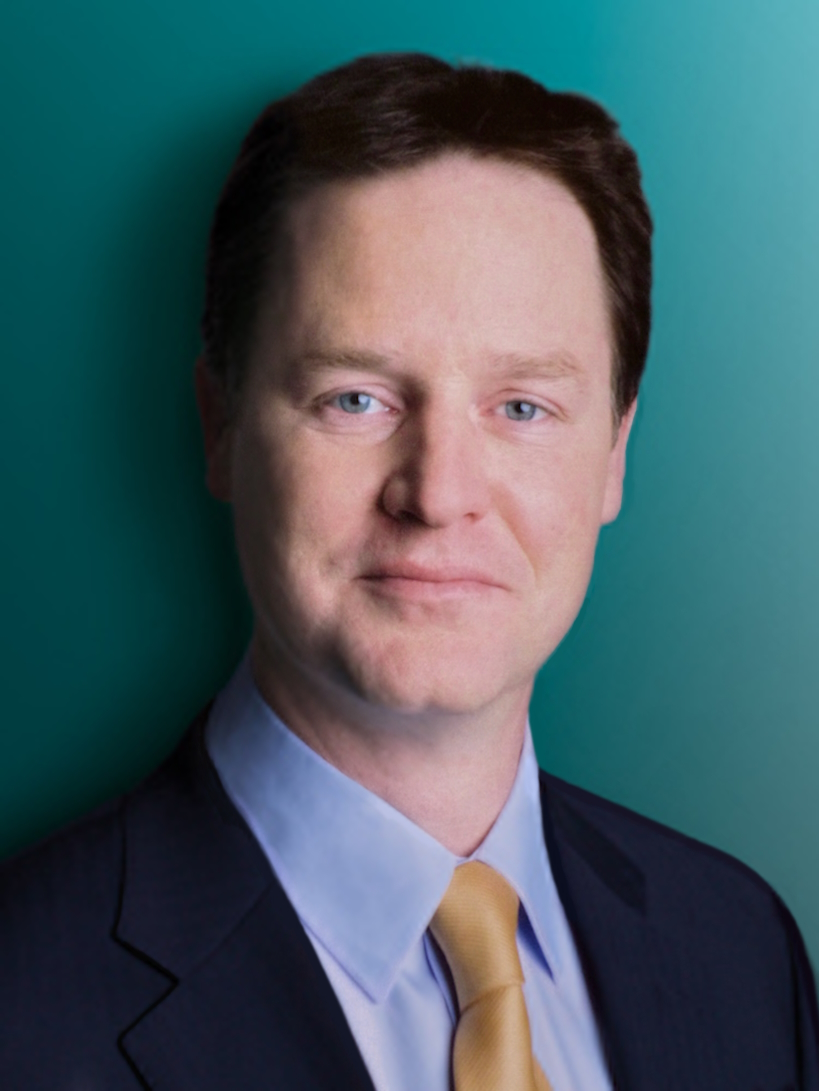
	First party	Second party	Third party
Leader	Gordon Brown	David Cameron	Nick Clegg
Party	Labour	Conservative	Liberal Democrats
Popular vote	1,213,983	1,184,352	835,217
Percentage	32.5%	31.7%	22.4%
Swing	▲4.6%	▼3.2%	▲1.7%
Councils	17	11	2
Councils +/–	▲10	▼3	▼1
Councillors	875	717	246
Councillors +/–	▲191	▼68	▼70
- London borough councils by political control following election. Councils that are Labour are in red, Conservative in blue, Liberal Democrat in yellow and no overall control in black.

Local government elections took place in London, and some other parts of the United Kingdom on Thursday 6 May 2010. Polling stations were open between 7am and 10pm.

Despite losing 6 Parliamentary seats in London in the General Election conducted on the same day, London Labour's share of the vote, council seats and control of Councils rose substantially. 10 councils swung to Labour control, and the party gained 190 council seats. Support for the London Conservatives in the capital declined by 3%, with the party losing 3 councils and 68 councillors. The London Liberal Democrats increased their vote share slightly but lost 70 councillors, as well as losing control of Richmond upon Thames council to the Conservatives.

The success of minor parties in the 2006 elections was not repeated, and the smaller parties were almost wiped out. The British National Party, Christian Peoples Alliance and Socialist Party lost all of their seats, while the London Green Party lost 10 of their 12 seats and Respect lost 14 out of 15. In total, 21 candidates from minor parties were elected, 43 fewer than in 2006.

All London borough council seats were up for election. Mayoral contests were also held in the London Boroughs of Hackney, Lewisham, and Newham. The previous Borough elections in London were in 2006.

== Results summary ==
Party	Votes won	% votes	Change	Seats	% seats	Change	Councils	Change
Labour	1,213,983	32.5	+4.6	875	47.0	+191	17	+10
Conservative	1,184,352	31.7	-3.2	717	38.5	-68	11	-3
Liberal Democrats	835,217	22.4	+1.7	246	13.2	-70	2	-1
Green	248,175	6.6	-1.3	2	0.1	-10	0	±0
Others	251,562	6.8	-1.8	21	1.1	-43	0	±0
No overall control	n/a	n/a	n/a	n/a	n/a	n/a	2	-6

- Turnout: 3,502,273 voters cast ballots, a turnout of 62.0% (+24.1%).

== Council results ==
Council	Previous control	Result	Details
Barking and Dagenham	Labour	Labour	Details
Barnet	Conservative	Conservative	Details
Bexley	Conservative	Conservative	Details
Brent	No overall control	Labour	Details
Bromley	Conservative	Conservative	Details
Camden	No overall control	Labour	Details
Croydon	Conservative	Conservative	Details
Ealing	Conservative	Labour	Details
Enfield	Conservative	Labour	Details
Greenwich	Labour	Labour	Details
Hackney	Labour	Labour	Details
Hammersmith and Fulham	Conservative	Conservative	Details
Haringey	Labour	Labour	Details
Harrow	Conservative	Labour	Details
Havering	Conservative	Conservative	Details
Hillingdon	Conservative	Conservative	Details
Hounslow	No overall control	Labour	Details
Islington	No overall control	Labour	Details
Kensington and Chelsea	Conservative	Conservative	Details
Kingston upon Thames	Liberal Democrats	Liberal Democrats	Details
Lambeth	Labour	Labour	Details
Lewisham	No overall control	Labour	Details
Merton	No overall control	No overall control	Details
Newham	Labour	Labour	Details
Redbridge	Conservative	No overall control	Details
Richmond upon Thames	Liberal Democrats	Conservative	Details
Southwark	No overall control	Labour	Details
Sutton	Liberal Democrats	Liberal Democrats	Details
Tower Hamlets	Labour	Labour	Details
Waltham Forest	No overall control	Labour	Details
Wandsworth	Conservative	Conservative	Details
Westminster	Conservative	Conservative	Details

== Mayoral results ==
In three London boroughs the executive function of the council is a directly elected mayor. The mayoral elections take place at the same time as councillor elections in those boroughs.

Mayoralty	2006	2010
Hackney	Jules Pipe (Labour)	Jules Pipe (Labour)
Lewisham	Sir Steve Bullock (Labour)	Sir Steve Bullock (Labour)
Newham	Robin Wales (Labour)	Robin Wales (Labour)

== Ward result maps ==
=== London-wide ===
The map below shows the results for each ward across the whole of Greater London.

2010 London local elections results map

=== By borough ===
Barking and Dagenham 2010 results map

Barnet 2010 results map

Bexley 2010 results map

Brent 2010 results map

Bromley 2010 results map

Camden 2010 results map

Croydon 2010 results map

Ealing 2010 results map

Enfield 2010 results map

Greenwich 2010 results map

Hackney 2010 results map

Hammersmith and Fulham 2010 results map

Haringey 2010 results map

Harrow 2010 results map

Havering 2010 results map

Hillingdon 2010 results map

Hounslow 2010 results map

Islington 2010 results map

Kensington and Chelsea 2010 results map

Kingston upon Thames 2010 results map

Lambeth 2010 results map

Lewisham 2010 results map

Merton 2010 results map

Newham 2010 results map

Redbridge 2010 results map

Richmond upon Thames 2010 results map

Southwark 2010 results map

Sutton 2010 results map

Tower Hamlets 2010 results map

Waltham Forest 2010 results map

Wandsworth 2010 results map

Westminster 2010 results map
