= East Ham (ward) =

Electoral ward in London, England

- Electoral ward for the Newham London Borough Council
- East Ham ward boundaries
- Borough: Newham
- County: Greater London
- Population: 16,071 (2021) (Note: 2021 Census data reported for 2022 ward boundaries)
- Electorate: 11,141 (2026)
- Major settlements: East Ham
- Area: 0.9884 square kilometres (0.3816 sq mi)

Current electoral ward
- Created: 2022
- Seats: 3
- Councillors: Abdul Halim; Begum Sahera; Syed Naqvi
- Created from: East Ham Central
- GSS code: E05013909

East Ham is an electoral wards in the London Borough of Newham. The ward was first used in the 2022 elections and elects three councillors to Newham London Borough Council.

== List of councillors ==
Seat	Councillor	Took office	Left office	Party	Election
1	Imam Haque	2022	2026	Labour	2022
2	Femi Falola	2022	2026	Labour	2022
3	Shantu Ferdous	2022	2026	Labour	2022
1	Abdul Halim	2026	Incumbent	NIP	2026
2	Begum Sahera	2026	Incumbent	NIP	2026
3	Syed Naqvi	2026	Incumbent	NIP	2026

== Newham council elections ==
The ward was created for the 2022 election from part of East Ham Central.

=== 2026 election ===
The election took place on 7 May 2026.

2026 Newham London Borough Council election: East Ham
Party	Candidate	Votes	%	±%
NIP	Abdul Halim	1,674	40.0	
NIP	Begum Sahera	1,561	37.3	
NIP	Syed Naqvi	1,376	32.9	
Labour	Mukesh Patel	1,064	25.4	
Labour	Aisha Siddiqah	1,035	24.7	
Labour	Sofia Patel	1,024	24.5	
Green	Andrew Diver	963	23.0	
Green	Nina Schlautmann	816	19.5	
Green	Nuruzzaman Khan	813	19.4	
Conservative	Maria Aktar	456	10.9	
Reform	Hiren Nakum	352	8.4	
Conservative	Ahamed Shabber	345	8.2	
Conservative	Jahangir Sikder	298	7.1	
Workers Party	Wasim Hussain	95	2.3	
Turnout		4,211	37.8	+7
Rejected ballots		29		
Registered electors		11,141		
NIP gain from Labour		Swing		
NIP gain from Labour		Swing		
NIP gain from Labour		Swing		

=== 2022 election ===
The election took place on 5 May 2022.

2022 Newham London Borough Council election: East Ham
Party	Candidate	Votes	%	±%
Labour	Imam Haque	1,725	64.0	N/A
Labour	Femi Falola	1,709	63.4	N/A
Labour	Shantu Ferdous	1,693	62.8	N/A
Conservative	Mohammad Faheem	703	26.1	N/A
Conservative	Nadim Miah	571	21.2	N/A
Conservative	Charles Meaby	526	19.5	N/A
Green	Timothy Boxall	446	16.6	N/A
Green	Madeleine Roberts	428	15.9	N/A
Green	Edoardo Toso	283	10.5	N/A
Turnout		3,028	30.8	N/A
Registered electors		9,819		
Labour win (new seat)				
Labour win (new seat)				
Labour win (new seat)				
