= Stratford Olympic Park =

Electoral ward in the London Borough of Newham, England

- Electoral ward for the Newham London Borough Council
- Stratford Olympic Park ward boundaries since 2022
- Borough: Newham
- County: Greater London
- Population: 11,859 (2021) (Note: 2021 Census data reported for 2022 ward boundaries)
- Electorate: 7,750 (2022)
- Major settlements: East Village
- Area: 1.268 square kilometres (0.490 sq mi)

Current electoral ward
- Created: 2022
- Number of members: 2
- Councillors: Nate Higgins; Joe Hudson-Small
- Created from: Stratford and New Town
- GSS code: E05013925

Stratford Olympic Park is an electoral ward in the London Borough of Newham. The ward was first used in the 2022 elections. It returns two councillors to Newham London Borough Council.

== List of councillors ==
Seat	Councillor	Took office	Left office	Party	Election
1	Nate Higgins	2022	Incumbent	Green	2022, 2026
2	Danny Keeling	2022	2026	Green	2022
2	Joe Hudson-Small	2026	Incumbent	Green	2026

== Newham council elections ==
=== 2026 election ===
The election took place on 7 May 2026.

2026 Newham London Borough Council election: Stratford Olympic Park
Party	Candidate	Votes	%	±%
Green	Nate Higgins	1,696	64.6	
Green	Joe Hudson-Small	1,483	56.5	
Labour	Darren Mason	450	17.1	
Labour	Rachael Osei-Temeng	410	15.6	
Liberal Democrats	Laura Willoughby	166	6.3	
Reform	Jonathan Baxter	156	5.9	
NIP	Dilshad Ali	138	5.3	
Conservative	Vijaya Dave	123	4.7	
Liberal Democrats	Robert Briggs	121	4.6	
NIP	Vaishali Shah	110	4.2	
Conservative	Rachel Nabudde	102	3.9	
Reform	Rabindranauth Ramday	96	3.7	
Turnout		2,639	31.4	−2.5
Rejected ballots		13		
Registered electors		8,414		
Green hold		Swing		
Green hold		Swing		

=== 2022 election ===
The election took place on 5 May 2022.

2022 Newham London Borough Council election: Stratford Olympic Park
Party	Candidate	Votes	%	±%
Green	Nate Higgins	1,394	55.8	N/A
Green	Danny Keeling	1,186	47.5	N/A
Labour	Nareser Osei	919	36.8	N/A
Labour	Mo Ravat	765	30.6	N/A
Liberal Democrats	Saleyha Ashsan	274	11.0	N/A
Liberal Democrats	James Rumsby	198	7.9	N/A
Conservative	Ryan Baldry	122	4.9	N/A
Conservative	Andrius Kavaliauskas	89	3.6	N/A
CPA	David Ilori	25	1.0	N/A
CPA	Esther Smith	25	1.0	N/A
Turnout		2,632	33.9	N/A
Registered electors		7,750		
Green win (new seat)				
Green win (new seat)				
