= Forhad Hussain =

Mayor of Newham since 2026

Mayor of Newham Forhad Hussain

Mayor of Newham
- Incumbent
- Assumed office 11 May 2026
- Preceded by: Rokhsana Fiaz

Personal details
- Born: Newham, London
- Party: Labour

Forhad Hussain is a British politician who has served as the Mayor of Newham since May 2026. He previously served as a Labour Councillor in Plaistow North from 2010-2018, where he also held senior roles as Cabinet Member within Newham Council.

== Biography ==
Hussain is a lifelong resident of Plaistow, Newham. Hussain served as a Labour councillor in Plaistow North from 2010-2018 where he also held senior roles as Cabinet Member for Commercial Opportunities and then as Cabinet Member for Crime and Anti-Social Behaviour.

In May 2026, Hussain was elected as Mayor of Newham in the 2026 Newham mayoral election, although with a significantly reduced vote share compared with Labour's victory in 2022. In the 2026 Newham London Borough Council election, Labour lost overall control of the council, ending its dominance since 1971. The party won 26 out of the 66 seats, down from the 64 seats it secured in the 2022 election.
