= Paul Maynard =

British politician

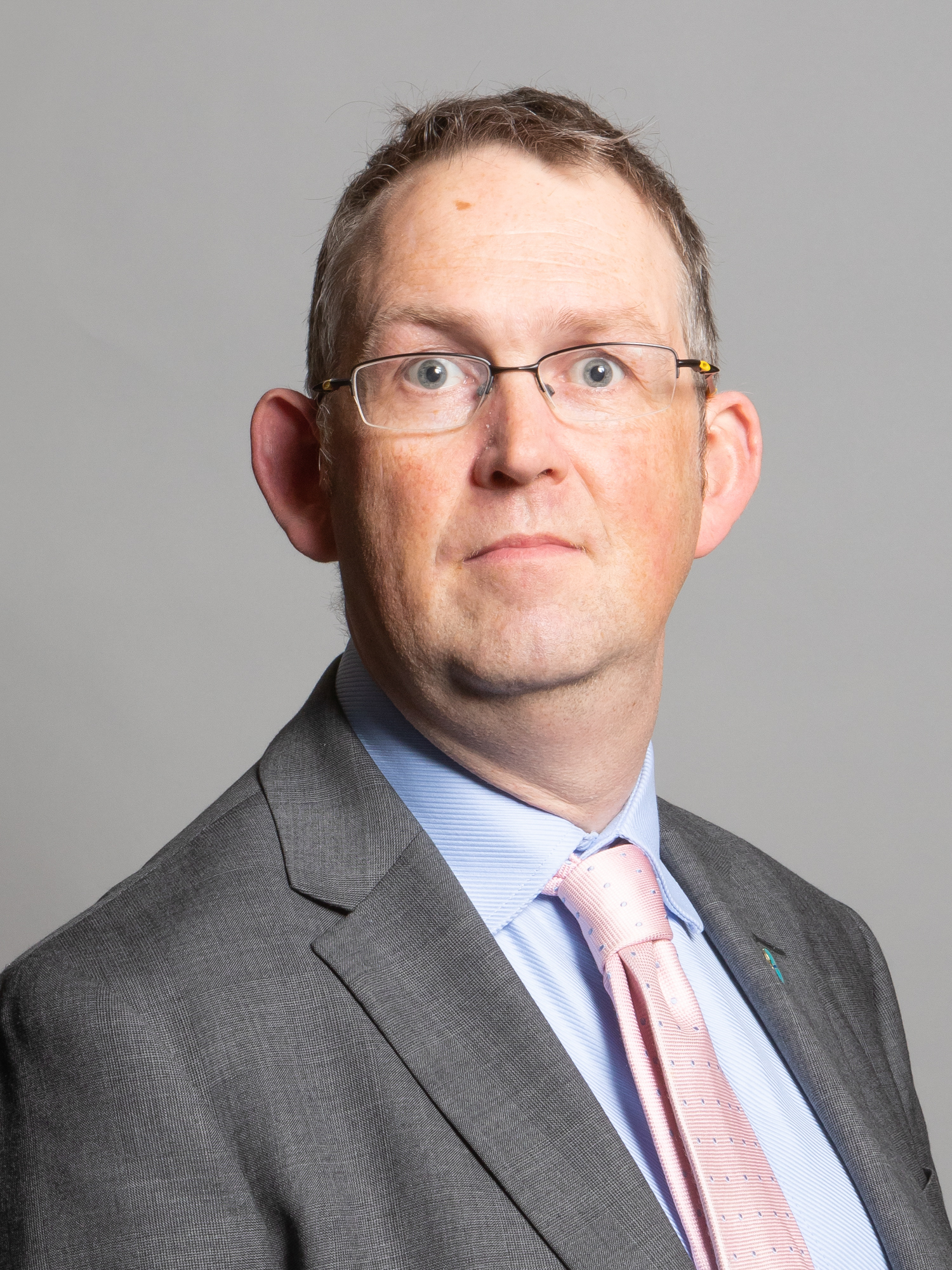
- Official portrait, 2020

Parliamentary Under-Secretary of State for Pensions
- In office 13 November 2023 – 5 July 2024
- Prime Minister: Rishi Sunak
- Preceded by: Laura Trott
- Succeeded by: Emma Reynolds

Parliamentary Under-Secretary of State for Transport
- In office 26 July 2019 – 13 February 2020
- Prime Minister: Boris Johnson
- Preceded by: Andrew Jones
- Succeeded by: Rachel Maclean
- In office 16 July 2016 – 9 January 2018
- Prime Minister: Theresa May
- Preceded by: Claire Perry
- Succeeded by: Nus Ghani

Parliamentary Under-Secretary of State for Justice
- In office 9 May 2019 – 26 July 2019
- Prime Minister: Theresa May
- Preceded by: Lucy Frazer
- Succeeded by: Wendy Morton

Lord Commissioner of the Treasury
- In office 9 January 2018 – 9 May 2019
- Prime Minister: Theresa May
- Preceded by: Guto Bebb
- Succeeded by: Nus Ghani

Member of Parliament for Blackpool North and Cleveleys
- In office 6 May 2010 – 30 May 2024
- Preceded by: Constituency created
- Succeeded by: Constituency abolished

Personal details
- Born: Paul Christopher Maynard; 16 December 1975 (age 50) Crewe, Cheshire, England
- Party: Conservative
- Education: University College, Oxford
- Website: paulmaynard.co.uk

Paul Maynard (born 16 December 1975) is a British politician who served from 2010 until 2024 as the Member of Parliament (MP) for Blackpool North and Cleveleys. A member of the Conservative Party, he served Parliamentary Under-Secretary of State for Pensions from 2023 to 2024. He previously as served as Parliamentary Under-Secretary of State for Justice in 2019 and for Transport from 2016 to 2018 and again from 2019 to 2020.

== Early life ==
Maynard was born in Crewe, Cheshire. Owing to being strangled by the umbilical cord at birth, Maynard has cerebral palsy and a speech defect. At the age of 22 he developed epilepsy, meaning he needs to be teetotal to avoid having seizures. He attended a special education school between the ages of three and five before transferring to mainstream education.

He attended St Ambrose College, a grammar school based in Altrincham, and went on to obtain a first class history degree at University College, Oxford. Maynard was a reader at his local church and was also a governor at his local Catholic primary school.

== Political career ==
After leaving university, Maynard worked as an adviser to the Conservative MP Liam Fox and as a speechwriter for William Hague – the Conservative MP and Leader of the Opposition. On 7 December 2000, he stood unsuccessfully as the Conservative candidate in a by-election in the Custom House and Silvertown ward of Newham London Borough Council.

He came fourth when he stood unsuccessfully as the Conservative candidate in the Beckton ward of Newham Council on the 29 March 2001 and subsequently failed to get elected as a councillor on the Custom House ward of Newham Council on 2 May 2002. He unsuccessfully stood as the Conservative candidate for Twickenham in the 2005 general election, finishing second with 32.4% of the vote and a 2% swing to the Liberal Democrats.

Maynard was selected from the 'A List' for Blackpool North and Cleveleys in December 2006, having been on the Conservative A-List and moved to the constituency to live. Maynard was elected to the House of Commons in the 2010 general election with a majority of 2,150. He was the second person who has cerebral palsy to become a British MP; Conservative Terry Dicks was the first.

In February 2011, Maynard told The Times about the abuse he suffered from Labour MPs, who had mocked his disability during a Commons debate on the abolition of the Child Trust Fund on 26 October 2010. Various Labour Party sources confirmed that such behaviour was unacceptable and Rosie Winterton, the Labour chief whip, and her deputy Alan Campbell were reported to have spoken to MPs about the incident shortly afterwards. A few days after Maynard's Times interview, John Bercow, the Speaker of the House of Commons, issued a written statement warning MPs that such abuse was unacceptable. It was reported he had known about the incident for more than three months before speaking to Maynard.

In October 2013, Maynard stated 'In Canada you have people going to food banks every week and it can become a habit. But there is more government can do.' Following criticism from a number of charities, Maynard apologised for causing offence.

In 2014, he was featured in media coverage of the continuing high costs of the parliamentary expenses system, with his name included in a group of Conservative MPs with high claims for First Class rail travel.

A donation, not thought to break parliamentary rules, was made to Maynard's constituency party before his appointment as an advisor to then Energy secretary Amber Rudd following the 2015 general election. He declared a £5,000 donation to his constituency party in the register of members' interests from Addison Projects in March 2015. Addison PLC is an engineering company based in his constituency near to an intended drill site of the Cuadrilla company. In October 2015, in place of a normal debate in the Commons, it emerged that Maynard was a member of a committee of MPs to vote and debate on proposals to allow drilling for shale gas (or fracking) under protected areas, such as national parks, to the disapproval of the Labour opposition and anti-fracking activists.

Maynard voted against the Marriage (Same Sex Couples) Bill in 2013.

In the 2015 General Election, Maynard was returned as MP for his seat, with an increased majority of 3,340. Results elsewhere left Maynard as one of only two self-identified disabled MPs.

Maynard supported the UK leaving the European Union prior to the 2016 referendum.

In July 2016, new Prime Minister Theresa May appointed Maynard to replace Claire Perry as Parliamentary Under Secretary of State at the Department of Transport. He had responsibility for major rail projects, rail safety and security, passenger services, transport funding, accessibility, and rail fares and ticketing. He faced criticism due to unresolved industrial action, and consequent major service disruption, on the Southern (Govia Thameslink Railway) line.

Maynard was again returned as MP in 2017, but with a reduced majority of 2,023. Results elsewhere meant Maynard was one of five self-identified disabled MPs, an increase of three since the previous general election.

On 9 January 2018, Prime Minister Theresa May made Maynard a Government Whip by awarding him the role of Lord Commissioner of HM Treasury and he ceased working as Parliamentary Under Secretary of State at the Department of Transport.

Maynard has campaigned on a range of issues, such keeping fuel prices low and investment for rebuilding St Mary's Catholic College. He has long been an advocate for disabilities, with active links to the RDA, Scope and Trailblazers. In May 2016, Maynard played an active role in improving accessibility of apprenticeships for people with learning disabilities. Engaging with a task force he produced a list of recommendations to be reviewed by the BIS and DWP for future consideration.

In Parliament, Maynard previously served on the Work and Pensions Committee and Transport Committee.

In May 2019, he was appointed Parliamentary Under-Secretary of State for Justice in the Second May ministry until July 2019. During his time in role he initiated renovation of courts and judiciary sites and announced the introduction of body worn cameras for bailiffs acting on behalf of the High Court

In July 2019, Maynard was named as Aviation Minister. He launched the Airfield Development Fund

The December 2019 General Election saw Maynard retain his seat with a majority of 8,596. He stood on a manifesto backing Brexit, investing in the NHS, Police and young people.

In June 2022, he proposed a law to replace the House of Lords with an elected Senate.

Maynard supported Rishi Sunak in the July–September 2022 Conservative Party leadership election.

During his time as a backbencher Maynard became Chair of the first ever Cerebral Palsy APPG, Chair of the Assistive Technology APPG, Chair of the Penal Affairs APPG and was an active member of the Debt and Personal Finance APPG. His interest in debt support and limited access to cash machines led him to become a member of the LINK Consumer Council. Maynard donated his earnings from sitting on the Consumer Council to local charities

In the November 2023 British cabinet reshuffle, he returned to the frontbench as Parliamentary Under-Secretary of State for Pensions, succeeding Laura Trott.

In January 2024, following an investigation by The Sunday Times newspaper, Maynard was referred to the parliamentary expenses watchdog after allegedly using taxpayer funds to pay for party political material and that he claimed rent from an office used by the local Conservative Party. Maynard claimed £106,000 in printing costs since 2010, the most of any Conservative MP. The Labour Party chairwoman Anneliese Dodds urged Rishi Sunak to refer the case to the prime minister's ethics adviser, Sir Laurie Magnus.

== Personal life ==
Maynard lives in Bispham, Blackpool. He is a Catholic.

Parliament of the United Kingdom
Preceded by Constituency created	Member of Parliament for Blackpool North and Cleveleys; 2010–2024	Succeeded by Constituency abolished
Preceded by Claire Perry	Parliamentary Under-Secretary of State for Transport; 2016–2018	Succeeded by Nus Ghani
