= Rokhsana Fiaz =

Mayor of Newham

Rokhsana Fiaz OBE

Mayor of Newham
- In office 7 May 2018 – 11 May 2026
- Preceded by: Robin Wales
- Succeeded by: Forhad Hussain

Personal details
- Party: Labour Co-operative
- Education: Goldsmiths, University of London

Rokhsana Fiaz OBE is a Labour and Co-operative Party politician who served as Mayor of Newham from 2018 to 2026.

== Early life ==
Fiaz was born in Mile End Hospital in the London Borough of Tower Hamlets to parents who had moved to London from Pakistan in the 1960s. Fiaz began her studies in law and IT at Wolverhampton, but withdrew and moved back to London due to a family crisis. She subsequently completed a degree in Philosophy, Politics and Economics at Goldsmiths, University of London. During university, she became involved in student politics.

== Career ==
Fiaz was elected as a councillor for the Newham ward of Custom House in 2014. Ahead of the 2018 mayoral election, following protracted disagreements within the local party, the incumbent Labour Mayor of Newham (and the first directly elected Mayor of Newham) Sir Robin Wales was not automatically re-selected as the Labour Party's candidate. In the open selection that followed, Fiaz defeated Wales for the Labour nomination by 861 votes to 503.

Fiaz was subsequently elected mayor in May 2018, receiving 73.4% of the first preference votes (53,214 votes). She is the first directly elected female mayor for any London borough.

Fiaz promised to hold a referendum on the direct elected mayoral system and this took place in May 2021. Voters decided by 56% to 44% to retain the system.

In the local elections of May 2022 Rokhsana Fiaz returned as mayor for a second term, securing 35,696 votes (56.2%).

She was conferred with an Honorary Fellowship by UCL in 2022 in recognition of her political services.

In July 2025 Fiaz announced that she would not be the Labour candidate for Mayor of Newham in the May 2026 election.

=== Leadership and policy criticism ===
In July 2020, 18 Labour councillors submitted a formal complaint to London Labour alleging that Fiaz’s leadership style was “aggressive, dismissive, and controlling”, and that it had contributed to a hostile working environment. Following disputes between the mayor and councillors, Newham Council commissioned an independent investigation in 2023. Although the investigation found no formal breach of the code of conduct, the chair of the Standards Advisory Committee expressed concerns regarding evidence presented during the inquiry. A report by the Centre for Governance and Scrutiny later stated that personal animosity between the mayor and certain councillors had affected the council’s scrutiny functions.

In 2024, Fiaz brought an Employment Tribunal claim against the London Borough of Newham alleging race and sex discrimination relating to her treatment during a 2022 budget meeting. The claim was settled out of court in December 2024, with the council agreeing to pay £30,000 plus VAT towards her legal costs. In 2026, opposition councillors raised concerns regarding the administration’s handling of questions relating to the settlement and the use of non-disclosure agreements.

Fiaz also faced criticism over several policy decisions during her administration. Her pledge to deliver 1,000 new council homes received scrutiny after the council delivered fewer homes than originally promised. Proposals to end Newham’s universal free school meals programme prompted public opposition and dissent among Labour councillors, leading the administration to reverse the decision. Her administration additionally introduced emissions-based parking permit charges despite substantial opposition during public consultation.

Community groups and local residents also criticised the closure of facilities including Newham City Farm and Stratford Circus during her tenure. Financial pressures affecting the council additionally drew attention throughout her mayoralty, including issues relating to the council’s Repairs and Maintenance Service and rising levels of borough debt.

During Fiaz’s tenure, Newham Council faced significant challenges relating to housing and temporary accommodation. In May 2025, the Ministry of Housing, Communities and Local Government issued the council with a non-statutory Best Value Notice citing concerns over governance, value for money, and housing service delivery following regulatory criticism of the council’s housing services.

During Rokhsana Fiaz's tenure as Mayor of Newham London Borough Council (2018–2026), the council experienced a relatively high turnover of chief executives (6), including both permanent and interim appointments. This pattern was noted by some opposition councillors and commentators, who raised concerns about continuity and senior leadership stability within the authority.

In 2025, the departure of chief executive Abi Gbago attracted significant public and political attention. The exit was associated with a reported settlement agreement, which was approved by the council and included a confidentiality clause. Opposition figures criticised the circumstances and cost of the settlement, particularly given wider financial pressures affecting the council at the time. The council stated that Gbago left to take a career break, and no findings of wrongdoing were made against her.

== Honours ==
In the 2009 Birthday Honours, Fiaz was appointed Officer of the Order of the British Empire (OBE) "for services to Black and Minority Ethnic People."
