= Wall End (ward) =

- Electoral ward for the Newham London Borough Council
- Wall End ward boundaries since 2022
- Borough: Newham
- County: Greater London
- Population: 16,502 (2021) (Note: 2021 Census data reported for 2022 ward boundaries)
- Electorate: 10,756 (2022)
- Area: 1.430 square kilometres (0.552 sq mi)

Current electoral ward
- Created: 1965
- GSS code: E05013926 (2022–present)

Wall End is an electoral ward in the London Borough of Newham. The ward was first used in the 1964 elections. It returns councillors to Newham London Borough Council.

== Newham council elections since 2022 ==
There was a revision of ward boundaries in Newham in 2022.

=== 2023 by-election ===
The by-election took place on 13 July 2023, following the resignation of Luke Charters. It was held on the same day as the Boleyn by-election.

2023 Wall End by-election
| Party | Candidate | Votes | % | ±% |
|---|---|---|---|---|
| Labour | Stephanie Garfield | 1,659 | 61.1 | +12.5 |
| Conservative | Durai Kannan | 739 | 27.2 | +12.3 |
| Liberal Democrats | Claire Pattie | 138 | 5.1 | N/A |
| Green | Tassadduq Cheema | 123 | 4.5 | −4.5 |
| Reform | David Sandground | 58 | 2.1 | −0.2 |
| Majority | | 920 | 33.9 | |
| Turnout | | 2,733 | 25.1 | |
| Registered electors | | 10,900 | | |
| Labour hold | | Swing | ▲0.1 | |

=== 2022 election ===
The election took place on 5 May 2022.

2022 Newham London Borough Council election: Wall End
| Party | Candidate | Votes | % | ±% |
|---|---|---|---|---|
| Labour | Luke Charters | 2,118 | 64.1 | N/A |
| Labour | Lester Hudson | 1,929 | 58.3 | N/A |
| Labour | Jemima McAlmont | 1,882 | 56.9 | N/A |
| Independent | Swarup Chowdhury | 957 | 28.9 | N/A |
| Conservative | Saiduz Zaman | 648 | 19.6 | N/A |
| Conservative | Olugbenga Ajibade | 461 | 13.9 | N/A |
| Conservative | Jim Smith | 412 | 12.5 | N/A |
| Green | Melanie Bax | 392 | 11.9 | N/A |
| Green | Matthew Savage | 336 | 10.2 | N/A |
| Green | James Buttress | 300 | 9.1 | N/A |
| CPA | Victoria Bapu | 142 | 4.3 | N/A |
| CPA | Shyam Sunder | 139 | 4.2 | N/A |
| Reform | David Sandground | 103 | 3.1 | N/A |
| CPA | Bharath Swamy | 99 | 3.0 | N/A |
| Turnout | | 3,765 | 35.0 | N/A |
| Registered electors | | 10,756 | | |
| Labour win (new boundaries) | | | | |
| Labour win (new boundaries) | | | | |
| Labour win (new boundaries) | | | | |

== 2002–2022 Newham council elections ==
Wall End ward boundaries from 2002 to 2022

There was a revision of ward boundaries in Newham in 2002.

=== 2018 election ===
The election took place on 3 May 2018.

2018 Newham London Borough Council election: Wall End
| Party | Candidate | Votes | % | ±% |
|---|---|---|---|---|
| Labour | Jennifer Bailey | 2,911 | 27.0 | N/A |
| Labour | Omanakutty Gangadharan | 2,885 | 27.0 | N/A |
| Labour | Lester Hudson | 2,633 | 24.0 | +5.0 |
| Conservative | Mufti Islam | 701 | 6.0 | N/A |
| Conservative | Masbah Khan | 693 | 6.0 | N/A |
| Conservative | Mohammed Ali | 627 | 6.0 | N/A |
| CPA | Amalraj Kakumanu | 169 | 2.0 | +1.0 |
| TUSC | Hannah Sell | 127 | 1.0 | N/A |
| CPA | Shashir Kakumanu | 118 | 1.0 | ±0.0 |
| Turnout | | 4,164 | 43.2 | −5.9 |
| Registered electors | | 9,640 | | |
| Labour hold | | Swing | | |
| Labour hold | | Swing | | |
| Labour hold | | Swing | | |

=== 2014 election ===
The election took place on 22 May 2014.

2014 Newham London Borough Council election: Wall End
| Party | Candidate | Votes | % | ±% |
|---|---|---|---|---|
| Labour | Frances Clarke | 2,617 | 20.0 | N/A |
| Labour | Ted Sparrowhawk | 2,452 | 19.0 | N/A |
| Labour | Lester Hudson | 2,438 | 19.0 | N/A |
| Conservative | Jawad Raza Khan | 1,152 | 9.0 | N/A |
| Conservative | Biju Koshy | 1,117 | 9.0 | N/A |
| Conservative | Ibrar Ahmed Mir | 1,096 | 9.0 | N/A |
| Liberal Democrats | Annasalam Pirapaharan | 541 | 4.0 | N/A |
| Liberal Democrats | Gopinathan Benoy | 450 | 4.0 | N/A |
| Liberal Democrats | Shakila Masih | 448 | 3.0 | N/A |
| Independent | Bob Singh Mudhar | 158 | 1.0 | N/A |
| CPA | Amal Raj Kakumanu | 135 | 1.0 | N/A |
| CPA | Sashir Raj Kakumanu | 124 | 1.0 | N/A |
| CPA | Sharmila Sundar Swarna | 122 | 1.0 | N/A |
| Turnout | | 4,811 | 49.1 | −2.2 |
| Registered electors | | 9,808 | | |
| Labour hold | | Swing | | |
| Labour hold | | Swing | | |
| Labour hold | | Swing | | |
