= Boleyn (ward) =

Electoral ward in the London borough of Newham

- Electoral ward for the Newham London Borough Council
- Boleyn ward boundaries since 2022
- Borough: Newham
- County: Greater London
- Population: 15,107 (2021) (Note: 2021 Census data reported for 2022 ward boundaries)
- Electorate: 9,740 (2022)
- Area: 0.7340 square kilometres (0.2834 sq mi)

Current electoral ward
- Created: 2002
- Number of members: 3
- Councillors: Mohammed Gani; Harvinder Singh Virdee; Mehmood Mirza
- GSS code: E05013905 (2022–present)

Boleyn is an electoral ward in the London Borough of Newham. The ward was first used in the 2002 elections. It returns councillors to Newham London Borough Council.

== Newham council elections since 2022 ==
There was a revision of ward boundaries in Newham in 2022.

=== 2023 by-election ===
The by-election took place on 13 July 2023, following the resignation of Cecilia Welsh. It was held on the same day as the Wall End by-election.

2023 Boleyn by-election
Party	Candidate	Votes	%	±%
Independent	Mehmood Mirza	1,153	42.5	N/A
Labour	Sofia Patel	871	32.1	−27.0
Green	Joe Hudson-Small	572	21.1	+3.5
Conservative	Laurencia Durojaiye	69	2.5	−15.6
Reform	Daniel Oxley	23	0.8	N/A
Liberal Democrats	David Terrar	22	0.8	N/A
Majority		282	10.4	
Turnout		2,729	27.7	
Registered electors		9,866		
Independent gain from Labour				

=== 2022 election ===
The election took place on 5 May 2022.

2022 Newham London Borough Council election: Boleyn
Party	Candidate	Votes	%	±%
Labour	Mohammed Gani	1,756	69.8	N/A
Labour	Harvinder Singh Virdee	1,487	59.1	N/A
Labour	Cecilia Welsh	1,450	57.6	N/A
Conservative	Md Nazrul Islam	538	21.4	N/A
Green	Peter Bright	524	20.8	N/A
Green	Helen Lynch	494	19.6	N/A
Conservative	Zillor Mannan	406	16.1	N/A
Green	Roxana-Daniela Toderascu	377	15.0	N/A
Conservative	Lawrencia Durojaiye	367	14.6	N/A
CPA	Earna Gibson	152	6.0	N/A
Turnout		2,953	30.3	N/A
Registered electors		9,740		
Labour win (new boundaries)				
Labour win (new boundaries)				
Labour win (new boundaries)				

== 2002–2022 Newham council elections ==
Boleyn ward boundaries from 2002 to 2022

=== 2018 election ===
The election took place on 3 May 2018.

2018 Newham London Borough Council election: Boleyn
Party	Candidate	Votes	%	±%
Labour	Gen Kitchen	2,824	29.0	N/A
Labour	Veronica Oakeshott	2,544	27.0	N/A
Labour	Harvinder Virdee	2,280	24.0	+2.0
Conservative	Fazlul Karim	693	7.0	N/A
Conservative	Sayadur Rahman	450	5.0	N/A
Green	Helen Lynch	405	4.0	N/A
Conservative	Khatija Meaby	384	4.0	N/A
Turnout		3,852	38.9	−5.1
Registered electors		9,900		
Labour hold		Swing		
Labour hold		Swing		
Labour hold		Swing		

=== 2014 election ===
The election took place on 22 May 2014.

2014 Newham London Borough Council election: Boleyn
Party	Candidate	Votes	%	±%
Labour	Obaid Khan	2,658	24.0	N/A
Labour	Charity Fiberesima	2,505	23.0	N/A
Labour	Harvinder Singh Virdee	2,425	22.0	N/A
Conservative	Jamal Uddin	869	8.0	N/A
Conservative	Yasir Asif	823	8.0	N/A
Conservative	Yaseen Farmer	756	7.0	N/A
TUSC	Ben Robinson	342	3.0	N/A
CPA	Barbara Chukwurah	270	2.0	N/A
CPA	Stephen Williamson	259	2.0	N/A
Turnout		4,261	44.0	−4.7
Registered electors		9,689		
Labour hold		Swing		
Labour hold		Swing		
Labour hold		Swing		
