= Robin Wales =

British politician (born 1955)

Sir Robin Wales
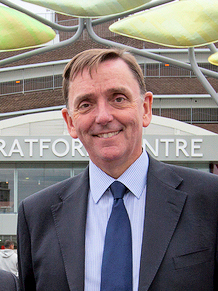
- Wales in 2012

Mayor of Newham
- In office 6 May 2002 – 6 May 2018
- Preceded by: Office established
- Succeeded by: Rokhsana Fiaz

Leader of Newham Council
- In office 1995 – 5 May 2002
- Preceded by: Mike Brown
- Succeeded by: Office abolished

Member of Newham Council
- In office 9 July 1992 – 2 May 2002
- Ward: Little Ilford (1992–1994); Manor Park (1994–1998); Canning Town and Grange (1998–2002)
- In office 6 May 1982 – 8 May 1986
- Ward: Castle

Personal details
- Born: Robert Andrew Wales; 18 January 1955 (age 71) Kilmarnock, Scotland
- Party: Reform UK (2026–)
- Other political affiliations: Labour Party (until 2026)
- Education: Glasgow University (BSc)

Sir Robert Andrew "Robin" Wales (born 18 January 1955) is a British Reform UK politician who served as Mayor of Newham from 2002 to 2018, as a Labour Party member. Prior to taking up that newly created role, he was leader of Newham Council from 1995, having been a councillor from 1982 to 1986 and 1992 to 2002.

Wales was a member of the Labour Party, and became Labour's first directly elected mayor in England in 2002. He was re-elected in 2006, 2010 and 2014. In 2018 he was replaced as Labour's candidate for mayor by Custom House councillor Rokhsana Fiaz, who won with 861 votes in a ballot of Labour Party members to Wales' 503.

He currently works with the centre-right think tank Policy Exchange. He is also Reform UK's London Director of Local Government.

== Background and early career ==
Wales was born in Kilmarnock, Scotland, on 18 January 1955. He spent his childhood in Kilmarnock, attending Kilmarnock Academy. He went on to study at Glasgow University and graduated with a BSc in chemistry.

Wales joined the Labour Party in 1970, aged 15. He served as chairman of Glasgow University Labour Club in 1975–76. He chaired Scottish Labour Students (SOLS) in 1976–77. SOLS members were renowned for their wresting back control of the National Organisation of Labour Students (NOLS) from the Militant tendency in 1975. Wales was part of the contingent of SOLS which took the "ice pick express" (a bus covered in posters of an ice pick – the weapon used to kill Trotsky) to the 1976 NOLS Conference at Lancaster University.

== Newham council ==
In 1978, Wales moved to the London Borough of Newham and in 1982 was elected to the council, representing Castle ward. He did not contest the 1986 or 1990 elections but was returned as councillor for Little Ilford ward in a 1992 by-election. At the 1994 election he again stood successfully, this time in Manor Park ward, and in 1995 he was elected leader of the council. In 1998 he was elected as councillor for Canning Town and Grange ward.

From 2000 to 2006, Wales also served as chairman of the Association of London Government, known as London Councils since 2006. London Councils is a think-tank and lobbying organisation which serves the interests of the 32 London borough councils, plus the City of London Corporation. He was recognised in the 2000 Birthday Honours, receiving a knighthood for his services to local government.

== Mayor of Newham ==
In 2000 local authorities were granted the opportunity to directly elect an executive mayor with far-reaching decision-making powers. In this model of governance the mayor is directly elected by voters in the borough to serve for a period of four years. The elected mayor then chooses their cabinet, which must consist of no more than 10 councillors.

In 2002 Newham held a referendum and voted for the replacement of the traditional leader and cabinet model with the new directly elected mayoral system. Wales became Labour's first directly elected mayor in England. He polled 20,384 votes (50.8%).

Wales was re-elected in 2006, receiving 28,655 first preference votes (47.9%), with a further 2,983 second preferences; he achieved 68.2% in the final tally. He easily won a third term in 2010, with 64,748 votes (68.0%).

Wales was part of the London 2012 Board which was involved in the Olympic and Paralympic Games bid for London. Social regeneration was at the heart of the London bid and was instrumental in securing the right to host in 2005.

Wales held a position on the Boards of both the London Organising Committee for the Olympic Games (LOCOG) and the Olympic Park Legacy Company (OPLC), which was renamed the London Legacy Development Corporation (LLDC) in 2012. He also chaired the Six Host Boroughs group which represented the interests of those boroughs most affected by the 2012 Games.

In 2014 Wales was elected for a fourth term as mayor. He received 47,095 votes (61.2%).

In 2016 Wales won a vote of party members and affiliates to automatically re-select him as Labour candidate for the 2018 mayoral election, rather than holding an open selection. All 60 council seats in Newham were controlled by Labour. However, a number of Labour Party members questioned the process, arguing the party's rules were broken because they were applied differently to different affiliated organisations, with some unions with several branches being given multiple votes whilst others who also had multiple branches were under the impression that they only had one vote. Under the threat of being taken to court, the party agreed to re-run the trigger ballot.

In 2018 Wales was de-selected by the Newham Labour Party to be their candidate in the mayoral election, losing to Custom House councillor Rokhsana Fiaz by 861 votes to 503.

== Politics and beliefs ==
Wales and other east London leaders, as well as the Mayor of London, have claimed to be working towards achieving convergence, meaning the improvement of the social and economic chances of people in the East End, raising them to the London average. This requires increasing employment, improving health and reducing poverty.

Wales has said he is committed to helping residents benefit from economic development in Newham, particularly in terms of employment and skills. He names the Westfield Stratford City development as fundamental for securing the future prosperity of the area. He is often cited as believing the Olympics forms only one part of the transformation of Newham and the wider East End. Other key developments include regeneration in Canning Town and Custom House and in the Royal Docks and Silvertown Quays.

Wales believes that local employment opportunities are a critical success factor of regeneration projects. He has named Canary Wharf and the Olympic Delivery Authority's construction of the Olympic Park as two examples where local people have benefitted less than hoped from the job opportunities created.

== Controversies ==
Wales was involved in a dispute with the market traders at Queen's Market. The traders and residents were objecting to plans to demolish the market and replace it with a new market-hall with 164 stalls and 6,374 sq metres of shop units, 350 homes, a civic building and a library. In 2009, Mayor of London Boris Johnson over-ruled Wales' decision to build the 31-storey tower.

It was alleged in 2010 that Wales refused to work alongside the former Mayor of Tower Hamlets, Lutfur Rahman, who was later removed from office for breaching electoral rules.

In 2014, the mayor and council were in dispute with the Focus E15 campaign group, which complained about the lack of social housing within the borough. Wales later apologised to the Focus E15 families about the dispute.

Ahead of the 2018 mayoral election, which could have seen Wales secure a fifth four-year term, Private Eye reported that Labour Party members from 20 wards in Newham had voted in November 2016 on whether any Labour candidate other than Wales should be allowed to stand in the election. A total of 424 members voted to allow other candidates to stand against Wales, while 351 voted for Wales being the only candidate allowed to stand. Following this vote, 17 Labour Party affiliates such as trade union branches were allowed a vote in the question, with one affiliate's vote counting as equal to all of the members of one ward. Once the party affiliates' votes were added, the result was turned in favour of Wales being the only Labour candidate permitted to stand in the 2018 election. It was reported that some members were disgruntled at this process: for example, one affiliate was a trade union with one member who was a paid advisor to Wales, and that person's vote counted as equal to dozens of members of one ward.

== Later political career ==
In 2019 Wales moved to Suffolk. In 2024 he was the Labour candidate to be the county's Police and Crime Commissioner. On 4 February 2026, he announced that he had left the Labour Party.

In March 2026, Wales joined Reform UK. He will serve as Reform UK's London director of local government, with Clive Furness as his senior advisor and mayoral candidate for Newham.

== Sources ==
- https://www.standard.co.uk/news/london/40m-for-stake-in-olympic-stadium-is-worthwhile-says-newham-mayor-8163006.html

Political offices
New office	Mayor of Newham; 2002–2018	Succeeded by Rokhsana Fiaz
