= Mayor of Newham =

Head of Newham London Borough Council

- Incumbent; Forhad Hussain since 11 May 2026
- Style: No courtesy title or style
- Appointer: Electorate of Newham
- Term length: Four years
- Inaugural holder: Robin Wales
- Website: https://www.newham.gov.uk/council/mayor-newham-1

The mayor of Newham is a directly elected local authority mayor responsible for the executive function of Newham London Borough Council in east London, England. The position is different from the previously existing (and largely ceremonial) annually appointed mayors of Newham, known as 'Civic Ambassador' from 2002 until the office was discontinued in 2009. The inaugural holder of the post, created on 2 May 2002, was Robin Wales, who held the position for five terms between 2002 and 2018. Wales was deselected as the Labour candidate in the 2018 election, which led to the election of Rokhsana Fiaz as mayor, after Labour held Newham in the mayoral and local council elections. Forhad Hussain was elected in 2026.

A referendum on the governance of the council was held on 6 May 2021, in which local electors voted for the continuation of the current mayoral system as the executive of the council (described as the "Mayor and Cabinet" model) over its replacement with a councillor-led committee model of governance, which would have seen the position of mayoralty being scrapped.

== Referendums ==
Mayor of Newham referendum 31 January 2002
Choice	Votes	%
Elected Mayor	27,263	68.24
Cabinet System	12,687	31.76
Required majority		50
Total	39,950	100.00
Registered voters/turnout		25.9
Source: House of Commons Library

Mayor of Newham referendum 6 May 2021
Choice	Votes	%
Elected Mayor	45,960	55.79
Committee Model	36,424	44.21
Required majority		50
Total	82,384	100.00
Registered voters/turnout		37.68

== Elections ==
=== 2002 ===
Mayor of Newham Election 2 May 2002
Party	Candidate	1st round		2nd round			1st round votesTransfer votes, 2nd round
Party	Candidate	Total	Of round	Transfers	Total	Of round	1st round votesTransfer votes, 2nd round
Labour	Robin Wales	20,384	50.8%				
Independent	Tawfique Choudhury	5,907	14.7%				
Conservative	Graham Postles	4,635	11.5%				
CPA	Alan Craig	3,649	9.1%				
BNP	Michael Davidson	2,881	7.2%				
Green	Gabrielle Rolfe	2,691	6.7%				
Labour win							

=== 2006 ===
Mayor of Newham election 4 May 2006
Party	Candidate	1st round		2nd round			1st round votesTransfer votes, 2nd round
Party	Candidate	Total	Of round	Transfers	Total	Of round	1st round votesTransfer votes, 2nd round
Labour	Robin Wales	22,155	47.9%	5,406	27,561	63.4%	
Respect	Akhtar Jafar	12,898	21.6%	2,983	15,881	36.6%	
Conservative	Shafi Choudhury	8,822	14.7%				
CPA	Alan Craig	6,559	11.0%				
Liberal Democrats	Anwar Hussain	2,886	4.8%				
Labour hold							

=== 2010 ===
Mayor of Newham election 5 May 2010
Party	Candidate	1st round		2nd round			1st round votesTransfer votes, 2nd round
Party	Candidate	Total	Of round	Transfers	Total	Of round	1st round votesTransfer votes, 2nd round
Labour	Robin Wales	64,748	68.0%				
Conservative	Maria-Joy Allen	15,330	16.1%				
Kamran Malik Communities Welfare	Kamran Malik	6,607	6.9%				
CPA	Alan Craig	6,503	6.8%				
Independent	Chikwe Nkemnacho	2,006	2.1%				
Labour hold							

=== 2014 ===
Mayor of Newham election 22 May 2014
Party	Candidate	1st round		2nd round			1st round votesTransfer votes, 2nd round
Party	Candidate	Total	Of round	Transfers	Total	Of round	1st round votesTransfer votes, 2nd round
Labour	Robin Wales	47,095	61.2%				
Conservative	Stefan Mrozinski	13,976	18.2%				
UKIP	David Mears	4,960	6.4%				
Green	Jane Lithgow	3,055	4.0%				
Communities United	Kamran Malik	2,796	3.6%				
Liberal Democrats	David Thorpe	1,757	2.3%				
TUSC	Lois Austin	1,708	2.2%				
CPA	Alex Latim	1,625	2.1%				
Labour hold							

=== 2018 ===
Wales was deselected ahead of the 2018 election.

Mayor of Newham election 3 May 2018
Party	Candidate	1st round		2nd round			1st round votesTransfer votes, 2nd round
Party	Candidate	Total	Of round	Transfers	Total	Of round	1st round votesTransfer votes, 2nd round
Labour Co-op	Rokhsana Fiaz	53,214	73.4%				
Conservative	Rahima Khan	8,627	11.9%				
Liberal Democrats	Gareth Evans	6,809	9.4%				
CPA	Tiffany Kumalinga	2,008	2.8%				
Democrats and Veterans	Daniel Oxley	1,815	2.5%				
Labour hold							

=== 2022 ===
Mayor of Newham election 5 May 2022
Party	Candidate	1st round		2nd round			1st round votesTransfer votes, 2nd round
Party	Candidate	Total	Of round	Transfers	Total	Of round	1st round votesTransfer votes, 2nd round
Labour Co-op	Rokhsana Fiaz	35,696	56.2%				
Conservative	Attic Rahman	7,390	11.6%				
Green	Robert Callender	7,003	11.0%				
Independent	Mehmood Mirza	5,369	8.5%				
Liberal Democrats	Saleyha Ahsan	3,528	5.6%				
CPA	Simeon Ademolake	2,405	3.8%				
TUSC	Lois Austin	2,096	3.3%				
Labour Co-op hold							
