= Newham Independents Party =

- Leader: Mehmood Mirza
- Founded: 2023
- Headquarters: 24 Orwell Road; London; E13 9DH
- Ideology: Localism
- Colours: Yellow; Black
- Newham London Borough Council: 24 / 66

Website
- https://newhamindependents.org/

The Newham Independents Party (NIP) is a political party based in the London Borough of Newham in the United Kingdom.

== History ==
The Newham Independents Party came second in West Ham and Beckton in the 2024 United Kingdom general election.

As of January 2026, they form a four councillor group on Newham London Borough Council. They include two winning independent candidates who stood at the Boleyn by-election and Plaistow North by-election in 2023. At the Plaistow South by-election in 2025 the winner was a Newham Independents candidate.

In the 2026 local election, the party obtained 24 seats, out of the 38 seats lost by Labour. The party focus on Gaza, Iran and Palestine as a key electoral issue.

The party generally draws its votes from Muslim and South Asian voters.
