= Stratford (ward) =

Electoral ward in London, England

- Electoral ward for the Newham London Borough Council
- Stratford ward boundaries since 2022
- Borough: Newham
- County: Greater London
- Population: 17,615 (2024 estimate)
- Major settlements: Stratford
- Area: 2.504 km²

Current electoral ward
- Created: 1965–1978 (first creation); 2022 (second creation)
- Number of members: 1965–2002: 2; 2022–present: 3
- Councillors: Chae Ho Hwang; Danny Keeling; Sonia Quintero
- GSS code: E05013924 (2022–present)

Stratford is an electoral ward in the London Borough of Newham. The ward was originally created in 1965 and abolished in 2002. It was created again in 2022. It returns councillors to Newham London Borough Council.

== List of councillors ==
=== First creation ===
Seat	Councillor	Took office	Left office	Party	Election
1	E. Goodyer	1964	1974	Labour	1964, 1968, 1971
2	J. Riley	1964	1968	Labour	1964
2	H. Doran	1968	1978	Labour	1968, 1971, 1974
1	A. Dowley	1974	1978	Labour	1974
1	James Goldsmith	1978	1990	Labour	1978, 1982, 1986
2	Raymond Lloyd	1978	1982	Labour	1978
2	James Riley	1982	2002	Labour	1982 ... 1998
1	James Newstead	1990	2000	Labour	1990, 1994, 1998
1	Judith Garfield	2000	2002	Labour	2000

=== Second creation ===
Seat	Councillor	Took office	Left office	Party	Election
1	Joshua Garfield	2022	2026	Labour	2022
2	Sabia Kamali	2022	2026	Labour	2022
3	Terry Paul	2022	2026	Labour	2022
1	Chae Ho Hwang	2026	Incumbent	Green	2026
2	Danny Keeling	2026	Incumbent	Green	2026
3	Sonia Quintero	2026	Incumbent	Green	2026

== Summary ==
Councillors elected by party at each general borough election.

- Labour
- Green

== Newham council elections since 2022 ==
There was a revision of ward boundaries in Newham in 2022.

=== 2026 election ===
The election took place on 7 May 2026.

2026 Newham London Borough Council election: Stratford
Party	Candidate	Votes	%	±%
Green	Chae Ho Hwang	1,428	45.5	
Green	Danny Keeling	1,381	44.0	
Green	Sonia Quintero	1,357	43.2	
Labour Co-op	James Beckles	889	28.3	
Labour Co-op	Sabia Kamali	773	24.6	
Labour Co-op	Femi Falola	765	24.4	
NIP	Shohel Alam	343	10.9	
NIP	Naimul Islam	315	10.0	
Conservative	Nitin John Thomas	280	8.9	
Liberal Democrats	Samie Dorgham	279	8.9	
Reform	Alfie Mosely	274	8.7	
NIP	Maksudul Haque	261	8.3	
Conservative	Miral Amin	247	7.9	
Conservative	Jahangir Bhuiyan	205	6.5	
Independent	Lucrece Sainclair	53	1.7	
Turnout		3,161	29.7	+6.9
Rejected ballots		23		
Registered electors		10,635		
Green gain from Labour		Swing		
Green gain from Labour		Swing		
Green gain from Labour		Swing		

=== 2022 election ===
The election took place on 2 May 2002.

2022 Newham London Borough Council election: Stratford
Party	Candidate	Votes	%	±%
Labour	Joshua Garfield	1,280	59.1	N/A
Labour	Sabia Kamali	1,265	58.4	N/A
Labour	Terry Paul	1,169	54.0	N/A
Green	Ed Furst	501	23.1	N/A
Green	Moira Lascelles	481	22.2	N/A
Green	Pau Ingles	437	20.2	N/A
Liberal Democrats	Hillary Briffa	364	16.8	N/A
Liberal Democrats	Samie Dorgham	279	12.9	N/A
Conservative	Reece Chana	261	12.1	N/A
Conservative	John Oxley	246	11.4	N/A
Conservative	Raja Shokat	210	9.7	N/A
Turnout		2,385	22.8	N/A
Registered electors		10,454		
Labour win (new seat)				
Labour win (new seat)				
Labour win (new seat)				

== 1994–2002 Newham Council elections ==
The boundaries of the ward were adjusted on 1 April 1994.

=== 2000 by-election ===
The by-election took place on 19 October 2000, following the death of James Newstead.

2000 Stratford by-election
Party	Candidate	Votes	%	±%
Labour	Judith Garfield	465		
Conservative	Douglas Taylor	270		
Socialist Alliance	Paul Phillips	60		
Turnout				
Labour hold		Swing		

=== 1998 election ===
The election on 7 May 1998 took place on the same day as the 1998 Greater London Authority referendum.

1998 Newham London Borough Council election: Stratford
Party	Candidate	Votes	%	±%
Labour	James Riley	770	65.49	▲6.17
Labour	James Newstead	699		
Newham Ind.	Alan Stewart	192	15.07	New
Newham Ind.	Conor Loughran	146		
Conservative	Nigel Nadolski	142	12.66	▲1.16
Monster Raving Loony	Lord Toby Jug	76	6.78	New
Registered electors		4,449		▼119
Turnout		1,211	27.22	▼7.26
Rejected ballots		20	1.65	▲1.14
Labour hold		Swing		
Labour hold		Swing		

=== 1994 election ===
The election took place on 5 May 1994.

1994 Newham London Borough Council election: Stratford
Party	Candidate	Votes	%	±%
Labour	James Riley	876	59.32	▲4.97
Labour	James Newstead	835		
Liberal Democrats	Fergus Dodd	334	21.76	▲5.46
Liberal Democrats	Paul Hyde	293		
Conservative	Darren Lawrence	197	11.50	▼5.21
Conservative	Nigel Nadolski	134		
Green	Harjinder Flora	107	7.42	▼5.22
Registered electors		4,568		▼426
Turnout		1,575	34.48	▲1.64
Rejected ballots		8	0.51	▼0.04
Labour win (new boundaries)				
Labour win (new boundaries)				

== 1978–1994 Newham Council elections ==
Stratford ward boundaries from 1978 to 1994

There was a revision of ward boundaries in Newham in 1978.

=== 1990 election ===
The election took place on 3 May 1990.

1990 Newham London Borough Council election: Stratford
Party	Candidate	Votes	%	±%
Labour	James Riley	937	54.35	
Labour	James Newstead	936		
Conservative	William Flynn	314	16.71	
Liberal Democrats	Martin Edwardes	281	16.30	
Conservative	Armyn Hennessy	262		
Green	Charles Seber	218	12.64	
Registered electors		4,994		
Turnout		1640	32.84	
Rejected ballots		9	0.55	
Labour hold		Swing		
Labour hold		Swing		

=== 1986 election ===
The election took place on 8 May 1986.

1986 Newham London Borough Council election: Stratford
Party	Candidate	Votes	%	±%
Labour	James Riley	769	61.5	+4.3
Labour	James Goldsmith	733		N/A
Conservative	William Flynn	228	18.2	−0.1
Alliance	Michael Hogan	203	16.2	−8.2
Conservative	Antoinette Tuthill	174		N/A
Alliance	Charmaine Pierre	167		N/A
Green	Paul Mason	50	4.0	N/A
Turnout			26.6	+3.0
Registered electors		5,977		
Labour hold		Swing		
Labour hold		Swing		

=== 1982 election ===
The election took place on 6 May 1982.

1982 Newham London Borough Council election: Stratford
Party	Candidate	Votes	%	±%
Labour	James Goldsmith	665	57.2	−12.7
Labour	James Riley	563		N/A
Alliance	Albert Fuller	284	24.4	N/A
Alliance	Denis P. Groutage	230		N/A
Conservative	Florence Jackson	213	18.3	−1.6
Conservative	Emily Short	178		N/A
Turnout			23.6	−1.3
Registered electors		5,472		
Labour hold		Swing		
Labour hold		Swing		

=== 1978 election ===
The election took place on 4 May 1978.

1978 Newham London Borough Council election: Stratford
Party	Candidate	Votes	%	±%
Labour	James Goldsmith	951	69.9	N/A
Labour	Raymond Lloyd	944		N/A
Conservative	Michael Bevis	271	19.9	N/A
Conservative	Anthony Crighton	266		N/A
National Front	Ronald Bock	102	7.5	N/A
Residents	Sheila Fisher	36	2.6	N/A
Residents	Elsa Fletcher	27		N/A
Turnout			24.9	N/A
Registered electors		5,830		
Labour win (new boundaries)				
Labour win (new boundaries)				

== 1964–1978 Newham Council elections ==
=== 1974 election ===
The election took place on 2 May 1974.

1974 Newham London Borough Council election: Stratford
Party	Candidate	Votes	%
Labour	H. Doran	Unopposed	Unopposed
Labour	A. Dowley	Unopposed	Unopposed
Registered electors		4,811	
Labour hold			
Labour hold			

=== 1971 election ===
The election took place on 13 May 1971.

1971 Newham London Borough Council election: Stratford
Party	Candidate	Votes	%	±%
Labour	H. Doran	907	75.3	+22.2
Labour	E. Goodyer	879		N/A
Residents	J. Maddock	209	17.3	N/A
Residents	H. Hennem	202		N/A
Communist	T. Bowers	49	4.1	−5.5
National Front	B. Tildesley	40	3.3	−5.5
Turnout			24.2	+7.9
Registered electors		5,115		
Labour hold		Swing		
Labour hold		Swing		

=== 1968 election ===
The election took place on 9 May 1968.

1968 Newham London Borough Council election: Stratford
Party	Candidate	Votes	%	±%
Labour	H. Doran	440	53.1	−21.3
Labour	E. Goodyer	399		N/A
Conservative	E. Orrin	186	22.5	N/A
Conservative	M. Fitch	182		N/A
Communist	T. Bowers	79	9.6	N/A
National Front	S. Wade	73	8.8	N/A
Liberal	J. Linehan	50	6.0	−9.0
Liberal	S. Wrightson	43		N/A
Turnout			16.3	−2.3
Registered electors		5,072		
Labour hold		Swing		
Labour hold		Swing		

=== 1964 election ===
The election took place on 7 May 1964.

1964 Newham London Borough Council election: Stratford
Party	Candidate	Votes	%	±%
Labour	E. Goodyer	753	74.4	N/A
Labour	J. Riley	739		N/A
Liberal	R. McCarthy	259	25.6	N/A
Liberal	G. Jennings	244		N/A
Turnout		1,054	18.6	N/A
Registered electors		5,667		
Labour win (new seat)				
Labour win (new seat)				
