= South (Newham ward) =

Electoral ward in London, England

- Former electoral ward for the Newham London Borough Council
- South ward boundaries from 1978 to 2002
- Borough: Newham
- County: Greater London
- Electorate: 12,446 (1998)
- Major settlements: Beckton

Former electoral ward
- Created: 1965
- Abolished: 2002
- Councillors: 3

South was an electoral ward in the London Borough of Newham. It returned councillors to Newham London Borough Council.

== 1978–2002 Newham Council elections ==
=== 1998 election ===
The election on 7 May 1998 took place on the same day as the 1998 Greater London Authority referendum.

1998 Newham London Borough Council election: South
Party	Candidate	Votes	%	±%
Labour	Alec Kellaway	1,930	53.01	▲17.68
Labour	Quintin Peppiatt	1,763		
Labour	Christopher Seddan	1,703		
Liberal Democrats	Stephen Bell	595	17.53	▼12.40
Conservative	Glyn Weare	570	16.34	▼3.81
Conservative	Antony Costantino	539		
BNP	Caroline Lee	283	7.34	New
BNP	Colin Smith	240		
BNP	Jay Lee	224		
National Democrats	Ian Anderson	196	5.78	New
Registered electors		12,446		▲946
Turnout		3,047	24.48	▼12.88
Rejected ballots		14	0.46	▲0.34
Labour gain from Liberal Democrats		Swing		
Labour hold		Swing		
Labour hold		Swing		

=== 1997 by-election ===
The by-election took place on 7 May 1997, following the death of Theodore Etherden.

1997 South by-election
Party	Candidate	Votes	%	±%
Labour	Quintin Peppiatt	3,705		
Conservative	Jeanette Worth	1396		
Liberal Democrats	Stephen Bell	948		
BNP	Peter Hart	642		
Newham Ind.	Lillian Hopes	209		
Turnout				
Labour hold		Swing		

=== 1995 by-election ===
The by-election took place on 26 January 1995, following the death of Thomas Jenkinson.

1995 South by-election
Party	Candidate	Votes	%	±%
Labour	Sarah Ruiz	1,441		
Conservative	Christopher Boden	473		
BNP	Peter Hart	360		
Newham Ind.	Alex Thompson	276		
Liberal Democrats	Elizabeth Laird	248		
Turnout				
Labour hold		Swing		

=== 1994 election ===
The election took place on 5 May 1994.

1994 Newham London Borough Council election: South
Party	Candidate	Votes	%	±%
Labour	Thomas Jenkinson	1,462	35.33	▲1.52
Labour	Theodore Etherden	1,421		
Liberal Democrats	Alec Kellaway	1,340	29.94	▼4.45
Labour	Anthony McAlmont	1,267		
Liberal Democrats	Elizabeth Laird	1,136		
Liberal Democrats	Elizabeth Lutzeier	1,039		
Conservative	Venetia Hazel	814	20.15	▼11.65
Conservative	Barry Roberts	793		
Conservative	Norman Lewis	759		
Independent	Alexander Thomson	647	14.58	New
Independent	Lillian Hopes	570		
Independent	Lawrence Springthorpe	496		
Registered electors		11,500		▲475
Turnout		4,296	37.36	▼1.43
Rejected ballots		5	0.12	▼0.17
Labour gain from Liberal Democrats		Swing		
Labour hold		Swing		
Liberal Democrats gain from Labour		Swing		

=== 1990 election ===
The election took place on 3 May 1990.

1990 Newham London Borough Council election: South
Party	Candidate	Votes	%	±%
Liberal Democrats	Alec Kellaway	1,661	34.39	
Labour	Thomas Jenkinson	1,505	33.81	
Labour	Alexander Thomson	1,415		
Liberal Democrats	Stephen Bell	1,357		
Conservative	Damian Sutton	1,338	31.80	
Labour	Neil Wilson	1,323		
Conservative	Laurence Springthorpe	1,322		
Liberal Democrats	Paul Willett	1,269		
Registered electors		11,025		
Turnout		4277	38.79	
Rejected ballots		12	0.29	
Liberal Democrats hold		Swing		
Labour hold		Swing		
Labour hold		Swing		

=== 1987 by-election ===
The by-election took place on 5 February 1987, following the resignation of John Wilson.

1987 South by-election
Party	Candidate	Votes	%	±%
Alliance	Alec Kellaway	1,000		
Labour	Doris Maxwell	805		
Conservative	Damian Sutton	769		
Green	Terence Macdonald	68		
Turnout		9,240	28.66	
Alliance gain from Labour		Swing		

=== 1986 election ===
The election took place on 8 May 1986.

1986 Newham London Borough Council election: South
Party	Candidate	Votes	%	±%
Labour	Edward Corbett	1,269	44.7	−5.4
Labour	Thomas Jenkinson	1,215		N/A
Labour	John Wilson	1,103		N/A
Conservative	Sean Cadogan	876	30.9	+2.9
Conservative	Craig Hands	874		N/A
Conservative	Damian Sutton	836		N/A
Alliance	James Evans	693	24.4	+2.5
Alliance	Alec Kellaway	659		N/A
Alliance	William Robinson	619		N/A
Turnout			33.7	+4.8
Registered electors		9,175		
Labour hold		Swing		
Labour hold		Swing		
Labour hold		Swing		

=== 1982 election ===
The election took place on 6 May 1982.

1982 Newham London Borough Council election: South
Party	Candidate	Votes	%	±%
Labour	Edward Daly	1,033	50.1	−5.4
Labour	Leonard Manley	886		N/A
Labour	Margaret Philpott	851		N/A
Conservative	Robert Williams	577	28.0	−1.9
Conservative	Sylvia Williams	455		N/A
Alliance	Anthony Wilkinson	451	21.9	N/A
Alliance	Frances Bolton	361		N/A
Alliance	David Coleman	361		N/A
Turnout			28.9	−0.6
Registered electors		7,278		
Labour hold		Swing		
Labour hold		Swing		
Labour hold		Swing		

=== 1979 by-election ===
The by-election took place on 8 November 1979, following the resignation of Joseph Taylor.

1979 South by-election
Party	Candidate	Votes	%	±%
Labour	Leonard Manley	792		
Ratepayers	Francis Nicholson	233		
Conservative	Cedric Day	197		
Ind. Socialist	David Grainger	79		
National Front	Carol Armond	50		
Turnout			17.6%	
Labour hold		Swing		

=== 1978 election ===
The election took place on 4 May 1978.

1978 Newham London Borough Council election: South
Party	Candidate	Votes	%	±%
Labour	Joseph Taylor	1,206	55.5	−16.0
Labour	Edward Daly	1,191		N/A
Labour	Margaret Philpott	1,126		N/A
Conservative	Deryn Buckley	649	29.9	+14.5
Conservative	Frederick Turner	641		N/A
Conservative	Robert Williams	615		N/A
National Front	Brian Metz	200	9.2	−3.9
Residents	Donald Bird	119	5.5	N/A
Residents	David Reader	112		N/A
Residents	John Major	95		N/A
Turnout			29.5	+8.7
Registered electors		7,972		
Labour win (new boundaries)				
Labour win (new boundaries)				
Labour win (new boundaries)				

== 1964–1978 Newham Council elections ==
=== 1974 election ===
The election took place on 2 May 1974.

1974 Newham London Borough Council election: South
Party	Candidate	Votes	%	±%
Labour	Edward Daly	1,510	71.5	−9.8
Labour	T. Jenkinson	1,425		N/A
Labour	J. Taylor	1,366		N/A
Conservative	P. McLean	325	15.4	−3.3
Conservative	R. Williams	307		N/A
Conservative	J. Brewster	277		N/A
National Front	A. Havard	277	13.1	N/A
Turnout			20.8	−8.9
Registered electors		10,042		
Labour hold		Swing		
Labour hold		Swing		
Labour hold		Swing		

=== 1971 election ===
The election took place on 13 May 1971.

1971 Newham London Borough Council election: South
Party	Candidate	Votes	%	±%
Labour	T. Jenkinson	2,385	81.3	+29.5
Labour	Edward Daly	2,301		N/A
Labour	J. Taylor	2,222		N/A
Conservative	D. Power	550	18.7	−10.3
Conservative	J. Power	489		N/A
Conservative	H. Prendergast	468		N/A
Turnout			29.7	+4.0
Registered electors		9,638		
Labour hold		Swing		
Labour hold		Swing		
Labour hold		Swing		

=== 1970 by-election ===
The by-election took place on 4 June 1970.

1970 South by-election
Party	Candidate	Votes	%	±%
Labour	J. Taylor	1,164		
Conservative	A. Retter	373		
National Front	W. Anderson	17		
Majority		791		N/A
Turnout			15.3	
Registered electors				
Labour hold		Swing		

=== 1968 election ===
The election took place on 9 May 1968.

1968 Newham London Borough Council election: South
Party	Candidate	Votes	%	±%
Labour	H. Fisher	1,263	51.8	N/A
Labour	T. Jenkinson	1,199		N/A
Labour	Edward Daly	1,162		N/A
Conservative	R. Hunter	706	29.0	N/A
Conservative	G. Crocker	665		N/A
Conservative	T. Beach	651		N/A
Residents	W. Bird	468	19.2	N/A
Residents	A. Cameron	456		N/A
Residents	E. Keeffe	431		N/A
Turnout			25.7	N/A
Registered electors		9,968		
Labour hold		Swing		
Labour hold		Swing		
Labour hold		Swing		

=== 1964 election ===
The election took place on 7 May 1964.

1964 Newham London Borough Council election: South
Party	Candidate	Votes	%
Labour	H. Fisher	Unopposed	Unopposed
Labour	T. Jenkinson	Unopposed	Unopposed
Labour	W. Knight	Unopposed	Unopposed
Registered electors		9,321	
Labour win (new seat)			
Labour win (new seat)			
Labour win (new seat)			
