= Edward Daly (mayor) =

- Born: 1926
- Died: 1993 (aged 66–67)
- Occupations: Councillor; Mayor of Newham
- Years active: 1968–1986
- Spouses: ?; Margaret E. Philpott (m. 1980)

Edward Daly (1926–1993) was a long-term Councillor and later Mayor of the London Borough of Newham.

== Career ==
The London Borough of Newham was created by merging the former area of the Essex county borough of East Ham and the county borough of West Ham as a borough of the newly formed Greater London, on 1 April 1965.

Daly was a councillor in Newham for the Labour Party over an eighteen-year period, being repeatedly elected into office from 1968 - 1986. He first stood in 1968 for the South ward and was elected, then again 1971 and 1974 gaining the most votes in the district both times, in the 1978 election and again in 1982. He did not seek re-election in 1986.

In 1980–1981, Daly was the Mayor of Newham, which was also the year that West Ham United won the FA Cup.

== Personal life ==
Following his separation and divorce from his first wife, Daly married fellow Labour Councillor Margaret E. Philpott in July 1980, who he remained with until his death in October 1993. He is the grandfather of 12 grandchildren and 8 great grand children.
