= Edward Daly =

Edward Daly may refer to:

- Edward Daly (bishop) (1933–2016), Roman Catholic Bishop of Derry, Northern Ireland
- Edward Daly (Irish revolutionary) (1891–1916), Irish nationalist and rebel officer in the Easter Rising
- Ed Daly (1922–1984), American entrepreneur behind World Airways
- Edward Celestin Daly (1894–1964), Roman Catholic Bishop of Des Moines, Iowa, 1948–1964
- Edward Daly (mayor) (1926–1993), councillor and mayor of Newham, London
- Edward C. Daly (1914–1941), United States Navy ship (1942–1946)
- Edward M. Daly (born 1965), U.S. Army General

== See also ==
- Ed Daily (1862–1891), baseball player
