= List of mayors of Newham =

The Mayor of Newham was a position first established in 1965 with the creation of the London Borough of Newham. It replaced the mayors of East Ham and West Ham. A directly elected mayor of Newham was established in 2002 and the position was renamed as the civic ambassador. The office of Civic Ambassador was discontinued in 2009.

== Mayor ==
- 1965 Terence Charles McMillan
- 1966 Alice Emma Gannon
- 1967 Arthur Frank George Edwards
- 1968 Abraham Wolffe
- 1969 Leonard John Simons
- 1970 Michael Davidson
- 1971 Edward Sylvester Charles Kebbell
- 1972 James Christopher Carter
- 1973 Joseph Charles Taylor
- 1974 Harry Bauckham
- 1975 Louis Arthur Wood
- 1976 Herbert Albert Taylor
- 1977 Constance Louise Bock
- 1978 Harold Edward Fitzsimons
- 1979 Marjorie Edith Helps
- 1980 Edward Daly
- 1981 Stanley Hopwood
- 1982 Julia Caroline Isabelle Garfield
- 1983 Herbert Thomas Philpott
- 1984 Charles Albert Flemwell
- 1985 Thomas Nolan
- 1986 Sir Jack Clow
- 1987 Fredrick Ernest York
- 1988 James George Newstead
- 1989 Raymond Massey
- 1990 Sarah Louise Murray
- 1991 Amarjit Singh
- 1992 William Chapman
- 1993 Sarah Jean Reeves
- 1994 Maureen Knight
- 1995 William Henry Brown
- 1996 Shama Ahmed
- 1997 Victor Francis Turner
- 1998 Abdul Karim Sheikh
- 1999 Riaz Ahmed Mirza
- 2000 Bryan Collier
- 2001 Sukhdev Singh Marway

== Civic Ambassador ==
- 2002 Marie Collier
- 2003 Joy Laguda
- 2004 Patricia Holland
- 2005 Maureen Jones
- 2006 Pearson Shillingford
- 2007 Omana Gangadharan
- 2008 Akbar Chaudhary
