= 1990 Newham London Borough Council election =

- 3 May 1990

All 60 seats up for election to Newham London Borough Council 31 seats needed for a majority
- Registered: 157,951
- Turnout: 57,625, 36.48%

	First party	Second party
Leader	Stephen Timms	Unknown
Party	Labour	Conservative
Leader since	1990	Unknown
Leader's seat	Little Ilford	Unknown
Seats before	60	0
Seats won	57	2
Seat change	▼3	▲2
Popular vote	81,387	32,957
Percentage	60.08%	24.33%
	Third party	Fourth party
Leader	Alec J. Kellaway	Unknown
Party	Liberal Democrats	Green
Leader since	2 May 1987	Unknown
Leader's seat	South	Unknown
Seats before	0	0
Seats won	1	0
Seat change	▲1	Steady
Popular vote	10,599	9,192
Percentage	7.82%	6.78%
Council control before election
Labour
Council control after election
Labour

The 1990 Newham London Borough Council election to the Newham London Borough Council was held on 3 May 1990. The whole council was up for election. turnout no change was 33.0%. Labour maintained its overwhelming majority.

== Election result ==
Newham local election result 1990
Party	Seats	Gains	Losses	Net gain/loss	Seats %	Votes %	Votes	+/−
Labour	57	0	2	▼2	95.00	60.08	81,387	
Conservative	2	2	0	▲2	3.33	24.33	32,957	
Liberal Democrats	1	1	1	Steady	1.67	7.82	10,599	
Green	0	0	0	Steady	0.00	6.78	9,192	
Independent	0	0	0	Steady	0.00	0.99	1,340	
Total	60						135,475	

== Background ==
A total of 154 candidates stood in the election for the 60 seats being contested across 24 wards. Candidates included a full slate from the Labour Party, whilst the Conservative Party ran 54 candidates. The Liberal Democrats ran 12 candidates as well as 3 candidates under the Liberal Democrat Focus Team banner. Other candidates running were 22 Greens and 3 Independents.

== Election results ==
(*) - Indicates an incumbent candidate

(†) - Indicates an incumbent candidate from a different ward

=== Beckton ===
Beckton (2)
Party	Candidate	Votes	%
Labour	Maureen Knight*	679	62.65
Labour	Doris Maxwell	608	
Conservative	Margaret Byrne	384	37.35
Registered electors		3,840	
Turnout		1033	26.90
Rejected ballots		6	0.58
Labour hold			
Labour hold			

=== Bemersyde ===
Bemersyde (2)
Party	Candidate	Votes	%
Labour	David P. Kellaway	923	44.39
Labour	Peter E. Landman*	918	
Conservative	Paul Clark	625	30.12
Liberal Democrats	David J. Corney	306	12.24
Green	Simon K. Bridgeland	275	13.25
Liberal Democrats	William Robinson	201	
Registered electors		4,376	
Turnout		1854	42.37
Rejected ballots		6	0.32
Labour hold			
Labour hold			

=== Canning Town and Grange ===
Canning Town and Grange (2)
Party	Candidate	Votes	%
Labour	Charles Whincup*	1,033	53.55
Labour	Christopher B. Allen	1,020	
Conservative	Jean D. Boorman	525	27.37
Green	Richard P. Sant	366	19.08
Registered electors		5,820	
Turnout		1810	31.10
Rejected ballots		8	0.44
Labour hold			
Labour hold			

=== Castle ===
Castle (2)
Party	Candidate	Votes	%
Labour	Ronald S. Langton	1,125	58.86
Labour	Sarah L. M. Murray*	1,092	
Conservative	Roy A. Bull	498	24.95
Conservative	Dorothy M. Neal	441	
Green	Rosanne D. Goodwins	305	16.19
Registered electors		5,389	
Turnout		1910	35.44
Rejected ballots		5	0.26
Labour hold			
Labour hold			

=== Central ===
Central (2)
Party	Candidate	Votes	%
Labour	Stanley Hopwood*	1,410	65.44
Labour	Pallavi B. Patel	1,323	
Conservative	Dorothy L. Ford	457	19.24
Conservative	Danuta A. Gradosiclska	347	
Green	Rupert W. H. Goodwins	320	15.32
Registered electors		5,576	
Turnout		2066	37.05
Rejected ballots		17	0.82
Labour hold			
Labour hold			

=== Custom House & Silvertown ===
Custom House and Silvertown (3)
Party	Candidate	Votes	%
Labour	William A. Chapman*	1,340	50.12
Labour	Julia C. I. Garfield*	1,321	
Labour	Kevin Gillespie	1,240	
Conservative	David C. Gladstone	931	35.00
Conservative	Alan W. Taylor	897	
Conservative	Geraldine M. Alden	896	
Liberal Democrats	Elizabeth A. Campion	440	14.88
Liberal Democrats	Peter R. W. Guest	376	
Liberal Democrats	Nicola F. Thomson	343	
Registered electors		8,964	
Turnout		2737	30.53
Rejected ballots		10	0.37
Labour hold			
Labour hold			
Labour hold			

=== Forest Gate ===
Forest Gate (3)
Party	Candidate	Votes	%
Labour	Margaret P. Olley*	1,616	56.97
Labour	Conor M. McAuley*	1,602	
Labour	Pamela Furness^{†} (Note: Pamela was previously a councillor for Upton)	1,599	
Green	Annette Degrandis	661	22.03
Green	Morgan Kelly	644	
Conservative	William Bennett	608	21.00
Conservative	Helena D. Bernstein	593	
Conservative	Pauline F. Finn	575	
Green	Paul S. J. Sandford	558	
Registered electors		7,499	
Turnout		2955	39.41
Rejected ballots		18	0.61
Labour hold			
Labour hold			
Labour hold			

=== Greatfield ===
Greatfield (3)
Party	Candidate	Votes	%
Labour	Kevin J. Jenkins*	1,687	40.87
Conservative	Sean Cadogan	1,592	41.88
Conservative	Jacqueline M. Burns	1,524	
Conservative	Richard J. Arnopp	1,515	
Labour	Bryan A. Collier	1,515	
Labour	Kulwant S. Mangat	1,318	
Liberal Democrats	Matthew M. Huntbach	645	17.25
Liberal Democrats	Adrian Cole	626	
Registered electors		8,255	
Turnout		3750	45.43
Rejected ballots		17	0.45
Labour hold			
Conservative gain from Labour			
Conservative gain from Labour			

=== Hudsons ===
Hudsons (3)
Party	Candidate	Votes	%
Labour	Lyn C. Brown	1,248	50.95
Labour	Frederick C. Jones*	1,211	
Labour	Graham J. Lane*	1,162	
Conservative	Josephine M. Child	864	35.37
Conservative	Mark Taylor	851	
Conservative	Nicola M. Whitmore	800	
Liberal Democrats	Walter C. T. Tee	324	13.68
Registered electors		7,240	
Turnout		2408	33.26
Rejected ballots		15	0.62
Labour hold			
Labour hold			
Labour hold			

=== Kensington ===
Kensington (2)
Party	Candidate	Votes	%
Labour	Kenneth C.R. Massey*	1,680	74.72
Labour	Abdul K. Sheikh	1,618	
Conservative	Brian Johnson	315	13.91
Conservative	Stephen R. Blower	298	
Green	Rosalind M. Shanley Jordaan	251	11.37
Registered electors		5,405	
Turnout		2284	42.26
Rejected ballots		11	0.48
Labour hold			
Labour hold			

=== Little Ilford ===
Little Ilford (3)
Party	Candidate	Votes	%
Labour	Stephen C. Timms*	1,738	57.74
Labour	Patricia A. Heron*	1,683	
Labour	Bobby Thomas	1,660	
Lib Dem Focus Team	Valerie F. Leach	958	31.46
Lib Dem Focus Team	Leslie E. Groombridge	921	
Lib Dem Focus Team	Alan H. Stewart	891	
Conservative	Vera E. Ingleby	324	10.80
Conservative	Steven P. Nash	323	
Conservative	Khalid Z. Hussain	303	
Registered electors		7,965	
Turnout		3105	38.98
Rejected ballots		9	0.29
Labour hold			
Labour hold			
Labour hold			

=== Manor Park ===
Manor Park (3)
Party	Candidate	Votes	%
Labour	Amarjit Singh*	1,806	59.74
Labour	Leela L. Pendle	1,773	
Labour	Margaret Walls	1,768	
Conservative	Janet A. Lewis	733	24.07
Conservative	Mary M. King	714	
Conservative	Diane E. Harley	707	
Green	Dennis L. Middlemitch	483	16.19
Registered electors		7,909	
Turnout		3072	38.84
Rejected ballots		6	0.20
Labour hold			
Labour hold			
Labour hold			

=== Monega ===
Monega (2)
Party	Candidate	Votes	%
Labour	Lewis E. Boyce*	1,692	75.98
Labour	Frederick E. York*	1,597	
Conservative	John W. Douch	305	13.63
Conservative	Joyce F. Douch	285	
Green	Richard G. Melville	225	10.39
Registered electors		5,592	
Turnout		2236	39.99
Rejected ballots		15	0.67
Labour hold			
Labour hold			

=== New Town ===
New Town (2)
Party	Candidate	Votes	%
Labour	Carol A. Knights	945	53.70
Labour	John Isted^{†} (Note: John was a councillor for West Ham)	924	
Independent	Henry C. Cleghorn	663	25.67
Independent	Susan J. Ward	591	
Conservative	Karen V. Brennan	216	11.32
Conservative	Ana Z. McWilton	178	
Green	Kim L. Smith	162	9.30
Independent	Dexter H. Hamoomansingh	86	
Registered electors		5,108	
Turnout		1956	38.29
Rejected ballots		3	0.15
Labour hold			
Labour hold			

=== Ordnance ===
Ordnance (2)
Party	Candidate	Votes	%
Labour	Michael Brown^{†} (Note: Michael was a councillor for the Park ward)	629	48.71
Labour	Anne King*	619	
Green	Inge O'Toole	337	26.31
Conservative	Charles R.P.G. Meaby	320	24.98
Registered electors		4,005	
Turnout		1141	28.49
Rejected ballots		4	0.35
Labour hold			
Labour hold			

=== Park ===
Park (3)
Party	Candidate	Votes	%
Labour	John F. Lock*	1,649	62.07
Labour	Dominic G. Gough	1,640	
Labour	Akbar A. Chaudhary	1,624	
Conservative	June P. L. Colton	584	19.89
Conservative	Brian I. Maze	503	
Conservative	Simon N. C. Pearce	489	
Green	Arthur L. Taylor	476	18.04
Registered electors		7,667	
Turnout		2562	33.42
Rejected ballots		20	0.78
Labour hold			
Labour hold			
Labour hold			

=== Plaistow ===
Plaistow (3)
Party	Candidate	Votes	%
Labour	Jean A. Manley	1,350	46.78
Labour	Anand N. Patil*	1,105	
Labour	Riaz Ahmed	1,078	
Green	Philip H. Rimmer	692	27.48
Conservative	Robert F. Williams	673	25.74
Conservative	Sylvia L. Williams	622	
Registered electors		6,442	
Turnout		2277	35.35
Rejected ballots		9	0.40
Labour hold			
Labour hold			
Labour hold			

=== Plashet ===
Plashet (3)
Party	Candidate	Votes	%
Labour	Khawar M. Khawaja	1,442	56.27
Labour	Judith A. Jorsling^{†} (Note: Judith was a councillor for the Custom House and Silvertown ward)	1,410	
Labour	Clive M. Troubman	1,282	
Green	Helen C. Jarvis	585	22.74
Conservative	Barry W. Roberts	557	20.99
Green	Amanda J. Sandford	553	
Conservative	Sylvia E. Neal	549	
Green	Harjinder S. Flora	533	
Conservative	Ronald L. Poon-Affatt	437	
Registered electors		8,186	
Turnout		2958	36.13
Rejected ballots		21	0.71
Labour hold			
Labour hold			
Labour hold			

=== St Stephens ===
St Stephens (2)
Party	Candidate	Votes	%
Labour	Linda A. Jordan*	1,432	71.82
Labour	Dharam Sahdev	1,381	
Conservative	Brendan M. Morley	290	14.60
Conservative	June M. Eason	281	
Green	Julie Jackson	266	13.58
Registered electors		5,108	
Turnout		1991	38.98
Rejected ballots		8	0.40
Labour hold			
Labour hold			

=== South ===
South (3)
Party	Candidate	Votes	%
Liberal Democrats	Alec J. Kellaway*	1,661	34.39
Labour	Thomas A. Jenkinson*	1,505	33.81
Labour	Alexander Thomson^{†} (Note: Alexander was a councillor for Plaistow ward)	1,415	
Liberal Democrats	Stephen T. Bell	1,357	
Conservative	Damian P. J. Sutton	1,338	31.80
Labour	Neil J. Wilson	1,323	
Conservative	Laurence B. Springthorpe	1,322	
Liberal Democrats	Paul R. Willett	1,269	
Registered electors		11,025	
Turnout		4277	38.79
Rejected ballots		12	0.29
Liberal Democrats hold			
Labour hold			
Labour hold			

=== Stratford ===
Stratford (2)
Party	Candidate	Votes	%
Labour	James C. Riley*	937	54.35
Labour	James G. Newstead*	936	
Conservative	William G. Flynn	314	16.71
Liberal Democrats	Martin P. J. Edwardes	281	16.30
Conservative	Armyn Hennessy	262	
Green	Charles F. Seber	218	12.64
Registered electors		4,994	
Turnout		1640	32.84
Rejected ballots		9	0.55
Labour hold			
Labour hold			

=== Upton ===
Upton (3)
Party	Candidate	Votes	%
Labour	Mian M. Aslam*	1,827	66.57
Labour	Shama Ahmad	1,780	
Labour	Andrew P. Zachariades	1,702	
Conservative	Christine M. Hodgson	517	17.30
Conservative	Simon J. L. Linford	450	
Green	Anthony R. Kelly	429	16.13
Conservative	John Lowry	412	
Registered electors		7,590	
Turnout		2601	34.27
Rejected ballots		13	0.50
Labour hold			
Labour hold			
Labour hold			

=== Wall End ===
Wall End (3)
Party	Candidate	Votes	%
Labour	Sarah J. Reeves*	1,888	55.26
Labour	Theodore L. Etherden*	1,827	
Labour	Bashir Ul-Hafeez*	1,564	
Conservative	Alexander G. Hope-Thomson	892	27.38
Conservative	Peter J. Doe	879	
Conservative	Henry J. F. Prendergast	846	
Green	Nicholas Oakes	553	17.36
Registered electors		8,254	
Turnout		3187	38.61
Rejected ballots		18	0.56
Labour hold			
Labour hold			
Labour hold			

=== West Ham ===
West Ham (2)
Party	Candidate	Votes	%
Labour	Ronald N. Manley*	1,116	60.83
Labour	James E. Goodman	1,052	
Conservative	Kelvin C. V. McWilton	445	22.33
Conservative	Luigi Peluso	351	
Green	Richard H. Thomas	300	16.84
Registered electors		5,742	
Turnout		1815	31.61
Rejected ballots		15	0.83
Labour hold			
Labour hold			
