= 1968 Newham London Borough Council election =

Elections to Newham London Borough Council were held on 9 May 1968. The whole council was up for election. Turnout was 22.8%.

Following the election, Labour had 30 councillors out of 60. Five Labour aldermen had been elected at the preceding election, with terms running until 1971. At the first council meeting following the election, five more Labour aldermen were elected, leaving the council in Labour hands again.

== Background ==
A total of 145 candidates stood in the election for the 60 seats being contested across 24 wards. 2 seats in one ward had only 2 candidates, thus they were both elected unopposed. Candidates included a full slate from the Labour party, while the Liberal and Conservative parties stood 20 and 27 respectively. Other candidates included 26 Residents & Ratepayers, 6 Communists and 4 Independents.

== Election result ==
Newham local election result 1968
Party	Seats	Gains	Losses	Net gain/loss	Seats %	Votes %	Votes	+/−
Labour	30	1	21	-20	50.0	40.5		
Other parties	21	14	0	+14	35.0	36.0		
Conservative	6	6	0	+6	10.0	17.2		
Liberal	3	1	1	0	5.0	6.3		

== Results by ward ==
=== Beckton ===
Beckton (2)
Party	Candidate	Votes	%	±%
Labour	H.A. Taylor	384	70.1	−15.5
Labour	L.A. Wood	358		N/A
Communist	R.A. Offley	164	29.9	+22.5
Turnout			14.1	−6.0
Registered electors		4,253		
Labour hold		Swing		
Labour hold		Swing		

=== Bemersyde ===
Bemersyde (2)
Party	Candidate	Votes	%	±%
Labour	F.H. Ferrier	1,109	52.7	−16.6
Labour	H. Bauckham	1,101		N/A
Residents	L.A. Slade	995	47.3	N/A
Residents	J.J. Ling	992		N/A
Turnout			35.8	+0.1
Registered electors		6,018		
Labour hold		Swing		
Labour hold		Swing		

=== Canning Town & Grange ===
Canning Town and Grange (2)
Party	Candidate	Votes	%	±%
Labour	C.L. Bock	0	N/A	N/A
Labour	D.A. Sherman	0	N/A	N/A
Turnout		0	N/A	N/A
Registered electors		6,208		
Labour hold		Swing		
Labour hold		Swing		

=== Castle ===
Castle (2)
Party	Candidate	Votes	%	±%
Residents	H.W. Hennem	1,450	68.7	+21.1
Residents	J.M. King	1,447		N/A
Labour	A.C. Smith	458	21.7	−28.9
Labour	A.R. Miller	421		N/A
National Front	J.B. Newham	111	5.3	N/A
Independent	S.T. Conway	52	2.5	N/A
Communist	F.C. Farmer	39	1.8	+0.0
Turnout			36.7	−3.3
Registered electors		5,601		
Residents gain from Labour		Swing		
Residents gain from Labour		Swing		

=== Central ===
Central (2)
Party	Candidate	Votes	%	±%
Residents	M.B. Layton	973	48.9	N/A
Residents	A. Macfarlane	949		N/A
Labour	J.R. Kent	596	29.9	−45.6
Labour	J.C. Taylor	563		N/A
Conservative	A.J. Retter	421	21.2	N/A
Conservative	J.W. Retter	393		N/A
Turnout			33.3	+8.5
Registered electors		6,098		
Residents gain from Labour		Swing		
Residents gain from Labour		Swing		

=== Custom House & Silvertown ===
Custom House and Silvertown (3)
Party	Candidate	Votes	%	±%
Labour	W. Dunlop	626	72.7	−3.0
Labour	T.W. Miller	589		N/A
Labour	P.F. Newman	571		N/A
Communist	T.F. Church	235	27.3	+23.6
Turnout			11.2	−10.8
Registered electors		8,418		
Labour hold		Swing		
Labour hold		Swing		
Labour hold		Swing		

=== Forest Gate ===
Forest Gate (3)
Party	Candidate	Votes	%	±%
Conservative	T.W. Orrin	1,107	48.5	+32.2
Conservative	V.A. Shearman	1,090		N/A
Conservative	A.R. Summers	1,070		N/A
Labour	F.G. White	782	34.3	−24.7
Labour	T.H. Camp	763		N/A
Labour	S.W. Whitear	739		N/A
Liberal	W.F. Sargent	394	17.3	−5.1
Liberal	R.P. McCarthy	376		N/A
Liberal	E.L. Andrews	336		N/A
Turnout			26.4	+0.6
Registered electors		9,086		
Conservative gain from Labour		Swing		
Conservative gain from Labour		Swing		
Conservative gain from Labour		Swing		

=== Greatfield ===
Greatfield (3)
Party	Candidate	Votes	%	±%
Residents	S.G. Ling	2,667	76.5	+27.4
Residents	M.J. Talbot	2,615		N/A
Residents	F.G. Hammond	2,565		N/A
Labour	M. Philpott	817	23.5	−19.9
Labour	P. Haggerty	733		N/A
Labour	I. Green	692		N/A
Turnout			39.4	−10.0
Registered electors		8,993		
Residents hold		Swing		
Residents hold		Swing		
Residents hold		Swing		

=== Hudsons ===
Hudsons (3)
Party	Candidate	Votes	%	±%
Labour	M. Davidson	791	62.3	−21.0
Labour	J.E. Griffin	775		N/A
Labour	H.E. Fitzsimons	764		N/A
Conservative	P.W. Sims	479	37.7	N/A
Conservative	E.K. Knight	472		N/A
Turnout			16.4	−8.1
Registered electors		8,310		
Labour hold		Swing		
Labour hold		Swing		
Labour hold		Swing		

=== Kensington ===
Kensington (2)
Party	Candidate	Votes	%	±%
Residents	E. Lonsdale	1,410	76.8	+23.2
Residents	H.J. Ringrow	1,388		N/A
Labour	D.M. Davey	427	23.2	−15.5
Labour	J. Cuffe	409		N/A
Turnout			31.1	−13.9
Registered electors		5,993		
Residents hold		Swing		
Residents hold		Swing		

=== Little Ilford ===
Little Ilford (3)
Party	Candidate	Votes	%	±%
Residents	M.E. Pedley	940	49.8	N/A
Residents	C. Miranda	929		N/A
Residents	R.P. Anderson	840		N/A
Labour	W.E. Hurford	648	34.3	−39.5
Labour	H.F. Lugg	631		N/A
Labour	M.E. Helps	614		N/A
Liberal	S. Temple	112	5.9	−12.7
Liberal	S.G. Avis	99		N/A
Communist	L.E. Brown	97	5.1	−2.6
Independent	M. Flaherty	92	4.9	N/A
Liberal	H. Mason	85		N/A
Turnout			23.8	+0.4
Registered electors		7,826		
Residents gain from Labour		Swing		
Residents gain from Labour		Swing		
Residents gain from Labour		Swing		

=== Manor Park ===
Manor Park (3)
Party	Candidate	Votes	%	±%
Conservative	C.A. Rugg	1,577	65.5	+35.0
Conservative	C.L. Retter	1,544		N/A
Conservative	B.C. Balcomb	1,354		N/A
Labour	R.C. Beadle	831	34.5	−10.7
Labour	W.M. Knight	805		N/A
Labour	R.R. Turville	789		N/A
Turnout			27.2	−7.2
Registered electors		9,360		
Conservative gain from Labour		Swing		
Conservative gain from Labour		Swing		
Conservative gain from Labour		Swing		

=== New Town ===
New Town (2)
Party	Candidate	Votes	%	±%
Labour	N.A. Chubb	505	53.0	−30.0
Liberal	J.W. Francis	448	47.0	+30.0
Labour	S. Hopwood	442		N/A
Turnout			16.7	−4.5
Registered electors		5,757		
Labour hold		Swing		
Liberal gain from Labour		Swing		

=== Ordnance ===
Ordnance (2)
Party	Candidate	Votes	%	±%
Labour	A.E. Gannon	356	62.8	−16.3
Labour	F.J. Radley	350		N/A
Liberal	K. McGrane	211	37.2	+16.3
Turnout			11.3	+10.7
Registered electors		5,234		
Labour hold		Swing		
Labour hold		Swing		

=== Park ===
Park (3)
Party	Candidate	Votes	%	±%
Labour	A. Wolffe	1,203	51.4	−13.5
Labour	H. Ronan	1,117		N/A
Labour	K. Hasler	1,092		N/A
Conservative	R.J. Blake	650	27.8	N/A
Conservative	G. Eldridge	640		N/A
Conservative	B.J. Hunt	575		N/A
Liberal	M. Hogan	366	15.6	−19.5
Liberal	A. Bijl-Jarvis	364		N/A
Liberal	J.W. Giles	354		N/A
Independent	A.C. O'Hanlon	120	5.2	N/A
Turnout			23.2	−8.3
Registered electors		10,131		
Labour hold		Swing		
Labour hold		Swing		
Labour hold		Swing		

=== Plaistow ===
Plaistow (3)
Party	Candidate	Votes	%	±%
Residents	M.L. Finch	807	57.2	N/A
Residents	A. Elliott	769		N/A
Labour	P.K. O'Connell	604	42.8	−40.7
Labour	A. Bigg	591		N/A
Labour	K.M. Webb	559		N/A
Turnout			16.1	+2.3
Registered electors		8,874		
Residents gain from Labour		Swing		
Residents gain from Labour		Swing		
Labour hold		Swing		

=== Plashet ===
Plashet (3)
Party	Candidate	Votes	%	±%
Labour	J.C. Carter	1,318	52.7	−10.3
Labour	A.F. Wilson	1,279		N/A
Labour	W. Watts	1,160		N/A
Conservative	R.T. Hunt	649	26.0	+18.1
Conservative	C.A. Knight	636		N/A
Conservative	V.R. Miller	582		N/A
Liberal	D.E. Watts	390	15.6	−13.5
Liberal	J.F. Watts	300		N/A
Liberal	J. Wren	286		N/A
Independent	M.R. Neighbour	142	5.7	N/A
Turnout			26.5	−3.1
Registered electors		9,283		
Labour hold		Swing		
Labour hold		Swing		
Labour hold		Swing		

=== St Stephens ===
St Stephens (2)
Party	Candidate	Votes	%	±%
Residents	J. Hucker	1,347	70.2	+21.2
Residents	R.J. Smith	1,296		N/A
Labour	W.H. Brown	573	29.8	−12.9
Labour	F.J. Dowling	572		N/A
Turnout			33.0	−9.0
Registered electors		6,027		
Residents hold		Swing		
Residents hold		Swing		

=== South ===
South (3)
Party	Candidate	Votes	%	±%
Labour	H.J. Fisher	1,263	51.8	N/A
Labour	T.A. Jenkinson	1,199		N/A
Labour	E. Daly	1,162		N/A
Conservative	R.F. Hunter	706	29.0	N/A
Conservative	G.L. Crocker	665		N/A
Conservative	T.H. Beach	651		N/A
Residents	W. Bird	468	19.2	N/A
Residents	A.M. Cameron	456		N/A
Residents	E.T. Keeffe	431		N/A
Turnout			25.7	N/A
Registered electors		9,968		
Labour hold		Swing		
Labour hold		Swing		
Labour hold		Swing		

=== Stratford ===
Stratford (2)
Party	Candidate	Votes	%	±%
Labour	H.W. Doran	440	53.1	−21.3
Labour	E.G. Goodyer	399		N/A
Conservative	E.W. Orrin	186	22.5	N/A
Conservative	M.E. Fitch	182		N/A
Communist	T.C. Bowers	79	9.6	N/A
National Front	S. Wade	73	8.8	N/A
Liberal	J.J. Linehan	50	6.0	−9.0
Liberal	S.F. Wrightson	43		N/A
Turnout			16.3	−2.3
Registered electors		5,072		
Labour hold		Swing		
Labour hold		Swing		

=== Upton ===
Upton (3)
Party	Candidate	Votes	%	±%
Liberal	B.G. McCarthy	837	36.2	−11.7
Liberal	F.P. Penfold	767		N/A
Labour	E. Kebbell	764	33.1	−8.1
Labour	G.S. Figg	763		N/A
Liberal	E. Wren	760		N/A
Labour	S.H. Smith	718		N/A
Conservative	J.D. Inglis	710	30.7	+19.9
Conservative	W.L. Orrin	676		N/A
Conservative	C.W. Balcomb	675		N/A
Turnout			24.8	−6.3
Registered electors		9,899		
Liberal hold		Swing		
Liberal hold		Swing		
Labour gain from Liberal		Swing		

=== Wall End ===
Wall End (3)
Party	Candidate	Votes	%	±%
Residents	J.S. Bailey	1,666	48.7	+16.2
Residents	G.L. Bendall	1,654		N/A
Residents	M. Lay	1,618		N/A
Labour	E.M. Devenay	959	28.0	−20.3
Labour	S.A. Elson	863		N/A
Labour	H.T. Philpott	812		N/A
Conservative	I. Little	622	18.3	N/A
Conservative	M.H. Robinson	612		N/A
Conservative	R.P. Candler	593		N/A
Communist	D.A. Brett	172	5.0	−4.2
Turnout			38.1	+4.3
Registered electors		8,830		
Residents gain from Labour		Swing		
Residents gain from Labour		Swing		
Residents gain from Labour		Swing		

=== West Ham ===
West Ham (2)
Party	Candidate	Votes	%	±%
Labour	J.F. Andrews	432	62.5	−17.1
Labour	D.W. Lee	427		N/A
Liberal	J. Andrews	259	37.5	+22.4
Turnout			11.9	−6.9
Registered electors		6,003		
Labour hold		Swing		
Labour hold		Swing		

=== Woodgrange ===
Woodgrange (2)
Party	Candidate	Votes	%	±%
Residents	A.N. Knight	1,256	70.4	+39.7
Residents	G.W. Brown	1,248		N/A
Labour	D. Harris	527	29.6	−11.9
Labour	S.H. Mail	499		N/A
Turnout			30.9	−5.4
Registered electors		5,892		
Residents gain from Labour		Swing		
Residents gain from Labour		Swing		

== By-elections between 1968 and 1971 ==
=== West Ham ===
West Ham by-election, 6 February 1969
Party	Candidate	Votes	%	±%
Labour	T. H. Camp	613	44.9	−17.6
Conservative	R. J. Blake	275	20.2	N/A
Residents	J. P. Davis	188	13.8	N/A
Liberal	J. W. Giles	146	10.7	−26.8
National Front	J. B. Newham	142	10.4	N/A
Majority		338	24.7	N/A
Turnout			22.4	+10.5
Registered electors				
Labour hold		Swing		

=== South ===
South by-election, 4 June 1970
Party	Candidate	Votes	%	±%
Labour	J. C. Taylor	1,164	74.9	−6.4
Conservative	A. J. Retter	373	24.0	+5.3
National Front	W. T. Anderson	17	1.1	N/A
Majority		791	50.9	N/A
Turnout			15.3	−14.4
Registered electors				
Labour hold		Swing		
