= 1986 Newham London Borough Council election =

1986 local election in England

The 1986 Newham Council election for the Newham London Borough Council was held on 8 May 1986. The whole council was up for election. Turnout was 30.7%. Labour, for the first time, won all 60 seats.

== Election result ==
Newham local election result 1986
Party	Seats	Gains	Losses	Net gain/loss	Seats %	Votes %	Votes	+/−
Labour	60	6	0	+6	100.0	60.7		
Conservative	0	0	0	0	0.0	16.5		
Alliance	0	0	6	-6	0.0	21.7		
Other parties	0	0	0	0	0.0	1.1		

== Background ==
A total of 184 candidates stood in the election for the 60 seats being contested across 24 wards. Candidates included a full slate from the Labour party, whilst the Conservative party stood 51 candidates. The Liberal and SDP parties ran 37 joint candidates whilst the Liberal party also ran 11 candidates under the Liberal Alliance Focus Team banner. Other candidates included 12 Independents, 8 Green, 1 Communist, 2 Revolutionary Communist and 2 National Front.

== Results by ward ==
=== Beckton ===
Beckton (2)
Party	Candidate	Votes	%	±%
Labour	Maureen Knight	693	70.4	−2.8
Labour	Derek A. Whitbread	637		N/A
Alliance	Suzan E. Statter	158	16.0	−10.8
Conservative	Gladys V. Smith	134	26.8	N/A
Alliance	Louis Pampouris	119		N/A
Turnout			22.5	+0.9
Registered electors		4,219		
Labour hold		Swing		
Labour hold		Swing		

=== Bemersyde ===
Bemersyde (2)
Party	Candidate	Votes	%	±%
Labour	John P. Lang	806	47.5	−9.4
Labour	Peter E. Landman	770		N/A
Alliance	Adrian G. Cole	592	34.9	−8.2
Alliance	Lee Reeves	59		N/A
Conservative	Ian R. Martin	298	17.6	N/A
Conservative	Susan G. Martin	254		N/A
Turnout			38.3	+8.9
Registered electors		4,616		
Labour hold		Swing		
Labour hold		Swing		

=== Canning Town & Grange ===
Canning Town & Grange (2)
Party	Candidate	Votes	%	±%
Labour	Jack A. Hart	1,058	67.5	−6.6
Labour	Charles Whincup	1,022		N/A
Alliance	Mark H. Harrington	367	21.1	−11.4
Conservative	Peter J. Doe	256	14.7	N/A
Independent (Newham Broad Alliance)	Mohanlal D. Chouhan	56	3.2	N/A
Turnout			26.5	−4.4
Registered electors		5,847		
Labour hold		Swing		
Labour hold		Swing		

=== Castle ===
Castle (2)
Party	Candidate	Votes	%	±%
Labour	Edwin R. Mann	1,224	58.7	−3.7
Labour	Sarah L. M. Murray	1,207		N/A
Alliance	Peter Bragg	566	27.2	−10.4
Alliance	Lamont M. Moyer	439		N/A
Conservative	Helena D. Bernstein	294	14.1	N/A
Turnout			39.1	+8.4
Registered electors		5,589		
Labour hold		Swing		
Labour hold		Swing		

=== Central ===
Central (2)
Party	Candidate	Votes	%	±%
Labour	Gordon T. George	1,257	54.0	+0.9
Labour	Stanley Hopwood	1,219		N/A
Alliance	Harbans S. Jabbal	369	36.3	−20.2
Conservative	Lesley M. Fitzgerald	360	15.7	N/A
Independent (Newham Broad Alliance)	Mohammad Sarawar	302	13.2	N/A
Turnout			38.0	+1.3
Registered electors		5,475		
Labour hold		Swing		
Labour hold		Swing		

=== Custom House & Silvertown ===
Custom House & Silvertown (3)
Party	Candidate	Votes	%	±%
Labour	William A. Chapman	1,350	64.8	+3.0
Labour	Julia C. I. Garfield	1,334		N/A
Labour	Judith A. Jorsling-Thomas	1,221		N/A
Alliance	Elizabeth Campion	394	18.9	−19.3
Alliance	David J. Richardson	390		N/A
Alliance	Sandra Y. Richardson	383		N/A
Conservative	June P. L. Colton	338	16.2	N/A
Conservative	June M. Eason	334		N/A
Conservative	Erica H. Privett	319		N/A
Turnout			27.2	+3.5
Registered electors		8,285		
Labour hold		Swing		
Labour hold		Swing		
Labour hold		Swing		

=== Forest Gate ===
Forest Gate (3)
Party	Candidate	Votes	%	±%
Labour	Margaret P. Olley	1,566	55.0	+15.0
Labour	Conor M. McAuley	1,550		N/A
Labour	Ronald G. Augley	1,524		N/A
Conservative	Richard J. Arnopp	669	23.5	−0.8
Conservative	Robin D. Atter	659		N/A
Conservative	John B. M. Steinberg	575		N/A
Lib Dem Focus Team	David C. Powell	286	10.0	−22.7
Lib Dem Focus Team	Anne Butcher	277		N/A
Lib Dem Focus Team	Mark A. Tavener	256		N/A
Green	Varyah A. de Grandis-Harrison	200	7.0	N/A
Revolutionary Communist	Alex Farrell	66	2.3	N/A
Communist	John G. Grahl	60	2.1	N/A
Turnout			37.4	+8.7
Registered electors		7,603		
Labour hold		Swing		
Labour hold		Swing		
Labour hold		Swing		

=== Greatfield ===
Greatfield (3)
Party	Candidate	Votes	%	±%
Labour	Jeffrey Crooks	1,410	39.8	−1.2
Labour	Kevin J. Jenkins	1,322		N/A
Labour	Martin J Watkinson	1,258		N/A
Alliance	Neal A. Chubb	1,022	28.9	−30.1
Alliance	David Gotobe	1,019		N/A
Alliance	Leslie E. Groombridge	878		N/A
Conservative	Robert J. Vinter	810	22.9	N/A
Conservative	Steven P. Nash	790		N/A
Conservative	Rosa E. Gurney	781		N/A
National Front	Michael B. Hipperson	199	5.6	N/A
National Front	Peter J. Turpin	153		N/A
Green	Ian C. Macdonald	99	2.8	N/A
Turnout			41.1	+8.4
Registered electors		8,545		
Labour gain from Alliance		Swing		
Labour gain from Alliance		Swing		
Labour gain from Alliance		Swing		

=== Hudsons ===
Hudsons (3)
Party	Candidate	Votes	%	±%
Labour	Frederick C. Jones	1,173	57.1	−3.9
Labour	Margaret D. Brown	1,035		N/A
Labour	Graham J. Lane	992		N/A
Alliance	Stephen T. Bell	481	23.4	−5.3
Alliance	Martin J. Lammin	410		N/A
Conservative	Josephine M. Child	401	19.5	−0.1
Alliance	Ann C. Winfield	60		N/A
Conservative	Alexander G. Hope-Thompson	360		N/A
Conservative	Leslie A. Smith	350		N/A
Turnout			28.7	+2.0
Registered electors		7,527		
Labour hold		Swing		
Labour hold		Swing		
Labour hold		Swing		

=== Kensington ===
Kensington (2)
Party	Candidate	Votes	%	±%
Labour	Kenneth C. R. Massey	1,705	68.1	+8.7
Labour	Harmegh S. Rattan	1,576		N/A
Lib Dem Focus Team	Eric P. Laws	555	22.2	N/A
Lib Dem Focus Team	Sylvia E. Neal	443		N/A
Conservative	Doris E. McWilton	187	7.5	N/A
Green	Rosalind M. Shanley Jordaan	55	2.2	N/A
Turnout			44.0	+2.2
Registered electors		5,690		
Labour hold		Swing		
Labour hold		Swing		

=== Little Ilford ===
Little Ilford (3)
Party	Candidate	Votes	%	±%
Labour	Colin M. Copus	2,117	54.4	+11.7
Labour	Stephen C. Timms	1,021		N/A
Labour	Patricia A. Heron	931		N/A
Lib Dem Focus Team	Rif Winfield	1,477	38.0	−16.0
Lib Dem Focus Team	Thomas J. Humfrey	1,317		N/A
Lib Dem Focus Team	Clefene Skyers	1,291		N/A
Conservative	Roy A. Bull	296	7.6	N/A
Conservative	Gillian M. Stannett	275		N/A
Conservative	Mark W. Money	255		N/A
Turnout			47.9	+15.7
Registered electors		8,217		
Labour gain from Lib Dem Focus Team		Swing		
Labour gain from Lib Dem Focus Team		Swing		
Labour gain from Lib Dem Focus Team		Swing		

=== Manor Park ===
Manor Park (3)
Party	Candidate	Votes	%	±%
Labour	Amarjit Singh	1,665	54.9	+5.3
Labour	James A. Parnell	1,651		N/A
Labour	Elizabeth C. Fullick	1,651		N/A
Lib Dem Focus Team	June M. Gasper	825	27.2	N/A
Lib Dem Focus Team	Philip C. Wainewright	716		N/A
Lib Dem Focus Team	Mohammed A. Siddiqui	674		N/A
Conservative	Douglas E. G. Webb	541	17.8	−10.8
Conservative	Martin Bayes	528		N/A
Conservative	Mary M. King	524		N/A
Turnout			40.1	+3.8
Registered electors		8,164		
Labour hold		Swing		
Labour hold		Swing		
Labour hold		Swing		

=== Monega ===
Monega (2)
Party	Candidate	Votes	%	±%
Labour	Lewis E. Boyce	1,355	61.1	+3.1
Labour	Frederick E. York	1,266		N/A
Independent (Newham Broad Alliance)	Manoj K. Mann	573	25.9	N/A
Independent (Newham Broad Alliance)	Javad Rahman	486		N/A
Conservative	Wendy N. Blanchard	288	13.0	N/A
Turnout			38.5	+3.2
Registered electors		5,722		
Labour hold		Swing		
Labour hold		Swing		

=== New Town ===
New Town (2)
Party	Candidate	Votes	%	±%
Labour	Henry C. Cleghorn	921	66.9	+18.3
Labour	Peter J. Pendle	895		N/A
Conservative	David Knight	239	17.4	−4.9
Conservative	Florence Jackson	215		N/A
Alliance	Elizabeth Barker	159	11.6	−17.5
Alliance	Davinder S. Sagoo	127		N/A
Green	Paramjit S. Bahra	57	4.1	N/A
Turnout			29.5	+1.0
Registered electors		5,123		
Labour hold		Swing		
Labour hold		Swing		

=== Ordnance ===
Ordnance (2)
Party	Candidate	Votes	%	±%
Labour	Charles A. Flemwell	734	73.3	+1.5
Labour	Anne King	662		N/A
Alliance	Jennifer Sutherland	158	15.8	−12.4
Alliance	Francis J. Rowden	148		N/A
Conservative	Roger J. L. Ham	110	11.0	N/A
Turnout			26.2	+5.1
Registered electors		4,148		
Labour hold		Swing		
Labour hold		Swing		

=== Park ===
Park (3)
Party	Candidate	Votes	%	±%
Labour	Michael Brown	1,368	56.3	+6.0
Labour	John Lock	1,364		N/A
Labour	John Plant	1,239		N/A
Alliance	Andrew J. Bolton	437	18.0	−10.6
Alliance	Frances L. Bolton	436		N/A
Alliance	Mohammed T. Jawed	434		N/A
Conservative	Roger M. Barker-Green	408	16.8	−4.3
Conservative	Simon N. C. Pearce	405		N/A
Conservative	Richard C. Strauss	362		N/A
Green	Leo M. Fletcher	215	8.9	N/A
Turnout			32.8	+2.0
Registered electors		7,990		
Labour hold		Swing		
Labour hold		Swing		
Labour hold		Swing		

=== Plaistow ===
Plaistow (3)
Party	Candidate	Votes	%	±%
Labour	Christine Shepherd	1,118	63.1	−13.7
Labour	Alexander Thomson	1,047		N/A
Labour	Anand N. Patil	1,022		N/A
Alliance	Bridget A. Watts	355	20.0	+1.6
Conservative	Derek S. Vivash	298	16.8	N/A
Alliance	Ian W. F. Macfadyen	297		N/A
Conservative	Mary M. Vivash	256		N/A
Alliance	Mohammed Sarwar	228		N/A
Turnout			28.6	−1.1
Registered electors		6,795		
Labour hold		Swing		
Labour hold		Swing		
Labour hold		Swing		

=== Plashet ===
Plashet (3)
Party	Candidate	Votes	%	±%
Labour	Maganbhal G. Patel	1,442	40.1	+10.8
Labour	Jan Tallis	1,410		N/A
Labour	Joseph C. Sambrano	1,282		N/A
Conservative	Barry W. Roberts	520	18.3	−12.1
Conservative	Vera E. Ingleby	506		N/A
Conservative	Brendan M. Morley	485		N/A
Alliance	Terence R. J. Wells	472	16.6	−0.5
Alliance	Belboda J. B. Cooke	455		N/A
Independent (Newham Broad Alliance)	Abdul K. Sheikh	401	14.1	N/A
Turnout			33.4	−4.5
Registered electors		8,412		
Labour hold		Swing		
Labour hold		Swing		
Labour hold		Swing		

=== St Stephens ===
St Stephens (2)
Party	Candidate	Votes	%	±%
Labour	Thomas Nolan	1,279	67.1	+5.0
Labour	Linda A. Jordan	1,030		N/A
Independent (Newham Broad Alliance)	Ahmed S. Motala	360	18.9	N/A
Independent (Newham Broad Alliance)	Bahadur S. Gahir	321		N/A
Conservative	Barbara M. Sutton	268	14.1	N/A
Turnout			37.4	−3.0
Registered electors		5,298		
Labour hold		Swing		
Labour hold		Swing		

=== South ===
South (3)
Party	Candidate	Votes	%	±%
Labour	Edward F. Corbett	1,269	44.7	−5.4
Labour	Thomas A. Jenkinson	1,215		N/A
Labour	John Wilson	1,103		N/A
Conservative	Sean Cadogan	876	30.9	+2.9
Conservative	Craig J. P. Hands	874		N/A
Conservative	Damian P. J. Sutton	836		N/A
Alliance	James C. Evans	693	24.4	+2.5
Alliance	Alec J. Kellaway	659		N/A
Alliance	William A. Robinson	619		N/A
Turnout			33.7	+4.8
Registered electors		9,175		
Labour hold		Swing		
Labour hold		Swing		
Labour hold		Swing		

=== Stratford ===
Stratford (2)
Party	Candidate	Votes	%	±%
Labour	James C. Riley	769	61.5	+4.3
Labour	James C. Goldsmith	733		N/A
Conservative	William G. Flynn	228	18.2	−0.1
Alliance	Michael J. Hogan	203	16.2	−8.2
Conservative	Antoinette Tuthill	174		N/A
Alliance	Charmaine C. Pierre	167		N/A
Green	Paul Bridewell Mason	50	4.0	N/A
Turnout			26.6	+3.0
Registered electors		5,977		
Labour hold		Swing		
Labour hold		Swing		

=== Upton ===
Upton (3)
Party	Candidate	Votes	%	±%
Labour	John R. Clow	1,915	60.3	+1.7
Labour	Muhammad Aslam	1,710		N/A
Labour	Pamela Furness	1,695		N/A
Independent (Newham Broad Alliance)	Dilip Rana	585	18.4	N/A
Independent (Newham Broad Alliance)	Ahmed Din	569		N/A
Independent (Newham Broad Alliance)	Bhikhu B. Vara	417		N/A
Conservative	Marilyn Barker-Green	415	13.1	+2.1
Conservative	Anna Z. McWilton	324		N/A
Conservative	Kelvin C. V. McWilton	324		N/A
Green	Arthur L. Taylor	188	5.9	N/A
Revolutionary Communist	Kenan Malik	74	2.3	N/A
Turnout			37.2	+2.6
Registered electors		8,273		
Labour hold		Swing		
Labour hold		Swing		
Labour hold		Swing		

=== Wall End ===
Wall End (3)
Party	Candidate	Votes	%	±%
Labour	Theodore L. Etherden	1,568	47.5	+0.2
Labour	Sarah J. Reeves	1,552		N/A
Labour	Bashirul Hafeez	1,523		N/A
Conservative	Diane E. Harley	1,003	30.4	+0.9
Conservative	John P. R. Colthurst	988		N/A
Conservative	Anthony G. Moran	878		N/A
Alliance	Richard H. Lomas	431	13.0	−10.3
Independent (Newham Broad Alliance)	Piara Mehtab	302	9.1	N/A
Independent (Newham Broad Alliance)	Leon Netto	293		N/A
Turnout			39.5	+4.9
Registered electors		8,498		
Labour hold		Swing		
Labour hold		Swing		
Labour hold		Swing		

=== West Ham ===
West Ham (2)
Party	Candidate	Votes	%	±%
Labour	Ronald N. Manley	1,176	64.8	+10.4
Labour	John Isted	1,061		N/A
Conservative	Dennis F. Privett	328	18.1	−3.6
Conservative	Georgina Williams	258		N/A
Alliance	Victor Schofield	248	13.7	−10.2
Alliance	Leslie Sutherland	201		N/A
Green	Amanda J. Sandford	64	3.5	N/A
Turnout			30.9	+2.7
Registered electors		6,248		
Labour hold		Swing		
Labour hold		Swing		

== By-elections between 1986 and 1990 ==
=== South ===
South by-election, 5 February 1987
Party	Candidate	Votes	%	±%
Alliance	Alec J. Kellaway	1,000	37.8	+13.4
Labour	Doris A. Maxwell	805	30.5	−14.2
Conservative	Damian P. J. Sutton	769	29.1	−1.8
Green	Terence C. J. Macdonald	68	2.6	N/A
Majority		195	7.3	N/A
Turnout			28.7	−5.0
Registered electors		9,240		
Alliance gain from Labour		Swing		

The by-election was called following the resignation death of Cllr. John Wilson.

=== Little Ilford ===
Little Ilford by-election, 13 October 1988
Party	Candidate	Votes	%	±%
Labour	Lyn C. Brown	1,027	50.9	−3.5
Liberal Democrats	Leslie E. Groombridge	614	30.4	−7.6
Conservative	John P. R. Colthurst	324	16.0	+8.4
Independent	Dexter H. Hanoomansingh	54	2.7	N/A
Majority		413	20.5	N/A
Turnout			24.9	−23.0
Registered electors		8,112		
Labour hold		Swing		

The by-election was called following the resignation of Cllr. Colin M. Copus.

=== St Stephens ===
St Stephens by-election, 13 October 1988
Party	Candidate	Votes	%	±%
Labour	Catherine J. Parry	704	53.0	−14.1
Conservative	Charles R. P. G. Meaby	219	16.5	+2.4
Independent Labour	Baldev Barrah	214	16.1	N/A
SDP	Peter Bragg	143	10.7	N/A
Liberal Democrats	Matthew M. Huntbach	49	3.7	−20.7
Majority		485	36.5	N/A
Turnout			24.8	−12.6
Registered electors		5,365		
Labour hold		Swing		

The by-election was called following the death of Cllr. Thomas Nolan.

=== Plashet ===
Plashet by-election, 30 November 1989
Party	Candidate	Votes	%	±%
Labour	Mohammad K. Khawaja	801	52.0	+1.1
Conservative	Barry W. Roberts	385	25.0	+6.7
Green	Amanda J. Sandford	205	13.3	N/A
Liberal Democrats	Mohammed A. Siddiqui	149	9.7	−14.7
Majority		416	27.0	N/A
Turnout			18.8	−14.6
Registered electors		8,215		
Labour hold		Swing		

The by-election was called following the resignation of Cllr. Joseph C. Sambrano.
