= 1978 Newham London Borough Council election =

The 1978 Newham London Borough Council election for the Newham London Borough Council was held on 4 May 1978. The whole council was up for election. Turnout was 26.8%. The Liberal Party didn't stand in the elections. The Labour Party held onto its overwhelming majority.

== Election result ==
Newham local election result 1978
Party	Seats	Gains	Losses	Net gain/loss	Seats %	Votes %	Votes	+/−
Labour	57	6	0	+6		62.5		
Conservative	0	0	0	0		18.0		
Other parties	3	0	6	-6		19.5		

== Background ==
A total of 161 candidates stood in the election for the 60 seats being contested across 24 wards. Candidates included a full slate from the Labour Party, whilst the Conservative Party ran 33 candidates. Other candidates included 48 Residents & Ratepayers, 1 Communist and 16 National Front.

== Results by ward ==
=== Beckton ===
Beckton (2)
Party	Candidate	Votes	%	±%
Labour	Herbert Taylor	1,215	82.2	−9.0
Labour	Derek Whitbread	1,132		N/A
National Front	David Newman	178	12.0	N/A
National Front	Frederick Adams	144		N/A
Residents	Ruth Lawrence	85	5.8	N/A
Residents	Gladys Potter	79		N/A
Turnout			28.6	+9.2
Registered electors		5,529		
Labour hold		Swing		
Labour hold		Swing		

=== Bemersyde ===
Bemersyde (2)
Party	Candidate	Votes	%	±%
Labour	Harry Bauckham	1,009	75.6	+4.7
Labour	William Dunlop	903		N/A
Residents	Joan W. F. Vine	326	24.4	N/A
Residents	Clarice I. Youngman	313		N/A
Turnout			26.6	+0.8
Registered electors		5,297		
Labour hold		Swing		
Labour hold		Swing		

=== Canning Town & Grange ===
Canning Town & Grange (2)
Party	Candidate	Votes	%	±%
Labour	Jack A. Hart	1,563	78.3	+2.9
Labour	Michael G. Mecham	1,398		N/A
National Front	Maurice L. Baker	222	11.1	−13.5
Residents	Patricia M. Parr	212	10.6	N/A
Residents	Brenda A. Lineker	187		N/A
Turnout			29.4	+12.8
Registered electors		6,840		
Labour hold		Swing		
Labour hold		Swing		

=== Castle ===
Castle (2)
Party	Candidate	Votes	%	±%
Labour	Margaret D. Brown	1,092	54.7	+14.1
Labour	Herbert G. Simpson	1,040		N/A
Residents	Alfred W. King	905	45.3	−14.1
Residents	Sylvia M. L. Jones	895		N/A
Turnout			25.2	+10.4
Registered electors		6,151		
Labour gain from Residents		Swing		
Labour gain from Residents		Swing		

=== Central ===
Central (2)
Party	Candidate	Votes	%	±%
Labour	Sidney A. Elson	1,305	62.0	+5.6
Labour	Henry E. L. Ronan	1,098		N/A
Residents	Margaret B. Layton	598	28.4	−12.2
Residents	Herbert H. Martin	573		N/A
National Front	Diane J. Bell	202	9.6	N/A
National Front	Gloria Kestla	171		N/A
Turnout			35.9	+12.9
Registered electors		6,232		
Labour hold		Swing		
Labour hold		Swing		

=== Custom House & Silvertown ===
Custom House & Silvertown (3)
Party	Candidate	Votes	%	±%
Labour	William A. Chapman	1,370	83.0	+9.2
Labour	Julia C. I. Garfield	1,275		N/A
Labour	Thomas A. Jenkinson	1,186		N/A
Residents	Irene D. King	281	17.0	N/A
Residents	Leslie L. Pridham	239		N/A
Residents	Ronald Youngman	223		N/A
Turnout			23.4	+4.8
Registered electors		8,326		
Labour hold		Swing		
Labour hold		Swing		
Labour hold		Swing		

=== Forest Gate ===
Forest Gate (3)
Party	Candidate	Votes	%	±%
Labour	Stanley Hopwood	1,469	58.3	−1.8
Labour	Kevin R. Mansell	1,383		N/A
Labour	Marjorie E. Helps	1,242		N/A
Conservative	David A. Amess	957	38.0	+14.2
Conservative	Emily J. Short	838		N/A
Conservative	Luigi Peluso	820		N/A
Residents	Edward A. Fisher	92	3.7	N/A
Residents	Dorothy Collier	87		N/A
Residents	Gladys L. Bendall	86		N/A
Turnout			28.7	+6.1
Registered electors		9,290		
Labour hold		Swing		
Labour hold		Swing		
Labour hold		Swing		

=== Greatfield ===
Greatfield (3)
Party	Candidate	Votes	%	±%
Residents	Herbert Castle	1,759	46.6	−9.6
Residents	Edwin G. Ray	1,685		N/A
Residents	Lesley Hall	1,634		N/A
Labour	Paul J. Charman	1,171	31.0	−2.3
Labour	James W. Middleton	1,091		N/A
Labour	Louis G. Fox	1,086		N/A
Conservative	William G. Bell	846	22.4	+11.9
Conservative	David C. Moor	731		N/A
Conservative	Joseph T. Smith	730		N/A
Turnout			41.6	+10.5
Registered electors		9,188		
Residents hold		Swing		
Residents hold		Swing		
Residents hold		Swing		

=== Hudsons ===
Hudsons (3)
Party	Candidate	Votes	%	±%
Labour	Frederick J. Dance	1,261	61.0	−10.9
Labour	Frederick C. Jones	1,234		N/A
Labour	Harold E. Fitzsimons	1,185		N/A
Conservative	Edward J. Oakes	416	20.1	N/A
Conservative	Ethel A. Gibbons	384		N/A
Conservative	Doris C. Neville	373		N/A
Residents	Benjamin J. Davis	217	10.5	N/A
National Front	Sydney H. Palmer	172	8.3	−19.8
Residents	Joan E. Lakey	69		N/A
Residents	Edward J. Oakes	60		N/A
Turnout			26.6	−3.8
Registered electors		8,194		
Labour hold		Swing		
Labour hold		Swing		
Labour hold		Swing		

=== Kensington ===
Kensington (2)
Party	Candidate	Votes	%	±%
Labour	Kenneth C. Massey	1,387	54.8	+1.3
Labour	John J. Plant	1,277		N/A
Residents	Eric A. R. Lonsdale	1,078	42.6	−3.9
Residents	David A. Williams	1,052		N/A
Communist	John G. Grahl	67	2.6	N/A
Turnout			44.1	+13.7
Registered electors		6,245		
Labour gain from Residents		Swing		
Labour gain from Residents		Swing		

=== Little Ilford ===
Little Ilford (3)
Party	Candidate	Votes	%	±%
Labour	William H. Brown	1,328	66.7	+5.5
Labour	Yvonne P. Clayden	1,317		N/A
Labour	John A. Kemp	1,268		N/A
Residents	Nicholas J. Biggadike	568	28.5	+1.6
Residents	John P. Davis	529		N/A
Residents	James D. Smith	482		N/A
Workers Revolutionary	Michael A. Probin	96	4.8	N/A
Turnout			19.1	+8.8
Registered electors		8,532		
Labour hold		Swing		
Labour hold		Swing		
Labour hold		Swing		

=== Manor Park ===
Manor Park (3)
Party	Candidate	Votes	%	±%
Labour	Christopher J. Palme	1,667	53.1	−4.3
Labour	Mildred A. Schofield	1,613		N/A
Labour	Amarjit Singh	1,567		N/A
Conservative	Henry J. F. Prendergast	1,224	39.0	+9.3
Conservative	Cyril A. Rugg	1,146		N/A
Conservative	Michael J. Trebess	1,095		N/A
National Front	William J. Roberts	246	7.8	N/A
National Front	Donald S. Simons	233		N/A
National Front	Alan Pooley	221		N/A
Turnout			37.8	+14.0
Registered electors		9,162		
Labour hold		Swing		
Labour hold		Swing		
Labour hold		Swing		

=== Monega ===
Monega (2)
Party	Candidate	Votes	%	±%
Labour	Adrian N. P. Hall	1,268	55.6	N/A
Labour	Frederick E. York	1,160		N/A
National Front	Michael R. Morris	350	15.3	N/A
Conservative	Judith A. Warner	348	15.3	N/A
Residents	George V. S. Nottage	315	13.8	N/A
Conservative	Ahmed E. Oomerjee	273		N/A
Residents	Edward T. Jones	173		N/A
National Front	Timothy S. Bennett	155		N/A
Turnout			36.4	N/A
Registered electors		5,830		
Labour hold		Swing		
Labour hold		Swing		

=== New Town ===
New Town (2)
Party	Candidate	Votes	%	±%
Labour	Margaret P. Olley	943	67.8	N/A
Labour	Ernest A. Stanton	919		N/A
Conservative	Barry W. Roberts	403	29.0	N/A
Conservative	William J. Button	388		N/A
Residents	Frederick Fletcher	44	3.2	N/A
Residents	Simon V. McDonald	42		N/A
Turnout			28.0	N/A
Registered electors		5,369		
Labour hold		Swing		
Labour hold		Swing		

=== Ordnance ===
Ordnance (2)
Party	Candidate	Votes	%	±%
Labour	David J. Brand	924	84.8	+9.1
Labour	Charles A. Flemwell	816		N/A
Residents	Francis C. Nicholson	166	15.2	N/A
Residents	Christopher E. Parr	130		N/A
Turnout			22.7	N/A
Registered electors		5,093		
Labour hold		Swing		
Labour hold		Swing		

=== Park ===
Park (3)
Party	Candidate	Votes	%	±%
Labour	Ann Howlett	1,369	65.4	N/A
Labour	James G. Newstead	1,331		N/A
Labour	Sidney H. Smith	1,319		N/A
Conservative	Gerard Eldridge	723	34.6	N/A
Conservative	Bernard Brick	663		N/A
Conservative	Roger M. Barker-Green	633		N/A
Turnout			25.4	N/A
Registered electors		9,221		
Labour hold		Swing		
Labour hold		Swing		
Labour hold		Swing		

=== Plaistow ===
Plaistow (3)
Party	Candidate	Votes	%	±%
Labour	Arthur F. G. Edwards	1,177	61.2	−3.6
Labour	Michael Allum	1,149		N/A
Labour	John J. Haggerty	1,110		N/A
Residents	Michael L. Finch	745	38.8	+3.6
Residents	Stanley Vine	524		N/A
Residents	Eleanor G. Walker	515		N/A
Turnout			27.5	+4.7
Registered electors		7,820		
Labour hold		Swing		
Labour hold		Swing		
Labour hold		Swing		

=== Plashet ===
Plashet (3)
Party	Candidate	Votes	%	±%
Labour	Bill Watts	1,994	75.2	−10.5
Labour	Arthur F. Wilson	1,900		N/A
Labour	Ernest Billups	1,794		N/A
Conservative	Ronald T. Hunt	658	24.8	+10.5
Conservative	David R. Ratcliffe	607		N/A
Conservative	Dennis F. Privett	602		N/A
Turnout			32.0	+9.8
Registered electors		9,371		
Labour hold		Swing		
Labour hold		Swing		
Labour hold		Swing		

=== St Stephens ===
St Stephens (2)
Party	Candidate	Votes	%	±%
Labour	Thomas Nolan	1,362	57.9	+9.6
Labour	Kenneth Palmer	793		N/A
Residents	Sylvia V. King	991	42.1	−9.6
Residents	Rhona J. Smith	865		N/A
Turnout			40.4	+11.1
Registered electors		6,095		
Labour gain from Residents		Swing		
Labour gain from Residents		Swing		

=== South ===
South (3)
Party	Candidate	Votes	%	±%
Labour	Joseph C. Taylor	1,206	55.5	−16.0
Labour	Edward Daly	1,191		N/A
Labour	Margaret E. Philpott	1,126		N/A
Conservative	Deryn J. Buckley	649	29.9	+14.5
Conservative	Frederick G. Turner	641		N/A
Conservative	Robert F. Williams	615		N/A
National Front	Brian W. Metz	200	9.2	−3.9
Residents	Donald Bird	119	5.5	N/A
Residents	David E. Reader	112		N/A
Residents	John E.J. Major	95		N/A
Turnout			29.5	+8.7
Registered electors		7,972		
Labour hold		Swing		
Labour hold		Swing		
Labour hold		Swing		

=== Stratford ===
Stratford (2)
Party	Candidate	Votes	%	±%
Labour	James C. Goldsmith	951	69.9	N/A
Labour	Raymond J. Lloyd	944		N/A
Conservative	Michael J. Bevis	271	19.9	N/A
Conservative	Anthony Crighton	266		N/A
National Front	Ronald Bock	102	7.5	N/A
Residents	Sheila D. Fisher	36	2.6	N/A
Residents	Elsa A. Fletcher	27		N/A
Turnout			24.9	N/A
Registered electors		5,830		
Labour hold		Swing		
Labour hold		Swing		

=== Upton ===
Upton (3)
Party	Candidate	Votes	%	±%
Labour	John R. Clow	1,856	73.1	+15.9
Labour	David A. Gilles	1,762		N/A
Labour	Liam A. Williams	1,761		N/A
Conservative	Brian S. Blanchard	683	26.9	+7.9
Conservative	Richard C. Strauss	662		N/A
Conservative	Hasmukh I. Patel	647		N/A
Turnout			30.6	+10.6
Registered electors		9,370		
Labour hold		Swing		
Labour hold		Swing		
Labour hold		Swing		

=== Wall End ===
Wall End (3)
Party	Candidate	Votes	%	±%
Labour	Herbert T. Philpott	1,526	48.6	−5.1
Labour	Timothy M. O'Connor	1,461		N/A
Labour	John Clark	1,395		N/A
Conservative	P. J. Sutton	890	14.8	+13.5
Conservative	Donald MacIver	802		N/A
Conservative	Angela M. Wotherspoon	723		N/A
Residents	Frederick Bates	484	15.4	−16.0
Residents	Joseph B. Gilchrist	476		N/A
Residents	Harry Storer	438		N/A
National Front	John Tucker	240	7.6	N/A
Turnout			36.4	+13.5
Registered electors		9,028		
Labour hold		Swing		
Labour hold		Swing		
Labour hold		Swing		

=== West Ham ===
West Ham (2)
Party	Candidate	Votes	%	±%
Labour	Alfred T. Dickerson	1,079	68.5	N/A
Labour	Peter J. Undrill	1,006		N/A
Conservative	Betty J. Hunt	255	16.2	N/A
Conservative	Louise C. Short	246		N/A
National Front	Carol A. Armond	187	11.9	N/A
National Front	Raymond Carne	176		N/A
Residents	Annie L. Lewis	55	3.5	N/A
Residents	Jacqueline Lawther	40		N/A
Turnout			24.9	N/A
Registered electors		6,775		
Labour hold		Swing		
Labour hold		Swing		

== By-elections between 1978 and 1982 ==
=== Central ===
Central by-election, 8 November 1979
Party	Candidate	Votes	%	±%
Labour	Christopher J. McLoughlin	872	48.7	−13.3
Liberal	David J. Corney	574	32.0	N/A
Conservative	Donald MacIver	162	9.0	N/A
Residents	Herbert H. Martin	155	8.7	−19.7
Socialist Current Organisation	Margaret R. Boukerou	28	1.6	N/A
Majority		298	16.7	N/A
Turnout			28.4	−7.5
Registered electors		6,349		
Labour hold		Swing		

The by-election was called following the death of Cllr. Henry E. L. Ronan.

=== South ===
South by-election, 8 November 1979
Party	Candidate	Votes	%	±%
Labour	Leonard D. Manley	792	58.6	+3.1
Residents	Francis C. Nicholson	233	17.2	+11.7
Conservative	Cedric A. Day	197	15.1	−14.8
Ind. Socialist	David T. Grainger	79	6.1	N/A
National Front	Carol A. Armond	50	3.8	−5.4
Majority		559	41.4	N/A
Turnout			17.6	−11.9
Registered electors		7,674		
Labour hold		Swing		

The by-election was called following the resignation of Cllr. Joseph C. Taylor.

=== Castle ===
Castle by-election, 27 March 1980
Party	Candidate	Votes	%	±%
Labour	John A. McAulay	956	57.7	+3.0
Residents	Alfred W. R. King	553	33.4	−11.9
Conservative	Peter J. Doe	147	8.9	N/A
Majority		403	24.3	N/A
Turnout			25.6	+0.4
Registered electors		6,501		
Labour hold		Swing		

The by-election was called following the resignation of Cllr. Herbert G. Simpson.

=== Central ===
Central by-election, 15 May 1980
Party	Candidate	Votes	%	±%
Labour	Alan Mattingly	1,050	50.8	−11.2
Liberal	David J. Corney	815	39.3	N/A
Residents	Francis C. Nicholson	123	5.9	−22.5
Conservative	Donald MacIver	83	4.0	N/A
Majority		235	11.5	N/A
Turnout			33.2	−2.7
Registered electors		6,247		
Labour hold		Swing		

The by-election was called following the death of Cllr. Sidney A. Elson.

=== Wall End ===
Wall End by-election, 15 May 1980
Party	Candidate	Votes	%	±%
Labour	Sarah J. Reeves	1,282	61.2	+12.6
Conservative	Damian P. J. Sutton	451	21.5	+6.7
Residents	Stanley Vine	209	10.0	−5.4
Liberal	Christopher M. Hill	153	7.3	N/A
Majority		831	39.7	N/A
Turnout			24.1	−5.4
Registered electors		8,722		
Labour hold		Swing		

The by-election was called following the resignation of Cllr. John Clark.
