= 1971 Newham London Borough Council election =

Elections to Newham London Borough Council were held in May 1971. The whole council was up for election. Turnout was 27.3%. This election had aldermen as well as councillors. Labour won all ten aldermen positions.

== Background ==
A total of 142 candidates stood in the election for the 60 seats being contested across 24 wards. 2 seats in one ward went unopposed. Candidates included a full slate from the Labour Party, while the Liberal and Conservative parties stood 8 and 21 respectively. Other candidates included 42 Residents & Ratepayers, 3 Communists and 2 National Front.

== Election result ==
Newham local election result 1971
Party	Seats	Gains	Losses	Net gain/loss	Seats %	Votes %	Votes	+/−
Labour	53	23	0	+23	88.33	66.0		
Conservative	0	0	6	-6	0.0	8.1		
Liberal	0	0	3	-3	0.0	2.7		
Other parties	7	0	14	-14	11.67	23.2		

== Results by ward ==
=== Beckton ===
Beckton (2)
Party	Candidate	Votes	%	±%
Labour	H.A. Taylor	1,014	74.2	+4.1
Labour	D.A. Whitbread	956		N/A
Residents	D.J. Johnson	247	18.1	N/A
Residents	S.R. Hart	225		N/A
Communist	R.A. Offley	106	7.8	−22.1
Turnout			32.8	+18.7
Registered electors		4,163		
Labour hold		Swing		
Labour hold		Swing		

=== Bemersyde ===
Bemersyde (2)
Party	Candidate	Votes	%	±%
Labour	F.H Ferrier	1,760	69.8	+17.1
Labour	H. Bauckham	1,736		N/A
Residents	C. H. Mears	762	30.2	−17.1
Residents	D. Miles	760		N/A
Turnout			39.8	+4.0
Registered electors		6,493		
Labour hold		Swing		
Labour hold		Swing		

=== Canning Town & Grange ===
Canning Town & Grange (2)
Party	Candidate	Votes	%	±%
Labour	C. L. Bock	1,242	79.1	N/A
Labour	D. W. Lee	1,198		N/A
Residents	M. R. Hammond	328	20.1	N/A
Residents	G. V. S. Nottage	280		N/A
Turnout			25.7	N/A
Registered electors		6,317		
Labour hold		Swing		
Labour hold		Swing		

=== Castle ===
Castle (2)
Party	Candidate	Votes	%	±%
Labour	C. Clements	1,022	50.1	+28.4
Residents	A. W. King	1,018	49.9	−18.8
Labour	F. J. Thompson	999		N/A
Residents	J. M. King	990		N/A
Turnout			33.4	−3.3
Registered electors		6,252		
Labour gain from Residents		Swing		
Labour hold		Swing		

=== Central ===
Central (2)
Party	Candidate	Votes	%	±%
Labour	E. P. Granger	1,005	56.5	+26.6
Labour	S. A. Elson	1,000		N/A
Residents	M. B. Layton	773	43.5	−3.4
Residents	A. Macfarlane	767		N/A
Turnout			29.3	−4.0
Registered electors		6,377		
Labour gain from Residents		Swing		
Labour gain from Residents		Swing		

=== Custom House & Silvertown ===
Custom House & Silvertown (3)
Party	Candidate	Votes	%	±%
Labour	W. Dunlop	1,624	85.2	+12.5
Labour	P. F. Newman	1,467		N/A
Labour	J. C. Stockbridge	1,420		N/A
Residents	E. D. M. Lonsdale	283	14.8	N/A
Residents	E. Frost	258		N/A
Residents	J. D. Smith	243		N/A
Turnout			22.5	+11.3
Registered electors		8,830		
Labour hold		Swing		
Labour hold		Swing		
Labour hold		Swing		

=== Forest Gate ===
Forest Gate (3)
Party	Candidate	Votes	%	±%
Labour	M. E. Helps	1,374	50.5	+16.2
Labour	S. Hopwood	1,255		N/A
Labour	J. J. Haggerty	1,213		N/A
Residents	L. Hall	1,075	33.3	N/A
Residents	R. F. C. Ower	905		N/A
Residents	R. D. Towner	878		N/A
Conservative	T. W. Orrin	440	16.2	−32.3
Conservative	R. E. Wotherspoon	401		N/A
Conservative	A. R. Lane	397		N/A
Turnout			31.5	+5.1
Registered electors		8,968		
Labour gain from Conservative		Swing		
Labour gain from Conservative		Swing		
Labour gain from Conservative		Swing		

=== Greatfield ===
Greatfield (3)
Party	Candidate	Votes	%	±%
Residents	M. J. Talbot	1,771	59.9	−16.6
Residents	F. G. Hammond	1,759		N/A
Residents	S. G. Ling	1,759		N/A
Labour	R. J. Fox	1,187	40.1	+16.6
Labour	C. Langley	1,160		N/A
Labour	M. M. Hasan	1,078		N/A
Turnout			32.9	−6.5
Registered electors		9,306		
Residents hold		Swing		
Residents hold		Swing		
Residents hold		Swing		

=== Hudsons ===
Hudsons (3)
Party	Candidate	Votes	%	±%
Labour	M. Davidson	2,072	83.9	+21.6
Labour	H. E. Fitzsimons	2,024		N/A
Labour	J. E. Griffin	1,976		N/A
Conservative	G. Eldridge	397	16.1	−21.6
Conservative	A. J. Retter	313		N/A
Conservative	E. Knight	303		N/A
Turnout			28.1	+11.7
Registered electors		9,112		
Labour hold		Swing		
Labour hold		Swing		
Labour hold		Swing		

=== Kensington ===
Kensington (2)
Party	Candidate	Votes	%	±%
Labour	H. W. Pike	921	45.9	+22.7
Residents	E. A. R. Lonsdale	917	45.7	−31.1
Labour	C. W. Jay	916		N/A
Residents	J. W. F. Hucker	860		N/A
National Democrat	S. A. C. Webb	167	8.3	N/A
Turnout			31.5	+0.4
Registered electors		6,330		
Labour gain from Residents		Swing		
Residents hold		Swing		

=== Little Ilford ===
Little Ilford (3)
Party	Candidate	Votes	%	±%
Labour	W. E. Hurford	1,253	57.5	+23.2
Labour	W. H. Brown	1,194		N/A
Labour	G. W. Phillips	1,143		N/A
Residents	A. E. Carr	733	33.6	−16.2
Residents	C Miranda	728		N/A
Residents	L. M. Mersh	694		N/A
Communist	T. E. Stone	127	5.8	+0.7
Civil and Human Rights	M. Flaherty	67	3.1	N/A
Turnout			25.0	+1.2
Registered electors		8,678		
Labour gain from Residents		Swing		
Labour gain from Residents		Swing		
Labour gain from Residents		Swing		

=== Manor Park ===
Manor Park (3)
Party	Candidate	Votes	%	±%
Labour	N. A. Chubb	1,658	63.1	+28.6
Labour	F. A. J. Bigland	1,637		N/A
Labour	J. G. Warren	1,593		N/A
Conservative	S. L. Norton	969	36.9	−28.6
Conservative	C. A. Rugg	929		N/A
Conservative	C. L. Retter	923		N/A
Turnout			28.0	+0.8
Registered electors		9,693		
Labour gain from Conservative		Swing		
Labour gain from Conservative		Swing		
Labour gain from Conservative		Swing		

=== New Town ===
New Town (2)
Party	Candidate	Votes	%	±%
Labour	F. J. Dowling	1,348	67.5	+14.5
Labour	L. A. Wood	1,300		N/A
Liberal	J. W. Francis	497	24.9	−22.1
Liberal	J. W. Giles	370		N/A
Residents	G. E. Mason	152	7.6	N/A
Residents	P. M. Parr	139		N/A
Turnout			32.6	+15.9
Registered electors		6,096		
Labour hold		Swing		
Labour gain from Liberal		Swing		

=== Ordnance ===
Ordnance (2)
Party	Candidate	Votes	%	±%
Labour	C. A. Flemwell	1,130	83.5	+20.7
Labour	A. R. Summers	1,091		N/A
Residents	M. J. Burns	224	16.5	N/A
Residents	K. J. Morgan	220		N/A
Turnout			26.0	+14.7
Registered electors		5,380		
Labour hold		Swing		
Labour hold		Swing		

=== Park ===
Park (3)
Party	Candidate	Votes	%	±%
Labour	A. Wolffe	1,688	80.6	+29.2
Labour	H. E. L. Ronan	1,627		N/A
Labour	S. H. Smith	1,615		N/A
Liberal	B. G. McCarthy	405	19.4	+3.8
Liberal	J. Wren	367		N/A
Liberal	J. H. Linehan	336		N/A
Turnout			23.4	+0.2
Registered electors		9,552		
Labour hold		Swing		
Labour hold		Swing		
Labour hold		Swing		

=== Plaistow ===
Plaistow (3)
Party	Candidate	Votes	%	±%
Labour	A. Bigg	1,830	68.3	+25.5
Labour	E. Billups	1,811		N/A
Labour	C. D. Watts	1,734		N/A
Residents	A. Elliot	850	31.7	−25.5
Residents	M. L. Finch	841		N/A
Residents	N. Torkington	742		N/A
Turnout			32.2	+16.1
Registered electors		8,684		
Labour gain from Residents		Swing		
Labour gain from Residents		Swing		
Labour hold		Swing		

=== Plashet ===
Plashet (3)
Party	Candidate	Votes	%	±%
Labour	J. C. Carter	2,277	85.8	+33.1
Labour	A. F. Wilson	2,243		N/A
Labour	C. D. Watts	1,734		N/A
Conservative	R. T. Hunt	377	14.2	−11.8
Conservative	R. K. Howlett	369		N/A
Conservative	M. L. Jordan	366		N/A
Turnout			29.2	+2.7
Registered electors		9,638		
Labour hold		Swing		
Labour hold		Swing		
Labour hold		Swing		

=== St Stephens ===
St Stephens (2)
Party	Candidate	Votes	%	±%
Labour	M. Brown	1,110	53.4	+23.6
Labour	T. Nolan	1,076		N/A
Residents	E. J. Hayden	967	46.6	−23.6
Residents	R. J. Smith	907		N/A
Turnout			33.3	+0.3
Registered electors		6,390		
Labour gain from Residents		Swing		
Labour gain from Residents		Swing		

=== South ===
South (3)
Party	Candidate	Votes	%	±%
Labour	T. Jenkinson	2,385	81.3	+29.5
Labour	E. Daly	2,301		N/A
Labour	J. C. Taylor	2,222		N/A
Conservative	D. L. Power	550	18.7	−10.3
Conservative	J. Power	489		N/A
Conservative	H. J. F. Prendergast	468		N/A
Turnout			29.7	+4.0
Registered electors		9,638		
Labour hold		Swing		
Labour hold		Swing		
Labour hold		Swing		

=== Stratford ===
Stratford (2)
Party	Candidate	Votes	%	±%
Labour	H. W. Doran	907	75.3	+22.2
Labour	E. G. Goodyer	879		N/A
Residents	J. V. Maddock	209	17.3	N/A
Residents	H. W. Hennem	202		N/A
Communist	T. C. Bowers	49	4.1	−5.5
National Front	B. W. Tildesley	40	3.3	−5.5
Turnout			24.2	+7.9
Registered electors		5,115		
Labour hold		Swing		
Labour hold		Swing		

=== Upton ===
Upton (3)
Party	Candidate	Votes	%	±%
Labour	K. Hasler	1,933	63.3	+30.2
Labour	E. S. C. Kebbell	1,905		N/A
Labour	L. A. Williams	1,856		N/A
Conservative	R. J. Blake	611	20.0	−10.7
Conservative	C. A. Knight	600		N/A
Conservative	P. J. Blake	569		N/A
Liberal	R. P. McCarthy	511	16.7	−19.5
Liberal	H. S. Butalia	495		N/A
Liberal	E. Wren	489		N/A
Turnout			33.2	+8.4
Registered electors		9,856		
Labour gain from Liberal		Swing		
Labour gain from Liberal		Swing		
Labour hold		Swing		

=== Wall End ===
Wall End (3)
Party	Candidate	Votes	%	±%
Labour	H. T. Philpott	1,533	50.6	+22.6
Labour	M. Philpott	1,483		N/A
Labour	J. Wilson	1,439		N/A
Residents	G. L. Bendall	1,118	36.9	−11.8
Residents	J. S. Bailey	1,093		N/A
Residents	M. Lay	1,088		N/A
Conservative	J. H. Brewster	380	12.5	−5.8
Conservative	R. D. V. Ray	354		N/A
Conservative	P. Roberts	324		N/A
Turnout			33.5	−4.6
Registered electors		9,237		
Labour gain from Residents		Swing		
Labour gain from Residents		Swing		
Labour gain from Residents		Swing		

=== West Ham ===
West Ham (2)
Party	Candidate	Votes	%	±%
Labour	T. H. Camp	960	79.1	+16.6
Labour	W. H. Sutton	906		N/A
Residents	S. V. Collins	170	14.0	N/A
Residents	A. L. Hudson	134		N/A
National Front	A. J. Hammond	83	6.8	N/A
Turnout			20.1	+8.2
Registered electors		6,189		
Labour hold		Swing		
Labour hold		Swing		

=== Woodgrange ===
Woodgrange (2)
Party	Candidate	Votes	%	±%
Residents	G. W. Brown	894	56.2	−14.2
Residents	J. P. Davis	873		N/A
Labour	D. Harris	697	43.8	+14.2
Labour	B. Patel	591		N/A
Turnout			26.3	+4.3
Registered electors		6,165		
Residents hold		Swing		
Residents hold		Swing		

== By-elections between 1971 and 1974 ==
=== Custom House & Silvertown ===
Custom House & Silvertown by-election, 23 November 1972
Party	Candidate	Votes	%	±%
Labour	W. A. Chapman	841	67.5	−17.7
Residents	R. F. C. Ower	200	16.0	+1.2
National Front	A. J. Hammond	181	14.5	N/A
Conservative	M. L. Jordan	25	2.0	N/A
Majority		641	41.5	N/A
Turnout			15.2	−7.3
Registered electors		8,178		
Labour hold		Swing		
