= 1964 Newham London Borough Council election =

The 1964 Newham London Borough Council election took place on 7 May 1964 to elect members of Newham London Borough Council in London, England. The whole council was up for election and the Labour Party gained control of the council.

== Background ==
These elections were the first to the newly formed borough. Previously elections had taken place in the County Borough of East Ham, County Borough of West Ham, Metropolitan Borough of Woolwich and Municipal Borough of Barking. These boroughs were joined to form the new London Borough of Newham by the London Government Act 1963.

A total of 145 candidates stood in the election for the 60 seats being contested across 24 wards. 3 seats in one ward went unopposed. These included a full slate from the Labour Party, while the Liberal and Conservative parties stood 38 and 20 respectively. Other candidates included 17 Residents, 7 Communists and 2 Independents. There were 12 three-seat wards and 12 two-seat wards.

This election had aldermen as well as directly elected councillors. Labour got all 10 aldermen.

The Council was elected in 1964 as a "shadow authority" but did not start operations until 1 April 1965.

== Election result ==
The results saw Labour gain the new council with a majority of 40 after winning 50 of the 60 seats. Overall turnout in the election was 29.4%. This turnout included 333 postal votes.

Newham local election result 1964
Party	Seats	Gains	Losses	Net gain/loss	Seats %	Votes %	Votes	+/−
Labour	50	50	0	+50	83.3	59.8		
Other parties	7	7	0	+7	11.7	18.5		
Liberal	3	3	0	+3	5.0	15.7		
Conservative	0	0	0	±0.0	0.0	6.0		

== Results by ward ==
=== Beckton ===
Beckton (2)
Party	Candidate	Votes	%	±%
Labour	W Pattinson	924	85.6	N/A
Labour	H Taylor	850		N/A
Communist	R Offley	80	7.4	N/A
Liberal	E Hayes	75	7.0	N/A
Turnout		1,059	20.1	N/A
Registered electors		5,275		
Labour win (new seat)				
Labour win (new seat)				

=== Bemersyde ===
Bemersyde (2)
Party	Candidate	Votes	%	±%
Labour	F Ferrier	1,469	69.3	N/A
Labour	H Bauckham	1,467		N/A
Liberal	R Savill	652	30.7	N/A
Liberal	E Gull	632		N/A
Turnout		2,158	35.7	N/A
Registered electors		6,044		
Labour win (new seat)				
Labour win (new seat)				

=== Canning Town & Grange ===
Canning Town & Grange (2)
Party	Candidate	Votes	%	±%
Labour	C Bock	1,011	72.4	N/A
Labour	D Sherman	993		N/A
Liberal	J Freeman	173	12.4	N/A
Independent	F Barratt	160	11.5	N/A
Liberal	L Hollick	138		N/A
Communist	E Barnes	53	3.8	N/A
Turnout		1,321	20.4	N/A
Registered electors		6,476		
Labour win (new seat)				
Labour win (new seat)				

=== Castle ===
Castle (2)
Party	Candidate	Votes	%	±%
Labour	W Johnson	1,186	50.6	N/A
Labour	A Smith	1,166		N/A
Residents	H Hennem	1,116	47.6	N/A
Residents	A Hall	1,099		N/A
Communist	F Farmer	41	1.8	N/A
Turnout		2,365	40.0	N/A
Registered electors		5,911		
Labour win (new seat)				
Labour win (new seat)				

=== Central ===
Central (2)
Party	Candidate	Votes	%	±%
Labour	J Hart	1,148	75.5	N/A
Labour	J Kent	1,088		N/A
Liberal	B Allen	372	24.5	N/A
Liberal	A Retter	338		N/A
Turnout		1,526	24.8	N/A
Registered electors		6,142		
Labour win (new seat)				
Labour win (new seat)				

=== Custom House & Silvertown ===
Custom House & Silvertown (3)
Party	Candidate	Votes	%	±%
Labour	W Dunlop	1,446	75.7	N/A
Labour	W Rees	1,339		N/A
Labour	P Newman	1,329		N/A
Liberal	Eugene Johnson	395	20.7	N/A
Liberal	D Burrows	335		N/A
Liberal	E Smith	252		N/A
Communist	J Walker	70	3.7	N/A
Turnout		1,868	22.0	N/A
Registered electors		8,492		
Labour win (new seat)				
Labour win (new seat)				
Labour win (new seat)				

=== Forest Gate ===
Forest Gate (3)
Party	Candidate	Votes	%	±%
Labour	T Camp	1,468	59.0	N/A
Labour	F White	1,437		N/A
Labour	J Sinclair	1,424		N/A
Liberal	H Brooke	559	22.4	N/A
Liberal	D Abramson	508		N/A
Liberal	M Reed	470		N/A
Conservative	P Sims	407	16.3	N/A
Conservative	E Knight	402		N/A
Conservative	T Orrin	385		N/A
Independent	D Hanlon	56	2.2	N/A
Turnout		2,449	25.8	N/A
Registered electors		9,493		
Labour win (new seat)				
Labour win (new seat)				
Labour win (new seat)				

=== Greatfield ===
Greatfield (3)
Party	Candidate	Votes	%	±%
Residents	F Hammond	2,262	49.1	N/A
Residents	M Talbot	2,071		N/A
Residents	S Ling	2,039		N/A
Labour	J Keeble	2,003	43.4	N/A
Labour	J Burns	1,897		N/A
Labour	J Taylor	1,806		N/A
Conservative	A Tathers	345	7.5	N/A
Conservative	J Murphy	274		N/A
Turnout		4,390	49.4	N/A
Registered electors		8,891		
Residents win (new seat)				
Residents win (new seat)				
Residents win (new seat)				

=== Hudsons ===
Hudsons (3)
Party	Candidate	Votes	%	±%
Labour	H Fitzsimons	1,730	83.3	N/A
Labour	W Cross	1,724		N/A
Labour	M Davidson	1,712		N/A
Liberal	L Burrows	347	16.7	N/A
Liberal	P Hayes	329		N/A
Liberal	M Flaherty	325		N/A
Turnout		2,175	24.5	N/A
Registered electors		8,872		
Labour win (new seat)				
Labour win (new seat)				
Labour win (new seat)				

=== Kensington ===
Kensington (2)
Party	Candidate	Votes	%	±%
Residents	E Lonsdale	1,330	53.6	N/A
Residents	H Ringrow	1,300		N/A
Labour	L Nicholas	959	38.7	N/A
Labour	R Swanton	957		N/A
Conservative	G Crocker	192	7.7	N/A
Conservative	P Whitehead	174		N/A
Turnout		2,494	45.0	N/A
Registered electors		5,548		
Residents win (new seat)				
Residents win (new seat)				

=== Little Ilford ===
Little Ilford (3)
Party	Candidate	Votes	%	±%
Labour	H Lugg	1,566	73.8	N/A
Labour	W Hurford	1,563		N/A
Labour	M Helps	1,541		N/A
Liberal	H Mason	394	18.6	N/A
Liberal	S Avis	387		N/A
Liberal	S Temple	353		N/A
Communist	L Brown	163	7.7	N/A
Turnout		2,106	23.4	N/A
Registered electors		9,099		
Labour win (new seat)				
Labour win (new seat)				
Labour win (new seat)				

=== Manor Park ===
Manor Park (3)
Party	Candidate	Votes	%	±%
Labour	R Beadle	1,497	45.2	N/A
Labour	W Batterham	1,406		N/A
Labour	F Fincham	1,365		N/A
Conservative	C Blackmore	1,011	30.5	N/A
Conservative	F Stevens	990		N/A
Conservative	W Shearman	899		N/A
Residents	P Bowden	806	24.3	N/A
Residents	R Elford	791		N/A
Residents	E Parker	750		N/A
Turnout		3,268	34.4	N/A
Registered electors		9,511		
Labour win (new seat)				
Labour win (new seat)				
Labour win (new seat)				

=== New Town ===
New Town (2)
Party	Candidate	Votes	%	±%
Labour	J Warren	1,055	83.0	N/A
Labour	S Whitear	1,046		N/A
Liberal	F Penfold	216	17.0	N/A
Liberal	J Clark	205		N/A
Turnout		1,304	21.2	N/A
Registered electors		6,140		
Labour win (new seat)				
Labour win (new seat)				

=== Ordnance ===
Ordnance (2)
Party	Candidate	Votes	%	±%
Labour	F Radley	996	79.1	N/A
Labour	A Gannon	950		N/A
Liberal	A Barr	263	20.9	N/A
Liberal	E McGrane	221		N/A
Turnout		1,297	23.0	N/A
Registered electors		5,635		
Labour win (new seat)				
Labour win (new seat)				

=== Park ===
Park (3)
Party	Candidate	Votes	%	±%
Labour	Wolffe	2,042	64.9	N/A
Labour	Hasler	2,039		N/A
Labour	H Ronan	2,037		N/A
Liberal	J Linehan	1,106	35.1	N/A
Liberal	N Phillips	1,083		N/A
Liberal	J Francis	999		N/A
Turnout		3,078	31.5	N/A
Registered electors		9,759		
Labour win (new seat)				
Labour win (new seat)				
Labour win (new seat)				

=== Plaistow ===
Plaistow (3)
Party	Candidate	Votes	%	±%
Labour	P O’Connell	1,303	83.5	N/A
Labour	A Bigg	1,287		N/A
Labour	K Webb	1,262		N/A
Liberal	J Towler	257	16.5	N/A
Turnout		1,573	18.4	N/A
Registered electors		8,563		
Labour win (new seat)				
Labour win (new seat)				
Labour win (new seat)				

=== Plashet ===
Plashet (3)
Party	Candidate	Votes	%	±%
Labour	E Kebbell	1,770	63.0	N/A
Labour	J Carter	1,744		N/A
Labour	W Watts	1,675		N/A
Liberal	J Giles	818	29.1	N/A
Liberal	D Wheeler	695		N/A
Liberal	P Scriven	694		N/A
Conservative	C Knight	223	7.9	N/A
Conservative	E Orrin	208		N/A
Conservative	F Strange	192		N/A
Turnout		2,744	29.6	N/A
Registered electors		9,255		
Labour win (new seat)				
Labour win (new seat)				
Labour win (new seat)				

=== St Stephens ===
St Stephens (2)
Party	Candidate	Votes	%	±%
Residents	G Nottage	1,163	49.0	N/A
Residents	L Cumming	1,142		N/A
Labour	W Brown	1,014	42.7	N/A
Labour	S Mail	983		N/A
Conservative	T Nolan	197	8.3	N/A
Conservative	C Rugg	195		N/A
Turnout		2,418	42.0	N/A
Registered electors		5,757		
Residents win (new seat)				
Residents win (new seat)				

=== South ===
South (3)
Party	Candidate	Votes	%	±%
Labour	H Fisher	0	N/A	N/A
Labour	T Jenkinson	0	N/A	N/A
Labour	W Knight	0	N/A	N/A
Turnout		0	N/A	N/A
Registered electors		9,321		
Labour win (new seat)				
Labour win (new seat)				
Labour win (new seat)				

=== Stratford ===
Stratford (2)
Party	Candidate	Votes	%	±%
Labour	E Goodyer	753	74.4	N/A
Labour	J Riley	739		N/A
Liberal	R McCarthy	259	25.6	N/A
Liberal	G Jennings	244		N/A
Turnout		1,054	18.6	N/A
Registered electors		5,667		
Labour win (new seat)				
Labour win (new seat)				

=== Upton ===
Upton (3)
Party	Candidate	Votes	%	±%
Liberal	D Brooke	1,635	47.9	N/A
Liberal	B McCarthy	1,476		N/A
Liberal	E Wren	1,450		N/A
Labour	D Smith	1,406	41.2	N/A
Labour	G Jacobs	1,396		N/A
Labour	S Smith	1,380		N/A
Conservative	C Balcomb	369	10.8	N/A
Conservative	S Plant	315		N/A
Conservative	W Orrin	301		N/A
Turnout		3,370	34.1	N/A
Registered electors		9,871		
Liberal win (new seat)				
Liberal win (new seat)				
Liberal win (new seat)				

=== Wall End ===
Wall End (3)
Party	Candidate	Votes	%	±%
Labour	E Devenay	1,852	58.3	N/A
Labour	L Griffiths	1,814		N/A
Labour	S Elson	1,736		N/A
Residents	W Mallendine	1,032	32.5	N/A
Residents	I Zimmer	1,026		N/A
Residents	A Allen	895		N/A
Communist	P Allen	292	9.2	N/A
Turnout		2,980	33.8	N/A
Registered electors		8,828		
Labour win (new seat)				
Labour win (new seat)				
Labour win (new seat)				

=== West Ham ===
West Ham (2)
Party	Candidate	Votes	%	±%
Labour	J Andrews	829	79.6	N/A
Labour	D Lee	799		N/A
Liberal	E Darsey	157	15.1	N/A
Liberal	S Wrightson	123		N/A
Communist	A Jones	55	5.3	N/A
Turnout		1,053	18.8	N/A
Registered electors		5,605		
Labour win (new seat)				
Labour win (new seat)				

=== Woodgrange ===
Woodgrange (2)
Party	Candidate	Votes	%	±%
Labour	R Ricketts	972	41.5	N/A
Labour	R Evans	922		N/A
Residents	D Owen	720	30.7	N/A
Residents	L Smith	642		N/A
Liberal	D Wheeler	325	13.9	N/A
Conservative	W Willis	325	13.9	N/A
Conservative	M Robinson	287		N/A
Liberal	W Krist	106		N/A
Turnout		2,107	36.3	N/A
Registered electors		5,805		
Labour win (new seat)				
Labour win (new seat)				

== By-elections between 1964 and 1968 ==
There were no by-elections.
