= 1982 Newham London Borough Council election =

1982 local election in England

The 1982 Newham London Borough Council election for the Newham London Borough Council was held on 6 May 1982. The whole council was up for election. Turnout was 27.0%. The Labour Party held onto its overwhelming majority.

== Election result ==
Newham local election result 1982
Party	Seats	Gains	Losses	Net gain/loss	Seats %	Votes %	Votes	+/−
Labour	54	0	3	-3	85.7	54.0		
Conservative	0	0	0	0	0.0	10.7		
Alliance	6	6	0	+6	9.5	29.1		
Other parties	3	0	3	0	4.8			

== Background ==
A total of 156 candidates stood in the election for the 60 seats being contested across 24 wards. Candidates included a full slate from the Labour Party, whilst the Conservative Party ran 29 candidates. The Liberal and SDP parties ran 56 joint candidates whilst the Liberal Party also ran 3 candidates under the Liberal Focus Team Alliance banner. Other candidates included 5 Independents, 1 Communist and 3 National Front.

== Results by ward ==
=== Beckton ===
Beckton (2)
Party	Candidate	Votes	%	±%
Labour	Herbert A. Taylor	875	73.2	−9.0
Labour	Derek A. Whitbread	783		N/A
Alliance	Robert G Fleming	321	26.8	N/A
Turnout			22.6	−6.0
Registered electors		5,519		
Labour hold		Swing		
Labour hold		Swing		

=== Bemersyde ===
Bemersyde (2)
Party	Candidate	Votes	%	±%
Labour	Harry Bauckham	733	56.9	−18.7
Labour	William Dunlop	634		N/A
Alliance	Adrian G. Cole	556	43.1	N/A
Alliance	Eileen M. McManus	517		N/A
Turnout			29.4	+2.8
Registered electors		4,792		
Labour hold		Swing		
Labour hold		Swing		

=== Canning Town & Grange ===
Canning Town & Grange (2)
Party	Candidate	Votes	%	±%
Labour	Jack A. Hart	1,178	67.5	−10.8
Labour	Charles Whincup	1,085		N/A
Alliance	Ronald S. Webb	567	32.5	N/A
Alliance	Margaret E. Linford	489		N/A
Turnout			30.9	+1.5
Registered electors		6,110		
Labour hold		Swing		
Labour hold		Swing		

=== Castle ===
Castle (2)
Party	Candidate	Votes	%	±%
Labour	Sarah L. M. Murray	1,031	62.4	+7.7
Labour	Robert A. Wales	965		N/A
Alliance	Leslie Hall	622	37.6	N/A
Alliance	David Gotobe	601		N/A
Turnout			30.7	+5.5
Registered electors		5,951		
Labour hold		Swing		
Labour hold		Swing		

=== Central ===
Central (2)
Party	Candidate	Votes	%	±%
Labour	Gordon T. George	1,050	54.0	−8.0
Labour	Stanley Hopwood	997		N/A
Alliance	David J. Corney	707	36.3	N/A
Alliance	Cathryn Y. Robbins	524		N/A
Independent	Leslie D. Jefferd	188	9.7	N/A
Turnout			36.7	+0.8
Registered electors		5,747		
Labour hold		Swing		
Labour hold		Swing		

=== Custom House & Silvertown ===
Custom House & Silvertown (3)
Party	Candidate	Votes	%	±%
Labour	William A. Chapman	1,026	61.8	−21.2
Labour	Julia C. I. Garfield	968		N/A
Labour	Thomas A. Jenkinson	861		N/A
Alliance	Aaron P. Chapman	634	38.2	N/A
Alliance	Sylvia A. Kilcoin	409		N/A
Alliance	Sally A. Smith	391		N/A
Turnout			23.7	+0.3
Registered electors		7,959		
Labour hold		Swing		
Labour hold		Swing		
Labour hold		Swing		

=== Forest Gate ===
Forest Gate (3)
Party	Candidate	Votes	%	±%
Labour	Michael T. Foley	992	40.0	−18.3
Labour	Ronald G. Augley	988		N/A
Labour	Conor M. McAuley	960		N/A
Alliance	Robert E. Burrows	811	32.7	N/A
Alliance	Leighton R. Andrews	782		N/A
Alliance	Alan J. Leaman	735		N/A
Conservative	Robin D. Atter	603	24.3	−13.7
Conservative	Victor E. Jackson	585		N/A
Conservative	Luigi Peluso	529		N/A
Communist	John G. Grahl	77	3.1	N/A
Turnout			28.7	+3.5
Registered electors		8,286		
Labour hold		Swing		
Labour hold		Swing		
Labour hold		Swing		

=== Greatfield ===
Greatfield (3)
Party	Candidate	Votes	%	±%
Alliance	Edwin G. Ray	1,501	59.0	N/A
Alliance	Neal A. Chubb	1,329		N/A
Alliance	John J. Haggerty	1,326		N/A
Labour	Marjorie E. Helps	1,043	41.0	+10.0
Labour	Anita J. Pollock	1,021		N/A
Labour	Thomas A. Acton	1,007		N/A
Turnout			32.7	−8.9
Registered electors		8,652		
Alliance gain from Residents		Swing		
Alliance gain from Residents		Swing		
Alliance gain from Residents		Swing		

=== Hudsons ===
Hudsons (3)
Party	Candidate	Votes	%	±%
Labour	Frederick C. Jones	1,009	61.0	−9.3
Labour	Frederick J. Dance	950		N/A
Labour	Richard W. Buxton	925		N/A
Alliance	Roy A. Adams	561	28.7	N/A
Alliance	Lorraine Brand	469		N/A
Alliance	Lamont M. Royer	460		N/A
Conservative	Thomas A. Ham	382	19.6	−0.5
Conservative	Jane F. Green	346		N/A
Conservative	Doris C. Neville	326		N/A
Turnout			26.7	+0.1
Registered electors		7,828		
Labour hold		Swing		
Labour hold		Swing		
Labour hold		Swing		

=== Kensington ===
Kensington (2)
Party	Candidate	Votes	%	±%
Labour	Kenneth C. R. Massey	1,412	59.4	+4.6
Labour	John J. Plant	1,257		N/A
Alliance	Sylvia E. Neal	540	22.7	N/A
Alliance	Henry R. Wheatcroft	515		N/A
Independent	Anand K. Sharma	424	17.8	N/A
Independent	Leon Netto	344	9.7	N/A
Turnout			41.8	−2.3
Registered electors		5,874		
Labour hold		Swing		
Labour hold		Swing		

=== Little Ilford ===
Little Ilford (3)
Party	Candidate	Votes	%	±%
Liberal	Paul J. Robbins	1,304	54.0	N/A
Liberal	Ann C. Winfield	1,202		N/A
Liberal	Rif Winfield	1,135		N/A
Labour	William H. Brown	1,030	42.7	−24.0
Labour	John A. Kemp	1,021		N/A
Labour	Patel G. Maganbhai	931		N/A
Workers Revolutionary	Andrew K. Blunden	79	3.3	−1.5
Turnout			32.2	+13.1
Registered electors		8,585		
Liberal gain from Labour		Swing		
Liberal gain from Labour		Swing		
Liberal gain from Labour		Swing		

=== Manor Park ===
Manor Park (3)
Party	Candidate	Votes	%	±%
Labour	Amarjit Singh	1,372	49.6	−3.5
Labour	James A. Parnell	1,291		N/A
Labour	Elizabeth C. Fullick	1,255		N/A
Conservative	Alexander G. Hope-Thomson	791	28.6	−10.4
Conservative	Andrew F. Winter	782		N/A
Conservative	Stanley L. Norton	754		N/A
Alliance	John S. Ashworth	604	21.8	N/A
Alliance	William A. Robinson	569		N/A
Alliance	Noble Din	500		N/A
Turnout			36.3	−1.5
Registered electors		8,571		
Labour hold		Swing		
Labour hold		Swing		
Labour hold		Swing		

=== Monega ===
Monega (2)
Party	Candidate	Votes	%	±%
Labour	Lewis E. Boyce	1,106	58.0	+2.4
Labour	Frederick E. York	1,027		N/A
Alliance	Alec J. Kellaway	479	25.1	N/A
Alliance	Harbans S. Jabbal	389		N/A
Independent	Kartor Singh	322	16.9	N/A
Independent	Munawar Hussain	295		N/A
Turnout			35.3	−1.1
Registered electors		5,834		
Labour hold		Swing		
Labour hold		Swing		

=== New Town ===
New Town (2)
Party	Candidate	Votes	%	±%
Labour	Peter J. Pendle	576	48.6	−19.2
Labour	Maurice Sampson	492		N/A
Alliance	Andrew J. Bolton	345	29.1	N/A
Alliance	David C. Powell	321		N/A
Conservative	Deryn J. Buckley	264	22.3	−6.7
Conservative	Barry W. Roberts	216		N/A
Turnout			28.5	+0.5
Registered electors		4,593		
Labour hold		Swing		
Labour hold		Swing		

=== Ordnance ===
Ordnance (2)
Party	Candidate	Votes	%	±%
Labour	Charles A. Flemwell	610	71.8	−13.0
Labour	Anne King	531		N/A
Alliance	Edward G. Powell	240	28.2	N/A
Alliance	Melva Campbell	197		N/A
Turnout			21.1	−1.6
Registered electors		4,266		
Labour hold		Swing		
Labour hold		Swing		

=== Park ===
Park (3)
Party	Candidate	Votes	%	±%
Labour	Ann Howlett	1,053	50.3	−15.1
Labour	James G. Newstead	960		N/A
Labour	Sidney H. Smith	937		N/A
Alliance	Leonard Ryder	598	28.6	N/A
Alliance	Leslie E. Groombridge	593		N/A
Alliance	Michael J. Hogan	579		N/A
Conservative	Roger M. Barker-Green	441	21.1	N/A
Conservative	Wendy N. Blanchard	420		N/A
Conservative	Richard C. Strauss	402		N/A
Turnout			30.8	+5.4
Registered electors		7,813		
Labour hold		Swing		
Labour hold		Swing		
Labour hold		Swing		

=== Plaistow ===
Plaistow (3)
Party	Candidate	Votes	%	±%
Labour	Anand N. Patil	1,906	74.8	+13.6
Labour	David J. Brand	1,235		N/A
Labour	Arthur F. G. Edwards	1,229		N/A
Alliance	Ian W. F. MacFadyen	468	18.4	N/A
Alliance	Nicholas Ward	461		N/A
Alliance	Amrik S. Mahandru	382		N/A
National Front	Michael B. Hipperson	175	6.9	N/A
National Front	Denis G. Holland	174		N/A
National Front	William J. Roberts	155		N/A
Turnout			29.7	+2.2
Registered electors		7,154		
Labour hold		Swing		
Labour hold		Swing		
Labour hold		Swing		

=== Plashet ===
Plashet (3)
Party	Candidate	Votes	%	±%
Labour	Frank I. Jackman	1,327	40.1	−35.1
Labour	Edwin Mann	1,216		N/A
Labour	Kenneth Palmer	1,167		N/A
Ind. Labour Party	Bill Watts	1,005	30.4	N/A
Ind. Labour Party	Peter Billups	962		N/A
Ind. Labour Party	Liam A. Williams	830		N/A
Alliance	Sailesh Bhattacharji	566	17.1	N/A
Alliance	Peshawari Bhalla	556		N/A
Conservative	Peter G. Ham	411	12.4	−12.4
Conservative	William G. Flynn	410		N/A
Conservative	Gerard Eldridge	401		N/A
Alliance	Ross B. Smith	396		N/A
Turnout			37.9	+5.9
Registered electors		8,845		
Labour hold		Swing		
Labour hold		Swing		
Labour hold		Swing		

=== St Stephens ===
St Stephens (2)
Party	Candidate	Votes	%	±%
Labour	Thomas Nolan	1,130	62.1	+4.2
Labour	Eric R. Harris	1,030		N/A
Alliance	Francis J. Rowden	406	22.3	N/A
Alliance	Ahmed E. Oomerjee	352		N/A
Independent	Bahadur S. Gahir	284	15.6	N/A
Independent	Parkash C. Sondhi	243		N/A
Turnout			40.4	−5.5
Registered electors		5,521		
Labour hold		Swing		
Labour hold		Swing		

=== South ===
South (3)
Party	Candidate	Votes	%	±%
Labour	Edward Daly	1,033	50.1	−5.4
Labour	Leonard D. Manley	886		N/A
Labour	Margaret E. Philpott	851		N/A
Conservative	Robert F. Williams	577	28.0	−1.9
Conservative	Sylvia L. Williams	455		N/A
Alliance	Anthony Wilkinson	451	21.9	N/A
Alliance	Frances L. Bolton	361		N/A
Alliance	David M. Coleman	361		N/A
Turnout			28.9	−0.6
Registered electors		7,278		
Labour hold		Swing		
Labour hold		Swing		
Labour hold		Swing		

=== Stratford ===
Stratford (2)
Party	Candidate	Votes	%	±%
Labour	James C. Goldsmith	665	57.2	−12.7
Labour	James C. Riley	563		N/A
Alliance	Albert Fuller	284	24.4	N/A
Alliance	Denis P. Groutage	230		N/A
Conservative	Florence Jackson	213	18.3	−1.6
Conservative	Emily J. Short	178		N/A
Turnout			23.6	−1.3
Registered electors		5,472		
Labour hold		Swing		
Labour hold		Swing		

=== Upton ===
Upton (3)
Party	Candidate	Votes	%	±%
Labour	John R. Clow	1,685	58.6	−14.5
Labour	David A. Gilles	1,447		N/A
Labour	Alan Mattingly	1,319		N/A
Independent	Noorallah Darwesh	440	15.3	N/A
Alliance	Belboda J. B. Cooke	435	15.1	N/A
Independent	Ahmed Din	403		N/A
Alliance	Surinder M. Gautama	389		N/A
Conservative	Edmund McCullagh	317	11.0	−15.9
Conservative	Dorothy M. Neal	311		N/A
Conservative	David Knight	304		N/A
Turnout			34.6	+4.0
Registered electors		8,380		
Labour hold		Swing		
Labour hold		Swing		
Labour hold		Swing		

=== Wall End ===
Wall End (3)
Party	Candidate	Votes	%	±%
Labour	Herbert T. Philpott	1,252	47.3	−1.3
Labour	Hermaish K. Dhesi	1,189		N/A
Labour	Sarah J. Reeves	1,162		N/A
Conservative	Donald MacIver	780	29.5	+14.7
Conservative	Gwendoline H. MacIver	749		N/A
Conservative	Laurence A. Howell	747		N/A
Alliance	Peggy R. Campbell	616	23.3	N/A
Alliance	Richard J. Minchin	537		N/A
Alliance	Ernest G. Mtunzi	514		N/A
Turnout			34.6	−1.8
Registered electors		8,534		
Labour hold		Swing		
Labour hold		Swing		
Labour hold		Swing		

=== West Ham ===
West Ham (2)
Party	Candidate	Votes	%	±%
Labour	Alfred T. Dickerson	865	54.4	−14.1
Labour	Peter J. Undrill	699		N/A
Alliance	Victor Schofield	380	23.9	N/A
Conservative	Dennis F. Privett	346	21.7	+5.5
Alliance	Simon McGrath	345		N/A
Conservative	Simon N. C. Pearce	319		N/A
Turnout			28.2	+3.3
Registered electors		6,194		
Labour hold		Swing		
Labour hold		Swing		

== By-elections between 1982 and 1986 ==
=== Forest Gate ===
Forest Gate by-election, 14 June 1984
Party	Candidate	Votes	%	±%
Labour	Margaret P. Olley	1,517	63.4	+23.4
Liberal	David C. Powell	469	19.6	−13.1
Conservative	Robin D. Atter	407	17.0	−7.3
Majority		1,048	43.8	N/A
Turnout			30.7	+2.0
Registered electors		7,845		
Labour hold		Swing		

The by-election was called following the resignation of Cllr. Michael T. Foley.

=== Little Ilford ===
Little Ilford by-election, 14 June 1984
Party	Candidate	Votes	%	±%
Liberal	Ann C. Winfield	1,868		
Labour	Stephen C. Timms	1,780		
Labour	Colin M. Copus	1,763		
Liberal	Rif Winfield	1,715		
Majority		88		N/A
Turnout			45.3	+13.1
Registered electors		8,431		
Liberal hold		Swing		
Labour gain from Lib Dem Focus Team		Swing		

The by-election was called following the resignations of Cllr. Rif Winfield and Cllr. Ann Winfield.

=== New Town ===
New Town by-election, 28 June 1984
Party	Candidate	Votes	%	±%
Labour	Wendy Mallard	987	71.7	+23.1
Alliance	Lee Reeves	264	19.2	−9.9
Conservative	Victor E. Jackson	125	9.1	−13.2
Majority		723	52.5	N/A
Turnout			28.4	−0.1
Registered electors		4,845		
Labour hold		Swing		

The by-election was called following the resignation of Cllr. Maurice Sampson.
