= 1974 Newham London Borough Council election =

Election in the Newham Borough Council in 1974

The 1974 Newham London Borough Council election was held on 2 May 1974. The entire Newham London Borough Council was up for election. Turnout was 19.9%. Four of the wards had incumbents that were re-elected unopposed.

== Election result ==
Newham local election result 1974
| Party | Seats | Gains | Losses | Net gain/loss | Seats % | Votes % | Votes | +/− |
|---|---|---|---|---|---|---|---|---|
| Labour | 51 | 2 | 4 | -2 | | 63.5 | | |
| Conservative | 0 | 0 | 0 | 0 | | 9.3 | | |
| Liberal | 0 | 0 | 0 | 0 | | 4.4 | | |
| Other parties | 9 | 4 | 2 | +2 | | 22.8 | | |

== Background ==
A total of 133 candidates stood in the election for the 60 seats being contested across 24 wards. 9 seats in four wards were elected unopposed. Candidates included a full slate from the Labour Party, while the Liberal and Conservative parties stood 16 and 21 respectively. Other candidates included 22 Residents & Ratepayers, 5 Communists and 6 National Front.

== Results by ward ==
=== Beckton ===
Beckton (2)
| Party | Candidate | Votes | % | ±% |
|---|---|---|---|---|
| Labour | H. A. Taylor | 826 | 91.2 | +17.0 |
| Labour | D. A. Whitbread | 809 | | N/A |
| Communist | R. A. Offley | 80 | 8.8 | +1.0 |
| Turnout | | | 19.4 | −13.2 |
| Registered electors | | 5,037 | | |
| Labour hold | | Swing | | |
| Labour hold | | Swing | | |

=== Bemersyde ===
Bemersyde (2)
| Party | Candidate | Votes | % | ±% |
|---|---|---|---|---|
| Labour | H. Bauckham | 1,164 | 70.9 | +1.1 |
| Labour | F. H. Ferrier | 1,164 | | N/A |
| Liberal | D. L. Perry | 257 | 15.7 | N/A |
| Liberal | E. Hollywood | 256 | | N/A |
| National Front | P. Alldis | 220 | 13.4 | N/A |
| Turnout | | | 25.8 | −14.0 |
| Registered electors | | 6,236 | | |
| Labour hold | | Swing | | |
| Labour hold | | Swing | | |

=== Canning Town & Grange ===
Canning Town & Grange (2)
| Party | Candidate | Votes | % | ±% |
|---|---|---|---|---|
| Labour | C. L. Bock | 623 | 75.4 | −3.7 |
| Labour | D. W. Lee | 598 | | N/A |
| National Front | W. H. Hill | 203 | 24.6 | N/A |
| Turnout | | | 16.6 | −9.1 |
| Registered electors | | 5,254 | | |
| Labour hold | | Swing | | |
| Labour hold | | Swing | | |

=== Castle ===
Castle (2)
| Party | Candidate | Votes | % | ±% |
|---|---|---|---|---|
| Residents | A. W. King | 813 | 59.4 | +9.5 |
| Residents | J. D. Smith | 637 | | N/A |
| Labour | C. J. Palme | 555 | 40.6 | −9.5 |
| Labour | A. J. Whincup | 552 | | N/A |
| Turnout | | | 25.2 | −8.2 |
| Registered electors | | 6,122 | | |
| Residents gain from Labour | | Swing | | |
| Residents hold | | Swing | | |

=== Central ===
Central (2)
| Party | Candidate | Votes | % | ±% |
|---|---|---|---|---|
| Labour | S. A. Elson | 743 | 56.4 | −0.1 |
| Labour | L. E. Higgs | 693 | | N/A |
| Residents | R. J. Hurlock | 503 | 40.6 | −2.9 |
| Residents | J. E. Major | 465 | | N/A |
| Liberal | K. W. Carter | 72 | 5.5 | N/A |
| Liberal | B. L. Porter | 65 | | N/A |
| Turnout | | | 23.0 | −6.3 |
| Registered electors | | 6,024 | | |
| Labour hold | | Swing | | |
| Labour hold | | Swing | | |

=== Custom House & Silvertown ===
Custom House & Silvertown (3)
| Party | Candidate | Votes | % | ±% |
|---|---|---|---|---|
| Labour | W. A. Chapman | 1,024 | 73.8 | −11.4 |
| Labour | J. C. Stockbridge | 983 | | N/A |
| Labour | P. J. Stanyer | 891 | | N/A |
| National Front | A. J. Hammond | 217 | 15.6 | N/A |
| Communist | A. A. Proctor | 146 | 10.5 | N/A |
| Communist | E. G. Smith | 117 | | N/A |
| Turnout | | | 18.6 | −3.9 |
| Registered electors | | 7,640 | | |
| Labour hold | | Swing | | |
| Labour hold | | Swing | | |
| Labour hold | | Swing | | |

=== Forest Gate ===
Forest Gate (3)
| Party | Candidate | Votes | % | ±% |
|---|---|---|---|---|
| Labour | J. J. Haggerty | 1,075 | 60.1 | +9.6 |
| Labour | M. E. Helps | 1,063 | | N/A |
| Labour | S. Hopwood | 1,002 | | N/A |
| Conservative | D. A. A. Amess | 425 | 23.8 | +7.6 |
| Conservative | T. W. Orrin | 404 | | N/A |
| Conservative | L. Peluso | 381 | | N/A |
| Liberal | A. Hetherington | 288 | 16.1 | N/A |
| Liberal | V. E. Hetherington | 236 | | N/A |
| Liberal | J. H. Linehan | 230 | | N/A |
| Turnout | | | 22.6 | −8.9 |
| Registered electors | | 8,203 | | |
| Labour hold | | Swing | | |
| Labour hold | | Swing | | |
| Labour hold | | Swing | | |

=== Greatfield ===
Greatfield (3)
| Party | Candidate | Votes | % | ±% |
|---|---|---|---|---|
| Residents | F. G. Hammond | 1,524 | 56.2 | −3.7 |
| Residents | H. Castle | 1,481 | | N/A |
| Residents | L. Hall | 1,420 | | N/A |
| Labour | A. J. Beverley | 904 | 33.3 | −7.8 |
| Labour | J. F. Byrne | 871 | | N/A |
| Labour | J. Clements | 862 | | N/A |
| Conservative | C. L. Beach | 286 | 10.5 | N/A |
| Conservative | J. T. Smith | 278 | | N/A |
| Conservative | D. P. J. Sutton | 264 | | N/A |
| Turnout | | | 31.1 | −1.8 |
| Registered electors | | 9,127 | | |
| Residents hold | | Swing | | |
| Residents hold | | Swing | | |
| Residents hold | | Swing | | |

=== Hudsons ===
Hudsons (3)
| Party | Candidate | Votes | % | ±% |
|---|---|---|---|---|
| Labour | F. J. Dance | 1,121 | 71.9 | −12.0 |
| Labour | H. E. Fitzsimons | 1,070 | | N/A |
| Labour | W. P. Foley | 1,068 | | N/A |
| National Front | R. A. Flower | 439 | 28.1 | N/A |
| Turnout | | | 30.4 | +2.3 |
| Registered electors | | 8,594 | | |
| Labour hold | | Swing | | |
| Labour hold | | Swing | | |
| Labour hold | | Swing | | |

=== Kensington ===
Kensington (2)
| Party | Candidate | Votes | % | ±% |
|---|---|---|---|---|
| Residents | E. A. R. Lonsdale | 989 | 53.5 | +7.8 |
| Residents | D. A. Williams | 939 | | N/A |
| Labour | H. W. Pike | 861 | 46.5 | +0.6 |
| Labour | H. E. L. Ronan | 810 | | N/A |
| Turnout | | | 30.4 | −1.1 |
| Registered electors | | 6,300 | | |
| Residents gain from Labour | | Swing | | |
| Residents hold | | Swing | | |

=== Little Ilford ===
Little Ilford (3)
| Party | Candidate | Votes | % | ±% |
|---|---|---|---|---|
| Labour | W. E. Hurford | 900 | 61.2 | +3.7 |
| Labour | W. H. Brown | 886 | | N/A |
| Labour | G. W. Phillips | 793 | | N/A |
| Residents | T. Moran | 396 | 26.9 | +6.7 |
| Residents | E. D. M. Lonsdale | 387 | | N/A |
| Residents | N. J. Biggadike | 349 | | N/A |
| Liberal | L. A. Edwards | 175 | 11.9 | N/A |
| Liberal | M. C. Fuller | 159 | | N/A |
| Liberal | A. J. H. Fulton | 148 | | N/A |
| Turnout | | | 19.1 | −5.9 |
| Registered electors | | 8,292 | | |
| Labour hold | | Swing | | |
| Labour hold | | Swing | | |
| Labour hold | | Swing | | |

=== Manor Park ===
Manor Park (3)
| Party | Candidate | Votes | % | ±% |
|---|---|---|---|---|
| Labour | N. A. Chubb | 1,192 | 57.4 | +5.7 |
| Labour | M. Schofield | 1,154 | | N/A |
| Labour | F. A. J. Bigland | 1,151 | | N/A |
| Conservative | C. A. Rugg | 616 | 29.7 | −7.2 |
| Conservative | R. E. Wotherspoon | 598 | | N/A |
| Conservative | T. A. L. Ham | 579 | | N/A |
| Liberal | P. R. Campbell | 268 | 12.9 | N/A |
| Liberal | L. H. Cohen | 232 | | N/A |
| Liberal | J. L. Davies | 193 | | N/A |
| Turnout | | | 23.8 | −4.2 |
| Registered electors | | 9,423 | | |
| Labour hold | | Swing | | |
| Labour hold | | Swing | | |
| Labour hold | | Swing | | |

=== New Town ===
New Town (2)
| Party | Candidate | Votes | % | ±% |
|---|---|---|---|---|
| Labour | J. G. Warren | 0 | N/A | N/A |
| Labour | L. A. Wood | 0 | N/A | N/A |
| Turnout | | 0 | N/A | N/A |
| Registered electors | | 5,558 | | |
| Labour hold | | Swing | | |
| Labour hold | | Swing | | |

=== Ordnance ===
Ordnance (2)
| Party | Candidate | Votes | % | ±% |
|---|---|---|---|---|
| Labour | D. J. Brand | 741 | 75.7 | −7.8 |
| Labour | C. A. Flemwell | 617 | | N/A |
| National Front | J. M. Barnard | 150 | 15.3 | N/A |
| Communist | T. F. Church | 88 | 9.0 | N/A |
| Turnout | | | 23.8 | −2.2 |
| Registered electors | | 5,625 | | |
| Labour hold | | Swing | | |
| Labour hold | | Swing | | |

=== Park ===
Park (3)
| Party | Candidate | Votes | % | ±% |
|---|---|---|---|---|
| Labour | F. Dowling | 0 | N/A | N/A |
| Labour | S. H. Smith | 0 | N/A | N/A |
| Labour | A. Wolffe | 0 | N/A | N/A |
| Turnout | | 0 | N/A | N/A |
| Registered electors | | 10,371 | | |
| Labour hold | | Swing | | |
| Labour hold | | Swing | | |
| Labour hold | | Swing | | |

=== Plaistow ===
Plaistow (3)
| Party | Candidate | Votes | % | ±% |
|---|---|---|---|---|
| Labour | L.G. Fox | 1,331 | 64.8 | −3.5 |
| Labour | E. Billups | 1,258 | | N/A |
| Labour | C. D. Watts | 1,177 | | N/A |
| Residents | M. L. Finch | 723 | 35.2 | +3.5 |
| Residents | E. I. Torkington | 587 | | N/A |
| Residents | N. Torkington | 546 | | N/A |
| Turnout | | | 22.8 | −9.4 |
| Registered electors | | 9,033 | | |
| Labour hold | | Swing | | |
| Labour hold | | Swing | | |
| Labour hold | | Swing | | |

=== Plashet ===
Plashet (3)
| Party | Candidate | Votes | % | ±% |
|---|---|---|---|---|
| Labour | A. F. Wilson | 1,560 | 85.7 | −0.1 |
| Labour | C. D. Watts | 1,523 | | N/A |
| Labour | J. G. Newstead | 1,473 | | N/A |
| Conservative | B. J. Hunt | 260 | 14.3 | +0.1 |
| Conservative | L. A. Howell | 251 | | N/A |
| Conservative | R. T. Hunt | 250 | | N/A |
| Turnout | | | 22.2 | −7.0 |
| Registered electors | | 8,919 | | |
| Labour hold | | Swing | | |
| Labour hold | | Swing | | |
| Labour hold | | Swing | | |

=== St Stephens ===
St Stephens (2)
| Party | Candidate | Votes | % | ±% |
|---|---|---|---|---|
| Residents | S. V. King | 838 | 51.7 | +5.1 |
| Residents | R. J. Smith | 793 | | N/A |
| Labour | T. Nolan | 782 | 48.3 | −5.1 |
| Labour | K. R. Mansell | 744 | | N/A |
| Turnout | | | 29.3 | −4.0 |
| Registered electors | | 5,954 | | |
| Residents gain from Labour | | Swing | | |
| Residents gain from Labour | | Swing | | |

=== South ===
South (3)
| Party | Candidate | Votes | % | ±% |
|---|---|---|---|---|
| Labour | E. Daly | 1,510 | 71.5 | −9.8 |
| Labour | T. Jenkinson | 1,425 | | N/A |
| Labour | J. C. Taylor | 1,366 | | N/A |
| Conservative | P. McLean | 325 | 15.4 | −3.3 |
| Conservative | R. F. Williams | 307 | | N/A |
| Conservative | J. H. Brewster | 277 | | N/A |
| National Front | A. G. Havard | 277 | 13.1 | N/A |
| Turnout | | | 20.8 | −8.9 |
| Registered electors | | 10,042 | | |
| Labour hold | | Swing | | |
| Labour hold | | Swing | | |
| Labour hold | | Swing | | |

=== Stratford ===
Stratford (2)
| Party | Candidate | Votes | % | ±% |
|---|---|---|---|---|
| Labour | H. W. Doran | 0 | N/A | N/A |
| Labour | A. S. Dowley | 0 | N/A | N/A |
| Turnout | | 0 | N/A | N/A |
| Registered electors | | 4,811 | | |
| Labour hold | | Swing | | |
| Labour hold | | Swing | | |

=== Upton ===
Upton (3)
| Party | Candidate | Votes | % | ±% |
|---|---|---|---|---|
| Labour | E. S. C. Kebbell | 1,186 | 57.2 | −6.1 |
| Labour | K. Hasler | 1,165 | | N/A |
| Labour | L. A. Williams | 1,128 | | N/A |
| Conservative | G. Eldridge | 394 | 19.0 | −1.0 |
| Liberal | F. P. Penfold | 358 | 17.3 | +0.6 |
| Conservative | S. J. Bradford | 356 | | N/A |
| Conservative | D. H. Brewster | 350 | | N/A |
| Liberal | E. L. Andrews | 306 | | N/A |
| Liberal | I. Towndrow | 291 | | N/A |
| Communist | C. O. L. Derick | 73 | 3.5 | N/A |
| Socialist Current Organisation | M. R. Boukerou | 62 | 3.0 | N/A |
| Socialist Current Organisation | L. Welsh | 52 | | N/A |
| Socialist Current Organisation | R. Rowe | 42 | | N/A |
| Turnout | | | 19.7 | −13.5 |
| Registered electors | | 10,603 | | |
| Labour hold | | Swing | | |
| Labour hold | | Swing | | |
| Labour hold | | Swing | | |

=== Wall End ===
Wall End (3)
| Party | Candidate | Votes | % | ±% |
|---|---|---|---|---|
| Labour | H. T. Philpott | 1,033 | 53.7 | +3.1 |
| Labour | J. Wilson | 994 | | N/A |
| Labour | M. E. Philpott | 970 | | N/A |
| Residents | B. A. Lineker | 604 | 31.4 | −5.5 |
| Residents | F. J. Brown | 586 | | N/A |
| Residents | P. M. Parr | 555 | | N/A |
| Conservative | E. S. Freeman | 285 | 14.8 | +2.3 |
| Conservative | S. Hunt | 278 | | N/A |
| Conservative | G. A. K. Rees | 256 | | N/A |
| Turnout | | | 22.9 | −10.6 |
| Registered electors | | 8,892 | | |
| Labour hold | | Swing | | |
| Labour hold | | Swing | | |
| Labour hold | | Swing | | |

=== West Ham ===
West Ham (2)
| Party | Candidate | Votes | % | ±% |
|---|---|---|---|---|
| Labour | D. Clarke | 0 | N/A | N/A |
| Labour | C. Cole | 0 | N/A | N/A |
| Turnout | | 0 | N/A | N/A |
| Registered electors | | 4,842 | | |
| Labour hold | | Swing | | |
| Labour hold | | Swing | | |

=== Woodgrange ===
Woodgrange (2)
| Party | Candidate | Votes | % | ±% |
|---|---|---|---|---|
| Labour | M. G. Pemberton | 608 | 58.3 | +14.5 |
| Labour | F. E. York | 873 | | N/A |
| Residents | J. P. Davis | 435 | 41.7 | −14.5 |
| Residents | E. G. Walker | 419 | | N/A |
| Turnout | | | 19.9 | −6.4 |
| Registered electors | | 5,543 | | |
| Labour gain from Residents | | Swing | | |
| Labour gain from Residents | | Swing | | |

== By-elections between 1974 and 1978 ==
=== Manor Park ===
Manor Park by-election, 9 October 1975
| Party | Candidate | Votes | % | ±% |
|---|---|---|---|---|
| Labour | Christopher J. Palme | 799 | 35.5 | −21.9 |
| Residents | James W.F. Hucker | 758 | 33.7 | N/A |
| Conservative | Cyril A. Rugg | 574 | 25.5 | −4.2 |
| Liberal | Lionel H. Cohen | 120 | 5.3 | −7.6 |
| Majority | | 41 | 1.8 | N/A |
| Turnout | | | 24.0 | −13.8 |
| Registered electors | | 9,393 | | |
| Labour hold | | Swing | | |

=== Canning Town & Grange ===
Canning Town & Grange by-election, 14 July 1977
| Party | Candidate | Votes | % | ±% |
|---|---|---|---|---|
| Labour | Jack A. Hart | 787 | 57.1 | −18.3 |
| National Front | John J. Johnston | 260 | 18.9 | −5.7 |
| Conservative | Robert F. Williams | 160 | 11.6 | N/A |
| Liberal | Anthony Hetherington | 115 | 8.3 | N/A |
| Residents | Michael L. Finch | 40 | 2.9 | N/A |
| Labour | John Clements | 17 | 1.2 | N/A |
| Majority | | 527 | 38.2 | N/A |
| Turnout | | | 23.8 | +7.2 |
| Registered electors | | 4,777 | | |
| Labour hold | | Swing | | |

=== Hudsons ===
Hudsons by-election, 14 July 1977
| Party | Candidate | Votes | % | ±% |
|---|---|---|---|---|
| Labour | Frederick Jones | 1,024 | 53.9 | −18.0 |
| Conservative | Edward J. Oakes | 438 | 23.0 | N/A |
| National Front | Robert D. V. Ray | 290 | 15.2 | −12.9 |
| Residents | George V. S. Nottage | 103 | 5.4 | N/A |
| Liberal | Margaret Bahr | 47 | 2.5 | N/A |
| Majority | | 586 | 30.9 | N/A |
| Turnout | | | 23.8 | −6.6 |
| Registered electors | | 8,002 | | |
| Labour hold | | Swing | | |
