= Enfield London Borough Council elections =

UK local elections

A map showing the wards of Enfield from 2002 until 2022

Enfield London Borough Council in London, England is elected every four years. Since the last boundary changes in 2022, 63 councillors have been elected from 25 wards.

== Political control ==
Since 1964 political control of the council has been held by the following parties:

Election	Overall Control	Labour	Conservative	Lib Dem	S.C.F.	Green
1964	Labour	31	29	-	-	-
1968	Conservative	9	51	-	-	-
1971	Conservative	28	32	-	-	-
1974	Conservative	29	30	1	-	-
1978	Conservative	19	41	-	-	-
1982	Conservative	19	47	-	-	-
1986	Conservative	28	38	-	-	-
1990	Conservative	32	34	-	-	-
1994	Labour	41	25	-	-	-
1998	Labour	43	23	-	-	-
2002	Conservative	24	39	-	-	-
2006	Conservative	27	34	-	2	-
2010	Labour	36	27	-	-	-
2014	Labour	41	22	-	-	-
2018	Labour	46	17	-	-	-
2022	Labour	38	25	-	-	-
2026	No Overall Control	27	31	-	-	5

== Council elections ==
- 1964 Enfield London Borough Council election
- 1968 Enfield London Borough Council election
- 1971 Enfield London Borough Council election
- 1974 Enfield London Borough Council election
- 1978 Enfield London Borough Council election
- 1982 Enfield London Borough Council election (boundary changes increased the number of seats by six)
- 1986 Enfield London Borough Council election
- 1990 Enfield London Borough Council election
- 1994 Enfield London Borough Council election (boundary changes took place but the number of seats remained the same) (Note: The Essex, Greater London and Hertfordshire (County and London Borough Boundaries) Order 1993) (Note: The Essex and Greater London (County and London Borough Boundaries) Order 1993) (Note: The North London Boroughs (London Borough Boundaries) Order 1993)
- 1998 Enfield London Borough Council election
- 2002 Enfield London Borough Council election (boundary changes reduced the number of seats by three)
- 2006 Enfield London Borough Council election
- 2010 Enfield London Borough Council election
- 2014 Enfield London Borough Council election
- 2018 Enfield London Borough Council election
- 2022 Enfield London Borough Council election (boundary changes took place but the number of seats remained the same)
- 2026 Enfield London Borough Council election

== Borough result maps ==
2002 results map

2006 results map

2010 results map

2014 results map

2018 results map

2022 results map

2026 results map

== By-election results ==
=== 1964-1968 ===
There were no by-elections.

=== 1968-1971 ===
Chase by-election, 4 July 1968
Party	Candidate	Votes	%	±%
Conservative	J. A. Alcock	1,120		
Labour	M. W. Langford	332		
Liberal	R. A. J. Eames	209		
Turnout			27.4%	

Church Street by-election, 4 July 1968
Party	Candidate	Votes	%	±%
Conservative	R. W. Fenn	1,296		
Labour	J. E. Lightfoot	405		
Liberal	J. E. Cross	119		
Turnout			25.5%	

Grange by-election, 4 July 1968
Party	Candidate	Votes	%	±%
Conservative	T. G. G. Joel	1,350		
Liberal	J. P. J. Ellis	186		
Labour	H. Hayward	70		
Turnout			25.1%	

Palmers Green by-election, 4 July 1968
Party	Candidate	Votes	%	±%
Conservative	H. G. S. Groves	1,410		
Conservative	W. Robinson	1,403		
Liberal	A. M. Lloyd	266		
Liberal	E. D. Staunton	235		
Labour	A. M. Herbert	82		
Labour	B. M. Barbuk	79		
Turnout			23.9%	

Winchmore Hill by-election, 1 May 1969
Party	Candidate	Votes	%	±%
Conservative	D. Solomons	1,357		
Liberal	J. G. Bathe	386		
Labour	R. Harley	80		
Turnout			28.3%	

Church Street by-election, 25 September 1969
Party	Candidate	Votes	%	±%
Conservative	E. C. Cousins	1,259		
Labour	R. Daultry	548		
Liberal	L. C. I. Barrows	144		
Turnout			27.8%	

=== 1971-1974 ===
Arnos by-election, 24 June 1971
Party	Candidate	Votes	%	±%
Labour	A. D. Veitch	1,241		
Conservative	H. A. Farbey	1,164		
Liberal	D. C. Jaggers	79		
Turnout			37.7%	

Bush Hill South by-election, 24 June 1971
Party	Candidate	Votes	%	±%
Conservative	J. A. Wyatt	991		
Labour	A. E. Kerr	469		
Liberal	L. C. I. Barrows	127		
Turnout			25.7%	

Church Street by-election, 24 June 1971
Party	Candidate	Votes	%	±%
Conservative	C. C. Goldwater	1,409		
Labour	M. R. Tarling	1,290		
Liberal	E. King	82		
Turnout			37.3%	

West by-election, 24 June 1971
Party	Candidate	Votes	%	±%
Conservative	W. J. Stiles	1,236		
Labour	H. Hayward	247		
Liberal	S. M. Macleod	151		
Turnout			20.2%	

Willow by-election, 30 September 1971
Party	Candidate	Votes	%	±%
Conservative	A. E. L. Moulder	1,168		
Labour	F. J. Brown	1,149		
Liberal	J. O. Howson	671		
Turnout			40.7%	

=== 1974-1978 ===
Winchmore Hill by-election, 30 October 1975
Party	Candidate	Votes	%	±%
Conservative	Guy R. Stainton	1,363		
Liberal	David A. Dearing	536		
Labour	Edith P. B. Sinclair	173		
National Front	Richard Prince	92		
Turnout			33.2	

Enfield Wash by-election, 27 November 1975
Party	Candidate	Votes	%	±%
Labour	Walter J. Sheffield	778		
Liberal	Beryl J. Hamilton	654		
Conservative	Robert H. Millward	433		
National Front	Royston C. Pert	117		
Turnout			33.5	

Craig Park by-election, 8 April 1976
Party	Candidate	Votes	%	±%
Labour	Dorothy M. Simmons	1,124		
Conservative	Winifred A. Reardon	326		
National Front	Mark W. Lavine	196		
Liberal	Steven L. Watts	100		
Turnout			30.5	

Enfield Wash by-election, 8 April 1976
Party	Candidate	Votes	%	±%
Labour	Wilfred E. Davies	1,196		
Liberal	Beryl J. Hamilton	932		
Conservative	Robert H. Millward	572		
National Front	Royston C. Pert	157		
Turnout			46.6	

Bush Hill by-election, 17 June 1976
Party	Candidate	Votes	%	±%
Conservative	Robert J. G. Hamer	981		
Labour	Leonard V. Nicolls	903		
Liberal	John R. G. Dibble	460		
National Front	Steven W. Hook	361		
Independent Ratepayers Association	Dennis J. E. Keighley	141		
Turnout			45.9	

New Park by-election, 17 June 1976
Party	Candidate	Votes	%	±%
Conservative	Winifred A. Reardon	1,317		
Labour	Peter Perryman	853		
National Front	John C. Welford	328		
Liberal	Laurna C. I. Barrows	127		
Turnout			44.1	

=== 1990-1994 ===
Hoe Lane by-election, 10 January 1991
Party	Candidate	Votes	%	±%
Conservative	Paul A. Watts	887	48.2	
Labour	Vera A. B. Horridge	852	46.3	
Liberal Democrats	Sheila M. Macleod	58	3.2	
Green	Marghanita Hollands	43	2.3	
Turnout			27.7	
Conservative gain from Labour		Swing		

The by-election was called following the death of Cllr Vladimir Goddard.

Town by-election, 10 January 1991
Party	Candidate	Votes	%	±%
Conservative	Audrey D. Thacker	1,377	58.3	
Labour	Nigel S. Twose	685	29.0	
Liberal Democrats	Boris Whycer	247	10.5	
Green	Frederick W. Clark	54	2.3	
Turnout			39.8	
Conservative hold		Swing		

The by-election was called following the death of Cllr Roger Brooke.

Worcesters by-election, 17 September 1992
Party	Candidate	Votes	%	±%
Conservative	David M. Evans	1,230	48.8	
Labour	Paul Forrest	1,130	44.8	
Liberal Democrats	John K. Hall	162	6.4	
Turnout			40.3	
Conservative hold		Swing		

The by-election was called following the resignation of Cllr James Porter.

=== 1994-1998 ===
Enfield Lock by-election, 27 April 1995
Party	Candidate	Votes	%	±%
Labour	John W. Gorton	1,348		
Conservative	Richard C. Stacy	645		
Liberal Democrats	Timothy E. R. Hoof	729		
Turnout				
Labour gain from Labour Co-op		Swing		

The by-election was called following the death of Cllr Patrick Horridge.

St Aphege by-election, 12 December 1996
Party	Candidate	Votes	%	±%
Labour	Derek Goddard	1,218	67.1	
Conservative	Roger D. Vince	530	29.2	
Liberal Democrats	Stephen A. Savva	66	3.6	
Majority		688	37.9	
Turnout		1,814	29.8	
Labour hold		Swing		

The by-election was called following the death of Cllr Leonard Nicholls.

St Marks by-election, 17 July 1997
Party	Candidate	Votes	%	±%
Labour	Stephen Allen	641	48.6	−5.8
Conservative	Celia P. McNeice	529	40.1	+3.5
UKIP	Gwyneth W. Rolph	85	6.5	+6.5
Liberal Democrats	Sarah E. Lea	63	4.8	−5.8
Majority		112	8.5	
Turnout		1,318	25.3	
Labour hold		Swing		

The by-election was called following the resignation of Cllr David Mason.

Worcesters by-election, 21 August 1997 (2)
Party	Candidate	Votes	%	±%
Conservative	Anthony Dey	967		
Conservative	Austin F. Spreadbury	936		
Labour	Edward W. Parsons	792		
Labour	George R. Reeve	790		
UKIP	Jose H. O'Ware	185		
Liberal Democrats	Fiona J. Macleod	98		
Liberal Democrats	Kenneth J. Keen	83		
Turnout		3,851	29.9	
Conservative hold		Swing		
Conservative gain from Labour		Swing		

The by-election was called following the resignation of Cllrs William Chapman and Mark Evans.

=== 1998-2002 ===
Arnos by-election, 3 December 1998
Party	Candidate	Votes	%	±%
Labour	Vivien M. Giladi	608	44.0	−19.3
Conservative	Martin C. Robertson	499	36.1	+20.0
Independent Labour	Richard Course	190	13.8	+0.8
Liberal Democrats	David R. S. Peters	85	6.2	−2.1
Majority		109	7.9	
Turnout		1,382	24.7	
Labour hold		Swing		

The by-election was called following the resignation of Cllr Ian Borkett.

Chase by-election, 23 August 2001
Party	Candidate	Votes	%	±%
Conservative	Matthew Laban	937	53.5	+8.4
Labour	Terence McManus	461	26.3	−15.7
Liberal Democrats	Christopher J. A. Jephcott	318	18.2	+5.3
Green	Laura E. Davenport	35	2.0	+2.0
Majority		476	27.2	
Turnout		1,751	30.0	
Conservative hold		Swing		

The by-election was called following the death of Cllr Peggy Ford.

=== 2002-2006 ===
Chase by-election, 15 April 2004
Party	Candidate	Votes	%	±%
Conservative	Annette Dreblow	1,365	65.3	+4.8
Labour	Barry Schwartz	409	19.6	−5.0
Liberal Democrats	Thomas Oswald	319	15.2	+0.2
Majority		956	45.7	
Turnout		2,093	23.8	
Conservative hold		Swing		

The by-election was called following the resignation of Cllr Alasdair Macphail.

Lower Edmonton by-election, 10 June 2004
Party	Candidate	Votes	%	±%
Labour	Ahmet Oykener	1,325	41.5	+1.3
Conservative	Kamuran M. Kadir	901	28.3	−2.3
UKIP	Frederick J. Rolph	491	15.4	+15.4
Liberal Democrats	Doreen Dankyi	472	14.8	
Majority		424	13.2	
Turnout		3,189	36.6	
Labour hold		Swing		

The by-election was called following the resignation of Cllr Gerard McAllister.

=== 2006-2010 ===
Turkey Street by-election, 10 August 2006
Party	Candidate	Votes	%	±%
Conservative	Matthew W. Laban	877	40.1	−0.2
Labour	Derek Levy	874	40.0	+11.3
UKIP	Madeline Jones	174	8.0	+8.0
Save Chase Farm	Sujal Zaveri	133	6.1	+6.1
Liberal Democrats	David R. S. Peters	77	3.5	+3.5
Green	William A. Linton	51	2.3	+2.3
Majority		3	0.1	
Turnout		2,186	24.7	
Conservative hold		Swing		

The by-election was called following the resignation of Cllr Margaret Holt.

Bush Hill Park by-election, 8 January 2009
Party	Candidate	Votes	%	±%
Conservative	Adrian W. Croshaw	1,320	63.4	+25.4
Labour	Ivor Wiggett	413	19.8	+6.7
Liberal Democrats	Paul D. Smith	129	6.2	−3.0
UKIP	Frederick J. Rolph	123	5.9	+0.9
Green	Jack Johnson	97	4.7	−5.5
Majority		907	43.6	
Turnout		2,082	20.5	
Conservative hold		Swing		

The by-election was called following the death of Cllr John Jackson.

Jubilee by-election, 12 February 2009
Party	Candidate	Votes	%	±%
Labour	Rohini Simbodyal	1,346	51.3	+7.8
Conservative	Ricky G. G. Deller	1,049	40.0	−3.4
Liberal Democrats	Dawn C. Barnes	69	2.6	+2.6
Green	Douglas Coker	60	2.3	−10.9
UKIP	Madge Jones	59	2.2	+2.2
Independent	Sarah McDonald	41	1.6	+1.6
Majority		297	11.3	
Turnout		2,624	29.2	
Labour gain from Conservative		Swing		

The by-election was called following the death of Cllr Christopher Andrew.

=== 2010-2014 ===
Bush Hill Park by-election, 28 July 2011
Party	Candidate	Votes	%	±%
Conservative	Lee Chamberlain	1,108	44.5	+6.1
Labour	Ivor Wiggett	668	26.8	+2.0
Independent	Tony Kingsworth	230	9.2	+9.2
Liberal Democrats	Paul Smith	177	7.1	−12.3
Green	Douglas Coker	100	4.0	−6.5
UKIP	Gwyneth Rolph	70	2.8	−4.1
BNP	Stephen Squire	61	2.5	+2.5
Christian	Clive Morrison	45	1.8	+1.8
English Democrat	Ben Weald	29	1.2	+1.2
Majority		440	17.7	
Turnout		2,488	23.8	
Conservative hold		Swing		

The by-election was called following the resignation of Cllr Eleftherios Savva.

=== 2014-2018 ===
Jubilee by-election, 7 May 2015
Party	Candidate	Votes	%	±%
Labour	Nesil Cazimoglu	3,313	59.2%	
Conservative	Nazim Celebi	1,339	23.9%	
UKIP	Sharon Downer	602	10.8%	
Green	Benjamin Maydon	229	4.2%	
Liberal Democrats	Matt McLaren	108	1.9%	
Majority		1,974	11.3	
Turnout		5,591	59.4	
Labour hold		Swing		

The by-election was called following the resignation of Cllr Rohini Simbodyal. It was held on 7 May 2015, concurrent with the UK general election.

Enfield Highway by-election, 18 May 2017
Party	Candidate	Votes	%	±%
Labour	Elif Erbil	2,155	63.8%	
Conservative	Christine Bellas	973	28.8%	
Green	Kate McGeevor	104	3.1%	
UKIP	Sharon Downer	91	2.7%	
Liberal Democrats	Matt McLaren	54	1.6%	
Majority		1,182	35%	
Turnout		3,377	32.21%	
Labour hold		Swing		

The by-election was called following the resignation of Cllr Ozzie Uzoanya.

Enfield Highway by-election, 7 December 2017
Party	Candidate	Votes	%	±%
Labour	Ergun Eren	1,619	69.8%	
Conservative	Andrew Thorp	620	26.7%	
Green	Andreea Malin	79	3.4%	
Majority		999	43.1%	
Turnout		2,318	22.00%	
Labour hold		Swing		

The by-election was called following the death of Cllr Turgut Esendagli.

=== 2018-2022 ===
Bush Hill Park by-election, 12 November 2018
Party	Candidate	Votes	%	±%
Conservative	James Hockney	1,540	52.4	+12.9
Labour	Bevin Betton	828	28.2	−9.0
Liberal Democrats	Robert Wilson	313	10.7	+1.0
Green	Benjamin Maydon	127	4.3	−6.5
Women's Equality	Tulip Hambleton	79	2.7	+2.7
Independent	Erol Ovayolu	50	1.7	+1.7
Majority		712	24.2	
Turnout		2,937		
Conservative hold		Swing		

The by-election was called following the resignation of Cllr Jon Daniels.

Chase by-election, 6 May 2021
Party	Candidate	Votes	%	±%
Conservative	Andrew Thorp	2,138	44.0	+10.4
Labour	Chris James	1,775	36.5	−2.3
Liberal Democrats	Guy Russo	517	10.6	−3.3
Green	Lynne Davies	374	7.7	−1.8
TUSC	Mira Glavardanov	58	1.2	+1.2
Majority		363	7.5	
Turnout		4,862		
Conservative gain from Labour		Swing		

The by-election was called following the resignation of Cllr Vicki Pite.

Jubilee by-election, 6 May 2021
Party	Candidate	Votes	%	±%
Labour	Chinelo Anyanwu	2,170	55.7	−5.6
Conservative	Benny Neza	1,070	27.5	+5.3
Green	Bill Linton	321	8.2	+1.1
Liberal Democrats	Iman Saadoune	171	4.4	−0.2
Taking the Initiative	Clive Morrison	100	2.6	+2.6
TUSC	Lewis Peacock	63	1.6	+1.6
Majority		1,100	28.2	
Turnout		3,895		
Labour hold		Swing		

The by-election was called following the resignation of Cllr Bernadette Lappage.

Southbury by-election, 6 May 2021
Party	Candidate	Votes	%	±%
Labour	Ayten Guzel	1,961	46.6	−10.9
Conservative	Patrick Drysdale	1,380	32.8	+8.9
Green	Luke Balnave	470	11.2	−0.2
Liberal Democrats	Luke Cummings	246	5.8	−1.3
TUSC	John Dolan	82	1.9	+1.9
We Matter	Hughie Rose	37	0.9	+0.9
Taking the Initiative	Jheni Morrison	36	0.9	+0.9
Majority		581	13.8	
Turnout		4,212		
Labour hold		Swing		

The by-election was called following the death of Cllr Chris Bond.

Bush Hill Park by-election, 1 July 2021
Party	Candidate	Votes	%	±%
Conservative	Peter Fallart	1,694	55.2	+15.7
Labour	Nia Stevens	875	28.5	−8.7
Green	Benjamin Maydon	233	7.6	−3.2
Liberal Democrats	Ade Adetula	225	7.3	−2.4
TUSC	John Dolan	27	0.9	+0.9
Taking the Initiative	Clive Morrison	15	0.5	+0.5
Majority		819	26.7	
Turnout		3,069		
Conservative hold		Swing		

The by-election was called following the resignation of Cllr Will Coleshill.

=== 2022-2026 ===
Bullsmoor by-election, 20 April 2023
Party	Candidate	Votes	%	±%
Labour	Destiny Karakus	1,056	55.8	+4.6
Conservative	Christine Bellas	686	36.2	+6.4
Green	Isobel Whittaker	81	4.3	−5.1
Liberal Democrats	Tim Martin	50	2.6	−5.0
TUSC	John Dolan	20	1.1	−0.9
Majority		370	19.5	
Turnout		1,893		
Labour hold		Swing		

The by-election was called following the resignation of Cllr Esin Gunes.

Jubilee by-election, 28 November 2024
Party	Candidate	Votes	%	±%
Labour	Ian Barnes	853	39.4	−13.9
Conservative	Masud Uddin	691	31.9	+8.6
Independent	Khalid Sadur	208	9.6	+9.6
Green	Katie Knight	169	7.8	−2.4
Reform	Neville Watson	149	6.9	+6.9
Liberal Democrats	Tim Martin	94	4.3	−1.9
Majority		162	7.5	
Turnout		2,164		
Labour hold		Swing		

The by-election was called following the resignation of Cllr Nesil Caliskan.
