= Barnet and Chase Farm Hospitals NHS Trust =

Healthcare trust in England

- Type: NHS hospital trust
- Region served: Enfield and Barnet (Greater London)
- Budget: £250m. income (2005/6)
- Chair: Margaret Wall
- Chief executive: Dr. Tim Peachey
- Staff: 3400 direct (plus employees of PFI consortium)
- Website: (archived 2014)

Barnet and Chase Farm Hospitals NHS Trust was a NHS hospital trust of the National Health Service in England, responsible for Barnet Hospital and Chase Farm Hospital, both of which are in North London. On 1 July 2014 Barnet and Chase Farm NHS Foundation Trust became part of the Royal Free London NHS Foundation Trust, which now comprises Barnet Hospital, Chase Farm Hospital and the Royal Free Hospital.

The Trust was formed in 1999 at a time when many hospitals were merged for administrative and managerial reasons, in an attempt to create organisations with sufficient 'critical mass' to deal with a range of patient services. However rationalisation of services between the hospitals was slow to materialise, due in part to the PFI structure of Barnet Hospital, and in part to the reluctance of the local population and politicians to countenance concentration of specific services at only one location.

The two trust hospitals treat over 500,000 patients per year; these come not only from Barnet and Enfield but also from East Harrow, South Hertfordshire, West Essex and Waltham Forest.

Plans to rationalise some services between the hospitals led to a number of protests, including the formation of the "Save Chase Farm" party (2006-2010) which at one time had two members elected to the local council of the London Borough of Enfield. Final agreement to these changes, including the closure of the maternity and accident and emergency services at Chase Farm, came about in 2014.

In May 2013, Barnet and Chase Farm Hospitals released a YouTube video, 'Use This Handwash Style!', as part of a major new hand hygiene campaign. The video amended the lyrics to hit song Gangnam Style to remind staff about the seven stages of handwashing. Featuring over 300 members of staff from several departments washing their hands whilst dancing to the song, it became an unexpected online hit, averaging over a thousand views a day in the first week of its release.

Staff from both hospital sites later made another music video – a Mariah Carey tribute entitled 'I Don't Want A Christmas With Flu' – to promote the use of flu vaccinations. This was released on YouTube in November 2013 and also became a minor viral hit, enthusiastically supported by both Mariah Carey's fan pages on Facebook and even the Metro newspaper.

In October 2013 the trust was said to have the lowest spend on in-patient's meals in the country at £4.15 per day.

In November 2013 it was revealed that more than 2000 patients waiting for surgery had not been registered on the waiting list, and that 242 had waited more than a year for treatment. It was said that this was a software problem. A review of 7,174 patients subject to delay by the Royal Free Trust in April 2015 found that one patient may have suffered “serious harm” and 39 “moderate harm”. 1,541 patients were sent to private providers between July 2014 and April 2015, predominately for endoscopy and ear, nose and throat treatments.

The Trust predicted a deficit of £16.9m in 2013–14. Later in 2014 it was merged with Royal Free London NHS Foundation Trust.

== See also ==
- Healthcare in London
- List of NHS trusts
