= 2014 Enfield London Borough Council election =

2014 local election in England

2014 Enfield Borough Council election
- 22 May 2014

All 63 seats to Enfield London Borough Council 35 seats needed for a majority

	First party	Second party
Party	Labour	Conservative
Last election	36 seats, 34.7%	27 seats, 34.3%
Seats won	41	22
Seat change	▲5	▼5
Popular vote	40,003	25,082
Percentage	42.4%	26.6%
Swing	▲7.7%	▼7.7%
- Map of the results of the 2014 Enfield council election. Conservatives in blue and Labour in red.
Council control before election
Labour
Council control after election
Labour

The 2014 Enfield Council election took place on 22 May 2014 to elect members of Enfield London Borough Council in London, England. The whole council was up for election and the Labour party retained overall control of the council, increasing their majority over the Conservative party by five seats.

== Background ==
The last election in 2010 saw Labour winning a majority with 36 seats, compared to 27 for the Conservatives. No other parties held seats.

== Election result ==
Labour retained control, winning 41 seats, five of them gained from the Conservatives who dropped to 22 seats. Labour dominated in the east and south of the borough, retaining all their existing seats, while the Conservatives held most of their seats in the centre and west of the borough, though they lost two seats to Labour in Southgate Green ward, as well as single seats in Bush Hill Park, Chase and Winchmore Hill wards. For the second consecutive election, there was no representation from other parties on the council.

The Greens fielded candidates in every ward for the second successive election and finished third in the election in terms of votes cast. The Liberal Democrats performed poorly: standing in only eight of the 21 wards and only picking up 1% of the overall vote, they finished fifth, with UKIP in fourth.

Save Chase Farm, who won three seats on the council in 2006, did not stand any candidates after the closure of the A&E department at Chase Farm Hospital, though one of their former councillors, Kieran McGregor, stood for the National Health Action Party in Town ward. The BNP and TUSC also fielded candidates. There were also five independent candidates.

== Ward results ==
Bowes (3)
Party	Candidate	Votes	%	±%
Labour	Yasemin Brett	2,249	63.2	+18.7
Labour	Achilleas Georgiou	2,055	57.8	+15.5
Labour	Alan Sitkin	1,908	53.7	+19.7
Conservative	Atilla Arslan	789	22.2	−5.4
Conservative	Philip Stover	721	20.3	−4.3
Conservative	Dimpi Dattani	658	18.5	−5.2
Green	Trevor Doughty	526	14.8	−3.1
Green	Geoff Kemball-Cook	485	13.6	+1.9
TUSC	Craig Diggins	122	3.4	N/A
TUSC	Oliver Mehmet	120	3.4	N/A
TUSC	Frank Curtis	116	3.3	N/A
Turnout		3,556	38.2	
Labour hold		Swing		
Labour hold		Swing		
Labour hold		Swing		

Bush Hill Park (3)
Party	Candidate	Votes	%	±%
Conservative	Lee Chamberlain	1,679	42.2	−5.8
Labour	Sarah Doyle	1,522	38.3	+9.4
Conservative	Erin Celebi	1,521	38.3	−6.5
Conservative	Martin Prescott	1,334	33.6	−11.2
Labour	Grace Loake	1,277	32.1	+1.1
Labour	Ivor Wiggett	1,223	30.8	+2.3
UKIP	Gwyneth Rolph	897	22.6	+14.0
Green	Douglas Coker	621	15.6	+2.5
Liberal Democrats	George Achillea	453	11.4	−12.9
Turnout		3,974	37.8	
Conservative hold		Swing		
Labour gain from Conservative		Swing		
Conservative hold		Swing		

Chase (3)
Party	Candidate	Votes	%	±%
Labour	Vicki Pite	1,633	39.7	+12.2
Conservative	Peter Fallart	1,607	39.1	−6.2
Conservative	Nick Dines	1,590	38.7	−2.1
Labour	Christopher Cole	1,525	37.1	+6.9
Conservative	Lindsay Rawlings	1,416	34.4	−5.2
Labour	Geoffrey Robinson	1,326	32.2	+5.6
UKIP	David Schofield	876	21.3	+12.5
Green	Kate McGeevor	726	17.7	+5.5
Liberal Democrats	Matt McLaren	295	7.2	−11.8
Turnout		4,113	42.7	
Labour gain from Conservative		Swing		
Conservative hold		Swing		
Conservative hold		Swing		

Cockfosters (3)
Party	Candidate	Votes	%	±%
Conservative	Jason Charalambous	1,962	55.4	−3.6
Conservative	Michael Lavender	1,804	50.9	−7.9
Conservative	Anne-Marie Pearce	1,769	49.9	+1.3
Labour	Betty Costello	1,048	29.6	+6.2
Labour	Timothy Leaver	947	26.7	+5.1
Labour	Hassan Yusuf	806	22.7	−0.2
UKIP	Tony Douglas	509	14.4	N/A
Green	Joe Phillips	422	11.9	+1.6
Liberal Democrats	Steven Deller	236	6.7	−13.3
Turnout		3,543	34.8	
Conservative hold		Swing		
Conservative hold		Swing		
Conservative hold		Swing		

Edmonton Green (3)
Party	Candidate	Votes	%	±%
Labour	Christiana During	2,597	70.9	+10.6
Labour	Abdul Abdullahi	2,551	69.6	+11.1
Labour	Andrew Stafford	2,496	68.1	+16.1
Conservative	Cabdi Aakhiro	480	13.1	−12.8
Conservative	Mutlu Beyzade	466	12.7	−8.2
Conservative	Petro Mema	383	10.5	−8.3
Green	Geri Saccomanno	344	9.4	+0.8
TUSC	Lewis Peacock	302	8.2	N/A
TUSC	Patrick Baker	254	6.9	N/A
TUSC	David Rayfield	195	5.3	N/A
Turnout		3,665	36.0	
Labour hold		Swing		
Labour hold		Swing		
Labour hold		Swing		

Enfield Highway (3)
Party	Candidate	Votes	%	±%
Labour	Christine Hamilton	2,031	58.1	+8.6
Labour	Turgut Esendagli	1,959	56.0	+8.6
Labour	Ahmet Hasan	1,848	52.9	+5.9
Conservative	Dave Boston	842	24.1	−9.5
Conservative	Seton During	788	22.5	−5.6
UKIP	David Jeal	774	22.1	+13.2
Conservative	Vijay Sujan	547	15.6	−12.3
Green	Liz Wright	409	11.7	+4.5
BNP	Gary O'Connor	289	8.3	+0.9
Turnout		3,496	34.0	
Labour hold		Swing		
Labour hold		Swing		
Labour hold		Swing		

Enfield Lock (3)
Party	Candidate	Votes	%	±%
Labour	Krystle Fonyonga	2,395	61.4	+11.6
Labour	Nneka Keazor	2,203	56.5	+11.2
Labour	Ozzie Uzoanya	2,189	56.1	+12.9
UKIP	Sharon Downer	829	21.2	+12.5
Conservative	Mark Leonard	725	18.6	−12.8
Conservative	Michael Fadaka	683	17.5	−12.6
Conservative	Michael Kisubi	537	13.8	−14.6
Green	David Greening	443	11.4	+2.1
BNP	Jason Keogh	296	7.6	−0.1
Turnout		3,902	37.7	
Labour hold		Swing		
Labour hold		Swing		
Labour hold		Swing		

Grange (3)
Party	Candidate	Votes	%	±%
Conservative	Andy Milne	2,172	53.3	−3.7
Conservative	Terence Neville	2,039	50.0	−7.7
Conservative	Eric Jukes	1,968	48.3	−6.7
Labour	Hazel Kinsler	1,175	28.8	+4.5
Labour	Vanessa Skarpari	925	22.7	+0.5
Labour	David South	871	21.4	−0.2
UKIP	Graham Letchford	681	16.7	N/A
Green	Mark Fenton	593	14.5	+2.1
Green	Joy Winterbottom	442	10.8	N/A
Liberal Democrats	Paul Smith	303	7.4	−11.4
Turnout		4,076	40.7	
Conservative hold		Swing		
Conservative hold		Swing		
Conservative hold		Swing		

Haselbury (3)
Party	Candidate	Votes	%	±%
Labour	Suna Hurman	2,245	61.9	+9.3
Labour	George Savva	2,120	58.5	+3.8
Labour	Haydar Ulus	2,025	55.9	+4.8
Conservative	Adrian Croshaw	786	21.7	−8.5
Conservative	Gonul Daniels	605	16.7	−8.7
UKIP	Aidan Harris	566	15.6	N/A
Conservative	Mike Fessehazion	442	12.2	−12.3
Green	Laura Davenport	416	11.5	+1.8
TUSC	Mehmet Goztas	374	10.3	N/A
Turnout		3,625	36.7	
Labour hold		Swing		
Labour hold		Swing		
Labour hold		Swing		

Highlands (3)
Party	Candidate	Votes	%	±%
Conservative	Lee David-Sanders	2,076	50.2	−7.9
Conservative	Glynis Vince	2,002	48.4	−5.4
Conservative	Dogan Delman	1,982	47.9	−9.4
Labour	Joanne Hamilton	1,262	30.5	+3.4
Labour	Christopher Deacon	1,241	30.0	+7.0
Labour	Vincent Sutherland	908	22.0	+3.2
UKIP	Jeff Evans	864	20.9	N/A
Green	David Flint	693	16.8	+5.5
Turnout		4,134	40.4	
Conservative hold		Swing		
Conservative hold		Swing		
Conservative hold		Swing		

Jubilee (3)
Party	Candidate	Votes	%	±%
Labour	Alev Cazimoglu	2,142	61.4	+11.1
Labour	Bernie Lappage	1,984	56.9	+6.7
Labour	Rohini Simbodyal	1,939	55.6	+8.6
Conservative	Nazim Celebi	730	20.9	−13.1
UKIP	Clive Morrison	633	18.2	N/A
Conservative	Tom Waterhouse	604	17.3	−16.8
Conservative	Alper Kurtaran	603	17.3	−13.0
Green	Benjamin Maydon	299	8.6	+0.6
Turnout		3,487	38.3	
Labour hold		Swing		
Labour hold		Swing		
Labour hold		Swing		

Lower Edmonton (3)
Party	Candidate	Votes	%	±%
Labour	Guney Dogan	2,478	72.6	+14.8
Labour	Nesimi Erbil	2,333	68.4	+13.0
Labour	Adeline Kepez	2,149	63.0	+8.1
UKIP	Brenda Letchford	556	16.3	N/A
Conservative	Joseph da Cruz	438	12.8	−15.8
Conservative	Ozkan Gezici	427	12.5	−9.7
Green	Richard Bray	426	12.5	+2.0
Conservative	Alok Agrawal	389	11.4	−9.9
Turnout		3,411	35.7	
Labour hold		Swing		
Labour hold		Swing		
Labour hold		Swing		

Palmers Green (3)
Party	Candidate	Votes	%	±%
Labour	Bambos Charalambous	2,224	56.2	+3.7
Labour	Mary Maguire	2,084	52.7	+6.5
Labour	Ahmet Oykener	1,824	46.1	+8.2
Conservative	Beyzade Beyzade	987	25.0	−8.7
Conservative	Natasha McDermott	956	24.2	−9.4
Conservative	Amy Yiannitsarou	861	21.8	−9.6
Independent	Costas Georgiou	668	16.9	N/A
Green	Nicholas Wall	641	16.2	+4.9
Liberal Democrats	Brendan Malone	299	7.6	−12.7
BNP	Angelos Gavriel	158	4.0	+0.4
Turnout		3,955	38.2	
Labour hold		Swing		
Labour hold		Swing		
Labour hold		Swing		

Ponders End (3)
Party	Candidate	Votes	%	±%
Labour	Doug Taylor	2,209	65.5	+10.1
Labour	Ayfer Orhan	2,208	65.5	+12.2
Labour	Donald McGowan	2,204	65.4	+8.7
Conservative	Tugba Gungor	565	16.8	−10.6
Conservative	Andrew Stedman	513	15.2	−10.5
Conservative	Kamuran Kadir	497	14.7	−9.2
Green	Rod Goodyer	384	11.4	+1.9
BNP	William Walton	223	6.6	N/A
TUSC	Paul Kershaw	171	5.1	N/A
Independent	Marian Lukasik	133	3.9	N/A
TUSC	Joseph Simpson	113	3.4	N/A
Turnout		3,371	36.2	
Labour hold		Swing		
Labour hold		Swing		
Labour hold		Swing		

Southbury (3)
Party	Candidate	Votes	%	±%
Labour	Chris Bond	2,148	56.5	+10.4
Labour	Derek Levy	1,875	49.3	+8.7
Labour	Jansev Jemal	1,759	46.3	+3.1
Conservative	Adele Panayi	859	22.6	−8.6
Conservative	Gerrad Olisa-Ashar	801	21.1	−18.1
Conservative	Stephen Savva	738	19.4	−17.0
UKIP	Fred Rolph	719	18.9	+10.5
Green	Tom Duce	467	12.3	+2.3
Independent	Garry Kousoulou	357	9.4	N/A
BNP	Marie Nicholas	233	6.1	N/A
TUSC	John Dolan	157	4.1	N/A
TUSC	Mirjana Glavardanov	115	3.0	N/A
Turnout		3,803	39.2	
Labour hold		Swing		
Labour hold		Swing		
Labour hold		Swing		

Southgate (3)
Party	Candidate	Votes	%	±%
Conservative	Daniel Pearce	1,714	45.6	+2.7
Conservative	Edward Smith	1,645	43.7	+3.4
Conservative	Robert Hayward	1,579	42.0	−2.7
Labour	Ingrid Cranfield	1,529	40.7	+13.4
Labour	Andreas Constantinides	1,429	38.0	+12.3
Labour	Tahsin Ibrahim	1,319	35.1	+12.3
Green	Peter Krakowiak	640	17.0	+8.8
Liberal Democrats	Alan Stainer	403	10.7	−17.2
Turnout		3,761	36.8	
Conservative hold		Swing		
Conservative hold		Swing		
Conservative hold		Swing		

Southgate Green (3)
Party	Candidate	Votes	%	±%
Labour	Daniel Anderson	1,810	44.2	+6.8
Labour	Claire Stewart	1,678	41.0	+4.2
Conservative	Alessandro Georgiou	1,635	39.9	−3.6
Labour	Rasheed Sadegh-Zadeh	1,433	35.0	+4.0
Conservative	Jon Kaye	1,389	33.9	−7.6
Conservative	Murat Yurtseven	1,257	30.7	−9.6
Green	Fred Clark	601	14.7	−3.3
Green	David Hughes	471	11.5	N/A
UKIP	Mark James	400	9.8	N/A
Liberal Democrats	Lorice Stainer	333	8.1	−17.0
TUSC	Lee Maybin	50	1.2	N/A
TUSC	Dean O'Hanlon	37	0.9	N/A
TUSC	John Stack	36	0.9	N/A
Turnout		4,095	41.6	
Labour gain from Conservative		Swing		
Labour gain from Conservative		Swing		
Conservative hold		Swing		

Town (3)
Party	Candidate	Votes	%	±%
Conservative	Joanne Laban	2,121	43.6	−2.7
Conservative	Michael Rye	2,098	43.1	−5.8
Conservative	Jim Steven	1,925	39.6	−8.4
Labour	Catriona Bearryman	1,485	30.5	+4.2
Labour	Ian Hamilton	1,446	29.7	+3.8
Labour	Chris Murphy	1,186	24.4	+3.6
UKIP	William Henwood	810	16.7	N/A
UKIP	Bill Price	753	15.5	N/A
NHA	Kieran McGregor	735	15.1	−6.1
Green	Andreea Malin	724	14.9	+0.4
Turnout		4,863	43.9	
Conservative hold		Swing		
Conservative hold		Swing		
Conservative hold		Swing		

Turkey Street (3)
Party	Candidate	Votes	%	±%
Labour	Katherine Chibah	1,925	53.3	+12.1
Labour	Toby Simon	1,819	50.3	+9.2
Labour	Dino Lemonides	1,736	48.0	+7.5
Conservative	Yvonne Lawson	848	23.5	−16.0
UKIP	Gary Robbens	805	22.3	+13.6
Conservative	Richard Reynolds	769	21.3	−17.2
Conservative	Karl Scholfield	740	20.5	−10.9
Green	Elizabeth Douglas	380	10.5	+2.2
Independent	Rick Jewell	328	9.1	N/A
BNP	Stephen Squire	278	7.7	−2.5
Turnout		3,613	38.6	
Labour hold		Swing		
Labour hold		Swing		
Labour hold		Swing		

Upper Edmonton (3)
Party	Candidate	Votes	%	±%
Labour	Patricia Ekechi	2,632	71.1	+13.5
Labour	Ali Bakir	2,589	70.0	+13.0
Labour	Doris Jiagge	2,430	65.7	+10.0
Conservative	Niyazi Zihni	573	15.5	−11.6
Conservative	Mel Hussein	569	15.4	−10.7
Conservative	Metin Noyan	563	15.2	−5.9
Green	Richard Ainsworth	560	15.1	+7.4
Turnout		3,701	35.6	
Labour hold		Swing		
Labour hold		Swing		
Labour hold		Swing		

Winchmore Hill (3)
Party	Candidate	Votes	%	±%
Conservative	Elaine Hayward	1,494	40.0	−6.9
Conservative	Ertan Hurer	1,461	39.1	−5.8
Labour	Dinah Barry	1,267	33.9	+4.1
Labour	Anthony Cleary	1,259	33.7	+2.2
Conservative	Maria Zavros	1,225	32.8	−13.2
Labour	Hakki Tilki	909	24.4	−3.1
Green	Alison Phillips	574	15.4	N/A
Green	Bill Linton	555	14.9	N/A
UKIP	Roger James	511	13.7	N/A
Green	Jean Robertson-Molloy	434	11.6	−5.4
Independent	Helen Osman	425	11.4	N/A
Liberal Democrats	Joe Edwards	311	8.3	−17.6
Turnout		3,732	38.3	
Conservative hold		Swing		
Conservative hold		Swing		
Labour gain from Conservative		Swing		
