= Kate Wilkinson =

Kate Wilkinson may refer to:

- Kate Wilkinson (actress)
- Kate Wilkinson (politician)

== See also ==
- Katie Wilkinson, Scottish footballer
- Catherine Wilkinson, leader of local British political party Save Chase Farm
