= Margaret Wall, Baroness Wall of New Barnet =

British trade unionist (1941–2017)

The Right Honourable The Baroness Wall of New Barnet
- Wall in parliament, 2016

Member of the House of Lords
- Lord Temporal
- Life peerage 10 June 2004 – 25 January 2017

Personal details
- Born: 14 November 1941
- Died: 25 January 2017 (aged 75)

Margaret Mary Wall, Baroness Wall of New Barnet (née Mylott, 14 November 1941 – 25 January 2017) was a British trade unionist and the national secretary and head of policy of AMICUS. She was Chair of the national committee of the Labour Party from 2001 to 2002.

== Family ==
Wall was born on 14 November 1941 in Golborne, Lancashire. She was daughter of machinist Thomas Mylott (1908–1970) and his wife Dorothy Mylott (née Walker, 1910–1996). She had two sisters.

On 22 September 1962, Wall married Peter Richard Wall. They had one son and divorced in 1990. On 29 January 1992, she remarried to Edwin Geoffrey Holdsworth .

== Education ==
Wall was educated at Druids Cross Independent School and at Notre Dame Collegiate School in Liverpool. Wall later achieved a diploma in social studies, economics, and politics at the University of Liverpool and studied at Girton College, Cambridge.

== Career ==
After leaving schoolm Wall worked in Liverpool as a shorthand typist for a builder and restorer of pipe organs then for a leather goods manufacturers. Wall joined the trade union the Manufacturing, Science and Finance Union (later merged with the Amalgamated Engineering and Electrical Union in 2001 to become AMICUS). In 1976, Wall was appointed the full time regional officer for south-east England. She rose through the union organisation and later served as national secretary and head of policy.

Wall was also a member of the Labour Party. She was a supporter of Progress, which formed in 1996 to support party leader Tony Blair and his rebranded "New Labour" leadership. On 10 June 2004, Wall was created Baroness Wall of New Barnet, of New Barnet in the London Borough of Barnet. As a Labour backbencher in the House of Lords, she supported increasing the number of apprenticeships in the UK, for which she was awarded an honorary apprenticeship by the Apprenticeship Ambassador Network in 2013.

Wall was also the Chair of Barnet and Chase Farm NHS Hospitals Trust until 2014, when she was appointed Chair of the Board of Directors and Council of Governors of the Milton Keynes Hospital NHS Foundation Trust.

== Death ==
Wall died from stomach cancer on 25 January 2017 at North London Hospice, Finchley, London.

Political offices
Preceded by Maggie Jones	Chair of the National Executive Committee of the Labour Party; 2001–2002	Succeeded by Diana Holland
