= 2018 Enfield London Borough Council election =

2018 local election in England

2018 Enfield Borough Council election
- 3 May 2018

All 63 seats to Enfield London Borough Council 35 seats needed for a majority

	First party	Second party
Party	Labour	Conservative
Last election	41 seats, 52.0%	22 seats, 32.5%
Seats won	46	17
Seat change	▲5	▼5
Popular vote	126,230	80,919
Percentage	54.9%	35.2%
Swing	▲2.9%	▲2.7%
- Map of the results of the 2018 Enfield council election. Conservatives in blue and Labour in red.
Council control before election
Labour
Council control after election
Labour

The 2018 Enfield Council election took place on Thursday 3 May 2018 to elect members of Enfield London Borough Council in London, England. The whole council was up for election and the Labour party retained overall control of the council.

== Background ==
The last election in 2014 saw Labour winning a majority with 41 seats, compared with 22 for the Conservatives. No other parties held seats. This was the first time that Labour were re-elected for a third term.

== Results summary ==
Enfield Council election result 2018
Party	Seats	Gains	Losses	Net gain/loss	Seats %	Votes %	Votes	+/−
Labour	46	7	2	+5	73.0	54.8	126,230	+2.9
Conservative	17	2	7	-5	27.0	35.1	80,919	+2.7
Green	0	0	0	0	0.0	4.5	10,400	-1.7
Liberal Democrats	0	0	0	0	0.0	4.2	9,295	+2.8
Independent	0	0	0	0	0.0	0.5	1,142	-0.4
UKIP	0	0	0	0	0.0	0.5	1,035	-4.7
Women's Equality	0	0	0	0	0.0	0.3	648	New
Democrats and Veterans	0	0	0	0	0.0	0.1	213	New
Duma Polska	0	0	0	0	0.0	0.0	84	New

== Ward results ==
=== Bowes ===
Bowes (3)
Party	Candidate	Votes	%	±%
Labour	Yasemin Brett*	2,386	65.0	+1.8
Labour	Achilleas Georgiou*	2,253	61.4	+3.6
Labour	Elisabeth Chibah*	2,242	61.1	+7.4
Green	Liz Wright	697	19.0	+5.4
Conservative	David Conway	620	16.9	−4.3
Conservative	Alex Hancock	564	15.4	−4.9
Green	Daniel Stachow	552	15.0	N/A
Green	Trevor Doughty	542	14.8	±0.0
Conservative	Ertan Hurer	535	14.6	−3.9
Turnout		3,668	37.3	
Labour hold		Swing		
Labour hold		Swing		
Labour hold		Swing		

Chibah was a councillor for Turkey Street ward prior to the election.

=== Bush Hill Park ===
Bush Hill Park (3)
Party	Candidate	Votes	%	±%
Conservative	Jon Daniels	1,976	45.2	+3.0
Conservative	Will Coleshill	1,959	44.8	+6.5
Conservative	Clare De Silva	1,926	44.1	+10.5
Labour	Bevin Betton	1,862	42.6	+4.3
Labour	Josh Abey	1,831	41.9	+9.8
Labour	Catherine Ejumotan	1,681	38.5	+7.7
Green	Benji Maydon	539	12.3	−3.3
Liberal Democrats	George Achillea	484	11.1	−0.3
UKIP	Gwyneth Rolph	144	3.3	−19.3
Turnout		4,370	41.4	
Conservative hold		Swing		
Conservative gain from Labour		Swing		
Conservative hold		Swing		

=== Chase ===
Dino Lemonides resigned from the Labour Party and joined Community First.

Chase (3)
Party	Candidate	Votes	%	±%
Labour	Hass Yusuf	1,931	44.9	+7.8
Labour	Vicki Pite*	1,852	43.0	+3.3
Labour	Dino Lemonides*	1,729	40.2	+8.0
Conservative	Rishi Fernando	1,670	38.8	+0.1
Conservative	Peter Fallart*	1,643	38.2	−0.9
Conservative	Denise Headley	1,582	36.7	+2.3
Liberal Democrats	Guy Russo	690	16.0	+8.8
Green	Kate McGeevor	473	11.0	−6.7
Liberal Democrats	Helen Wallace	291	6.8	N/A
Liberal Democrats	Gianni Sarra	275	6.4	N/A
UKIP	Rachael Allsop	207	4.8	−16.5
Turnout		4,305	43.0	
Labour hold		Swing		
Labour gain from Conservative		Swing		
Labour gain from Conservative		Swing		

=== Cockfosters ===
Cockfosters (3)
Party	Candidate	Votes	%	±%
Conservative	Elaine Hayward*	2,406	58.7	+3.3
Conservative	Alessandro Georgiou*	2,363	57.6	+6.7
Conservative	Edward Smith*	2,279	55.6	+5.7
Labour	Chris Cole	1,223	29.8	+0.2
Labour	Roz Jones	1,213	29.6	+2.9
Labour	Ryan Hebbs	1,117	27.2	+4.5
Green	Laura Davenport	510	12.4	+0.5
Liberal Democrats	David Peters	459	11.2	+4.5
Turnout		4,100	39.0	
Conservative hold		Swing		
Conservative hold		Swing		
Conservative hold		Swing		

Hayward was a councillor for Winchmore Hill ward prior to the election.

Georgiou was a councillor for Southgate Green ward prior to the election.

Smith was a councillor for Southgate ward prior to the election.

=== Edmonton Green ===
Edmonton Green (3)
Party	Candidate	Votes	%	±%
Labour	Ergin Erbil	2,699	75.1	+4.7
Labour	Tolga Aramaz	2,629	73.2	+3.6
Labour	Mahym Bedekova	2,533	70.5	+2.4
Conservative	Daniel Pearce*	474	13.2	+0.5
Conservative	Christine Williams	444	12.4	+1.9
Conservative	Cabdiraxmaan Aakhiro	440	12.2	−0.9
Green	Jean Robertson-Molloy	291	8.1	−1.3
Liberal Democrats	Joan Bushill	211	5.9	N/A
Duma Polska	Danuta Ksiazkiewicz-Tylka	84	2.3	N/A
Turnout		3,593	32.9	
Labour hold		Swing		
Labour hold		Swing		
Labour hold		Swing		

Pearce was a councillor for Southgate ward prior to the election.

=== Enfield Highway ===
Enfield Highway (3)
Party	Candidate	Votes	%	±%
Labour	Ergun Eren*	2,148	65.4	+9.4
Labour	Christine Hamilton*	2,003	61.0	+2.9
Labour	Ahmet Hasan*	1,889	57.6	+4.7
Conservative	Andrew Thorp	760	23.2	−0.9
Conservative	Nicholas Dines*	754	23.0	+0.5
Conservative	Leonard Munasinghe	718	21.9	+6.3
Independent	Erol Ovayolu	379	11.5	N/A
Green	Fatosh Sarica	271	8.3	−3.4
Liberal Democrats	John Macrory	152	4.6	N/A
Turnout		3,282	31.1	
Labour hold		Swing		
Labour hold		Swing		
Labour hold		Swing		

Eren was first elected as a councillor in a by election in December 2017.

Dines was a councillor for Chase ward prior to the election.

=== Enfield Lock ===
Enfield Lock (3)
Party	Candidate	Votes	%	±%
Labour	Birsen Demirel	2,308	64.8	+3.4
Labour	Guner Aydin	2,288	64.2	+7.7
Labour	Elif Erbil	2,217	62.2	+6.1
Conservative	Christine Bellas	847	23.8	+5.2
Conservative	Karen Frazer	792	22.2	+4.7
Conservative	Patrick Drysdale	766	21.5	+7.7
Green	David Flint	339	9.5	−1.9
Liberal Democrats	Richard Mapleston	194	5.4	N/A
UKIP	Gary Robbens	181	5.1	−16.1
Turnout		3,564	32.7	
Labour hold		Swing		
Labour hold		Swing		
Labour hold		Swing		

=== Grange ===
Grange (3)
Party	Candidate	Votes	%	±%
Conservative	Andy Milne*	2,627	58.9	+5.6
Conservative	Chris Dey	2,538	56.9	+8.6
Conservative	Terry Neville*	2,527	56.7	+6.7
Labour	Hazel Kinsler	1,352	30.3	+1.5
Labour	Vanessa Skarpari	1,185	26.6	+3.9
Labour	Rasheed Sadegh-Zadeh	1,159	26.0	+4.6
Liberal Democrats	Stuart Laycock	512	11.5	+4.1
Liberal Democrats	Neil Anderton	511	11.5	N/A
Liberal Democrats	Robert Wilson	458	10.3	N/A
Turnout		4,460	44.2	
Conservative hold		Swing		
Conservative hold		Swing		
Conservative hold		Swing		

=== Haselbury ===
Haselbury (3)
Party	Candidate	Votes	%	±%
Labour	Saray Karakus	2,311	68.4	+6.5
Labour	Mustafa Cetinkaya	2,268	67.1	+11.2
Labour	George Savva*	2,268	67.1	+8.6
Conservative	Matthew Harwood	619	18.3	−3.4
Conservative	Michael Lavender*	589	17.4	+0.7
Conservative	Jane Spring	532	15.7	+3.5
Green	Nicola Scott	324	9.6	−1.9
Liberal Democrats	Huw Dawson	208	6.2	N/A
Turnout		3,379	33.2	
Labour hold		Swing		
Labour hold		Swing		
Labour hold		Swing		

Lavender was a councillor for Cockfosters ward prior to the election.

=== Highlands ===
Highlands (3)
Party	Candidate	Votes	%	±%
Conservative	Glynis Vince*	2,579	57.6	+9.2
Conservative	Lee David-Sanders*	2,569	57.4	+7.2
Conservative	Joanne Laban*	2,529	56.5	+8.7
Labour	Patricia Ekechi*	1,261	28.2	−2.3
Labour	David South	1,243	27.8	−2.2
Labour	Mohammad Islam	1,060	23.7	+1.7
Green	Phil Cooper	694	15.5	−1.3
Liberal Democrats	Laura Woodland	436	9.7	N/A
UKIP	Jeff Evans	156	3.5	−17.4
Turnout		4,478	44.0	
Conservative hold		Swing		
Conservative hold		Swing		
Conservative hold		Swing		

Laban was a councillor for Town ward prior to the election.

Ekechi was a councillor for Upper Edmonton ward prior to the election.

=== Jubilee ===
Jubilee (3)
Party	Candidate	Votes	%	±%
Labour	Nesil Caliskan*	2,132	64.5	+8.9
Labour	Alev Cazimoglu*	2,132	64.5	+3.1
Labour	Bernie Lappage*	2,110	63.8	+6.9
Conservative	Glenn Breslin	772	23.4	+2.5
Conservative	Ratip Al Sulaimen	746	22.6	+5.3
Conservative	Eric Jukes*	712	21.5	+4.2
Green	Benjamin Gill	248	7.5	−1.1
UKIP	Constantine Baritz	164	5.0	−13.2
Liberal Democrats	Richard Morgan-Ash	160	4.8	N/A
Turnout		3,305	35.7	
Labour hold		Swing		
Labour hold		Swing		
Labour hold		Swing		

Caliskan was first elected as a councillor in a by election in May 2015.

Jukes was a councillor for Grange ward prior to the election.

=== Lower Edmonton ===
Lower Edmonton (3)
Party	Candidate	Votes	%	±%
Labour	Sinan Boztas	2,379	71.0	+2.6
Labour	Guney Dogan*	2,321	69.3	−3.3
Labour	Margaret Greer	2,305	68.8	+5.8
Conservative	Margaret Beard	669	20.0	+7.2
Conservative	Anne Bagulay	540	16.1	+3.6
Conservative	Ian Revis	479	14.3	+2.9
Democrats and Veterans	David Schofield	213	6.4	N/A
Liberal Democrats	Norman Whitby	186	5.6	N/A
Green	Peter Krakowiak	77	2.3	−10.2
Turnout		3,349	32.5	
Labour hold		Swing		
Labour hold		Swing		
Labour hold		Swing		

=== Palmers Green ===
Palmers Green (3)
Party	Candidate	Votes	%	±%
Labour	Timothy Leaver	2,440	60.9	+4.7
Labour	Mary Maguire*	2,431	60.7	+8.0
Labour	Ahmet Oykener*	2,144	53.5	+7.4
Conservative	Tolga Suleyman	1,073	26.8	+1.8
Conservative	Shyam Lennon	1,071	26.7	+2.5
Conservative	Baykal Suruk	908	22.7	+0.9
Green	Basil Clarke	651	16.2	±0.0
Liberal Democrats	Brendan Malone	430	10.7	+3.1
Turnout		4,007	37.1	
Labour hold		Swing		
Labour hold		Swing		
Labour hold		Swing		

=== Ponders End ===
Ayfer Orhan resigned from the Labour Party, sits in the Community First group and has joined the Liberal Democrats .

Ponders End (3)
Party	Candidate	Votes	%	±%
Labour	Susan Erbil	2,302	72.4	+7.0
Labour	Ayfer Orhan*	2,196	69.1	+3.6
Labour	Doug Taylor*	2,152	67.7	+2.2
Conservative	Chris Heathwood	542	17.0	+0.2
Conservative	Adele Panayi	475	14.9	−0.3
Conservative	Phivos Joannides	436	13.7	−1.0
Green	Seton During	259	8.1	−3.3
Independent	Mahamed Awale	214	6.7	N/A
Liberal Democrats	Helen Pridham	152	4.8	N/A
Turnout		3,180	33.7	
Labour hold		Swing		
Labour hold		Swing		
Labour hold		Swing		

=== Southbury ===
Southbury (3)
Party	Candidate	Votes	%	±%
Labour	Christopher Bond*	2,296	64.6	+8.1
Labour	Mahmut Aksanoglu	2,081	58.6	+9.3
Labour	Nneka Keazor*	2,030	57.1	+10.8
Conservative	Clive Parker	955	26.9	+4.3
Conservative	Garry Kousoulou	927	26.1	+5.0
Conservative	Salem Al-Damluji	757	21.3	+1.9
Green	Luke Balnave	456	12.8	+0.5
Liberal Democrats	Alan Stainer	283	8.0	N/A
Turnout		3,554	35.4	
Labour hold		Swing		
Labour hold		Swing		
Labour hold		Swing		

Keazor was a councillor for Enfield Lock ward prior to the election.

=== Southgate ===
Stephanos Ioannou was suspended from the Conservative Party in 2018, he has since been readmitted.

Charith Gunawardena and Derek Levy both resigned from the Labour Party, with Levy joining Community First and Gunawardena joining the Green Party.

Southgate (3)
Party	Candidate	Votes	%	±%
Labour	Charith Gunawardena	1,896	44.8	+4.1
Conservative	Stephanos Ioannou	1,809	42.7	−2.9
Labour	Derek Levy*	1,809	42.7	+4.7
Labour	Angie McEvoy	1,803	42.6	+7.5
Conservative	Jasmine Storry	1,727	40.8	−2.9
Conservative	Keith Ly	1,666	39.4	−2.6
Green	Geri Saccomanno	511	12.1	−4.9
Liberal Democrats	Leslie Dubow	434	10.3	−0.4
Liberal Democrats	Regine Lemberger	313	7.4	N/A
Turnout		4,232	47.3	
Labour gain from Conservative		Swing		
Conservative hold		Swing		
Labour gain from Conservative		Swing		

=== Southgate Green ===
Daniel Anderson and Anne Brown both resigned from the Labour Party and joined Community First. Anne Brown then joined the Green Party.

Southgate Green (3)
Party	Candidate	Votes	%	±%
Labour	Daniel Anderson*	2,118	48.0	+3.8
Labour	Claire Stewart*	2,018	45.8	+4.8
Labour	Anne Brown	1,977	44.8	+9.8
Conservative	Marina Savva	1,596	36.2	−3.7
Conservative	Helen Kacouris	1,573	35.7	+1.8
Conservative	Emma Bishop-Laggett	1,557	35.3	+4.6
Liberal Democrats	Chris Bushill	521	11.8	+3.7
Green	David Hughes	478	10.8	−0.7
Liberal Democrats	Diana Medlicott	446	10.1	N/A
Liberal Democrats	David Mitchell	439	10.0	N/A
Turnout		4,410	43.1	
Labour hold		Swing		
Labour hold		Swing		
Labour gain from Conservative		Swing		

=== Town ===
Town (3)
Party	Candidate	Votes	%	±%
Conservative	Lindsay Rawlings	2,606	49.5	+5.9
Conservative	Mike Rye*	2,580	49.0	+5.9
Conservative	Jim Steven*	2,384	45.3	+5.7
Labour	Ed Poole	1,947	37.0	+6.5
Labour	Doris Jiagge*	1,834	34.8	+5.1
Labour	Tahsin Ibrahim	1,801	34.2	+9.8
Green	Kay Heather	696	13.2	−1.7
Women's Equality	Tulip Hambleton	648	12.3	N/A
Liberal Democrats	Margaret Steel	423	8.0	N/A
UKIP	Deborah Cairns	183	3.5	−13.2
Turnout		5,265	46.7	
Conservative hold		Swing		
Conservative hold		Swing		
Conservative hold		Swing		

Jiagge was a councillor for Upper Edmonton ward prior to the election.

=== Turkey Street ===
Turkey Street (3)
Party	Candidate	Votes	%	±%
Labour	Rick Jewell	2,159	64.8	+11.5
Labour	Gina Needs	2,060	61.8	+11.5
Labour	Sabri Ozaydin	1,964	58.9	+10.9
Conservative	David Boston	920	27.6	+4.1
Conservative	Kyri Efthymiou	860	25.8	+4.5
Conservative	Raphae Lepe	792	23.8	+3.3
Green	Bill Linton	247	7.4	−3.1
Liberal Democrats	Tony Kidman	148	4.4	N/A
Turnout		3,334	34.4	
Labour hold		Swing		
Labour hold		Swing		
Labour hold		Swing		

=== Upper Edmonton ===
Upper Edmonton (3)
Party	Candidate	Votes	%	±%
Labour	Huseyin Akpinar	2,672	74.4	+3.3
Labour	Kate Anolue	2,669	74.3	+4.3
Labour	Mahtab Uddin	2,270	63.2	−2.5
Conservative	Chris Joannides	541	15.1	−0.4
Conservative	Andi Smith	495	13.8	−1.6
Conservative	Abdi Nageye	404	11.3	−3.9
Green	Caroline Macaulay	342	9.5	−5.6
Green	Alex McRae	248	6.9	N/A
Liberal Democrats	Karen Trotman	191	5.3	N/A
Turnout		3,592	32.4	
Labour hold		Swing		
Labour hold		Swing		
Labour hold		Swing		

=== Winchmore Hill ===
Dinah Barry resigned from the Labour Party and joined Community First. She is the leader of the Community First group on Enfield Council.

Winchmore Hill (3)
Party	Candidate	Votes	%	±%
Labour	Dinah Barry*	2,054	43.8	+9.9
Labour	Ian Barnes	1,963	41.8	+4.1
Conservative	Maria Alexandrou	1,956	41.7	+1.7
Conservative	Gonul Daniels	1,891	40.3	+1.2
Conservative	Paul Mandel	1,873	39.9	+7.1
Labour	Calvin Tucker	1,624	34.6	+10.2
Independent	Harry Redmond	549	11.7	N/A
Green	Alison Phillips	498	10.6	−4.8
Green	Lynne Davies	457	9.7	−5.2
Liberal Democrats	Matthew McLaren	431	9.2	+0.9
Liberal Democrats	Lorice Stainer	293	6.2	N/A
Turnout		4,691	46.7	
Labour gain from Conservative		Swing		
Labour gain from Conservative		Swing		
Conservative gain from Labour		Swing		

== By-elections ==
=== Chase ===
Chase: 6 May 2021
Party	Candidate	Votes	%	±%
Conservative	Andrew James Thorp	2,138	44.0	+10.4
Labour	Chris James	1,775	36.5	−2.3
Liberal Democrats	Guy Russo	517	10.6	−3.3
Green	Lynne Davies	374	7.7	−1.8
TUSC	Mira Glavardanov	58	1.2	N/A
Majority		363	7.5	
Turnout		4,862		
Conservative gain from Labour		Swing	▲6.4	

=== Jubilee ===
Jubilee: 6 May 2021
Party	Candidate	Votes	%	±%
Labour	Chinelo Anyanwu	2,170	55.7	−5.6
Conservative	Benny Neza	1,070	27.5	+5.3
Green	Bill Linton	321	8.2	+1.1
Liberal Democrats	Iman Saadoune	171	4.4	−0.2
Taking the Initiative	Clive Morrison	100	2.6	N/A
TUSC	Lewis Peacock	63	1.6	N/A
Majority		1,100	28.2	
Turnout		3,895		
Labour hold		Swing	▼5.5	

=== Southbury ===
Southbury: 6 May 2021
Party	Candidate	Votes	%	±%
Labour	Ayten Guzel	1,961	46.6	−10.9
Conservative	Patrick Drysdale	1,380	32.8	+8.9
Green	Luke Balnave	470	11.2	−0.2
Liberal Democrats	Luke Cummings	246	5.8	−1.3
TUSC	John Dolan	82	1.9	N/A
We Matter Party	Hughie Rose	37	0.9	N/A
Taking the Initiative	Jheni Morrison	36	0.9	N/A
Majority		581	13.8	
Turnout		4,212		
Labour hold		Swing	▼9.9	

=== Bush Hill Park ===
Bush Hill Park: 1 July 2021
Party	Candidate	Votes	%	±%
Conservative	Peter Fallart	1,694	55.2	
Labour	Nia Stevens	875	28.5	
Green	Benjamin Maydon	233	7.6	
Liberal Democrats	Ade Adetula	225	7.3	
TUSC	John Dolan	27	0.9	
Taking the Initiative	Clive Morrison	15	0.5	
Majority		819	26.7	
Turnout		3,069	29.0	
Conservative hold		Swing		
