= 1986 Enfield London Borough Council election =

1986 local election in England

The 1986 Enfield Council election took place on 8 May 1986 to elect members of Enfield London Borough Council in London, England. The whole council was up for election and the Conservative party stayed in overall control of the council.

== Election result ==
Party	Candidates	Councillors	Votes won	% votes
Conservative	66	38	81,444	47.4%
Labour	66	28	60,530	35.3%
Alliance	66	0	28,217	16.4%
Green	9	0	1,484	0.9%

== Ward results ==
Angel Road (2)
Party	Candidate	Votes	%	±%
Labour	John A. Connew	1,124	32.1%	
Labour	Sheila A. Camp	1,070	30.6%	
Conservative	Robert A. Cunningham	611	17.4%	
Conservative	Panayiota Georgiou	426	12.2%	
Alliance	David A. Osman	166	4.7%	
Alliance	Ivor Zeitman	105	3.0%	
Turnout		3,502		

Arnos (2)
Party	Candidate	Votes	%	±%
Labour	Allan W. Course	1,151	22.9%	
Labour Co-op	Josepha G. Scotney	1,021	20.3%	
Conservative	John P. Egan	944	18.8%	
Conservative	Cecil A. Newell	839	16.7%	
Alliance	Robert Fitzgerald	545	10.8%	
Alliance	Michael K. Lawson	534	10.6%	
Turnout		5,034		

Bowes (2)
Party	Candidate	Votes	%	±%
Labour	Jeffrey L. Rodin	1,268	24.2%	
Labour	Cedric D.R. Meynert	1,260	24.0%	
Conservative	John R. Bowyer	984	18.8%	
Conservative	John D. Reed	930	17.7%	
Alliance	Glenton J. Haddock	407	7.8%	
Alliance	John M. Benjamin	392	7.5%	
Turnout		5,241		

Bullsmoor (2)
Party	Candidate	Votes	%	±%
Conservative	Brian S. Tarrant	1,305	23.8%	
Conservative	Alan D. Dehnel	1,262	23.0%	
Labour	Sheila M. Grayston	1,251	22.8%	
Labour	Anthony Kinsler	1,127	20.5%	
Alliance	George Achillea	273	5.0%	
Alliance	Helen Osman	271	4.9%	
Turnout		5,489		

Chase (2)
Party	Candidate	Votes	%	±%
Conservative	Ian M. McCann	1,636	27.3%	
Conservative	Janice A. Gayler	1,602	26.7%	
Labour	James S. Horridge	833	13.9%	
Labour	Victoria Wells	788	13.1%	
Alliance	Sheila M. Macleod	503	8.4%	
Alliance	Winifred F. Wooster	392	6.5%	
Green	Robert Adams	247	4.1%	
Turnout		6,001		

Craig Park (2)
Party	Candidate	Votes	%	±%
Labour	Mark Fenton	1,284	36.5%	
Labour	Alexander W. Mattingly	1,086	30.9%	
Conservative	Nigel C. Schofield	414	11.8%	
Conservative	Kenneth F. Biggs	412	11.7%	
Alliance	Joan Heaney	163	4.6%	
Alliance	Patricia Lotz	159	4.5%	
Turnout		3,518		

Enfield Lock (2)
Party	Candidate	Votes	%	±%
Conservative	Grace M. Ford	1,407	23.7%	
Labour Co-op	Christopher J. Bond	1,320	22.2%	
Labour Co-op	Michael Malina	1,296	21.8%	
Conservative	Paul A. Watts	1,254	21.1%	
Alliance	Gwendolen M. Cann	340	5.7%	
Alliance	Eileen E. Robeson	327	5.5%	
Turnout		5,944		

Enfield Wash (2)
Party	Candidate	Votes	%	±%
Labour Co-op	Wilfred E. Davies	1,255	28.6%	
Labour Co-op	Joseph D. Nalty	1,047	23.9%	
Conservative	Walter L. Hasler	798	18.2%	
Conservative	Abdool Azeez	704	16.0%	
Alliance	Kenneth J. Keen	318	7.2%	
Alliance	Jean D. Kincaid	266	6.1%	
Turnout		4,388		

Grange (2)
Party	Candidate	Votes	%	±%
Conservative	John L. Lindsay	2,371	37.4%	
Conservative	Winifred A. Reardon	2,188	34.5%	
Alliance	Andrew J. Green	562	8.9%	
Alliance	Joy C. Wiggett	551	8.7%	
Labour	Ronald Daultry	362	5.7%	
Labour	Sidney F. Simmonds	302	4.8%	
Turnout		6,336		

Green Street (2)
Party	Candidate	Votes	%	±%
Conservative	William Price	1,284	23.5%	
Labour	Michael J. Parry	1,250	22.9%	
Conservative	Stephen M. Wortley	1,213	22.2%	
Labour	Douglas Taylor	1,150	21.1%	
Alliance	Alan C.J. Rogers	293	5.4%	
Alliance	Norman Pein	263	4.8%	
Turnout		5,453		

Grovelands (2)
Party	Candidate	Votes	%	±%
Conservative	John G. Payne	1,489	26.4%	
Conservative	Peter S. Matthew	1,440	25.5%	
Alliance	Douglas B.L. Gifford	938	16.6%	
Alliance	Eric D. Widger	903	16.0%	
Labour	Philip Rowe	385	6.8%	
Labour	Nigel J. Pallace	383	6.8%	
Green	Annette C. Barber	103	1.8%	
Turnout		5,641		

Highfield (2)
Party	Candidate	Votes	%	±%
Conservative	Peter M.A. Lovell	1,182	28.0%	
Conservative	Alan J. Young	1,076	25.5%	
Labour	Christopher V. Cole	719	17.1%	
Labour	Zena Lebow	615	14.6%	
Alliance	Paul H.W. Cockle	350	8.3%	
Alliance	Dinos Karris	275	6.5%	
Turnout		4,217		

Hoe Lane (2)
Party	Candidate	Votes	%	±%
Labour	Reginald Kendall	1,379	27.2%	
Labour	Martin P. Hughes	1,315	25.9%	
Conservative	Roadley T. Edwards	965	19.0%	
Conservative	Andrew D. Young	884	17.4%	
Alliance	George H. Hollis	269	5.3%	
Alliance	Sheila E.K. Walker	256	5.1%	
Turnout		5,068		

Huxley (2)
Party	Candidate	Votes	%	±%
Labour	Hugh P. Jarvis	1,323	24.4%	
Labour	George A. Savva	1,260	23.2%	
Conservative	David A. Godfrey	1,112	20.5%	
Conservative	Doreen Mardon	987	18.2%	
Alliance	Isobel M. Tricks	383	7.1%	
Alliance	Sylvia E. Walker	361	6.7%	
Turnout		5,426		

Jubilee (2)
Party	Candidate	Votes	%	±%
Labour	Kathleen L. Prowse	1,270	24.7%	
Labour	Ann R. Wilkinson	1,134	22.0%	
Conservative	Mark L. Dingley	1,022	19.8%	
Conservative	John F. James	908	17.6%	
Alliance	Colin J. Curley	419	8.1%	
Alliance	Leland M. Lewis	399	7.7%	
Turnout		5,152		

Latymer (2)
Party	Candidate	Votes	%	±%
Labour	Brian G. Grayston	1,290	32.4%	
Labour	Simon P. Caplan	1,283	32.3%	
Conservative	David C. Pritchard	535	13.4%	
Conservative	David A.J. Wise	483	12.1%	
Alliance	Graeme Johnston	200	5.0%	
Alliance	Brian Eaton	187	4.7%	
Turnout		3,978		

Merryhills (2)
Party	Candidate	Votes	%	±%
Conservative	Lionel I. Genn	1,736	33.9%	
Conservative	Anne R. Lindsay	1,679	32.8%	
Alliance	Doreen M. Lawson	464	9.1%	
Labour	Alfred Freedman	441	8.6%	
Alliance	Michael N. Rose	433	8.5%	
Labour	Basil Stein	367	7.2%	
Turnout		5,120		

Oakwood (2)
Party	Candidate	Votes	%	±%
Conservative	David A. Conway	1,243	24.0%	
Conservative	Patricia A. Dawson	1,164	22.5%	
Alliance	David J. Springnall	799	15.4%	
Alliance	Ian D. Swinton	715	13.8%	
Labour	Guy M. Collen	664	12.8%	
Labour	Andrew N. Gilbert	593	11.5%	
Turnout		5,178		

Palmers Green (2)
Party	Candidate	Votes	%	±%
Conservative	Alan T. Amos	1,291	24.9%	
Conservative	Joanna M. Curran	1,275	24.6%	
Labour	Maurice M. Glasman	841	16.2%	
Labour Co-op	Gladys E.M. Stanbridge	616	11.9%	
Alliance	Dominic J.S. Smith	456	8.8%	
Alliance	Andreas Polydorou	448	8.6%	
Green	Stephen Rooney	265	5.1%	
Turnout		5,192		

Ponders End (2)
Party	Candidate	Votes	%	±%
Labour Co-op	Winston F. Hamid	1,274	26.6%	
Labour Co-op	Mark E. Astarita	1,218	25.4%	
Conservative	Jacqueline A.V. Froggitt	831	17.3%	
Conservative	Raymond J. Hanlon	816	17.0%	
Alliance	Gladys V. Boswell-Jones	290	6.0%	
Alliance	Barbara Ogles	258	5.4%	
Green	Malcolm J. Tanner	109	2.3%	
Turnout		4.796		

Raglan (2)
Party	Candidate	Votes	%	±%
Conservative	Clive C. Goldwater	1,675	28.3%	
Conservative	Harry W. Corpe	1,652	27.9%	
Labour	Adrienne Davis	819	13.8%	
Labour	Terence M.P. O'Hehir	748	12.6%	
Alliance	Susan E. Chalstrey	464	7.8%	
Alliance	Ian J. Davis	464	7.8%	
Green	Kathryn L. Jarvis	97	1.6%	
Turnout		5,919		

St Alphege (2)
Party	Candidate	Votes	%	±%
Labour	Rita A. Smythe	1,176	27.5%	
Labour	Leonard V. Nicolls	1,140	26.6%	
Conservative	Raymond P. Brooks	745	17.4%	
Conservative	Kenneth J. Edwards	745	17.4%	
Alliance	Jean Kingsnorth	248	5.8%	
Alliance	Mary E.H. Medley	229	5.3%	
Turnout		4,283		

St Marks (2)
Party	Candidate	Votes	%	±%
Conservative	Jacqueline G. Harding	1,328	24.3%	
Conservative	Henry J. Mardon	1,247	22.8%	
Labour	Roger Buckley	1,020	18.7%	
Labour	Terence S. Simons	984	18.0%	
Alliance	Jean P. Digby	454	8.3%	
Alliance	Leonard Carton	429	7.9%	
Turnout		5,462		

St Peters (2)
Party	Candidate	Votes	%	±%
Labour	Eric J.C. Smythe	1,205	26.3%	
Labour	Michele A. Bull	1,142	25.0%	
Alliance	John Slowe	608	13.3%	
Conservative	Peter J. White	561	12.3%	
Alliance	Trevor R. Stone	552	12.1%	
Conservative	Angela J. Wood	508	11.1%	
Turnout		4,576		

Southbury (2)
Party	Candidate	Votes	%	±%
Conservative	Frank Nellis	1,406	24.8%	
Conservative	Richard C. Stacy	1,354	23.8%	
Labour	David R.C. Beadle	950	16.7%	
Labour	Susan J. Clarke	921	16.2%	
Alliance	Elisabeth J. Davies	539	9.5%	
Alliance	Margaret Lewis	510	9.0%	
Turnout		5,680		

Southgate Green (2)
Party	Candidate	Votes	%	±%
Conservative	Peter G. Elvidge	1,357	27.6%	
Conservative	Leonard J. Hobson	1,278	26.0%	
Labour	Norma D. Hacmmerle	531	10.8%	
Alliance	Anthony W. Cutcher	530	10.8%	
Labour	Morris Lebow	521	10.6%	
Alliance	Larice Stainer	514	10.5%	
Green	Peter N. Riddington	181	3.7%	
Turnout		4,912		

Town (2)
Party	Candidate	Votes	%	±%
Conservative	Roger D. Brooke	1,750	26.8%	
Conservative	John R. Boast	1,647	25.2%	
Alliance	Stephen P. Charge	1,028	15.7%	
Alliance	Ronald P. Hocking	994	15.2%	
Labour	Garry Hill	516	7.9%	
Labour	Paul A. Renny	507	7.8%	
Green	Penelope M. Stevenson	88	1.3%	
Turnout		6,530		

Trent (2)
Party	Candidate	Votes	%	±%
Conservative	Nadezda Conway	1,882	34.4%	
Conservative	Anne M.D. Pearce	1,873	34.2%	
Alliance	Audrey I.G. Chapman	598	10.9%	
Alliance	Catherine G. Edwards	560	10.2%	
Labour	Leslie A. Harris	287	5.2%	
Labour	Victor Martin	275	5.0%	
Turnout		5,475		

Village (2)
Party	Candidate	Votes	%	±%
Conservative	John W.E. Jackson	1,999	35.0%	
Conservative	John A. Wyatt	1,861	32.6%	
Labour	Patricia M. Mattingly	536	9.4%	
Labour	Richard F. Simmons	528	9.3%	
Alliance	Barbara G. Adams	406	7.1%	
Alliance	Geoffrey G.J. Penhallow	378	6.6%	
Turnout		5,708		

Weir Hall (2)
Party	Candidate	Votes	%	±%
Labour	Andreas Constantinides	1,166	24.0%	
Labour	Sian M. Walker	1,144	23.6%	
Conservative	Victor G. James	1,107	22.8%	
Conservative	Jean B. Creber	1,086	22.4%	
Alliance	Jacqueline A. Stone	177	3.6%	
Alliance	Laurna C.I. Barrows	174	3.6%	
Turnout		4,854		

Willow (2)
Party	Candidate	Votes	%	±%
Conservative	Graham G. Eustance	1,946	31.7%	
Conservative	Duncan Lewis	1,836	29.9%	
Labour	Patrick R. Horridge	710	11.6%	
Labour	Rolandos Chrysostomou	617	10.0%	
Alliance	Angus M. Macleod	540	8.8%	
Alliance	Frank H.C. Stockwell	494	8.0%	
Turnout		6,143		

Winchmore Hill (2)
Party	Candidate	Votes	%	±%
Conservative	Peter Perryman	1,459	29.5%	
Conservative	Terence F. Neville	1,427	28.9%	
Labour	Anthony Cleary	475	9.6%	
Alliance	Thomas C. Digby	473	9.6%	
Labour	Peter J. King	449	9.1%	
Alliance	Carrie J. Tasch	440	8.9%	
Green	Julie Jackson	215	4.4%	
Turnout		4,938		

Worcesters (2)
Party	Candidate	Votes	%	±%
Conservative	Andrew C. Nicholas	1,527	23.4%	
Conservative	James E. Porter	1,486	22.8%	
Labour	Edward D. Ellis	1,327	20.3%	
Labour	Vladimir C. Goddard	1,221	18.7%	
Alliance	Diana L. Stanley	407	6.2%	
Alliance	Thomas H. Yeo	374	5.7%	
Green	Linda A. Lawrence	179	2.7%	
Turnout		6,521		

== See also ==
- Enfield London Borough Council elections
