= 2006 Enfield London Borough Council election =

2006 local election in England

2006 Enfield Borough Council election
← 2002	4 May 2006	2010 →

All 63 seats to Enfield London Borough Council 32 seats needed for a majority
	First party	Second party	Third party
Party	Conservative	Labour	Save Chase Farm
Last election	39 seats, 49.9%	24 seats, 35.1%	n/a
Seats won	34	27	2
Seat change	▼5	▲3	▲2
Popular vote	34,067	24,733	12,470
Percentage	38.4%	27.9%	14.0%
Swing	▼11.5%	▼7.2%	▲14.0%
- Map of the results of the 2006 Enfield council election. Conservatives in blue and Labour in red and Save Chase Farm in blue.
Council control before election
Conservative
Council control after election
Conservative

The 2006 Enfield Council election took place on 4 May 2006 to elect members of Enfield London Borough Council in London, England. The whole council was up for election and the Conservative Party stayed in overall control of the council.

== Election result ==
The Conservatives maintained a majority of 5 on the council, after losing 6 seats but also gaining 1 seat, to have 34 councillors. Labour made a net gain of 3 seats to have 27 councillors, while the remaining 2 seats were won by the Save Chase Farm group. Save Chase Farm had been formed to oppose any plans to close accident and emergency services at Chase Farm Hospital and gained 1 seat in each of Chase and Town wards. Overall turnout at the election was 37.91%.

Enfield local election result 2006
Party	Seats	Gains	Losses	Net gain/loss	Seats %	Votes %	Votes	+/−
Conservative	34	1	6	-5	54.0	47.2	97,172	-5.0
Labour	27	4	1	+3	42.9	33.7	69,413	-3.0
Save Chase Farm	2	2	0	+2	3.2	6.1	12,470	+6.1
Liberal Democrats	0	0	0	0	0.0	7.9	16,232	-1.3
Green	0	0	0	0	0.0	3.8	7,834	+2.4
UKIP	0	0	0	0	0.0	1.1	2,355	+0.8
Independent	0	0	0	0	0.0	0.2	312	+0.1
Vivamus – Let Us Live	0	0	0	0	0.0	0.1	148	+0.1

== Ward results ==
Bowes (3)
Party	Candidate	Votes	%	±%
Labour	Yasemin Brett	1,280	39.4	
Labour	Achilleas Georgiou	1,180		
Labour	Jefrey Rodin	1,100		
Green	Laura Davenport	1,000	30.8	
Conservative	Adil Certel	966	29.8	
Conservative	David Marshall	948		
Conservative	Reuben Fevrier	873		
Green	William Linton	822		
Green	Peter Krakowiak	730		
Turnout		8,899	36.9	+8.2
Labour hold		Swing		
Labour hold		Swing		
Labour hold		Swing		

Bush Hill Park (3)
Party	Candidate	Votes	%	±%
Conservative	John Jackson	2,248	38.0	
Conservative	Jonas Hall	2,178		
Conservative	Elefterios Savva	1,827		
Save Chase Farm	Jennifer Blaskett	1,442	24.4	
Labour	Josephine Purcell	780	13.2	
Labour	Paul Sceeny	683		
Labour	Kyrian Eke	649		
Green	Nina Armstrong	604	10.2	
Liberal Democrats	Robert Clark	547	9.2	
Liberal Democrats	Michael Spinks	533		
UKIP	Gwyneth Rolph	298	5.0	
Turnout		11,789	42.2	+3.2
Conservative hold		Swing		
Conservative hold		Swing		
Conservative hold		Swing		

Chase (3)
Party	Candidate	Votes	%	±%
Conservative	Anthony Dey	1,935	39.3	
Conservative	Annette Dreblow	1,903		
Save Chase Farm	Catherine Wilkinson	1,727	35.1	
Conservative	Matthew Laban	1,619		
Labour	Michele Bull	856	17.4	
Labour	Christopher Deacon	808		
Labour	Tony Clare-Paule	677		
Liberal Democrats	Margaret Steel	407	8.3	
Liberal Democrats	Larice Stainer	328		
Liberal Democrats	Alan Stainer	296		
Turnout		10,556	42.6	+5.8
Conservative hold		Swing		
Conservative hold		Swing		
Save Chase Farm gain from Conservative		Swing		

Cockfosters (3)
Party	Candidate	Votes	%	±%
Conservative	Michael Lavender	2,488	59.7	
Conservative	Paul McCannah	2,474		
Conservative	Constantinos Antoniou	2,395		
Labour	Elizabeth Costello	687	16.5	
Labour	Andrew Finni	676		
Labour	Timothy Leaver	614		
Liberal Democrats	David Peters	536	12.9	
Green	Trevor Doughty	455	10.9	
Turnout		10,325	37.3	+3.4
Conservative hold		Swing		
Conservative hold		Swing		
Conservative hold		Swing		

Edmonton Green (3)
Party	Candidate	Votes	%	±%
Labour	Kristofor Brown	1,726	54.4	
Labour	Denise Headley	1,630		
Labour	Andrew Stafford	1,490		
Conservative	Mary Gosnell	685	21.6	
Conservative	Joseph Smith	665		
Conservative	Simon Maynard	602		
Green	Joseph Jones	389	12.3	
Liberal Democrats	Trevor Stone	374	11.8	
Turnout		7,556	33.2	+8.1
Labour hold		Swing		
Labour hold		Swing		
Labour hold		Swing		

Enfield Highway (3)
Party	Candidate	Votes	%	±%
Labour	Christopher Murphy	1,540	36.9	
Labour	Dino Lemonides	1,419		
Labour	Tobias Simon	1,406		
Conservative	Bill Price	1,250	30.0	
Conservative	Andrew Nicholas	1,093		
Conservative	James Steven	1,036		
Save Chase Farm	Richard Reeve	886	21.2	
UKIP	Madeline Jones	496	11.9	
Turnout		9,126	36.3	+6.6
Labour gain from Conservative		Swing		
Labour gain from Conservative		Swing		
Labour gain from Conservative		Swing		

Enfield Lock (3)
Party	Candidate	Votes	%	±%
Conservative	Norman Ford	1,318	30.3	
Conservative	Ruth Hones	1,162		
Labour	Derek Goddard	1,143	26.3	
Conservative	Penelope Heathwood	1,125		
Labour	Ivor Wiggett	991		
Labour	Thambiah Ganesanayakam	936		
Save Chase Farm	Sujal Zaveri	893	20.5	
Liberal Democrats	Georgian Clark-Mazo	507	11.7	
UKIP	Gary Robbens	485	11.2	
Turnout		8,560	33.4	+1.8
Conservative hold		Swing		
Conservative hold		Swing		
Labour gain from Conservative		Swing		

Grange (3)
Party	Candidate	Votes	%	±%
Conservative	Terence Neville	2,517	44.3	
Conservative	Glynis Vince	2,350		
Conservative	Chris Joannides	2,304		
Save Chase Farm	Stephen Armstrong	1,385	24.4	
Labour	Hazel Kinsler	563	9.9	
Labour	Edward Cowling	510		
Labour	Raymond Cartwright	489		
Liberal Democrats	Helen Osman	483	8.5	
Green	Theresa Stibbe	462	8.1	
Liberal Democrats	Paul Smith	385		
UKIP	David Jeal	270	4.8	
Turnout		11,718	44.0	+1.0
Conservative hold		Swing		
Conservative hold		Swing		
Conservative hold		Swing		

Haselbury (3)
Party	Candidate	Votes	%	±%
Labour	Jayne Buckland	1,509	43.9	
Labour	George Savva	1,463		
Labour	Donald McGowan	1,448		
Conservative	Sakine Ates	1,027	30.8	
Conservative	Beyzade Beyzade	1,011		
Conservative	Roger Vince	1,005		
Green	Jack Johnson	450	13.5	
Liberal Democrats	Hanne Strange	395	11.8	
Turnout		8,308	33.7	+6.1
Labour hold		Swing		
Labour hold		Swing		
Labour hold		Swing		

Highlands (3)
Party	Candidate	Votes	%	±%
Conservative	Jonathan Kaye	2,736	47.3	
Conservative	Anne Pearce	2,475		
Conservative	Dogan Delman	2,469		
Save Chase Farm	Jeremy Southgate	1,595	27.6	
Liberal Democrats	Vivien Dalling	777	13.4	
Labour	Adam Leadbetter	671	11.6	
Labour	Vanessa Rhiney	581		
Labour	Ataur Rahman	556		
Turnout		11,860	45.0	+3.6
Conservative hold		Swing		
Conservative hold		Swing		
Conservative hold		Swing		

Jubilee (3)
Party	Candidate	Votes	%	±%
Labour	Ahmet Hasan	1,543	43.5	
Conservative	Christopher Andrew	1,539	43.4	
Labour	Bernadette Lappage	1,521		
Conservative	Sarah McDonald	1,431		
Labour	Anthony Nicholaspillai	1,427		
Conservative	Kamuran Kadir	1,281		
Green	Jean Robertson-Molloy	468	13.2	
Turnout		9,210	39.7	+7.4
Labour hold		Swing		
Conservative hold		Swing		
Labour hold		Swing		

Lower Edmonton (3)
Party	Candidate	Votes	%	±%
Labour	Vivien Giladi	1,550	51.3	
Labour	Ahmet Oykener	1,493		
Labour	Geoffrey Robinson	1,487		
Conservative	Amos Charles	978	32.3	
Conservative	Alper Kurtaran	849		
Conservative	David Schofield	848		
Liberal Democrats	Robin Lambie	496	16.4	
Liberal Democrats	Dervish Mertcan	454		
Liberal Democrats	Margot Wilson	445		
Turnout		8,600	33.2	+4.4
Labour hold		Swing		
Labour hold		Swing		
Labour hold		Swing		

Palmers Green (3)
Party	Candidate	Votes	%	±%
Labour	Charalambos Charalambous	1,572	38.1	
Conservative	Henry Pipe	1,456	35.2	
Labour	Christopher Cole	1,403		
Conservative	Shamit Shukla	1,380		
Labour	Ingrid Cranfield	1,323		
Conservative	Jill Skalla	1,289		
Green	Nicola Scott	509	12.3	
Liberal Democrats	Brendan Malone	446	10.8	
Liberal Democrats	Frances Carman	391		
Liberal Democrats	Thomas Kibasi	322		
Independent	Andrikos Malakounides	148	3.6	
Turnout		10,275	39.0	+3.7
Labour hold		Swing		
Conservative gain from Labour		Swing		
Labour hold		Swing		

Ponders End (3)
Party	Candidate	Votes	%	±%
Labour	Chaudhury Anwar	1,583	55.0	
Labour	Douglas Taylor	1,528		
Labour	Ayfer Orhan	1,504		
Conservative	Robert Livermore	882	30.6	
Conservative	Angela Jukes	864		
Conservative	Gillian Shadbolt	823		
Liberal Democrats	Joy Wiggett	414	14.4	
Turnout		7,598	30.8	+5.5
Labour hold		Swing		
Labour hold		Swing		
Labour hold		Swing		

Southbury (3)
Party	Candidate	Votes	%	±%
Labour	Christopher Bond	1,415	30.0	
Conservative	Peter Fallart	1,304	27.6	
Conservative	Lee Chamberlain	1,295		
Labour	Alev Cazimoglu	1,276		
Labour	Derek Levy	1,273		
Conservative	Phillip Dawson	1,213		
Save Chase Farm	Robin Somerville	894	18.9	
Green	Nicholas Stone	406	8.6	
Liberal Democrats	Bruno Hickman	348	7.4	
UKIP	Frederick Rolph	228	4.8	
UKIP	Brian Hall	202		
UKIP	Roy Freshwater	196		
Independent	Stanley Carter	128	2.7	
Turnout		10,178	40.0	+8.1
Labour hold		Swing		
Conservative hold		Swing		
Conservative hold		Swing		

Southgate (3)
Party	Candidate	Votes	%	±%
Conservative	Edward Smith	1,760	53.3	
Conservative	Robert Hayward	1,751		
Conservative	Terence Smith	1,692		
Liberal Democrats	Joanna Lamb	848	25.7	
Liberal Democrats	Brian Cronk	776		
Liberal Democrats	Anthony Kila	739		
Labour	James Asser	696	21.1	
Labour	Sally Webber	648		
Labour	Hakki Tilki	615		
Turnout		9,525	35.3	+0.0
Conservative hold		Swing		
Conservative hold		Swing		
Conservative hold		Swing		

Southgate Green (3)
Party	Candidate	Votes	%	±%
Conservative	Alan Barker	1,935	44.7	
Conservative	Henry Lamprecht	1,851		
Conservative	Ann Zinkin	1,809		
Labour	Michael Piachaud	1,239	28.6	
Labour	Hyacinth Sandilands	1,152		
Labour	Alan Sitkin	1,138		
Liberal Democrats	David Hughes	561	13.0	
Green	Frederick Clark	539	12.5	
Liberal Democrats	Michael Trup	507		
Liberal Democrats	Alan Zierler	425		
Vivamus – Let Us Live	Bernard Toolan	54	1.2	
Vivamus – Let Us Live	Judith Toolan	48		
Vivamus – Let Us Live	Rebecca Toolan	46		
Turnout		11,304	40.7	+3.2
Conservative hold		Swing		
Conservative hold		Swing		
Conservative hold		Swing		

Town (3)
Party	Candidate	Votes	%	±%
Conservative	Michael Rye	2,481	37.3	
Conservative	Eric Jukes	2,464		
Save Chase Farm	Kieran McGregor	2,460	37.0	
Conservative	Joanne Laban	2,216		
Labour	Caitriona Bearryman	911	13.7	
Labour	Martin Hegarty	853		
Liberal Democrats	Fiona Macleod	803	12.1	
Liberal Democrats	John Krahn	750		
Labour	Barry Schwartz	573		
Turnout		13,511	45.9	+3.7
Conservative hold		Swing		
Conservative hold		Swing		
Save Chase Farm gain from Conservative		Swing		

Turkey Street (3)
Party	Candidate	Votes	%	±%
Conservative	Margaret Holt	1,546	40.3	
Conservative	John Boast	1,437		
Conservative	Pamela Adams	1,431		
Save Chase Farm	Ben Hall	1,188	31.0	
Labour	Robert Johnson	1,100	28.7	
Labour	Bernadette Togher	907		
Labour	Aisha Alrai	818		
Turnout		8,427	35.9	+1.9
Conservative hold		Swing		
Conservative hold		Swing		
Conservative hold		Swing		

Upper Edmonton (3)
Party	Candidate	Votes	%	±%
Labour	Andreas Constantinides	1,496	45.5	
Labour	Catherine Anolue	1,495		
Labour	Christiana During	1,409		
Conservative	Joy Elias	929	28.3	
Conservative	Metin Noyan	856		
Conservative	Melake Fessehazion	778		
Liberal Democrats	Jacqueline Stone	451	13.7	
Green	Geoffrey Kemball-Cook	410	12.5	
Turnout		7,824	31.7	+5.7
Labour hold		Swing		
Labour hold		Swing		
Labour hold		Swing		

Winchmore Hill (3)
Party	Candidate	Votes	%	±%
Conservative	Elaine Hayward	2,087	48.1	
Conservative	Ertan Hurer	2,022		
Conservative	Martin Prescott	2,011		
Labour	Sarah Doyle	919	21.2	
Labour	Daniel Ashley	778		
Labour	Euan Wilmshurst	707		
Green	Christopher Driel	595	13.7	
Liberal Democrats	Michael Steel	557	12.8	
Liberal Democrats	Androulla Morphakis	524		
Liberal Democrats	Ivor Zietman	407		
UKIP	John Lyon	180	4.1	
Turnout		10,787	39.3	+5.6
Conservative hold		Swing		
Conservative hold		Swing		
Conservative hold		Swing		
