= 2010 Enfield London Borough Council election =

2010 local election in England

2010 Enfield Borough Council election
- 6 May 2010

All 63 seats to Enfield London Borough Council 35 seats needed for a majority
	First party	Second party
Party	Labour	Conservative
Last election	27 seats, 27.9%	34 seats, 38.4%
Seats before	27	34
Seats won	36	27
Seat change	▲9	▼5
Popular vote	54,007	53,432
Percentage	34.7%	34.3%
Swing	▲6.8%	▼4.1%
- Map of the results of the 2010 Enfield council election. Conservatives in blue and Labour in red.
Council control before election
Conservative
Council control after election
Labour

The 2010 Enfield Council election took place on 6 May 2010 to elect members of Enfield London Borough Council in London, England. The whole council was up for election and the Labour Party gained overall control of the council from the Conservative Party.

== Background ==
The last election in 2006 had the Conservatives hold a majority with 34 seats, compared to 27 for Labour and 2 from the Save Chase Farm group. Between 2006 and 2010 Labour gained a seat from the Conservatives in February 2009 at a by-election in Jubilee ward, but a Labour councillor Denise Headley defected to the Conservatives in August 2009.

11 councillors stood down at the election, 7 Conservatives and 4 Labour, including the leader of the Labour group Jeff Rodin. Parties standing at the election, included the Green Party who stood in every ward for the first time, the UK Independence Party who had 5 candidates and the British National Party who had 4.

== Election result ==
Labour gained control with 36 seats after winning all 3 seats in 12 wards, while the Conservatives won 27 seats in 9 wards. Labour dominated the east of the borough, while the Conservatives held the seats in the west. Wards where Labour gained from the Conservatives included Enfield Lock, Palmers Green, Southbury and Turkey Street, but the Conservatives gained 2 seats from Save Chase Farm councillors.

Following the election Doug Taylor became the new Labour leader of the council, after being elected unopposed as the leader of the Labour group.

Enfield local election result 2010
Party	Seats	Gains	Losses	Net gain/loss	Seats %	Votes %	Votes	+/−
Labour	36	9	0	+9	57.1	42.7	152,873	+9.0
Conservative	27	2	9	-7	42.9	42.2	151,068	-5.0
Liberal Democrats	0	0	0	0	0.0	8.3	29,687	+0.4
Green	0	0	0	0	0.0	4.5	16,131	+0.7
UKIP	0	0	0	0	0.0	0.9	3,246	-0.2
Save Chase Farm	0	0	2	-2	0.0	0.8	2,973	-5.3
BNP	0	0	0	0	0.0	0.5	1,733	+0.5

== Ward results ==
Bowes (3)
Party	Candidate	Votes	%	±%
Labour	Yasemin Brett	2,400	44.5	
Labour	Achilleas Georgiou	2,283	42.3	
Labour	Alan Sitkin	1,834	34.0	
Conservative	Adil Certel	1,489	27.6	
Conservative	Howard Leithead	1,327	24.6	
Conservative	Mehmet Imamzade	1,277	23.7	
Green	Laura Davenport	968	17.9	
Liberal Democrats	Sarah Dodgson	945	17.5	
Liberal Democrats	Rosemary Edmonds	805	14.9	
Liberal Democrats	Leslie Dubow	664	12.3	
Green	Jack Johnson	629	11.7	
Green	Peter Krakowiak	537	9.9	
Turnout		5,398	60.4	+23.5
Labour hold		Swing		
Labour hold		Swing		
Labour hold		Swing		

Bush Hill Park (3)
Party	Candidate	Votes	%	±%
Conservative	Jonas Hall	3,451	48.0	
Conservative	Denise Headley	3,225	44.8	
Conservative	Eleftherios Savva	3,224	44.8	
Labour	Grace Loake	2,230	31.0	
Labour	Paul Sceeny	2,077	28.9	
Labour	Ivor Wigget	2,049	28.5	
Liberal Democrats	George Achillea	1,747	24.3	
Green	Douglas Coker	942	13.1	
UKIP	Gwyneth Rolph	618	8.6	
Turnout		7,192	69.6	+27.4
Conservative hold		Swing		
Conservative hold		Swing		
Conservative hold		Swing		

Chase (3)
Party	Candidate	Votes	%	±%
Conservative	Simon Maynard	2,892	45.3	
Conservative	Marcus East	2,604	40.8	
Conservative	Tom Waterhouse	2,526	39.6	
Labour	Jo Hamilton	1,925	30.2	
Labour	Vicki Pite	1,756	27.5	
Labour	Terence McManus	1,696	26.6	
Save Chase Farm	Kate Wilkinson	1,282	20.1	
Liberal Democrats	Lorice Stainer	1,215	19.0	
Green	Jim Osborne	775	12.2	
UKIP	Roy Freshwater	559	8.8	
Turnout		6,378	67.0	+24.4
Conservative hold		Swing		
Conservative hold		Swing		
Conservative gain from Save Chase Farm		Swing		

Cockfosters (3)
Party	Candidate	Votes	%	±%
Conservative	Paul McCannah	4,032	59.0	
Conservative	Michael Lavender	4,016	58.8	
Conservative	Lionel Zetter	3,319	48.6	
Labour	Brian Barford	1,599	23.4	
Labour	Ewan Flynn	1,564	22.9	
Labour	Timothy Leaver	1,476	21.6	
Liberal Democrats	David Peters	1,364	20.0	
Green	Joe Phillips	704	10.3	
Turnout		6,831	65.5	+28.2
Conservative hold		Swing		
Conservative hold		Swing		
Conservative hold		Swing		

Edmonton Green (3)
Party	Candidate	Votes	%	±%
Labour	Jayne Buckland	3,442	60.3	
Labour	Chris Murphy	3,337	58.5	
Labour	Andrew Stafford	2,971	52.0	
Conservative	Lauren Bennett	1,476	25.9	
Conservative	Ibrahim Issaq	1,191	20.9	
Conservative	Karruna-Thewi Ratnarajan	1,074	18.8	
Liberal Democrats	Simeon Alamezie	1,016	17.8	
Green	Alon Prytherch	490	8.6	
Turnout		5,708	57.9	+24.7
Labour hold		Swing		
Labour gain from Conservative		Swing		
Labour hold		Swing		

Enfield Highway (3)
Party	Candidate	Votes	%	±%
Labour	Toby Simon	3,003	49.5	
Labour	Alev Cazimoglu	2,876	47.4	
Labour	Dino Lemonides	2,850	47.0	
Conservative	Bill Price	2,038	33.6	
Conservative	Lindsay Rawlings	1,705	28.1	
Conservative	Richard Reynolds	1,690	27.9	
Liberal Democrats	Frances Carman	842	13.9	
UKIP	Madge Jones	537	8.9	
BNP	Marie Nicholas	450	7.4	
Green	Theresa Stibbe	437	7.2	
Turnout		6,067	59.8	+23.5
Labour hold		Swing		
Labour hold		Swing		
Labour hold		Swing		

Enfield Lock (3)
Party	Candidate	Votes	%	±%
Labour	Christine Hamilton	3,073	49.8	
Labour	Nneka Keazor	2,794	45.3	
Labour	Ozzie Uzoanya	2,665	43.2	
Conservative	Ruth Hones	1,939	31.4	
Conservative	Penny Heathwood	1,859	30.1	
Conservative	Lee Sanders	1,754	28.4	
Liberal Democrats	Hannie Strange	934	15.1	
Green	David Flint	577	9.3	
UKIP	Gary Robbens	540	8.7	
BNP	Steve Squire	477	7.7	
Turnout		6,174	61.4	+28.0
Labour gain from Conservative		Swing		
Labour gain from Conservative		Swing		
Labour hold		Swing		

Grange (3)
Party	Candidate	Votes	%	±%
Conservative	Terence Neville	4,070	57.7	
Conservative	Chris Joaniddes	4,022	57.0	
Conservative	Glynis Vince	3,874	55.0	
Labour	Edward Jones	1,716	24.3	
Labour	Hazel Kinsler	1,566	22.2	
Labour	Stephen Butters	1,521	21.6	
Liberal Democrats	Enrique Boo	1,327	18.8	
Green	Gabrielle Lobb	871	12.4	
Turnout		7,050	72.0	+28.0
Conservative hold		Swing		
Conservative hold		Swing		
Conservative hold		Swing		

Haselbury (3)
Party	Candidate	Votes	%	±%
Labour	George Savva	3,106	54.7	
Labour	Ali Bakir	2,988	52.6	
Labour	Patricia Ekechi	2,902	51.1	
Conservative	Paul Edwards	1,717	30.2	
Conservative	Nilifer Erbil	1,440	25.4	
Conservative	David Schofield	1,393	24.5	
Liberal Democrats	Stephen Savva	1,040	18.3	
Green	Liz Wright	552	9.7	
Turnout		5,678	61.2	+27.5
Labour hold		Swing		
Labour hold		Swing		
Labour hold		Swing		

Highlands (3)
Party	Candidate	Votes	%	±%
Conservative	Jon Kaye	4,073	58.1	
Conservative	Don Delman	4,019	57.3	
Conservative	Anne-Marie Pearce	3,773	53.8	
Labour	Rebecca Davies	1,901	27.1	
Labour	Martin Hegarty	1,609	23.0	
Liberal Democrats	Vivien Dalling	1,478	21.1	
Labour	Vincent Sutherland	1,316	18.8	
Green	Andreea Malin	790	11.3	
Turnout		7,010	70.3	+25.3
Conservative hold		Swing		
Conservative hold		Swing		
Conservative hold		Swing		

Jubilee (3)
Party	Candidate	Votes	%	±%
Labour	Ahmet Hasan	2,870	50.3	
Labour	Christopher Deacon	2,862	50.2	
Labour	Rohini Simbodyal	2,682	47.0	
Conservative	Jason George	1,943	34.1	
Conservative	Ersin Celebi	1,942	34.0	
Conservative	Hasan Hurer	1,728	30.3	
Liberal Democrats	Ramis Cizer	807	14.1	
Green	Geoffrey Kemball-Cook	458	8.0	
Turnout		5,704	62.1	+22.4
Labour hold		Swing		
Labour hold		Swing		
Labour hold		Swing		

Lower Edmonton (3)
Party	Candidate	Votes	%	±%
Labour	Ingrid Cranfield	3,401	57.8	
Labour	Geoff Robinson	3,261	55.4	
Labour	Ahmet Oykener	3,234	54.9	
Conservative	Ken Hinds	1,682	28.6	
Conservative	Alper Kurtaran	1,309	22.2	
Conservative	Gulseren Sahin	1,253	21.3	
Liberal Democrats	Graham Beech	1,079	18.3	
Green	Joe Jones	621	10.5	
Turnout		5,889	61.0	+27.8
Labour hold		Swing		
Labour hold		Swing		
Labour hold		Swing		

Palmers Green (3)
Party	Candidate	Votes	%	±%
Labour	Bambos Charalambous	3,351	52.5	
Labour	Chris Cole	2,950	46.2	
Labour	Del Goddard	2,419	37.9	
Conservative	Kieron Farrelly	2,154	33.7	
Conservative	Henry Pipe	2,146	33.6	
Conservative	Marina Savva	2,002	31.4	
Liberal Democrats	Brendan Malone	1,294	20.3	
Green	Nicholas Wall	723	11.3	
BNP	Angelos Gavriel	233	3.6	
Turnout		6,384	64.8	+25.8
Labour hold		Swing		
Labour gain from Conservative		Swing		
Labour hold		Swing		

Ponders End (3)
Party	Candidate	Votes	%	±%
Labour	Chaudhury Anwar	3,119	56.7	
Labour	Doug Taylor	3,049	55.4	
Labour	Ayfer Orhan	2,934	53.3	
Conservative	Pamela Adams	1,507	27.4	
Conservative	Michael Antoniou	1,417	25.7	
Conservative	Mustafa Uluhan	1,314	23.9	
Liberal Democrats	Joy Wiggett	898	16.3	
Green	Rod Goodyer	522	9.5	
Turnout		5,504	59.1	+28.3
Labour hold		Swing		
Labour hold		Swing		
Labour hold		Swing		

Southbury (3)
Party	Candidate	Votes	%	±%
Labour	Christopher Bond	2,782	46.1	
Labour	Caitriona Bearryman	2,604	43.2	
Labour	Derek Levy	2,446	40.6	
Conservative	Lee Chamberlain	2,366	39.2	
Conservative	Peter Fallart	2,197	36.4	
Conservative	Adele Panayi	1,881	31.2	
Liberal Democrats	Stelios Morphakis	1,039	17.2	
Green	Chris Van Driel	604	10.0	
UKIP	Fred Rolph	506	8.4	
Turnout		6,032	64.3	+24.3
Labour hold		Swing		
Labour gain from Conservative		Swing		
Labour gain from Conservative		Swing		

Southgate (3)
Party	Candidate	Votes	%	±%
Conservative	Robert Hayward	2,914	44.7	
Conservative	Daniel Pearce	2,795	42.9	
Conservative	Edward Smith	2,626	40.3	
Liberal Democrats	Dawn Barnes	1,820	27.9	
Labour	Mervyn Maggs	1,777	27.3	
Labour	Ed Cowling	1,674	25.7	
Labour	Daniel Sitkin	1,485	22.8	
Liberal Democrats	Dervish Mertcan	1,426	21.9	
Liberal Democrats	Paul Smith	1,298	19.9	
Green	Geri Saccomanno	536	8.2	
Turnout		6,516	65.3	+30.0
Conservative hold		Swing		
Conservative hold		Swing		
Conservative hold		Swing		

Southgate Green (3)
Party	Candidate	Votes	%	±%
Conservative	Alan Barker	2,840	43.5	
Conservative	Henry Lamprecht	2,709	41.5	
Conservative	Ann Zinkin	2,630	40.3	
Labour	Betty Costello	2,442	37.4	
Labour	Sarah Doyle	2,406	36.8	
Labour	Ben Maloney	2,025	31.0	
Liberal Democrats	Alan Stainer	1,638	25.1	
Green	Fred Clark	1,177	18.0	
Turnout		6,534	65.9	+25.2
Conservative hold		Swing		
Conservative hold		Swing		
Conservative hold		Swing		

Town (3)
Party	Candidate	Votes	%	±%
Conservative	Michael Rye	3,903	48.9	
Conservative	Eric Jukes	3,834	48.0	
Conservative	Joanne Laban	3,702	46.3	
Labour	Ian Hamilton	2,098	26.3	
Labour	Laurane Morris	2,069	25.9	
Save Chase Farm	Kieran McGregor	1,691	21.2	
Liberal Democrats	Terry McGee	1,685	21.1	
Labour	Jeffrey Till	1,658	20.8	
Green	Tony Clapp	1,157	14.5	
Turnout		7,989	73.1	+27.2
Conservative hold		Swing		
Conservative hold		Swing		
Conservative gain from Save Chase Farm		Swing		

Turkey Street (3)
Party	Candidate	Votes	%	±%
Labour	Yusuf Cicek	2,303	41.2	
Labour	Donald McGown	2,299	41.1	
Labour	Tashin Ibrahim	2,267	40.5	
Conservative	Matthew Laban	2,210	39.5	
Conservative	Jim Steven	2,151	38.5	
Conservative	Bektas Yavuz	1,755	31.4	
Liberal Democrats	Matthew Mattioli	751	13.4	
BNP	Tony Avery	573	10.2	
UKIP	David Jeal	486	8.7	
Green	Bill Linton	466	8.3	
Turnout		5,593	61.5	+25.6
Labour gain from Conservative		Swing		
Labour gain from Conservative		Swing		
Labour gain from Conservative		Swing		

Upper Edmonton (3)
Party	Candidate	Votes	%	±%
Labour	Andreas Constantinides	3,345	57.6	
Labour	Kate Anolue	3,310	57.0	
Labour	Christiana During	3,233	55.7	
Conservative	Jacqueline Campbell	1,574	27.1	
Conservative	Ibrahim Hassan	1,516	26.1	
Conservative	Melake Fessehazion	1,286	22.1	
Liberal Democrats	Androulla Morphakis	826	14.2	
Green	Maddy Loftin	446	7.7	
Turnout		5,808	60.0	+28.3
Labour hold		Swing		
Labour hold		Swing		
Labour hold		Swing		

Winchmore Hill (3)
Party	Candidate	Votes	%	±%
Conservative	Elaine Hayward	3,162	46.9	
Conservative	Martin Prescott	3,103	46.0	
Conservative	Ertan Hurer	3,028	44.9	
Labour	Tony Cleary	2,124	31.5	
Labour	Claire Stewart	2,012	29.8	
Labour	Surinder Attariwala	1,857	27.5	
Liberal Democrats	Brian Cronk	1,749	25.9	
Green	Jean Robertson-Molloy	1,149	17.0	
Turnout		6,742	70.1	+30.8
Conservative hold		Swing		
Conservative hold		Swing		
Conservative hold		Swing		
