= 2002 Enfield London Borough Council election =

2002 local election in England

2002 Enfield Borough Council election
← 1998	2 May 2002	2006 →

All 63 seats to Enfield London Borough Council 35 seats needed for a majority
	First party	Second party
Party	Conservative	Labour
Last election	23	43
Seats won	39	24
Seat change	▲16	▼19
Popular vote	34,578	24,733
Percentage	49.9%	27.9%
- Map of the results of the 2002 Enfield council election. Conservatives in blue and Labour in red.
Council control before election
Labour
Council control after election
Conservative

The 2002 Enfield Council election took place on 2 May 2002 to elect members of Enfield London Borough Council in London, England. The whole council was up for election with boundary changes since the last election in 1998 reducing the number of seats by 3. The Conservative Party gained overall control of the council from the Labour Party.

== Election result ==
Enfield local election result 2002
Party	Seats	Gains	Losses	Net gain/loss	Seats %	Votes %	Votes	+/−
Conservative	39			+16	61.9	52.2	99,459	
Labour	24			-17	38.1	36.7	69,895	
Liberal Democrats	0			0	0.0	9.2	17,544	
Green	0			0	0.0	1.4	2,716	
UKIP	0			0	0.0	0.3	626	
Independent	0			-2	0.0	0.1	190	
Socialist Alliance	0			0	0.0	0.0	95	
CPA	0			0	0.0	0.0	77	

== Ward results ==
Bowes (3)
Party	Candidate	Votes	%	±%
Labour	Yasemin Brett	1,398		
Labour	Jeffrey Rodin	1,315		
Labour	Achilleas Georgiou	1,282		
Conservative	Steven Bolton	679		
Conservative	Felicity Brown	653		
Conservative	Bettina Yousefzadeh	538		
Green	Laura Davenport	304		
Liberal Democrats	Leslie Staines	304		
Green	Katharine Doughty	233		
Green	Richard Steer	232		
UKIP	Brian Hall	70		
UKIP	Roy Freshwater	62		
Turnout		7,070	28.7	

Bush Hill Park (3)
Party	Candidate	Votes	%	±%
Conservative	John Jackson	2,400		
Conservative	John Wyatt	2,276		
Conservative	Eleftherious Savva	2,272		
Labour	Neil Hargreaves	974		
Labour	Oluyemisi Erinoso	867		
Labour	Tiddy Perera	830		
Liberal Democrats	Michael Spinks	565		
Liberal Democrats	Joy Wiggett	433		
Liberal Democrats	Jacqueline Stone	421		
UKIP	Frederick Rolph	181		
UKIP	Gwyneth Rolph	144		
Turnout		11,363	39.0	

Chase (3)
Party	Candidate	Votes	%	±%
Conservative	Anthony Dey	2,162		
Conservative	Matthew Laban	2,084		
Conservative	Alasdair Macphail	2,016		
Labour	Caitriona Bearryman	879		
Labour	Ian Hamilton	823		
Labour	Ann Worth	813		
Liberal Democrats	Angus Macleod	533		
Turnout		9,310	36.8	

Cockfosters (3)
Party	Candidate	Votes	%	±%
Conservative	Michael Lavender	2,293		
Conservative	Constantinos Antoniou	2,203		
Conservative	Paul McCannah	2,186		
Labour	Andrew Finni	749		
Labour	Timothy Leaver	722		
Labour	Sian Walker-McAllister	658		
Liberal Democrats	Hanne Strange	390		
Liberal Democrats	Androulla Morphakis	356		
Liberal Democrats	Iqbal Qayyum	306		
Turnout		9,863	33.9	

Edmonton Green (3)
Party	Candidate	Votes	%	±%
Labour	Denise Headley	1,352		
Labour	Andrew Stafford	1,182		
Labour	Alexander Mattingly	1,177		
Conservative	Celia Gooch	590		
Conservative	Amos Charles	579		
Conservative	Joseph Smith	538		
Liberal Democrats	Doreen Dankyi	376		
Liberal Democrats	Trevor Stone	343		
Liberal Democrats	Constantia Kangellaris	290		
Socialist Alliance	Howard Medwell	95		
Turnout		6,522	25.1	

Enfield Highway (3)
Party	Candidate	Votes	%	±%
Conservative	Bill Price	1,459		
Conservative	James Steven	1,397		
Conservative	Andrew Nicholas	1,396		
Labour	Roger Buckley	1,300		
Labour	Brian Grayston	1,223		
Labour	Ayfer Orhan	1,199		
Turnout		7,974	29.7	

Enfield Lock (3)
Party	Candidate	Votes	%	±%
Conservative	Norman Ford	1,555		
Conservative	Penelope Heathwood	1,446		
Conservative	Jonas Hall	1,385		
Labour	Bernadette Lappage	1,256		
Labour	Terence McManus	1,204		
Labour	Lynette Romain	1,200		
Turnout		8,046	31.6	

Grange (3)
Party	Candidate	Votes	%	±%
Conservative	Paul Ingham	2,730		
Conservative	Terence Neville	2,726		
Conservative	Glynis Vince	2,726		
Labour	Hazel Kinster	738		
Labour	Julian Ellerby	705		
Labour	Raman Tailor	644		
Liberal Democrats	Helen Osman	525		
Liberal Democrats	Elizabeth Hicks	504		
Liberal Democrats	Michael Steel	444		
UKIP	Stephen Hoye	89		
UKIP	David Jeal	80		
Turnout		11,911	43.0	

Haselbury (3)
Party	Candidate	Votes	%	±%
Labour	Derek Goddard	1,369		
Labour	George Savva	1,319		
Labour	Ola Salako	1,290		
Conservative	Shamsuddin Chowdhury	864		
Conservative	Christine Williams	839		
Conservative	Mary Gosnell	829		
Liberal Democrats	Stuart McGowan	283		
Liberal Democrats	Margaret Steel	279		
Liberal Democrats	Ivor Zietman	208		
Turnout		7,280	27.6	

Highlands (3)
Party	Candidate	Votes	%	±%
Conservative	John Yates	2,686		
Conservative	Dogan Delman	2,650		
Conservative	Annemarie Pearce	2,643		
Labour	Stephen Londesborough	708		
Labour	Jansev Jemal	676		
Labour	Stephen Mann	664		
Liberal Democrats	Terence McGee	490		
Liberal Democrats	David Osman	412		
Liberal Democrats	Ekaterini Constantinidis	396		
Green	Henry Mister	265		
Turnout		11,590	41.4	

Jubilee (3)
Party	Candidate	Votes	%	±%
Labour	Jayne Buckland	1,421		
Labour	Ahmet Hasan	1,401		
Conservative	Christopher Andrew	1,383		
Labour	Christopher Murphy	1,380		
Conservative	Peter White	1,313		
Conservative	Yunus Kemal	1,292		
Turnout		8,190	32.3	

Lower Edmonton (3)
Party	Candidate	Votes	%	±%
Labour	Gerard McAllister	1,150		
Labour	Vivien Giladi	1,117		
Labour	Hyacinth Sandilands	1,065		
Conservative	Shirley Osborn	876		
Conservative	Victor James	863		
Conservative	Pepi Polycarpou	765		
Liberal Democrats	Yashar Ismailoglu	383		
Liberal Democrats	Clive Morrison	347		
Green	Nina Armstrong	265		
Independent	Eric Smythe	190		
Turnout		7,021	28.8	

Palmers Green (3)
Party	Candidate	Votes	%	±%
Labour	Charalambos Charalambous	1,559		
Labour	Joanne McCartney	1,479		
Labour	Christopher Cole	1,448		
Conservative	Erdogan Dervish	1,291		
Conservative	Chris Joannides	1,271		
Conservative	Raymond Page	1,223		
Liberal Democrats	Ian Swinton	357		
Liberal Democrats	Brendan Malone	351		
Liberal Democrats	Kevin Gilbride	339		
Green	William Linton	302		
Turnout		9,620	35.3	

Ponders End (3)
Party	Candidate	Votes	%	±%
Labour	Christiana During	1,185		
Labour	Christopher Bond	1,182		
Labour	Douglas Taylor	1,155		
Conservative	Douglas Green	783		
Conservative	Peter Perryman	759		
Conservative	Gillian Shadbolt	735		
Liberal Democrats	Patricia Belton	338		
Liberal Democrats	Alan Stainer	248		
Liberal Democrats	Lorice Stainer	230		
Turnout		6,615	25.3	

Southbury (3)
Party	Candidate	Votes	%	±%
Conservative	Peter Fallart	1,343		
Conservative	Lee Chamberlain	1,327		
Labour	Irene Richards	1,266		
Labour	Christine Hamilton	1,243		
Conservative	Metin Noyan	1,234		
Labour	George Watts	1,082		
Liberal Democrats	Jean Digby	482		
Turnout		7,977	31.9	

Southgate (3)
Party	Candidate	Votes	%	±%
Conservative	Robert Hayward	1,610		
Conservative	Edward Smith	1,596		
Conservative	Terence Smith	1,524		
Labour	Ivor Wiggett	882		
Labour	Theo Savva	848		
Labour	Mark Walton	831		
Liberal Democrats	David Peters	766		
Liberal Democrats	Margaret Marchant	756		
Liberal Democrats	David Rebak	691		
Turnout		9,504	35.3	

Southgate Green (3)
Party	Candidate	Votes	%	±%
Conservative	Alan Barker	1,703		
Conservative	David Schofield	1,660		
Conservative	Ann Zinkin	1,655		
Labour	Paul Simpson	1,478		
Labour	Surinder Attariwala	1,443		
Labour	Tahsin Ibrahim	1,368		
Liberal Democrats	Michael Trup	686		
Green	Frederick Clark	404		
Green	Trevor Doughty	320		
CPA	Bernard Toolan	77		
Turnout		10,794	37.5	

Town (3)
Party	Candidate	Votes	%	±%
Conservative	John Egan	2,759		
Conservative	Graham Eustance	2,728		
Conservative	Michael Rye	2,666		
Liberal Democrats	Christopher Jephcott	877		
Labour	Wendy Hall	846		
Labour	Alison Shepherd	834		
Liberal Democrats	Fiona Macleod	831		
Labour	Martin Hegarty	795		
Liberal Democrats	Robin Dubow	759		
Turnout		13,095	42.2	

Turkey Street (3)
Party	Candidate	Votes	%	±%
Conservative	Pamela Adams	1,790		
Conservative	Eric Jukes	1,772		
Conservative	John Boast	1,729		
Labour	Tobias Simon	1,119		
Labour	Gioacchino Avanzato	1,115		
Labour	Andrew Pakes	1,072		
Turnout		8,597	34.0	

Upper Edmonton (3)
Party	Candidate	Votes	%	±%
Labour	Catherine Anolue	1,402		
Labour	Andreas Constantinides	1,362		
Labour	Elizabeth Costello	1,319		
Conservative	Anne Wright	920		
Conservative	Kamuran Kadir	917		
Conservative	Roger Vince	916		
Turnout		6,836	26.0	

Winchmore Hill (3)
Party	Candidate	Votes	%	±%
Conservative	David Burrowes	2,174		
Conservative	Martin Prescott	2,051		
Conservative	Ertan Hurer	2,031		
Labour	Ingrid Cranfield	1,263		
Labour	Costantinos Lemonides	1,180		
Labour	Ahmet Oykener	1,089		
Liberal Democrats	John Wright	422		
Liberal Democrats	Lisa Dubow	414		
Liberal Democrats	Surendra Deo	409		
Green	Elain Graham-Leigh	391		
Turnout		11,424	33.7	
