= 1964 Enfield London Borough Council election =

The 1964 Enfield Council election took place on 7 May 1964 to elect members of Enfield London Borough Council in London, England. The whole council was up for election and the Labour Party gained overall control of the council.

== Background ==
These elections were the first to the newly formed borough. Previously elections had taken place in the Municipal Borough of Edmonton, Municipal Borough of Enfield and Municipal Borough of Southgate. These boroughs were joined to form the new London Borough of Enfield by the London Government Act 1963.

A total of 189 candidates stood in the election for the 60 seats being contested across 30 wards. These included a full slate from the Conservative and Labour parties, while the Liberals stood 52 candidates. Other candidates included 14 Independents, 2 Residents and 1 Communist. All wards were two-seat wards.

This election had aldermen as well as directly elected councillors. Labour got all 10 aldermen.

The Council was elected in 1964 as a "shadow authority" but did not start operations until 1 April 1965.

== Election result ==
The results saw Labour gain the new council with a majority of 2 after winning 31 of the 60 seats. Overall turnout in the election was 41.4%. This turnout included 976 postal votes.

== Ward results ==
Angel Road (2)
| Party | Candidate | Votes | % | ±% |
|---|---|---|---|---|
| Labour | Miss K. Harvey | 1,298 | | |
| Labour | C. G. Lacey | 1,277 | | |
| Conservative | A. E. Hanson | 352 | | |
| Conservative | Mrs. G. B. Hughes | 344 | | |
| Liberal | J. Boutell | 81 | | |
| Liberal | E. Ottery | 75 | | |
| Communist | R. Leeson | 41 | | |
| Turnout | | 1,765 | 31.1 | |
| Labour win (new seat) | | | | |
| Labour win (new seat) | | | | |

Arnos (2)
| Party | Candidate | Votes | % | ±% |
|---|---|---|---|---|
| Conservative | Mrs. A. L. Emsden | 1,235 | | |
| Labour | A. D. Veitch | 1,224 | | |
| Labour | W. C. Chapman | 1,223 | | |
| Conservative | D. H. Palmer | 1,215 | | |
| Independent | C. W. Thompson | 577 | | |
| Independent | H. A. Farbey | 573 | | |
| Liberal | Miss E. A. Joslin | 294 | | |
| Liberal | R. W. F. Saunders | 275 | | |
| Turnout | | 3,338 | 47.2 | |
| Conservative win (new seat) | | | | |
| Labour win (new seat) | | | | |

Bowes (2)
| Party | Candidate | Votes | % | ±% |
|---|---|---|---|---|
| Conservative | J. R. Bowyer | 1,183 | | |
| Conservative | P. G. Elvidge | 1,140 | | |
| Labour | G. W. Beckett | 725 | | |
| Labour | A. Freedman | 721 | | |
| Independent | L. F. Lafitte | 433 | | |
| Independent | R. P. Hazel | 428 | | |
| Liberal | N. Lawrence | 323 | | |
| Liberal | E. D. Staunton | 318 | | |
| Turnout | | 2,673 | 40.0 | |
| Conservative win (new seat) | | | | |
| Conservative win (new seat) | | | | |

Bullsmoor (2)
| Party | Candidate | Votes | % | ±% |
|---|---|---|---|---|
| Labour | D. E. Covill | 1,272 | | |
| Labour | J. A. Pepper | 1,235 | | |
| Conservative | A. D. Bates | 872 | | |
| Conservative | D. H. Nash | 828 | | |
| Liberal | S. G. Hills | 422 | | |
| Liberal | J. S. Hurd | 392 | | |
| Turnout | | 2,578 | 40.6 | |
| Labour win (new seat) | | | | |
| Labour win (new seat) | | | | |

Bush Hill (2)
| Party | Candidate | Votes | % | ±% |
|---|---|---|---|---|
| Labour | A. P. Daynes | 1,554 | | |
| Labour | B. G. Grayston | 1,523 | | |
| Conservative | J. A. Englefield | 865 | | |
| Conservative | Mrs. F. Wollard | 862 | | |
| Liberal | B. M. Brockwell | 376 | | |
| Liberal | J. C. Davis | 371 | | |
| Turnout | | 2,859 | 43.3 | |
| Labour win (new seat) | | | | |
| Labour win (new seat) | | | | |

Bush Hill South (2)
| Party | Candidate | Votes | % | ±% |
|---|---|---|---|---|
| Conservative | J. Boast | 1,370 | | |
| Conservative | E. C. Francis | 1,354 | | |
| Labour | S. Chapman | 683 | | |
| Labour | A. E. Kerr | 655 | | |
| Liberal | A. Fraser | 449 | | |
| Liberal | F. Skinner | 444 | | |
| Turnout | | 2,503 | 41.8 | |
| Conservative win (new seat) | | | | |
| Conservative win (new seat) | | | | |

Cambridge Road (2)
| Party | Candidate | Votes | % | ±% |
|---|---|---|---|---|
| Labour | E. T. Hendrick | 1,404 | | |
| Labour | P. A. Thomas | 1,354 | | |
| Conservative | J. T. Danson | 638 | | |
| Conservative | V. E. Avril | 634 | | |
| Liberal | A. E. Kemp | 508 | | |
| Liberal | R. A. Fitter | 484 | | |
| Turnout | | 2,681 | 44.2 | |
| Labour win (new seat) | | | | |
| Labour win (new seat) | | | | |

Chase (2)
| Party | Candidate | Votes | % | ±% |
|---|---|---|---|---|
| Conservative | W. H. Cook | 1,357 | | |
| Conservative | R. H. Leach | 1,288 | | |
| Labour | E. L. Mackenzie | 1,019 | | |
| Labour | Mrs. G. M. Jay | 976 | | |
| Liberal | E. J. O’Connor | 832 | | |
| Liberal | A. R. Garner | 781 | | |
| Turnout | | 3,212 | 55.8 | |
| Conservative win (new seat) | | | | |
| Conservative win (new seat) | | | | |

Church Street (2)
| Party | Candidate | Votes | % | ±% |
|---|---|---|---|---|
| Conservative | E. G. McNern | 1,761 | | |
| Conservative | E. S. Taylor | 1,740 | | |
| Labour | J. E. Lightfoot | 1,174 | | |
| Labour | M. Simpson | 1,139 | | |
| Liberal | R. Hull | 171 | | |
| Liberal | H. Holsgrove | 170 | | |
| Turnout | | 3,115 | 43.3 | |
| Conservative win (new seat) | | | | |
| Conservative win (new seat) | | | | |

Cockfosters (2)
| Party | Candidate | Votes | % | ±% |
|---|---|---|---|---|
| Conservative | S. Bercow | 1,655 | | |
| Conservative | Mrs. G. Y. Agran | 1,648 | | |
| Independent | S. R. Chase | 1,343 | | |
| Independent | F. A. Rule | 1,284 | | |
| Labour | R. H. Poole | 288 | | |
| Labour | Mrs. A. M. Lennox | 283 | | |
| Liberal | R. F. Wickens | 257 | | |
| Liberal | R. J. Salsbury | 250 | | |
| Turnout | | 3,576 | 54.9 | |
| Conservative win (new seat) | | | | |
| Conservative win (new seat) | | | | |

Craig Park (2)
| Party | Candidate | Votes | % | ±% |
|---|---|---|---|---|
| Labour | A. J. Tanner | 1,736 | | |
| Labour | R. Daultry | 1,725 | | |
| Conservative | Mrs. M. Gill | 234 | | |
| Conservative | F. Hoy | 234 | | |
| Turnout | | 1,999 | 31.6 | |
| Labour win (new seat) | | | | |
| Labour win (new seat) | | | | |

Enfield Wash (2)
| Party | Candidate | Votes | % | ±% |
|---|---|---|---|---|
| Labour | L. C. Merrion | 1,541 | | |
| Labour | C. Brown | 1,516 | | |
| Conservative | W. J. Stiles | 361 | | |
| Conservative | E. A. Williams | 335 | | |
| Liberal | C. J. Thompson | 259 | | |
| Liberal | P. F. Saunders | 258 | | |
| Turnout | | 2,141 | 35.4 | |
| Labour win (new seat) | | | | |
| Labour win (new seat) | | | | |

Grange (2)
| Party | Candidate | Votes | % | ±% |
|---|---|---|---|---|
| Conservative | Mrs. F. E. Watson | 2,256 | | |
| Conservative | A. J. Young | 2,223 | | |
| Liberal | J. P. J. Ellis | 432 | | |
| Liberal | Mrs. V. C. Ellis | 413 | | |
| Labour | D. Davis | 309 | | |
| Labour | J. L. T. Davies | 309 | | |
| Turnout | | 3,020 | 47.4 | |
| Conservative win (new seat) | | | | |
| Conservative win (new seat) | | | | |

Green Street (2)
| Party | Candidate | Votes | % | ±% |
|---|---|---|---|---|
| Labour | E. T. Graham | 1,386 | | |
| Labour | H. E. Latty | 1,351 | | |
| Conservative | C. R. Worboys | 579 | | |
| Conservative | Mrs. G. E. Fallows | 539 | | |
| Liberal | Mrs. E. G. Oxley | 282 | | |
| Liberal | A. C. Brittain | 248 | | |
| Turnout | | 2,272 | 34.3 | |
| Labour win (new seat) | | | | |
| Labour win (new seat) | | | | |

Highfield (2)
| Party | Candidate | Votes | % | ±% |
|---|---|---|---|---|
| Conservative | R. Prior | 1,414 | | |
| Conservative | W. Robinson | 1,412 | | |
| Labour | H. S. Newman | 604 | | |
| Labour | I. C. Seifert | 588 | | |
| Independent | Mrs. E. M. Proctor | 348 | | |
| Independent | J. G. Cox | 326 | | |
| Liberal | F. G. Hill | 326 | | |
| Liberal | G. A. Felton | 323 | | |
| Turnout | | 2,706 | 44.4 | |
| Conservative win (new seat) | | | | |
| Conservative win (new seat) | | | | |

Jubilee (2)
| Party | Candidate | Votes | % | ±% |
|---|---|---|---|---|
| Labour | K. Vaughan | 1,377 | | |
| Labour | L. Warren | 1,352 | | |
| Conservative | H. W. Corpe | 661 | | |
| Conservative | D. Smith | 652 | | |
| Residents | F. Maffia | 432 | | |
| Residents | E. Jones | 419 | | |
| Liberal | A. Cole | 112 | | |
| Liberal | F. Challener | 103 | | |
| Turnout | | 2,595 | 41.0 | |
| Labour win (new seat) | | | | |
| Labour win (new seat) | | | | |

New Park (2)
| Party | Candidate | Votes | % | ±% |
|---|---|---|---|---|
| Labour | Miss P. L. Hawkins | 1,237 | | |
| Labour | G. Taylor | 1,236 | | |
| Conservative | Mrs. E. Hoy | 1,082 | | |
| Conservative | J. A. Wyatt | 1,074 | | |
| Liberal | L. Cochrane | 232 | | |
| Liberal | L. Moore | 231 | | |
| Turnout | | 2,576 | 40.1 | |
| Labour win (new seat) | | | | |
| Labour win (new seat) | | | | |

Oakwood (2)
| Party | Candidate | Votes | % | ±% |
|---|---|---|---|---|
| Conservative | L. I. Genn | 1,776 | | |
| Conservative | G. H. Taylor | 1,774 | | |
| Independent | Mrs. M. M. Hobbs | 461 | | |
| Independent | S. J. Jones | 444 | | |
| Labour | A. D. Luke | 343 | | |
| Labour | Mrs. R. Freedman | 341 | | |
| Liberal | Mrs. E. D. Moss | 284 | | |
| Liberal | A. H. Lambley | 278 | | |
| Turnout | | 2,899 | 46.5 | |
| Conservative win (new seat) | | | | |
| Conservative win (new seat) | | | | |

Ordnance (2)
| Party | Candidate | Votes | % | ±% |
|---|---|---|---|---|
| Labour | F. B. Varney | 1,304 | | |
| Labour | V. H. Clements | 1,287 | | |
| Conservative | J. W. Wells | 658 | | |
| Conservative | E. H. Harvey | 655 | | |
| Liberal | E. W. Brown | 183 | | |
| Liberal | Mrs. S. A. Thomson | 177 | | |
| Turnout | | 2,174 | 31.2 | |
| Labour win (new seat) | | | | |
| Labour win (new seat) | | | | |

Palmers Green (2)
| Party | Candidate | Votes | % | ±% |
|---|---|---|---|---|
| Conservative | Mrs. S. G. Child | 1,470 | | |
| Conservative | J. Clarricoats | 1,458 | | |
| Independent | R. S. J. Davis | 644 | | |
| Independent | G. Fox | 629 | | |
| Labour | G. G. Goodman | 456 | | |
| Labour | A. C. Baker | 444 | | |
| Liberal | G. D. Perkins | 346 | | |
| Liberal | Miss B. Crowe | 282 | | |
| Turnout | | 2,838 | 38.0 | |
| Conservative win (new seat) | | | | |
| Conservative win (new seat) | | | | |

Ponders End (2)
| Party | Candidate | Votes | % | ±% |
|---|---|---|---|---|
| Labour | A. H. Chambers | 1,335 | | |
| Labour | E. J. Reyment | 1,287 | | |
| Conservative | H. Bones | 519 | | |
| Conservative | Mrs. P. Swannell | 506 | | |
| Liberal | W. J. R. Turner | 450 | | |
| Liberal | L. G. Ogles | 444 | | |
| Turnout | | 2,383 | 37.7 | |
| Labour win (new seat) | | | | |
| Labour win (new seat) | | | | |

Pymmes (2)
| Party | Candidate | Votes | % | ±% |
|---|---|---|---|---|
| Labour | T. Joyce | 1,954 | | |
| Labour | E. J. C. Smythe | 1,935 | | |
| Conservative | Mrs. M. Green | 459 | | |
| Conservative | K. Williams | 450 | | |
| Turnout | | 2,426 | 37.9 | |
| Labour win (new seat) | | | | |
| Labour win (new seat) | | | | |

St Alphege (2)
| Party | Candidate | Votes | % | ±% |
|---|---|---|---|---|
| Labour | J. Cooke | 1,433 | | |
| Labour | Mrs. R. A. Smythe | 1,405 | | |
| Conservative | J. Jackson | 476 | | |
| Conservative | E. Shea | 469 | | |
| Turnout | | 1,916 | 31.8 | |
| Labour win (new seat) | | | | |
| Labour win (new seat) | | | | |

St Peter's (2)
| Party | Candidate | Votes | % | ±% |
|---|---|---|---|---|
| Labour | K. V. Balding | 1,449 | | |
| Labour | C. E. Wright | 1,447 | | |
| Conservative | F. Hambleton | 314 | | |
| Conservative | W. Green | 307 | | |
| Turnout | | 1,787 | 29.1 | |
| Labour win (new seat) | | | | |
| Labour win (new seat) | | | | |

Silver Street (2)
| Party | Candidate | Votes | % | ±% |
|---|---|---|---|---|
| Labour | J. A. G. Beattie | 1,343 | | |
| Labour | M. Kahn | 1,337 | | |
| Conservative | Mrs. A. Beecroft | 896 | | |
| Conservative | E. Johnson | 878 | | |
| Liberal | Mrs. Jeanne Coberman | 140 | | |
| Liberal | Miss B. Nunn | 140 | | |
| Turnout | | 1,129 | 18.2 | |
| Labour win (new seat) | | | | |
| Labour win (new seat) | | | | |

Southgate Green (2)
| Party | Candidate | Votes | % | ±% |
|---|---|---|---|---|
| Conservative | F. S. Furneaux | 2,069 | | |
| Conservative | A. J. Hayes | 2,015 | | |
| Independent | Mrs. R. W. Fox | 761 | | |
| Independent | W. A. G. MacGregor | 713 | | |
| Liberal | Mrs. G. I. M. Greenaway | 300 | | |
| Liberal | A. I. Stainer | 295 | | |
| Labour | Mrs. R. Triesman | 260 | | |
| Labour | D. B. Herbert | 253 | | |
| Turnout | | 3,376 | 49.0 | |
| Conservative win (new seat) | | | | |
| Conservative win (new seat) | | | | |

Town (2)
| Party | Candidate | Votes | % | ±% |
|---|---|---|---|---|
| Conservative | E. P. Lomer | 1,292 | | |
| Conservative | Mrs. P. E. Joel | 1,272 | | |
| Labour | Mrs. B. Richenberg | 757 | | |
| Labour | R. L. Dubow | 752 | | |
| Liberal | Mrs. E. B. Pearce | 690 | | |
| Liberal | H. E. Stanley | 674 | | |
| Turnout | | 2,775 | 45.8 | |
| Conservative win (new seat) | | | | |
| Conservative win (new seat) | | | | |

West (2)
| Party | Candidate | Votes | % | ±% |
|---|---|---|---|---|
| Conservative | W. J. Watson | 2,132 | | |
| Conservative | Mrs. R. E. Jones | 2,126 | | |
| Labour | J. J. Cusack | 388 | | |
| Labour | F. C. Cunneen | 382 | | |
| Liberal | D. M. Gilbert | 350 | | |
| Liberal | Mrs. S. Griffith | 335 | | |
| Turnout | | 2,886 | 43.4 | |
| Conservative win (new seat) | | | | |
| Conservative win (new seat) | | | | |

Willow (2)
| Party | Candidate | Votes | % | ±% |
|---|---|---|---|---|
| Conservative | E. J. Prickett | 1,572 | | |
| Conservative | G. G. Eustance | 1,554 | | |
| Liberal | A. M. Macleod | 925 | | |
| Labour | A. J. Cooper | 897 | | |
| Labour | T. F. Millman | 885 | | |
| Liberal | L. J. Smith | 879 | | |
| Turnout | | 3,414 | 49.9 | |
| Conservative win (new seat) | | | | |
| Conservative win (new seat) | | | | |

Winchmore Hill (2)
| Party | Candidate | Votes | % | ±% |
|---|---|---|---|---|
| Conservative | J. L. Lindsay | 2,136 | | |
| Conservative | W. A. A. Poole | 2,122 | | |
| Liberal | K. J. Barnes | 399 | | |
| Liberal | D. F. Falkins | 398 | | |
| Labour | S. Galin | 319 | | |
| Labour | R. Harley | 313 | | |
| Turnout | | 2,880 | 45.2 | |
| Conservative win (new seat) | | | | |
| Conservative win (new seat) | | | | |
