= Chase Farm Hospital =

- Royal Free London NHS Foundation Trust
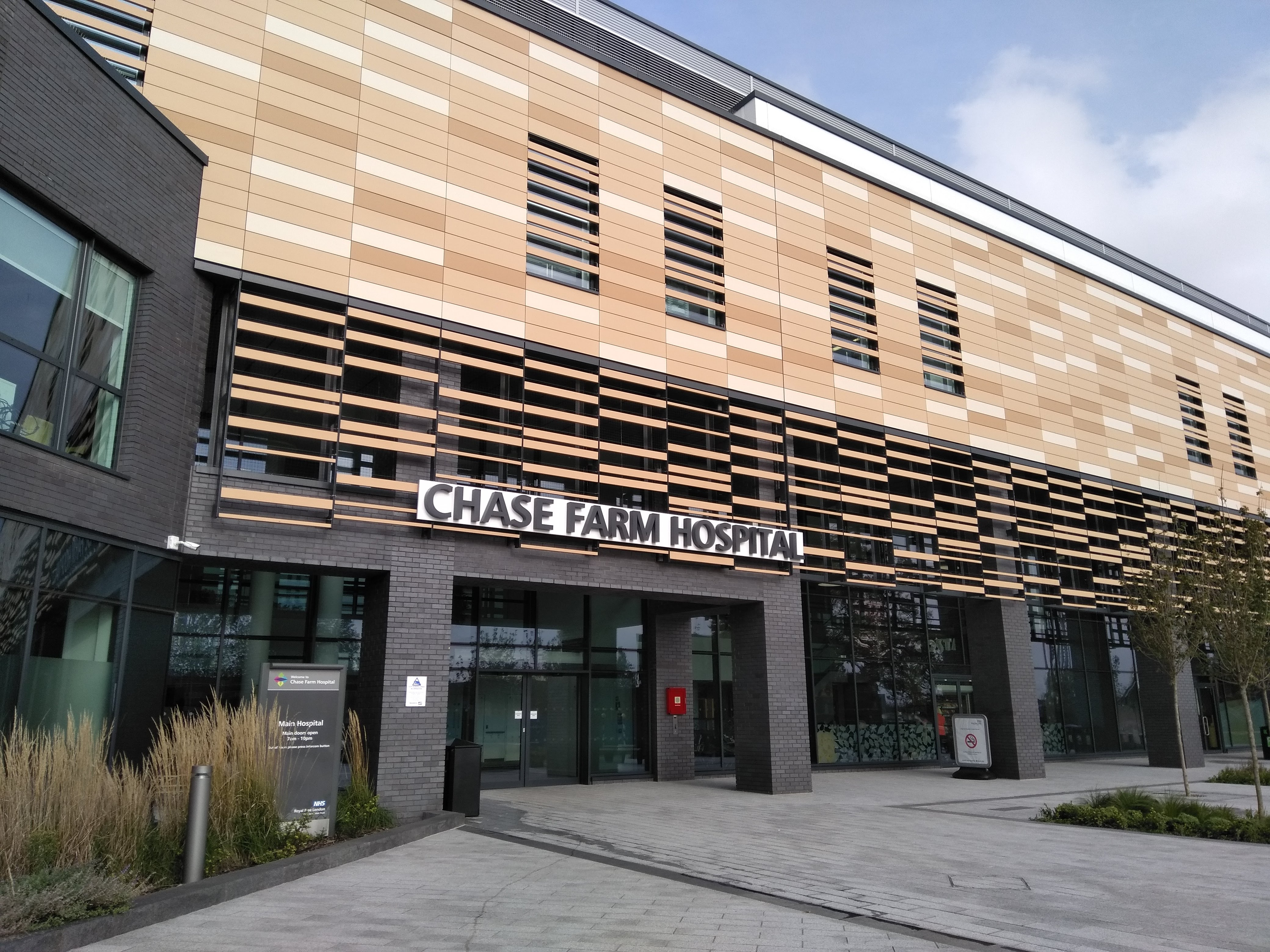
- The new main building of Chase Farm Hospital, first opened in 2018

- Location within Enfield

Geography
- Location: 127 The Ridgeway, Gordon Hill EN2 8JL, London, England
- Coordinates: 51.6669°N 0.1029°W

Organisation
- Care system: National Health Service
- Type: General

Services
- Emergency department: No
- Beds: 509

History
- Founded: c. 1948

Links
- Website: www.royalfree.nhs.uk/chase-farm-hospital/
- Lists: Hospitals in England

Chase Farm Hospital is a hospital on The Ridgeway, in Gordon Hill, Enfield, run by the Royal Free London NHS Foundation Trust.

== History ==
The hospital has its origins in a Poor Law orphanage established in 1886. The oldest part of the hospital, the "clock tower" building, was formerly the main part of the orphanage. Middlesex County Council started to admit elderly people to the facility in 1930 and it had developed into a care home for elderly people by 1938. The facility joined the National Health Service in 1948 and a new surgical block, known the Highlands Wing in memory of the local Highlands Hospital which had recently closed, was opened in 1995. In 1999 the hospital became part of the Barnet and Chase Farm NHS Hospitals Trust.

A public consultation was carried out during 2007 on reorganising services between Chase Farm Hospital and Barnet Hospital. One option would have transformed Chase Farm to a 'community hospital' with inpatient and major emergency care transferred to Barnet. The other option concentrated on planned care at Chase Farm, with maternity and other services concentrated at Barnet. The proposals were intended to maximise clinical effectiveness given limited human and financial resources; however, they also predicated a substantial investment in community health provision (which never came to pass). The local NHS primary care trusts determined at the end of this consultation (which had only a 2% response rate from the local population) to proceed with 'Option 2'. Two candidates, Catherine Wilkinson and Kieran McGregor, for the "Save Chase Farm" movement were elected to the local council in the local elections of May 2006. They however lost their seats in the 2010 election. Following dismissal of a request for a judicial review, the maternity unit closed in November 2013 and the Accident and Emergency Department closed on 9 December 2013 following the determination of the Barnet, Enfield and Haringey strategy.

Since 2014 the hospital has been part of the Royal Free London NHS Foundation Trust. The Trust discovered a large backlog of patients waiting for elective treatment that year. By April 2015 the trust had reviewed 7,174 patients who have now received treatment. The review concluded that one patient "may have experienced serious harm" and 39 patients had "potentially" suffered "moderate harm", and 68 patients may have suffered "low harm". 1,541 patients were sent to private providers since July 2014, predominantly for endoscopy and ear, nose and throat treatments.

A redevelopment scheme for the site, financed in part by the Government and in part from the proceeds of surplus land, involved the demolition of most of the existing buildings, except the Highlands Wing and part of the Clock Tower building, and the construction of modern facilities. The new Chase Farm Hospital building was officially opened by the Duke of York on 23 May 2019, although a plaque commemorating the occasion was removed several years later amid revelations about his links to sex trafficker Jeffrey Epstein.

== Facilities ==
Apart from the acute hospital, the grounds also contain a general adult mental health unit managed by Barnet, Enfield and Haringey Mental Health Trust, Chase Village (a home for the mentally handicapped and mentally ill), Kings Oak private hospital, a medium-secure psychiatric unit, and services by Enfield Primary Care NHS Trust. The site contains the North London Forensic Service, the forensic psychiatric service covering most of north London (also part of the Barnet Enfield and Haringey Mental Health Trust).

== Transport links ==
London Buses routes 313, W8 and W9 serve the hospital.

== Notable births ==
Notable births at the hospital include:

- Singer Amy Winehouse (1983–2011)
- Love Island presenter Caroline Flack (1979–2020)

== See also ==
- Healthcare in London
- List of hospitals in England
- Save Chase Farm
