= Save Chase Farm =

Map of Greater London showing the results of the 2006 local election. British National Party Christian Peoples Alliance Conservative Green Havering Residents Association Independent Alliance*Rainham & Wennington Independent Residents Group*South Hornchurch Independent Residents Group Labour Liberal Democrat Merton Park Ward Residents Association Respect Save Chase Farm Socialist Alternative The Community Group (London Borough of Hounslow) Striped wards have mixed representation.

Save Chase Farm was a local British political party that stood against the closure of departments of Chase Farm Hospital, Enfield.

Save Chase Farm's leaders were Catherine Wilkinson and Kieron McGregor. They were both elected as local councillors to Enfield Council in May 2006. The party fielded nine candidates in the 2006 local council election. In the May 2010 elections both Wilkinson and McGregor stood again, both lost their seats to the Conservatives. As a political party, they disbanded after the 2010 election but continued to campaign against the closure of the maternity and A&E units of the hospital. They persuaded the council to obtain a Judicial review of the closure. This was unsuccessful; the units closed and redevelopment of the hospital now continues under the administration of the Royal Free London NHS Foundation Trust. The "Save Chase Farm" website does not appear to have been updated since 2010.
