= Ordnance =

Ordnance may refer to:

== Military and defense ==
- Materiel in military logistics, including weapons, ammunition, vehicles, and maintenance tools and equipment
- Artillery
- Artillery shells
- Aircraft ordnance, weapons carried by and used by an aircraft

== Places ==
- Ordnance, Oregon, United States
- Ordnance Island, Bermuda
- Ordnance (Enfield ward), England
- Ordnance (Newham ward), England

== Maps-related ==
- Ordnance datum (from use in ballistics), a vertical datum used as the basis for deriving altitudes on maps
- Ordnance Survey, the national mapping agency for Great Britain

== See also ==
- Ordnance Corps (disambiguation)
