= 1994 Newham London Borough Council election =

1994 local election in England

- 5 May 1994

All 60 seats up for election to Newham London Borough Council 31 seats needed for a majority
- Registered: 151,895
- Turnout: 57,115, 37.60% (▲1.12)

	First party	Second party	Third party
Leader	Stephen C. Timms	Alec J. Kellaway (Note: Kellaway is the de facto leader being the only Lib Dem councillor)	Unknown
Party	Labour	Liberal Democrats	Conservative
Leader since	1990	2 May 1987	Unknown
Leader's seat	Little Ilford	South	Unknown
Last election	57 seats, 60.08%	1 seat, 7.82%	2 seats, 24.33%
Seats before	56	1	3
Seats won	59	1	0
Seat change	▲4	Steady	▼3
Popular vote	75,057	14,958	26,083
Percentage	59.02%	11.76%	20.51%
Swing	▼1.06	▲3.94	▼3.82
Council control before election
Labour
Council control after election
Labour

The 1994 Newham London Borough Council election to the Newham London Borough Council was held on 5 May 1994. The whole council was up for election. Turnout was 37.2%. Labour maintained its overwhelming majority.

== Election result ==
Newham local election result 1994
Party	Seats	Gains	Losses	Net gain/loss	Seats %	Votes %	Votes	+/−
Labour	59	4	1	▲3	98.33	59.02	75,057	▼1.06
Liberal Democrats	1	1	1	Steady	1.67	11.76	14,958	▲3.94
Conservative	0	0	3	▼3	0.00	20.51	26,083	▼3.82
Independent	0	0	0	Steady	0.00	2.60	3,311	▲1.61
BNP	0	0	0	Steady	0.00	2.42	3,084	New
Ind. Lib Dem	0	0	0	Steady	0.00	2.03	2,575	New
Green	0	0	0	Steady	0.00	1.66	2,105	▼5.12
Total	60						127,173	

== Background ==
A total of 175 candidates stood in the election for the 60 seats being contested across 24 wards. Candidates included a full slate from the Labour Party, whilst the Conservative Party ran 57 candidates whilst the Liberal Democrats ran 30 candidates. Other candidates running were 9 Greens, 7 Independent Liberal Democrats, 5 BNP and 7 Independents.

== Results by ward ==
(*) - Indicates an incumbent candidate

(†) - Indicates an incumbent candidate standing in a different ward

=== Beckton ===
Beckton (2)
Party	Candidate	Votes	%	±%
Labour	Maureen Knight*	647	39.99	▼22.66
Labour	Doris Maxwell*	523		
BNP	Michael Davidson	459	31.30	New
BNP	Peter Hart	457		
Conservative	Christopher Boden	290	19.00	▼18.35
Conservative	Valerie Fursland	266		
Independent	Malcolm Williamson	142	9.71	New
Registered electors		3,920		▲80
Turnout		1,566	39.95	▲13.05
Rejected ballots		9	0.57	▼0.01
Labour hold				
Labour hold				

=== Bemersyde ===
Bemersyde (2)
Party	Candidate	Votes	%	±%
Labour	Christopher Rackley	853	48.74	▲4.35
Labour	Victor Turner	843		
Conservative	Paul Clark* (Note: Clark replaced Cllr David Kellaway after his death in 1991)	703	38.10	▲7.98
Conservative	Derek Wigger	622		
Liberal Democrats	William Robinson	233	13.16	▲0.92
Liberal Democrats	Philip Tyrer	224		
Registered electors		4,233		▼143
Turnout		1,855	43.82	▲1.35
Rejected ballots		14	0.75	▲0.43
Labour gain from Conservative				
Labour hold				

=== Canning Town and Grange ===
Canning Town and Grange (2)
Party	Candidate	Votes	%	±%
Labour	Dennis Horwood	1,021	51.93	▼1.62
Labour	Stephen Naulls	914		
Conservative	Ann Lewis	896	48.07	▲20.70
Registered electors		5,708		▲112
Turnout		1,946	34.09	▲2.99
Rejected ballots		3	0.15	▼0.29
Labour hold				
Labour hold				

=== Castle ===
Castle (2)
Party	Candidate	Votes	%	±%
Labour	David McGladdery	1,147	60.65	▲1.79
Labour	Mahmood Ahmad	1,017		
Liberal Democrats	Kathleen Chater	414	23.21	New
Conservative	Karen Ullger	328	16.14	▼8.81
Conservative	Martin Ullger	248		
Registered electors		5,182		▼207
Turnout		1,940	37.44	▲2.00
Rejected ballots		6	0.31	▲0.05
Labour hold				
Labour hold				

=== Central ===
Central (2)
Party	Candidate	Votes	%	±%
Labour	Christopher Allen^{†} (Note: Allen was a sitting councillor representing the Canning Town and Grange ward)	1,398	73.60	▲8.16
Labour	Stanley Hopwood*	1,228		
Liberal Democrats	Marion Gill	262	13.79	New
Conservative	David Hyde	239	12.61	▼6.63
Liberal Democrats	Bernard Barrow	229		
Conservative	Pamela Kirkley	211		
Registered electors		5,308		▼268
Turnout		2,023	38.11	▲1.06
Rejected ballots		7	0.35	▼0.47
Labour hold				
Labour hold				

=== Custom House and Silvertown ===
Custom House and Silvertown (3)
Party	Candidate	Votes	%	±%
Labour	William Chapman*	1,517	43.05	▼7.07
Labour	Lyn Brown^{†} (Note: Brown was a sitting councillor representing the Hudsons ward)	1,434		
Labour	Ivor Bloom	1,375		
Conservative	David Gladstone	805	19.49	▼15.51
BNP	Jeff Edmonds	759	21.58	New
BNP	Vincent Parker	737		
BNP	Kevin Vinecombe	672		
Conservative	Anthoulla Osben	586		
Conservative	Raymond Wallsgrave	567		
Independent	John Ringwood	532	15.88	New
Registered electors		8,656		▼308
Turnout		3,397	39.24	▲8.71
Rejected ballots		9	0.26	▼0.11
Labour hold				
Labour hold				
Labour hold				

=== Forest Gate ===
Forest Gate (3)
Party	Candidate	Votes	%	±%
Labour	Glynis Carpenter* (Note: Carpenter replaced Cllr Pamela Furness after her disqualification in 1992)	1,849	55.93	▼1.04
Labour	Shama Ahmad^{†} (Note: Ahmad was a sitting councillor representing the Upton ward)	1,601		
Labour	Conor McAuley*	1,528		
Liberal Democrats	John Gray	544	14.20	New
Conservative	Christine Hodgson	471	14.70	▼6.30
Green	Louise Pritchard	450	15.17	▼6.86
Conservative	Jonathan Ivinson	429		
Conservative	Doris Rees	409		
Liberal Democrats	Jean Tee	408		
Liberal Democrats	Walter Tee	310		
Registered electors		7,265		▼234
Turnout		2,767	38.09	▼1.32
Rejected ballots		7	0.25	▼0.36
Labour hold				
Labour hold				
Labour hold				

=== Greatfield ===
Greatfield (3)
Party	Candidate	Votes	%	±%
Labour	Kevin Jenkins*	1,411	39.10	▼1.77
Labour	Ian Corbett^{†} (Note: Corbett was a sitting councillor representing the Central ward after he replaced Cllr Pallavi Patel following their resignation in 1992)	1,282		
Labour	Valerie Fone	1,192		
Conservative	Susan Craig	804	23.01	▼18.87
Liberal Democrats	Kathleen King	795	22.86	▲5.61
Liberal Democrats	Kenneth Flemwell	792		
Conservative	Lee Simm	749		
Conservative	Kenneth Ready	733		
Liberal Democrats	David Oxford	683		
Ind. Lib Dem	Frederick Jones	581	15.03	New
Ind. Lib Dem	William Jeffrey	486		
Ind. Lib Dem	Michael Shimmen	426		
Registered electors		7,881		▼374
Turnout		3,603	45.72	▲0.29
Rejected ballots		11	0.31	▼0.14
Labour hold				
Labour gain from Conservative				
Labour gain from Conservative				

=== Hudsons ===
Hudsons (3)
Party	Candidate	Votes	%	±%
Labour	Bryan Collier	1,282	53.42	▲2.47
Labour	Graham Lane*	1,246		
Labour	Neil Wilson	1,199		
Conservative	Jeffrey Spencer	1,122	46.58	▲11.21
Conservative	Stephen Hunt	1,114		
Conservative	Alan Price	1,014		
Registered electors		6,811		▼429
Turnout		2,649	38.89	▲5.63
Rejected ballots		4	0.15	▼0.47
Labour hold				
Labour hold				
Labour hold				

=== Kensington ===
Kensington (2)
Party	Candidate	Votes	%	±%
Labour	Kuldip Singh	1,352	58.51	▼16.21
Labour	Lester Hudson	1,328		
Liberal Democrats	Mohammed Fozdar	802	33.54	New
Liberal Democrats	David Oxford	733		
Conservative	Tina O'Flynn	186	7.95	▼5.96
Conservative	Carol Sarsfield	178		
Registered electors		5,237		▼168
Turnout		2,405	45.92	▲3.66
Rejected ballots		12	0.50	▲0.02
Labour hold				
Labour hold				

=== Little Ilford ===
Little Ilford (3)
Party	Candidate	Votes	%	±%
Labour	Stephen Timms*	1,750	71.06	▲13.32
Labour	Paul Douglas	1,653		
Labour	Andrew Baikie* (Note: Baikie was elected alongside Robin Wales to replace Cllrs Patricia Heron and Bobby Thomas following their resignations in 1992)	1,546		
Liberal Democrats	Mohammed Bashir	374	15.33	▼16.13
Liberal Democrats	Stuart Hunt	358		
Conservative	Linda Lindsay	336	13.61	▲2.81
Liberal Democrats	Chaudhury Koher	335		
Conservative	Colin Robinson	313		
Conservative	Gary Whitmarsh	299		
Registered electors		7,442		▼523
Turnout		2,712	36.44	▼2.54
Rejected ballots		11	0.41	▲0.12
Labour hold				
Labour hold				
Labour hold				

=== Manor Park ===
Manor Park (3)
Party	Candidate	Votes	%	±%
Labour	Amarjit Singh*	1,892	69.67	▲9.93
Labour	Josephine Corbett	1,778		
Labour	Robin Wales^{†} (Note: Wales was a sitting councillor representing the Little Ilford ward, who was elected alongside Andrew Baikie to replace Cllrs Patricia Heron and Bobby Thomas after their resignations in 1992)	1,621		
Liberal Democrats	Maureen Smith	417	15.60	New
Conservative	Stewart Lindsay	413	14.73	▼9.34
Liberal Democrats	Sidney Berman	403		
Liberal Democrats	Pauline Huntbach	364		
Conservative	Ronald Tatum	364		
Conservative	Harold Wilkins	343		
Registered electors		7,952		▲43
Turnout		3,121	39.25	▲0.41
Rejected ballots		10	0.32	▲0.12
Labour hold				
Labour hold				
Labour hold				

=== Monega ===
Monega (2)
Party	Candidate	Votes	%	±%
Labour	William Brown	1,598	65.38	▼10.60
Labour	Christopher Seddon	1,245		
Independent	Jagdish Amin	447	20.55	New
Conservative	Susan Clark	330	14.07	▲0.44
Conservative	Denys Gates	282		
Registered electors		5,288		▼304
Turnout		2,211	41.81	▲1.82
Rejected ballots		9	0.41	▼0.26
Labour hold				
Labour hold				

=== New Town ===
New Town (2)
Party	Candidate	Votes	%	±%
Labour	Carol Knights*	1,188	67.32	▲14.38
Labour	John Isted*	929		
Conservative	Charles Meaby	314	19.52	▲8.20
Conservative	Ian Riddoch	299		
Green	Amanda Sandford	207	13.16	▲3.86
Registered electors		5,116		▲8
Turnout		1,647	32.19	▼6.10
Rejected ballots		8	0.49	▲0.34
Labour hold				
Labour hold				

=== Ordnance ===
Ordnance (2)
Party	Candidate	Votes	%	±%
Labour	Michael Brown*	631	45.09	▼3.62
Labour	Judith Jorsling^{†} (Note: Jorsling was a sitting councillor representing the Plashet ward)	562		
Ind. Lib Dem	Leslie Groombridge	254	17.98	New
Ind. Lib Dem	Alan Stewart	221		
Conservative	Shelley Williams	206	15.56	▼9.42
Liberal Democrats	Martin Edwardes	166	12.08	New
Liberal Democrats	Maurice Page	154		
Green	Alan Canetti	123	9.29	▼17.02
Registered electors		3,909		▼96
Turnout		1,293	33.08	▲5.41
Rejected ballots		12	0.93	▲0.58
Labour hold				
Labour hold				

=== Park ===
Park (3)
Party	Candidate	Votes	%	±%
Labour	Akbar Chaudhary*	1,471	80.03	▲17.96
Labour	Alan Griffiths	1,455		
Labour	John Saunders* (Note: Saunders replaced Cllr Dominic Gough after his resignation in 1993)	1,426		
Conservative	Edna Crawford-Harris	388	19.97	▲0.08
Conservative	Daniel Cripps	358		
Conservative	Phillip Turner	341		
Registered electors		6,712		▼955
Turnout		2,272	33.85	▲0.43
Rejected ballots		8	0.35	▼0.43
Labour hold				
Labour hold				
Labour hold				

=== Plaistow ===
Plaistow (3)
Party	Candidate	Votes	%	±%
Labour	Frederick Warwick	1,077	54.72	▲7.94
Labour	Riaz Ahmed*	1,043		
Labour	Anand Patil*	972		
Conservative	Susan Jackson	380	19.32	▼6.42
Conservative	Albert Stephens	370		
Conservative	Margaret Stephens	341		
Ind. Lib Dem	Josephine Williamson	332	16.14	New
Ind. Lib Dem	Ligaya Stewart	275		
Green	Jacqueline Chandler-Oatts	211	9.82	▼17.66
Green	Arthur Taylor	190		
Green	Graeme Cambage	153		
Registered electors		6,108		▼334
Turnout		2,095	34.30	▼1.05
Rejected ballots		6	0.29	▼0.11
Labour hold				
Labour hold				
Labour hold				

=== Plashet ===
Plashet (3)
Party	Candidate	Votes	%	±%
Labour	John Thorne	1,665	61.47	▲5.20
Labour	Mohammad Khawaja*	1,493		
Labour	Qaisra Khan	1,423		
Conservative	Josephine Child	531	20.29	▼0.70
Conservative	Simon Pearce	477		
Green	Paul Sandford	453	18.24	▼4.50
Registered electors		7,597		▼589
Turnout		2,687	35.37	▼0.76
Rejected ballots		8	0.30	▼0.41
Labour hold				
Labour hold				
Labour hold				

=== St Stephens ===
St Stephens (2)
Party	Candidate	Votes	%	±%
Labour	Abdul Hakim	1,276	78.31	▲6.49
Labour	Abdul Sheikh^{†} (Note: Sheikh was a sitting councillor representing the Kensington ward)	1,193		
Conservative	Dorothy Ford	359	21.69	▲7.09
Conservative	Stanley Kempster	324		
Registered electors		4,994		▼114
Turnout		1,817	36.38	▼2.60
Rejected ballots		13	0.72	▲0.32
Labour hold				
Labour hold				

=== South ===
South (3)
Party	Candidate	Votes	%	±%
Labour	Thomas Jenkinson*	1,462	35.33	▲1.52
Labour	Theodore Etherden^{†} (Note: Etherden was a sitting Councillor representing the Wall End ward)	1,421		
Liberal Democrats	Alec Kellaway*	1,340	29.94	▼4.45
Labour	Anthony McAlmont	1,267		
Liberal Democrats	Elizabeth Laird	1,136		
Liberal Democrats	Elizabeth Lutzeier	1,039		
Conservative	Venetia Hazel	814	20.15	▼11.65
Conservative	Barry Roberts	793		
Conservative	Norman Lewis	759		
Independent	Alexander Thomson	647	14.58	New
Independent	Lillian Hopes	570		
Independent	Lawrence Springthorpe	496		
Registered electors		11,500		▲475
Turnout		4,296	37.36	▼1.43
Rejected ballots		5	0.12	▼0.17
Labour gain from Liberal Democrats				
Labour hold				
Liberal Democrats gain from Labour				

=== Stratford ===
Stratford (2)
Party	Candidate	Votes	%	±%
Labour	James Riley*	876	59.32	▲4.97
Labour	James Newstead*	835		
Liberal Democrats	Fergus Dodd	334	21.76	▲5.46
Liberal Democrats	Paul Hyde	293		
Conservative	Darren Lawrence	197	11.50	▼5.21
Conservative	Nigel Nadolski	134		
Green	Harjinder Flora	107	7.42	▼5.22
Registered electors		4,568		▼426
Turnout		1,575	34.48	▲1.64
Rejected ballots		8	0.51	▼0.04
Labour hold				
Labour hold				

=== Upton ===
Upton (3)
Party	Candidate	Votes	%	±%
Labour	Mian Aslam*	1,784	69.05	▲2.48
Labour	Francis Dowling	1,731		
Labour	Andrew Zachariades*	1,443		
Conservative	Brian Armstrong	400	15.25	▼2.05
Liberal Democrats	Michael Dommett	376	15.71	New
Conservative	Sarah Jones	376		
Conservative	Armyn Hennessy	318		
Registered electors		6,823		▼767
Turnout		2,600	38.11	▲3.84
Rejected ballots		8	0.31	▼0.19
Labour hold				
Labour hold				
Labour hold				

=== Wall End ===
Wall End (3)
Party	Candidate	Votes	%	±%
Labour	Kulwant Mangat	1,514	48.76	▼6.50
Labour	Bashir Hafeez*	1,510		
Labour	Edward Sparrowhawk	1,508		
Liberal Democrats	Mary Holland	554	15.49	New
Conservative	Thomas Clark	546	13.55	▼13.83
Independent	Lillian Erskine	477	15.39	New
Liberal Democrats	Christopher Lees-Smith	445		
Liberal Democrats	Ruth Holland	441		
Conservative	Abdul Hadi	387		
Conservative	Nayran Nair	327		
Green	Charles Seber	211	6.81	▼10.55
Registered electors		8,088		▼166
Turnout		3,004	37.14	▼1.47
Rejected ballots		8	0.27	▼0.29
Labour hold				
Labour hold				
Labour hold				

=== West Ham ===
West Ham (2)
Party	Candidate	Votes	%	±%
Labour	Ronald Manley*	1,111	75.18	▲14.35
Labour	Murtland Inverary	990		
Conservative	Nevzat Duran	352	24.82	▲2.49
Conservative	John Steinberg	342		
Registered electors		5,597		▼145
Turnout		1,634	29.19	▼2.42
Rejected ballots		14	0.86	▲0.03
Labour hold				
Labour hold				
