= Cranham East (ward) =

- Former electoral ward for the Havering London Borough Council
- Cranham East ward boundaries from 1994 to 2002
- Borough: Havering
- County: Greater London
- Population: 6,833 (1991)
- Electorate: 5,998 (1978); 5,953 (1982); 5,923 (1986); 5,723 (1990); 5,675 (1992); 5,420 (1994); 5,410 (1998)
- Major settlements: Cranham
- Area: 1978–1994: 16.46 square kilometres (6.36 sq mi)

Former electoral ward
- Created: 1978
- Abolished: 2002
- Councillors: 2
- ONS code: 02BBFF

Cranham East was an electoral ward in the London Borough of Havering from 1978 to 2002. The ward was first used in the 1978 elections and last used at the 1998 elections. It returned two councillors to Havering London Borough Council.

== List of councillors ==
| Term | Councillor | Party |
|---|---|---|
| 1978–1994 | Rowland Knell | Residents |
| 1978–1982; 1992–2002 | Jean Mitchell | Residents |
| 1982–1992 | William Remfry | Residents |
| 1994–2002 | Geoffrey Lewis | Residents |

== 1994–2002 Havering council elections ==
The boundaries of the ward were adjusted on 1 April 1994.

=== 1998 election ===
The election on 7 May 1998 took place on the same day as the 1998 Greater London Authority referendum.

1998 Havering London Borough Council election: Cranham East
| Party | Candidate | Votes | % | ±% |
|---|---|---|---|---|
| Residents | Jean Mitchell | 1,570 | | |
| Residents | Geoffrey Lewis | 1,465 | | |
| Labour | Anthony Gibbs | 410 | | |
| Labour | John McKernan | 390 | | |
| Conservative | Terence Lewis | 251 | | |
| Conservative | Christine Scott | 158 | | |
| Liberal Democrats | David Bowman | 75 | | |
| Liberal Democrats | Thomas Hall | 70 | | |
| Turnout | | | | |
| Residents hold | | Swing | | |
| Residents hold | | Swing | | |

=== 1994 election ===
The election took place on 5 May 1994.

1994 Havering London Borough Council election: Cranham East
| Party | Candidate | Votes | % | ±% |
|---|---|---|---|---|
| Residents | Jean Mitchell | 1,755 | | |
| Residents | Geoffrey lewis | 1,624 | | |
| Labour | Anthony Gibbs | 672 | | |
| Labour | Jeffery Stafford | 542 | | |
| Conservative | Sheila Ramsey | 364 | | |
| Turnout | | | | |
| Residents win (new boundaries) | | | | |
| Residents win (new boundaries) | | | | |

== 1978–1994 Havering council elections ==
Cranham East ward boundaries from 1978 to 1994

=== 1992 by-election ===
The by-election took place on 5 November 1992, following the resignation of William Remfry.

1992 Cranham East by-election
| Party | Candidate | Votes | % | ±% |
|---|---|---|---|---|
| Residents | Jean Mitchell | 1,190 | 62.9 | |
| Labour | Keith Darvill | 490 | 25.9 | |
| Conservative | Ian Woodward | 212 | 11.2 | |
| Turnout | | | 33.4 | |
| Residents hold | | Swing | | |

=== 1990 election ===
The election took place on 3 May 1990.

1990 Havering London Borough Council election: Cranham East
| Party | Candidate | Votes | % | ±% |
|---|---|---|---|---|
| Residents | Rowland Knell | 1,489 | 48.51 | |
| Residents | William Remfry | 1,320 | | |
| Labour | Arthur Booton | 926 | 30.77 | |
| Labour | Colin Lowry | 855 | | |
| Conservative | Grace Cudby | 652 | 20.72 | |
| Conservative | Doris Hullyer | 547 | | |
| Registered electors | | 5,723 | | |
| Turnout | | 3,083 | 53.87 | |
| Rejected ballots | | 1 | 0.03 | |
| Residents hold | | Swing | | |
| Residents hold | | Swing | | |

=== 1986 election ===
The election took place on 8 May 1986.

1986 Havering London Borough Council election: Cranham East
| Party | Candidate | Votes | % | ±% |
|---|---|---|---|---|
| Ind. Ratepayers | Rowland Knell | 1,461 | | |
| Ind. Ratepayers | William Remfry | 1,308 | | |
| Conservative | Marjorie Ramsey | 626 | | |
| Labour | Arthur Booton | 429 | | |
| Labour | Betty O'Callaghan | 409 | | |
| Alliance | Graham Ford | 243 | | |
| Alliance | Harold Caton | 215 | | |
| Turnout | | | | |
| Ind. Ratepayers hold | | Swing | | |
| Ind. Ratepayers hold | | Swing | | |

=== 1982 election ===
The election took place on 6 May 1982.

1982 Havering London Borough Council election: Cranham East
| Party | Candidate | Votes | % | ±% |
|---|---|---|---|---|
| Ind. Ratepayers | Rowland Knell | 1,561 | | |
| Ind. Ratepayers | William Remfry | 1,496 | | |
| Conservative | Peter Gardner | 804 | | |
| Conservative | Pamela Marsden | 696 | | |
| Labour | Betty O'Callaghan | 294 | | |
| Labour | James Morton | 293 | | |
| Turnout | | | | |
| Ind. Ratepayers hold | | Swing | | |
| Ind. Ratepayers hold | | Swing | | |

=== 1978 election ===
The election took place on 4 May 1978.

1978 Havering London Borough Council election: Cranham East
| Party | Candidate | Votes | % | ±% |
|---|---|---|---|---|
| Ind. Ratepayers | Rowland Knell | 1,544 | | |
| Ind. Ratepayers | Jean Mitchell | 1,496 | | |
| Conservative | Peter Gardner | 955 | | |
| Conservative | Stephen Brabner | 922 | | |
| Labour | Tom Horlock | 544 | | |
| Labour | Frances Eldred | 529 | | |
| Turnout | | | | |
| Majority | | | | |
| Ind. Ratepayers win (new seat) | | | | |
| Ind. Ratepayers win (new seat) | | | | |
