= Grenade (insignia) =

Emblem representing a grenade with a flame

A flaming grenade or a flaming bomb, or shell and flame is an emblem which represents a stylized old style of hand grenade ("bomb"), with a rising flame.

It is a traditional symbol of ordnance missions, e.g., e.g., artillery, grenadier, or fusilier regiments. For example, the "flaming bomb' has become the official insignia of the United States Army Ordnance Corps in 1832, becoming the oldest U.S. army military insignia. It was also adopted by British Grenadier Guards, British Royal Engineers, Royal Horse Artillery, and by the Air Force Munitions Specialists, as well as in other countries long before the United States.

== Examples ==
=== Austria ===
German: flammende granate. With some previous history from Habsburg Monarchy, since 1921 the grenade was a symbol of Austrian Bundesgendarmerie. It was merged into Bundespolizei in 2005 and the grenade was phased out in 2007. In 2008 the grenade has become an insignia of Austrian military patrol and military police, which has become known as simply Military Police since 2019.

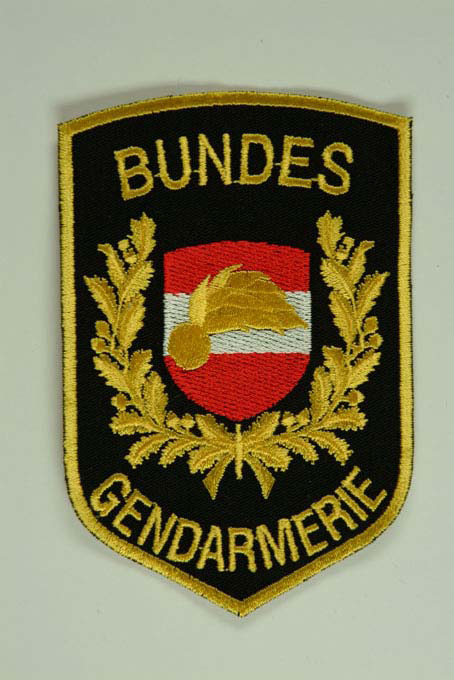
Gendarmerie badge

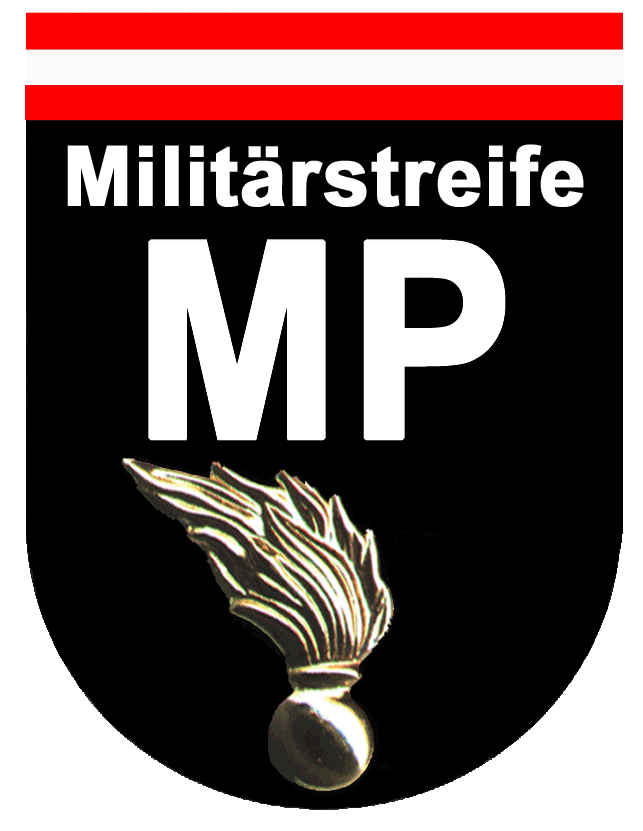
Military patrol badge (until 2019)

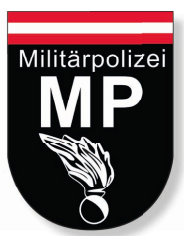
Military police badge

=== France ===
French: "grenade enflammée", "bombe enflammée". Used by Gendarmerie nationale, with history tracing back to the 17th century, when it was the symbol of grenadiers. Later it was adopted by other corps: infantry and artillery, etc.

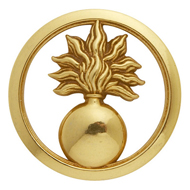
Old-style grenade, used by the military academies, notably the école spéciale militaire de Saint-Cyr

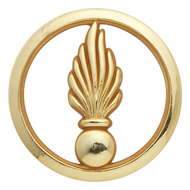
Classic-style grenade, used by many units in the French Army, notably the infantry regiments

Legion-style grenade, used by the Foreign Legion in the French Army

=== Great Britain ===
Cap badge by the Royal Regiment of Fusiliers

=== Italy ===
Italian: "granata fiammeggiante", for Carabinieri, Bersaglieri. A peculiarity of Bersaglieri's grenade is that its flame shoots sideways to the right, rather than upwards, representing the traditional running march of the Bersaglieri.

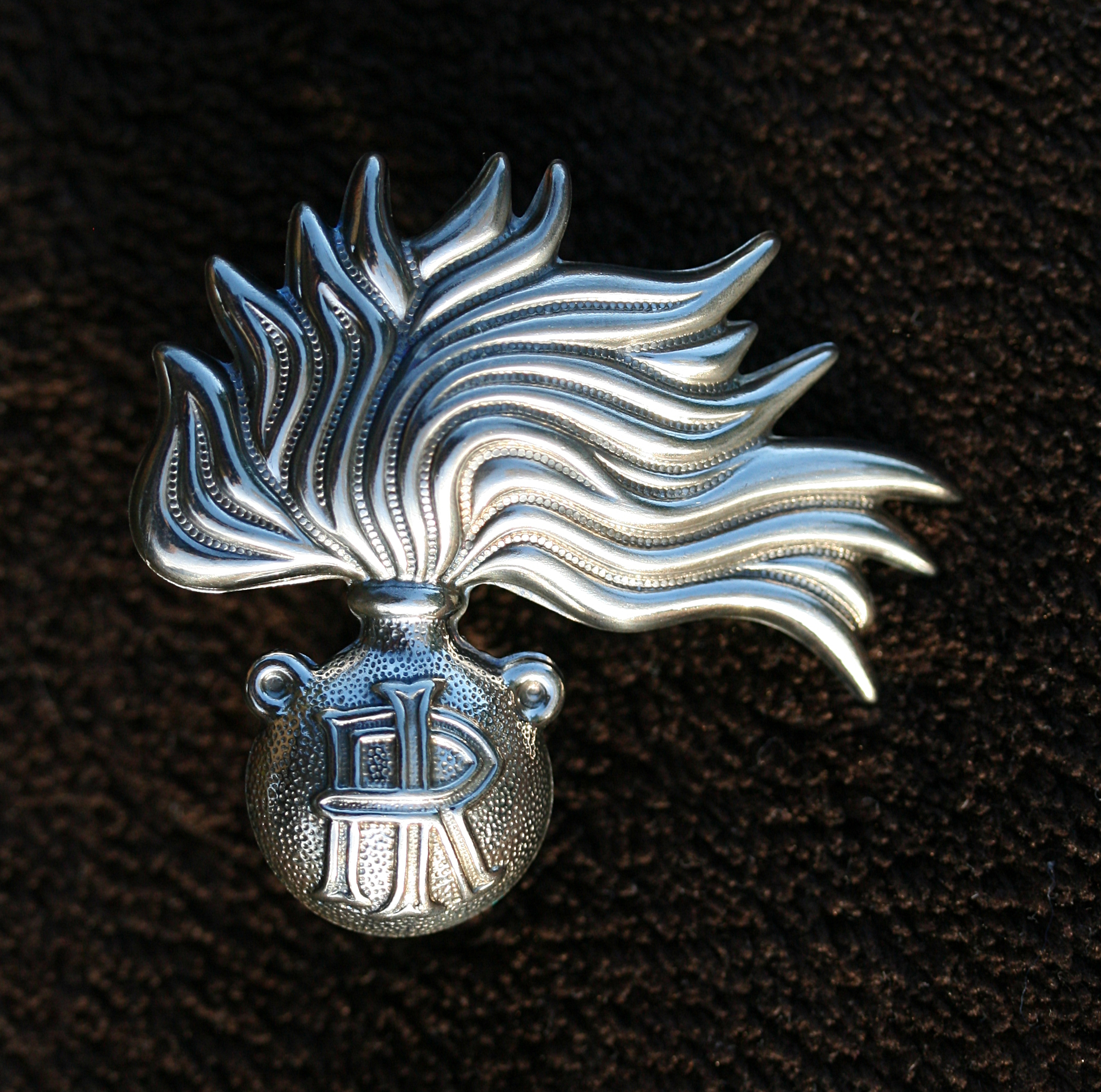
Flaming-style grenade, used by the Carabinieri, the Bersaglieri and some other Army units

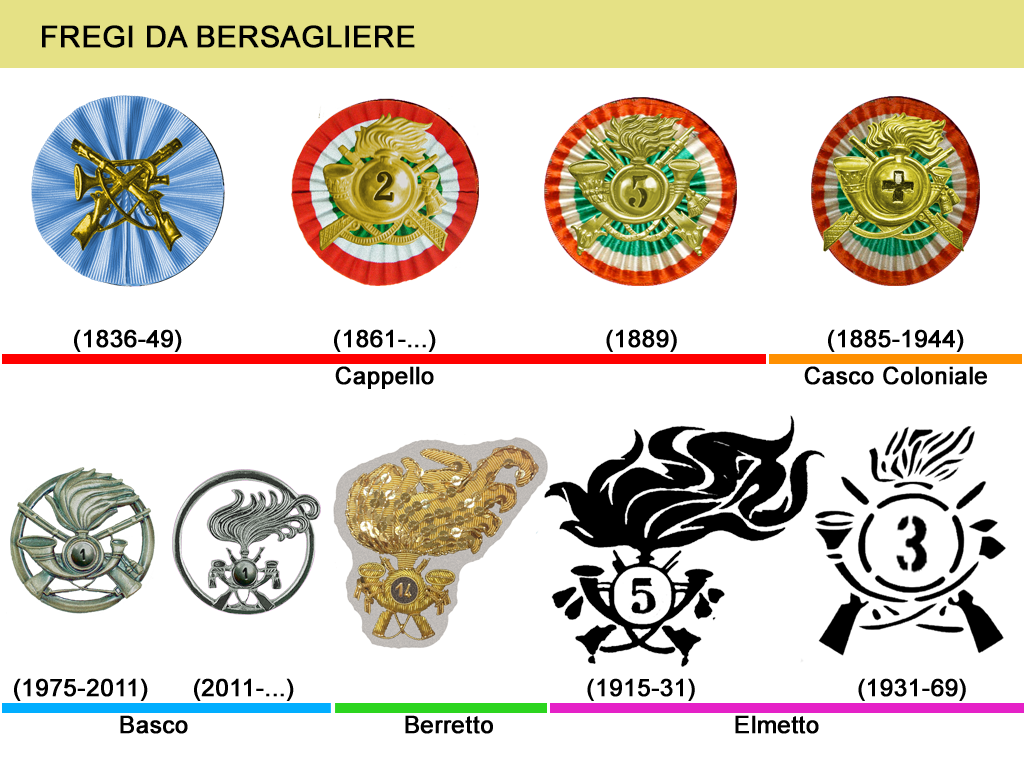
Assorted Bersaglieri insignia

Classic-style grenade, used by the grenadiers, the infantry and some cavalry units

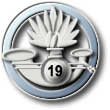
Old-style grenade, used by some cavalry units

=== Sweden ===
Swedish: flammande granat. It is used in artillery. The "grenade with wings" (granat med vingar) is used by aviation. In the past it was also used by grenadier regiments.

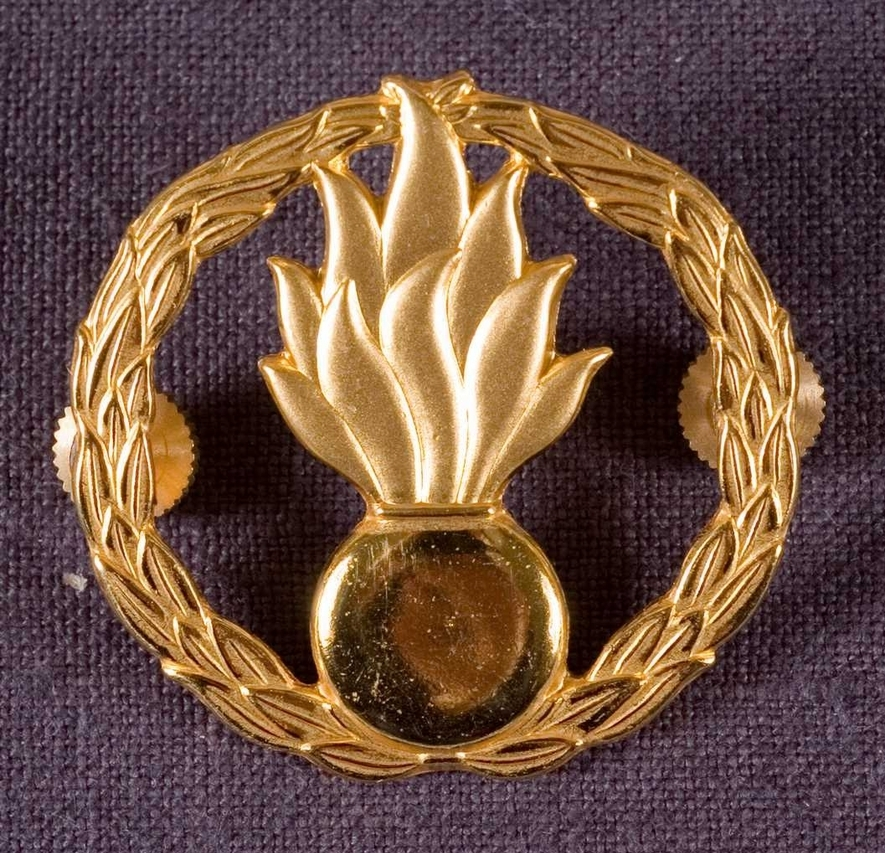
Cap badge of the Swedish artillery

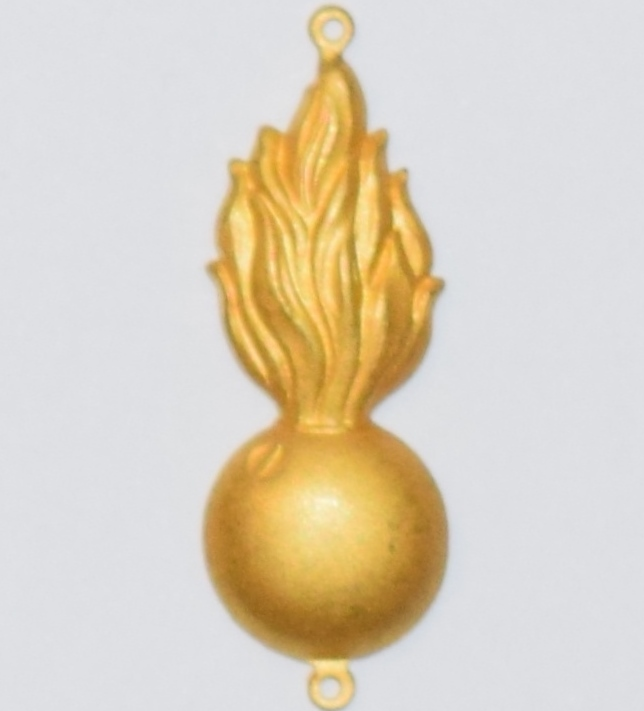
Branch insignia of the Swedish artillery

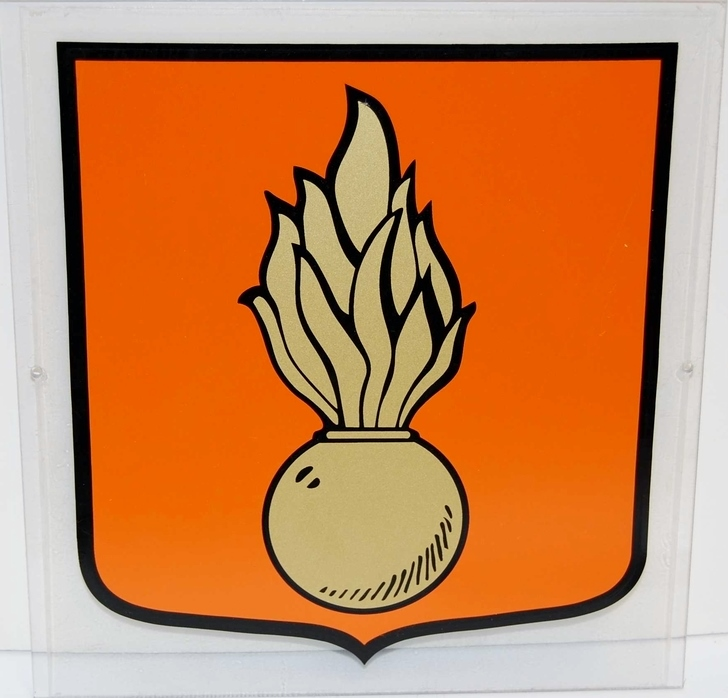
Branch insignia of the Swedish artillery

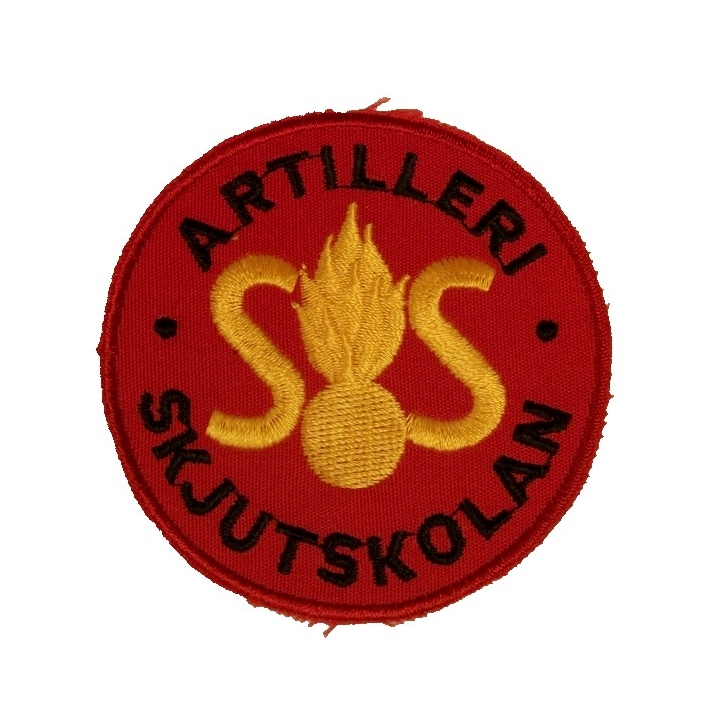
Patch of the Army Artillery School (Artilleriskjutskolan)

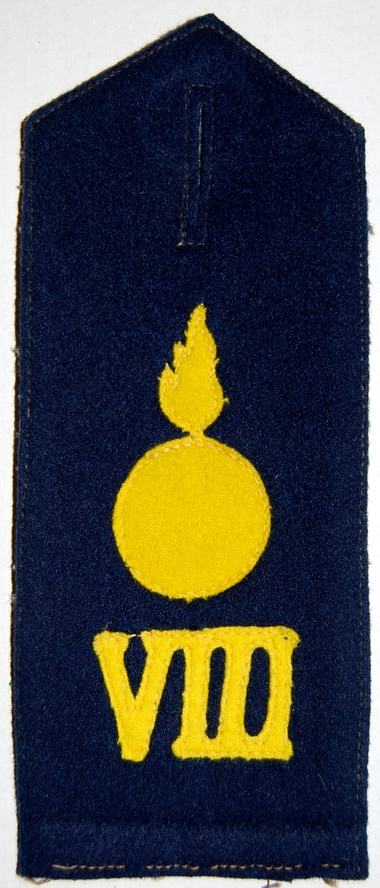
Collor patch of the Boden-Karlsborg Artillery Regiment

=== Ukraine ===
Old-style grenade, used by the National Guard of Ukraine

Classic-style grenade, used by the Mechanized Infantry (Ukraine) of the Ukrainian Ground Forces

=== United States ===
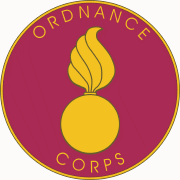
Ordnance Corps plaque

United States Marine Corps master gunnery sergeant rank insignia

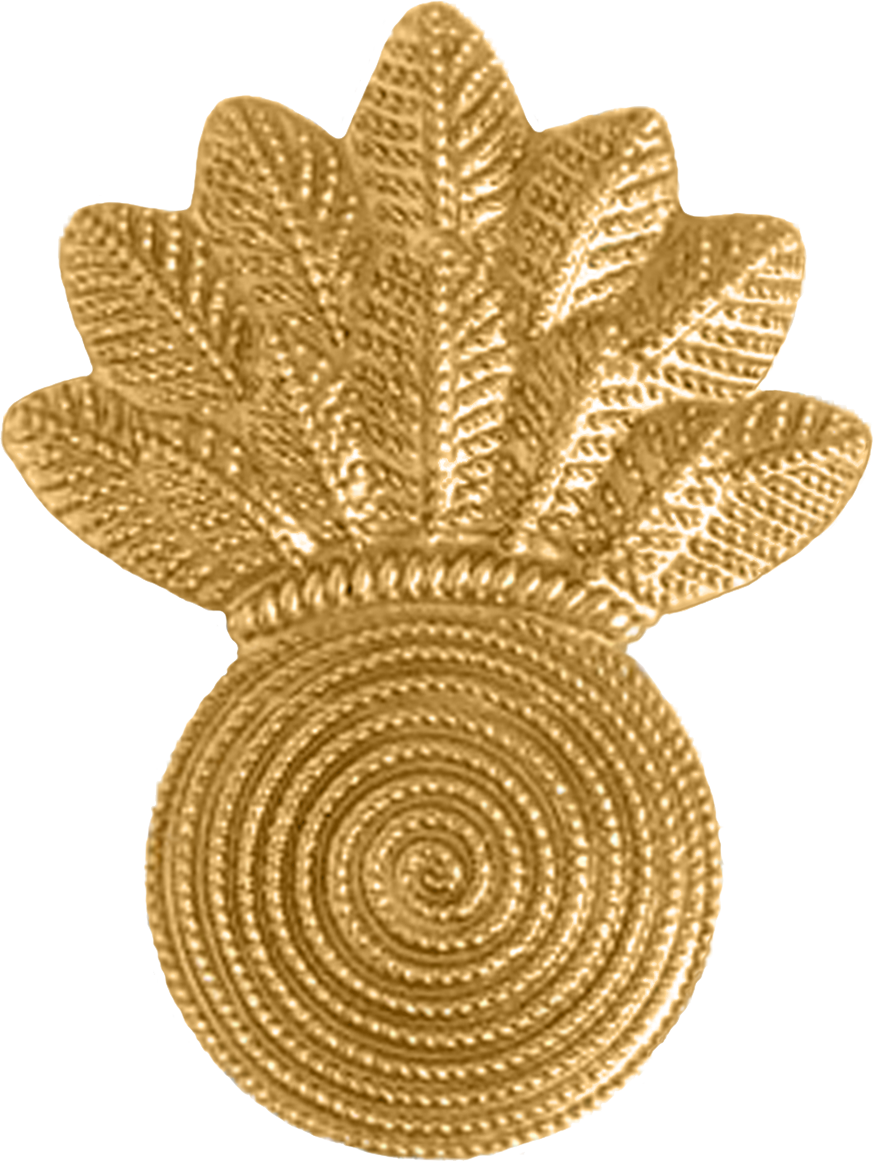
Rank insignia of a United States Marine Corps chief warrant officer gunner

=== Historical ===
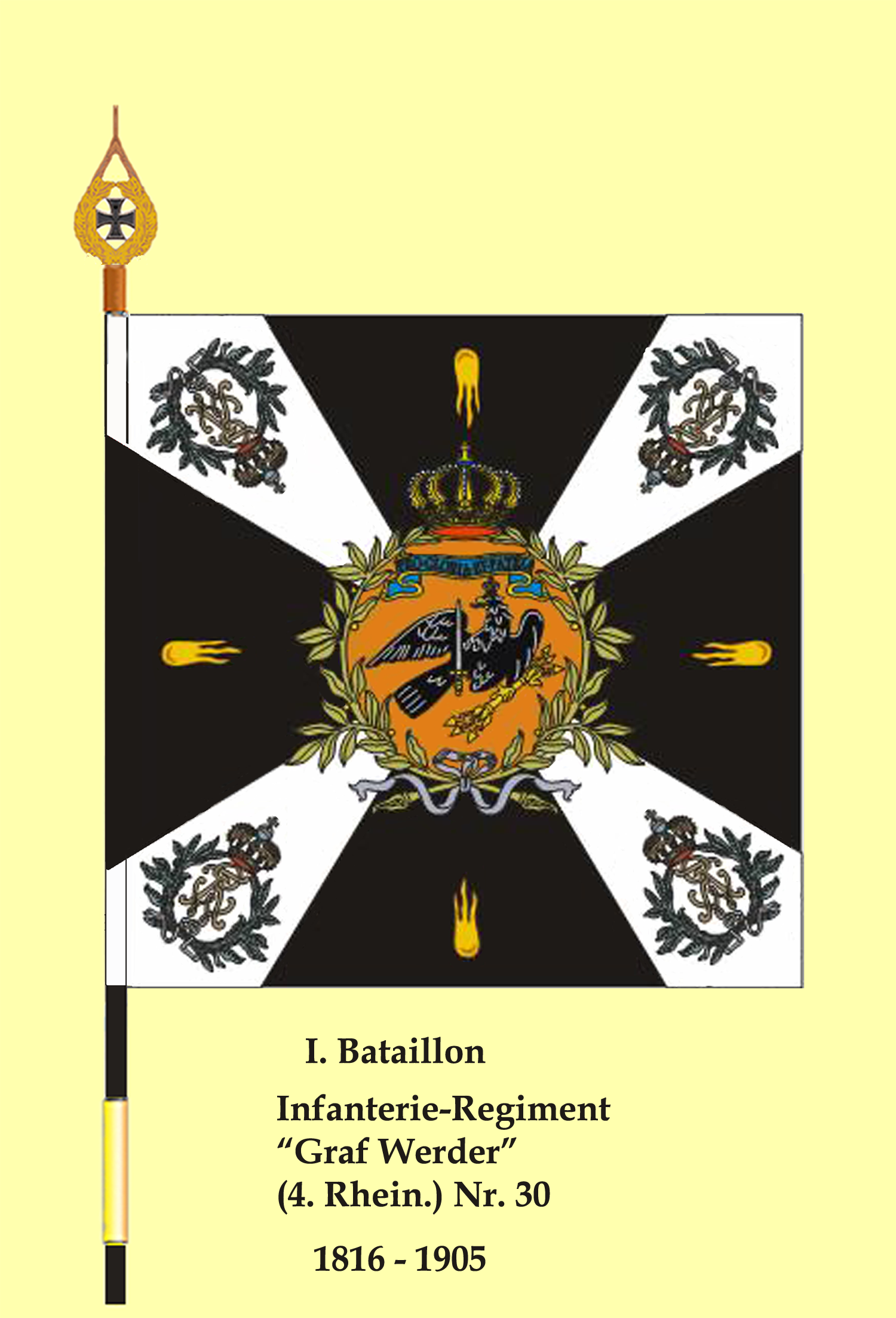
Infantry Regiment "Graf Werder", Prussian Army

== See also ==
- Bomb (icon)
- Grenade (heraldry)
