= 1998 Greenwich London Borough Council election =

1998 local election in England

- 7 May 1998

All 62 seats up for election to Greenwich London Borough Council 32 seats needed for a majority
- Registered: 151,916
- Turnout: 48,986, 32.25% (▼15.35)

	First party	Second party
Leader	Leonard L. Duvall	Unknown
Party	Labour	Conservative
Leader since	1992	Unknown
Leader's seat	Burrage	Unknown
Last election	47 seats, 55.39%	8 seats, 22.41%
Seats before	46	9
Seats won	52	8
Seat change	▲5	Steady
Popular vote	46,910	22,509
Percentage	57.88%	27.77%
Swing	▲2.49	▲5.36
	Third party	Fourth party
Leader	Unknown	Unknown
Party	Liberal Democrats	SDP
Leader since	Unknown	Unknown
Leader's seat	Unknown	Unknown
Last election	3 seats, 15.13%	4 seats, 4.76%
Seats before	3	4
Seats won	2	0
Seat change	▼1	▼4
Popular vote	9,893	Did not run
Percentage	12.21%	Did not run
Swing	▼2.92	▼4.76
Council control before election
Labour
Council control after election
Labour

The 1998 Greenwich Borough Council election took place on 7 May 1998 to elect members of Greenwich Council in London, England. The whole council was up for election and the Labour Party stayed in overall control of the council.

The election saw a number of independent candidates contest seats and the election saw candidates standing as Greens against the Millennium Dome, Conservatives Against Town Hall Corruption, Populist Keep Our Pound and the Corrective Party. However the Labour party was always seen as highly likely to remain in control of the council.

At the same as the election Greenwich saw 74.8% vote in favour of the 1998 Greater London Authority referendum and 25.2% against, on a 32.4% turnout.

== Election result ==
Greenwich local election result 1998
Party	Seats	Gains	Losses	Net gain/loss	Seats %	Votes %	Votes	+/−
Labour	52	6	1	▲5	83.87	57.88	46,910	▲2.49
Conservative	8	1	1	Steady	12.90	27.77	22,509	▲5.36
Liberal Democrats	2	0	1	▼1	3.23	12.21	9,893	▼2.92
Green	0	0	0	Steady	0.00	0.51	412	▼0.90
Fellowship	0	0	0	Steady	0.00	0.46	375	▲0.06
Liberal	0	0	0	Steady	0.00	0.38	307	New
Greenwich People against cuts	0	0	0	Steady	0.00	0.25	198	New
Independent	0	0	0	0	0.0	0.20	164	▼0.02
Ind. Conservative	0	0	0	Steady	0.00	0.18	146	New
Corrective Party	0	0	0	Steady	0.00	0.09	74	New
Populist Party	0	0	0	Steady	0.00	0.07	60	New
SDP	0	0	4	▼4	0.00	0.00	0	▼4.76
Total	62						81,048	

== Ward results ==
(*) - Indicates an incumbent candidate

(†) - Indicates an incumbent candidate standing in a different ward

=== Abbey Wood ===
Abbey Wood (2)
Party	Candidate	Votes	%	±%
Labour	Clive Mardner	979	65.46	▼27.62
Labour	Derek Steedman^{†} (Note: Steedman was a sitting councillor representing the Rectory Field ward)	888		
Liberal Democrats	David Scales	292	19.92	▼16.72
Liberal Democrats	Graciella Grigg	276		
Conservative	Kenneth Bailey	230	14.62	New
Conservative	Gillian Thomas	187		
Registered electors		5,269		▲144
Turnout		1,575	29.89	▼23.05
Rejected ballots		10	0.63	▲0.34
Labour gain from SDP				
Labour gain from SDP				

=== Arsenal ===
Arsenal (1)
Party	Candidate	Votes	%	±%
Labour	Brian O'Sullivan^{†} (Note: O'Sullivan was a sitting councillor representing the St Mary's ward)	398	87.09	▲10.47
Conservative	Norman Gough	59	12.91	▲5.69
Registered electors		2,436		▼4
Turnout		463	19.01	▼19.10
Rejected ballots		6	1.30	▲1.08
Labour hold				

=== Avery Hill ===
Avery Hill (1)
Party	Candidate	Votes	%	±%
Liberal Democrats	Mark Pattenden	564	53.21	▼15.22
Labour	John Littlefield	364	34.34	▼15.21
Conservative	Brian Weller	132	12.45	▲0.01
Registered electors		2,466		▼49
Turnout		1,051	42.62	▼11.54
Rejected ballots		1	0.10	▼0.12
Liberal Democrats hold				

=== Blackheath ===
Blackheath (2)
Party	Candidate	Votes	%	±%
Conservative	Geoffrey Brighty*	1,099	47.12	▲4.52
Conservative	Hugh Harris	1,017		
Labour	Mary Mills	860	37.94	▲2.20
Labour	Nigel Cairns	844		
Liberal Democrats	Michael Smart	348	14.94	▼3.05
Liberal Democrats	Ian Gerrard	323		
Registered electors		5,170		▲205
Turnout		2,322	44.91	▼6.95
Rejected ballots		9	0.39	▲0.20
Conservative hold				
Conservative hold				

=== Burrage ===
Burrage (1)
Party	Candidate	Votes	%	±%
Labour	Len Duvall*	471	76.58	▲3.23
Conservative	Norah Mandeville	76	12.36	▲1.60
Greenwich People against cuts	Richard Newton	68	11.06	New
Registered electors		2,490		▲41
Turnout		621	24.94	▼16.63
Rejected ballots		6	0.97	▲0.48
Labour hold				

=== Charlton ===
Charlton (2)
Party	Candidate	Votes	%	±%
Labour	David Grant	1,020	67.12	▼0.80
Labour	Sajid Jawaid^{†} (Note: Jawaid was a sitting councillor representing the Lakedale ward)	909		
Liberal Democrats	Anthony Smith	236	16.42	▼1.87
Conservative	Patricia Rabbitt	184	11.31	▼2.48
Conservative	John Kelk	141		
Corrective	Lindi St Clair	74	5.15	New
Registered electors		4,832		▲327
Turnout		1,506	31.17	▼14.65
Rejected ballots		14	0.93	▲0.69
Labour hold				
Labour hold				

=== Coldharbour ===
Coldharbour (2)
Party	Candidate	Votes	%	±%
Labour	Jacques Devaux*	1,075	64.31	▲8.18
Labour	John Kelly	873		
Conservative	Philip Dean	572	35.69	▲4.48
Conservative	Frank Hodgson	509		
Registered electors		4,472		▼95
Turnout		1,663	37.19	▼15.91
Rejected ballots		5	0.30	▼0.28
Labour hold				
Labour hold				

=== Deansfield ===
Deansfield (1)
Party	Candidate	Votes	%	±%
Conservative	Alec Miles*	569	49.87	▲2.22
Labour	Arthur Bonner	452	39.61	▲3.96
Liberal Democrats	Barbara Woodcraft	120	10.52	▼6.18
Registered electors		2,626		▲51
Turnout		1,146	43.64	▼15.16
Rejected ballots		5	0.44	▲0.11
Conservative hold				

=== Eltham Park ===
Eltham Park (2)
Party	Candidate	Votes	%	±%
Conservative	Dermot Poston*	1,295	46.28	▲2.85
Conservative	James Simpson*	1,141		
Labour	David Coleman	1,000	36.06	▲1.68
Labour	Martin Roffe	898		
Liberal Democrats	John Hagyard	405	15.39	▼6.79
Independent	Russell White	60	2.28	New
Registered electors		4,839		▲74
Turnout		2,571	53.13	▼6.97
Rejected ballots		5	0.19	▲0.05
Conservative hold				
Conservative hold				

=== Eynsham ===
Eynsham (2)
Party	Candidate	Votes	%	±%
Labour	Barrie Groves* (Note: Groves was originally elected as an SDP councillor but he later defected to Labour)	680	68.63	▲27.58
Labour	Ismail Danesi	668		
Conservative	Pierre Cope	180	17.57	New
Conservative	Harry Barnes	165		
Liberal Democrats	Bonnie Soanes	140	13.80	New
Liberal Democrats	Alexander Grigg	131		
Registered electors		4,839		▲571
Turnout		2,571	53.13	▲1.94
Rejected ballots		5	0.19	▲0.05
Labour gain from SDP				
Labour gain from SDP				

=== Ferrier ===
Ferrier (2)
Party	Candidate	Votes	%	±%
Labour	Mavis Best	678	70.53	▲8.63
Labour	Deborah Smith*	641		
Conservative	Valerie Antcliffe	279	29.47	▼11.08
Conservative	Margaret Campbell-Smith	272		
Registered electors		4,441		▲281
Turnout		1,055	23.76	▼18.16
Rejected ballots		13	1.23	▲0.83
Labour hold				
Labour hold				

=== Glyndon ===
Glyndon (2)
Party	Candidate	Votes	%	±%
Labour	Donald Austen*	907	82.14	▼0.04
Labour	John Wakefield*	740		
Conservative	Jean Cooper	215	17.86	▲0.04
Conservative	Dorothy Withers	143		
Registered electors		5,386		▲351
Turnout		1,201	22.30	▼16.75
Rejected ballots		17	1.42	▲0.15
Labour hold				
Labour hold				

=== Herbert ===
Herbert (2)
Party	Candidate	Votes	%	±%
Labour	Beverley Jones	753	49.94	▼3.52
Labour	Rajwant Sidhu	594		
Conservative	Samuel Coker* (Note: Coker was originally elected as a Labour councillor but later defected to the Conservatives)	488	32.26	▲5.68
Conservative	Catherine McGonagle	382		
Liberal Democrats	Edward Ottery	240	17.80	▲1.57
Registered electors		5,028		▲98
Turnout		1,461	29.06	▼13.29
Rejected ballots		13	0.89	▲0.51
Labour hold				
Labour hold				

=== Hornfair ===
Hornfair (2)
Party	Candidate	Votes	%	±%
Labour	Janet Gillman*	1,029	77.38	▲12.31
Labour	Robert Lewis*	849		
Conservative	Sheila Stirling	298	22.62	▲7.89
Conservative	Pamela Swann	251		
Registered electors		4,452		▼112
Turnout		1,361	30.57	▼16.98
Rejected ballots		9	0.66	▼0.29
Labour hold				
Labour hold				

=== Kidbrooke ===
Kidbrooke (2)
Party	Candidate	Votes	%	±%
Labour	Norman Adams*	741	43.33	▲4.03
Labour	John Cove* (Note: Cove was elected in a by-election triggered by the resignation of Cllr Shahzad in 1997)	712		
Conservative	Daniel Cocker	596	34.30	▲7.85
Conservative	Stephen Landeryou	554		
Fellowship	Ronald Mallone	375	22.37	▲2.66
Registered electors		4,611		▲24
Turnout		1,662	36.04	▼12.71
Rejected ballots		6	0.36	▲0.18
Labour hold				
Labour hold				

=== Lakedale ===
Lakedale (2)
Party	Candidate	Votes	%	±%
Labour	Carl Boothe* (Note: Boothe was elected in a by-election triggered by the resignation of Cllr Gordon-Peiniger in 1995)	671	54.83	▼10.77
Labour	Barbara Barwick	629		
Liberal Democrats	Mark Payne	164	11.68	▼9.79
Independent	Sidney Stacey	164	13.83	New
Conservative	Joan Harvey-Bailey	133	11.22	▼1.71
Liberal Democrats	Judith Pinnington	113		
Green	James Otter	100	8.44	New
Registered electors		4,756		▲314
Turnout		1,181	24.83	▼16.50
Rejected ballots		9	0.76	▲0.43
Labour hold				
Labour hold				

=== Middle Park ===
Middle Park (2)
Party	Candidate	Votes	%	±%
Labour	Robert Harris*	974	65.36	▲5.41
Labour	Barry Taylor*	860		
Conservative	Dingle Clark	238	15.75	▼5.44
Conservative	Margaret Joel	204		
Ind. Conservative	Andrew Graham	146	10.41	New
Liberal Democrats	William Hewer	124	8.48	▼5.26
Liberal Democrats	Harry Potter	114		
Registered electors		4,903		▼66
Turnout		1,480	29.98	▼17.11
Rejected ballots		7	0.47	▲0.17
Labour hold				
Labour hold				

=== New Eltham ===
New Eltham (2)
Party	Candidate	Votes	%	±%
Conservative	Dorothy Mepsted*	1,019	45.52	▲3.24
Conservative	Sidney Nicholson	942		
Labour	Peter May*	938	41.34	▲0.97
Labour	Maresa Kingston	843		
Liberal Democrats	Michael Lewis	235	10.17	▼7.18
Liberal Democrats	Peter Churchill	203		
Greenwich People Against Cuts	Julius Cortes	64	2.97	New
Registered electors		5,202		▲124
Turnout		2,268	43.60	▼11.70
Rejected ballots		8	0.35	▲0.24
Conservative hold				
Conservative gain from Labour				

=== Nightingale ===
Nightingale (1)
Party	Candidate	Votes	%	±%
Labour	Keith Scott*	344	72.88	▲3.02
Liberal Democrats	Robert Diplock	79	16.74	▲5.21
Conservative	Elsie Drew	49	10.38	▼8.23
Registered electors		2,551		▲112
Turnout		481	18.86	▼18.86
Rejected ballots		7	1.46	▲1.13
Labour hold				

=== Palace ===
Palace (1)
Party	Candidate	Votes	%	±%
Conservative	Peter King*	515	44.36	▼0.55
Labour	Andrew Thompson	475	40.91	▲2.07
Liberal Democrats	Helen Blackburn	171	14.73	▼1.52
Registered electors		3,656		▲809
Turnout		1,156	31.62	▼18.82
Rejected ballots		2	0.17	▲0.03
Conservative hold				

=== Plumstead Common ===
Plumstead Common (1)
Party	Candidate	Votes	%	±%
Labour	Victoria Morse*	528	65.59	▼0.84
Liberal Democrats	Paula Mitchell	133	16.52	▼4.54
Conservative	Vera Dempsey	97	12.05	▼0.47
Green	David Harbud	47	5.84	New
Registered electors		2,756		▲103
Turnout		811	29.43	▼22.74
Rejected ballots		6	0.74	▲0.60
Labour hold				

=== Rectory Field ===
Rectory Field (2)
Party	Candidate	Votes	%	±%
Labour	Angela Cornforth	796	62.70	▲7.69
Labour	Gary Parker	744		
Liberal Democrats	Walter Mayhew	286	19.91	▲1.72
Conservative	John Day	226	17.39	▲5.08
Liberal Democrats	Lez Stonnard	203		
Conservative	Maureen Robinson	201		
Registered electors		4,618		▲305
Turnout		1,333	28.87	▼14.65
Rejected ballots		5	0.38	▲0.22
Labour hold				
Labour hold				

=== St Alfege ===
St Alfege (2)
Party	Candidate	Votes	%	±%
Labour	Christopher Roberts*	683	38.52	▼10.52
Labour	Kantabai Patel*	625		
Liberal Democrats	Edward Hill	550	31.27	▲10.31
Liberal Democrats	Daphne Stevens	512		
Conservative	Brian Buckley	362	20.32	▲4.26
Conservative	Hugh O'Leary	328		
Green	Gary Holden	168	9.89	▼4.05
Registered electors		4,508		▲44
Turnout		1,740	38.60	▼6.87
Rejected ballots		4	0.23	▲0.08
Labour hold				
Labour hold				

=== St Mary's ===
St Mary's (2)
Party	Candidate	Votes	%	±%
Labour	Nicholas McShee	658	67.98	▼0.15
Labour	John Fahy*	654		
Conservative	Gbola Oba	318	32.02	▲17.55
Conservative	Christopher Phillips^{†} (Note: Phillips was a sitting councillor representing the Blackheath ward)	300		
Registered electors		4,474		▼213
Turnout		1,125	25.15	▼9.18
Rejected ballots		5	0.44	▼0.06
Labour hold				
Labour hold				

=== St Nicholas ===
St Nicholas (2)
Party	Candidate	Votes	%	±%
Labour	Alistair Macrae* (Note: Macrae was elected in a by-election triggered by the resignation of Cllr Barratt in 1996)	656	62.61	▼0.54
Labour	Claudia Slee*	635		
Liberal Democrats	Sylvia Derrick-Reeve	204	19.79	▼4.24
Liberal Democrats	Martin Jenkins	204		
Conservative	Elisabeth Maisey	188	17.60	▲4.78
Conservative	Cecelia Meers	175		
Registered electors		4,877		▲122
Turnout		1,203	24.67	▼17.98
Rejected ballots		22	1.83	▲1.48
Labour hold				
Labour hold				

=== Sherard ===
Sherard (2)
Party	Candidate	Votes	%	±%
Labour	Michael Hayes*	897	68.13	▲9.48
Labour	Quentin Marsh*	858		
Conservative	Lynda Craker	324	24.34	▲8.96
Conservative	Charles Joel	303		
Green	Terence Liddle	97	7.53	New
Registered electors		5,091		▼25
Turnout		1,361	26.73	▼22.41
Rejected ballots		8	0.59	▲0.43
Labour hold				
Labour hold				

=== Shrewsbury ===
Shrewsbury (1)
Party	Candidate	Votes	%	±%
Labour	Michael Hayes*	621	52.81	▲3.65
Conservative	Lewis Sergeant	489	41.58	▲1.61
Greenwich Residents against cuts	Gerald Sizer	66	5.61	New
Registered electors		2,363		▲8
Turnout		1,182	50.02	▼10.62
Rejected ballots		6	0.51	▲0.37
Labour hold				

=== Slade ===
Slade (2)
Party	Candidate	Votes	%	±%
Labour	Peter Challis^{†} (Note: Challis was a sitting councillor representing the Coldharbour ward)	976	51.33	▲5.90
Labour	Ann Hutchinson	874		
Liberal Democrats	David Woodhead*	725	38.74	▼6.55
Liberal Democrats	Thomas Headon	671		
Conservative	Emily Head	195	9.93	▲0.65
Conservative	Joyce Bowe	163		
Registered electors		4,991		▼19
Turnout		1,956	39.19	▼20.21
Rejected ballots		13	0.66	▲0.53
Labour hold				
Labour gain from Liberal Democrats				

=== Sutcliffe ===
Sutcliffe (1)
Party	Candidate	Votes	%	±%
Liberal Democrats	Brian Woodcraft*	672	55.91	▲0.21
Labour	Mary Peltier	332	27.62	▲7.75
Conservative	Steven Coules	183	15.22	▼9.21
Liberal	Henry Middleton	15	1.25	New
Registered electors		2,794		▲116
Turnout		1,219	43.63	▼13.80
Rejected ballots		6	0.49	▲0.36
Liberal Democrats hold				

=== Tarn ===
Tarn (1)
Party	Candidate	Votes	%	±%
Labour	Terence Malone^{†} (Note: Malone was a sitting councillor representing the Abbey Wood ward. He was originally elected as an SDP councillor but later defected to Labour)	477	48.43	▲12.28
Conservative	Derek Richards*	432	43.86	▼1.87
Liberal Democrats	Catherine Hewer	76	7.72	▼10.40
Registered electors		2,426		▼14
Turnout		980	40.40	▼6.77
Rejected ballots		1	0.10	▼0.16
Labour gain from Conservative				

=== Thamesmead Moorings ===
Thamesmead Moorings (2)
Party	Candidate	Votes	%	±%
Labour	Peter Brooks* (Note: Brooks was elected in a by-election triggered by the death of Cllr Ramsey in 1997)	648	70.24	▲9.01
Labour	Peter Kotz*	551		
Conservative	Laura Murphy	138	15.23	▲4.98
Liberal Democrats	Anthony Durham	124	14.53	▼5.66
Conservative	Ray Maisey	122		
Registered electors		5,230		▲415
Turnout		929	17.76	▼16.80
Rejected ballots		7	0.75	▲0.63
Labour hold				
Labour hold				

=== Trafalgar ===
Trafalgar (2)
Party	Candidate	Votes	%	±%
Labour	Marian Moseley*	911	68.32	▲4.65
Labour	James Gillman*	907		
Liberal Democrats	Andrew Briscoe	290	19.39	▲3.09
Liberal Democrats	Anthony Renouf	226		
Conservative	Andrew Growdon	176	12.29	▲2.50
Conservative	Jennifer Jones	151		
Registered electors		4,927		▲237
Turnout		1,465	29.73	▼14.83
Rejected ballots		12	0.82	▲0.72
Labour hold				
Labour hold				

=== Vanbrugh ===
Vanbrugh (2)
Party	Candidate	Votes	%	±%
Labour	Alexander Grant	979	54.42	▲5.10
Labour	David Picton^{†} (Note: Picton was a sitting councillor representing the Charlton ward)	899		
Conservative	Douglas Ellison	537	29.90	▲6.05
Conservative	Liz Truss	495		
Liberal Democrats	Shirley Broad	311	15.68	▼1.93
Liberal Democrats	David Richardson	230		
Registered electors		4,853		▲150
Turnout		1,820	37.50	▼10.04
Rejected ballots		8	0.44	▲0.22
Labour hold				
Labour hold				

=== Well Hall ===
Well Hall (2)
Party	Candidate	Votes	%	±%
Labour	William Freeman	1,220	58.28	▲6.35
Labour	Raymond Walker*	1,188		
Conservative	Albert Hills	865	41.72	▲6.17
Conservative	Sarah McAllister	859		
Registered electors		5,145		▲106
Turnout		2,220	43.15	▼16.01
Rejected ballots		21	0.95	▲0.61
Labour hold				
Labour hold				

=== West ===
West (2)
Party	Candidate	Votes	%	±%
Labour	Maureen O'Mara	771	64.34	▼1.16
Labour	Jaghir Sekhon*	595		
Liberal Democrats	Anthony Lloyd	275	23.08	▲2.17
Liberal Democrats	Andrew Smith	215		
Conservative	Sarah Phillips	160	12.58	▼1.01
Conservative	Richard Thwaites	107		
Registered electors		4,526		▲494
Turnout		1,220	26.96	▼15.18
Rejected ballots		20	1.64	▲1.52
Labour hold				
Labour hold				

=== Woolwich Common ===
Woolwich Common (2)
Party	Candidate	Votes	%	±%
Labour	Gurdip Dhillon*	754	75.35	▲10.23
Labour	Terry Hales	716		
Conservative	Guy Hatch	244	24.65	▲5.41
Conservative	Elizabeth Harris	237		
Registered electors		4,446		▲147
Turnout		1,104	24.83	▼14.92
Rejected ballots		16	1.45	▲1.04
Labour hold				
Labour hold				
