= Canning Town and Grange (ward) =

Canning Town and Grange was an electoral ward in the London Borough of Newham. The ward was first used in the 1964 elections and last used for the 1998 elections. It returned councillors to Newham London Borough Council.

== Newham council elections ==
=== 1998 election ===
The election took place on 7 May 1998.

1998 Newham London Borough Council election: Canning Town and Grange (2)
Party	Candidate	Votes	%	±%
Labour	Clive Furness	797		
Labour	Robert Wales	617		
Liberal Democrats	Kathleen Chater	267		
Conservative	Brendan Morley	191		
BNP	Michael Davidson	186		
Conservative	Simon Pearce	145		
Turnout			22.8	
Registered electors		5,483		
Labour hold		Swing		
Labour hold		Swing		

=== 1997 by-election ===
The by-election took place on 7 May 1997, following the resignation of Dennis Horwood.

1997 Canning Town and Grange by-election
Party	Candidate	Votes	%	±%
Labour	Clive Furness	1,567		
Conservative	Christopher Boden	558		
BNP	Michael Davidson	407		
Liberal Democrats	Kathleen King	282		
Newham Independent	Keith Woodman	122		
Turnout				
Labour hold		Swing		
