= Ordnance (Newham ward) =

- Former electoral ward for the Newham London Borough Council
- Ordnance ward boundaries from 1978 to 2002
- Borough: Newham
- County: Greater London
- Electorate: 3,493 (1998)
- Major settlements: Canning Town

Former electoral ward
- Created: 1965
- Abolished: 2002
- Councillors: 2

Ordnance was an electoral ward in the London Borough of Newham. The ward was first used in the 1964 elections and last used for the 1998 elections. It returned councillors to Newham London Borough Council.

== 1978–2002 Newham council elections ==
=== 1998 election ===
The election on 7 May 1998 took place on the same day as the 1998 Greater London Authority referendum.

1998 Newham London Borough Council election: Ordnance
Party	Candidate	Votes	%	±%
Labour	Marie Collier	475	33.27	▲0.19
Labour	Megan Harris	407		
Independent	Alan Craig	311	23.46	New
Independent	Benjamin Stafford	225	16.97	New
Liberal Democrats	Peter Guest	175	13.20	▲1.12
BNP	Kenneth Francis	101	7.62	New
Conservative	Geraldine Alden	78	5.47	▼10.09
Conservative	Richard Arnopp	67		
Registered electors		3,493		▼416
Turnout		1,058	30.29	▼2.79
Rejected ballots		3	0.28	▼0.65
Labour hold		Swing		
Labour hold		Swing		

=== 1994 election ===
The election took place on 5 May 1994.

=== 1990 election ===
The election took place on 3 May 1990.

=== 1986 election ===
The election took place on 8 May 1986.

=== 1982 election ===
The election took place on 6 May 1982.

=== 1978 election ===
The election took place on 4 May 1978.

== 1964–1978 Newham council elections ==
=== 1974 election ===
The election took place on 2 May 1974.

=== 1971 election ===
The election took place on 13 May 1971.

=== 1968 election ===
The election took place on 9 May 1968.

=== 1964 election ===
The election took place on 7 May 1964.

1964 Newham London Borough Council election: Ordnance
Party	Candidate	Votes	%	±%
Labour	F. Radley	996	79.1	N/A
Labour	A. Gannon	950		N/A
Liberal	A. Barr	263	20.9	N/A
Liberal	E. McGrane	221		N/A
Turnout		1,297	23.0	N/A
Registered electors		5,635		
Labour win (new seat)				
Labour win (new seat)				
