= Plashet (ward) =

- Electoral ward for the Newham London Borough Council
- Plashet ward boundaries since 2022
- Borough: Newham
- County: Greater London
- Population: 11,617 (2021) (Note: 2021 Census data reported for 2022 ward boundaries)
- Electorate: 7,424 (2022)
- Major settlements: Plashet
- Area: 0.7040 square kilometres (0.2718 sq mi)

Current electoral ward
- Created: 2022
- Number of members: 2
- Councillors: Zuber Gulamussen; Pushpa Makwana
- GSS code: E05013921

Plashet is an electoral ward in the London Borough of Newham. The ward was originally created in 1965 and abolished in 2002. It was created again for the 2022 elections. It returns councillors to Newham London Borough Council.

== List of councillors ==
| Term | Councillor | Party |
|---|---|---|
| 2022–present | Zuber Gulamussen (Note: Zuber Gulamussen changed parties in 2023.) | Labour |
| 2022–present | Zuber Gulamussen | NIP |
| 2022–present | Pushpa Makwana | Labour |

== Newham council elections since 2022 ==
There was a revision of ward boundaries in Newham in 2022. The ward of Plashet was recreated.

=== 2022 election ===
The election took place on 5 May 2022.

2022 Newham London Borough Council election: Plashet (2)
| Party | Candidate | Votes | % | ±% |
|---|---|---|---|---|
| Labour | Zuber Gulamussen | 1,378 | 62.3 | N/A |
| Labour | Pushpa Makwana | 1,115 | 50.4 | N/A |
| Independent | Mehmood Mirza | 919 | 41.6 | N/A |
| Conservative | Attic Rahman | 544 | 24.6 | N/A |
| Green | Stephen Charles | 256 | 11.6 | N/A |
| Green | Josh Robinson | 210 | 9.5 | N/A |
| Turnout | | 2,606 | 35.1 | N/A |
| Registered electors | | 7,424 | | |
| Labour win (new seat) | | | | |
| Labour win (new seat) | | | | |

== 1978–2002 Newham council elections ==
There was a revision of ward boundaries in Newham in 1978

=== 1998 election ===
The election took place on 7 May 1998.

1998 Newham London Borough Council election: Plashet (3)
| Party | Candidate | Votes | % | ±% |
|---|---|---|---|---|
| Labour | John Thorne | 1,231 | 60.15 | ▼1.32 |
| Labour | Rupinder Nandra | 1,192 | | |
| Labour | Harbans Jabbal | 1,175 | | |
| Conservative | Nafis Rafiq | 600 | 24.81 | ▲4.52 |
| Conservative | Josephine Child | 482 | | |
| Conservative | Barry Roberts | 402 | | |
| Socialist Labour | Paul Sandford | 300 | 15.05 | New |
| Registered electors | | 7,219 | | ▼378 |
| Turnout | | 2,185 | 30.27 | ▼5.10 |
| Rejected ballots | | 27 | 1.24 | ▲0.94 |
| Labour hold | | | | |
| Labour hold | | | | |
| Labour hold | | | | |

=== 1994 election ===
The election took place on 5 May 1994.

1994 Newham London Borough Council election: Plashet (3)
| Party | Candidate | Votes | % | ±% |
|---|---|---|---|---|
| Labour | John Thorne | 1,665 | 61.47 | ▲5.20 |
| Labour | Mohammad Khawaja | 1,493 | | |
| Labour | Qaisra Khan | 1,423 | | |
| Conservative | Josephine Child | 531 | 20.29 | ▼0.70 |
| Conservative | Simon Pearce | 477 | | |
| Green | Paul Sandford | 453 | 18.24 | ▼4.50 |
| Registered electors | | 7,597 | | ▼589 |
| Turnout | | 2,687 | 35.37 | ▼0.76 |
| Rejected ballots | | 8 | 0.30 | ▼0.41 |
| Labour hold | | | | |
| Labour hold | | | | |
| Labour hold | | | | |
