= 1998 London local elections =

- 7 May 1998

All 1,917 on all 32 London boroughs
- Turnout: 34.8% (▼11.4%)
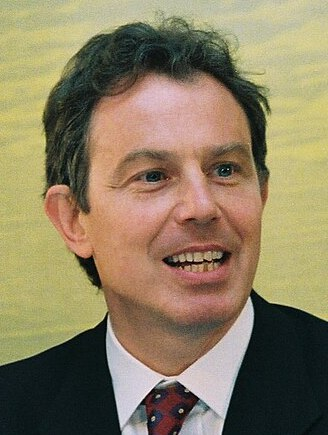

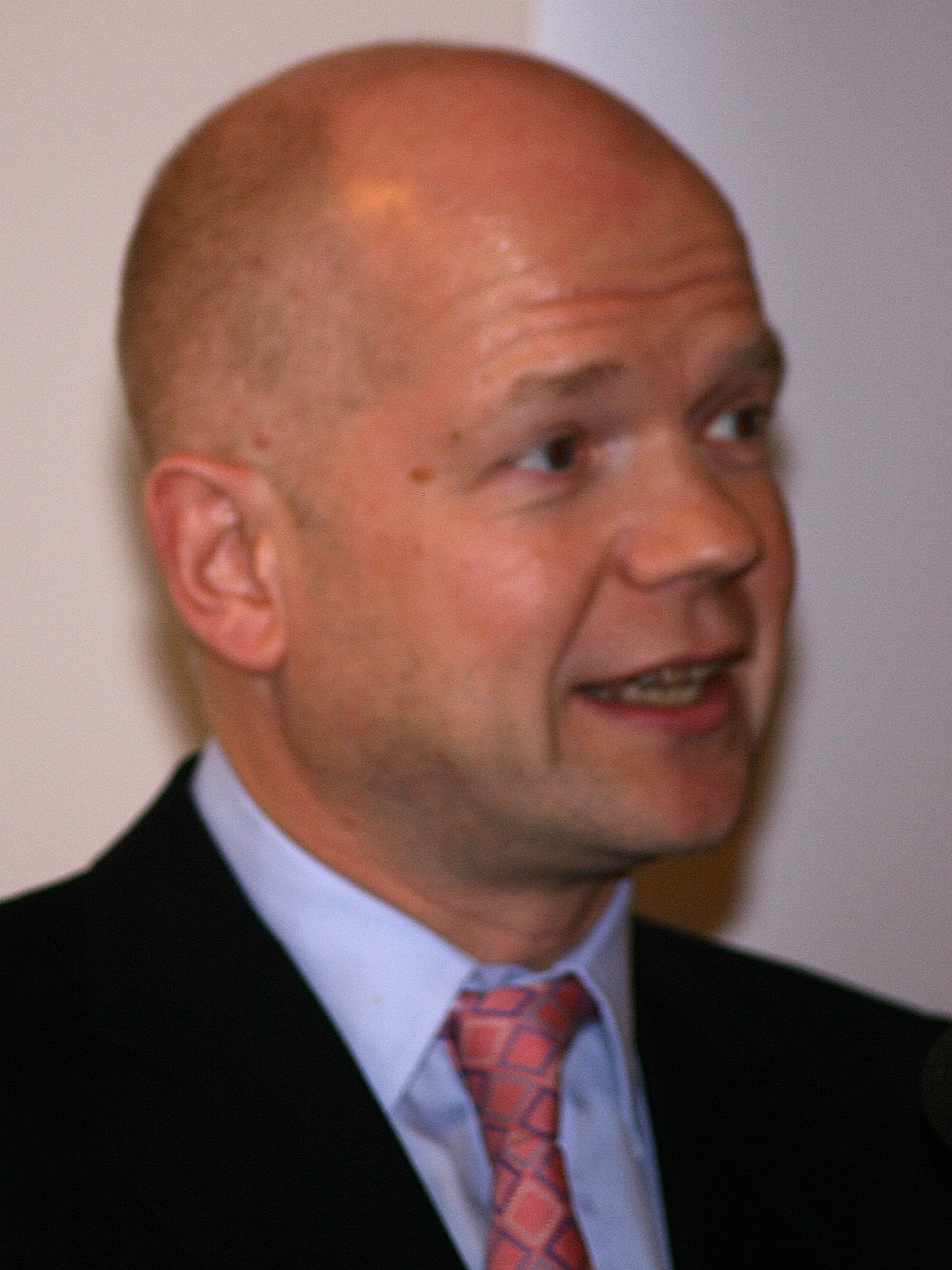

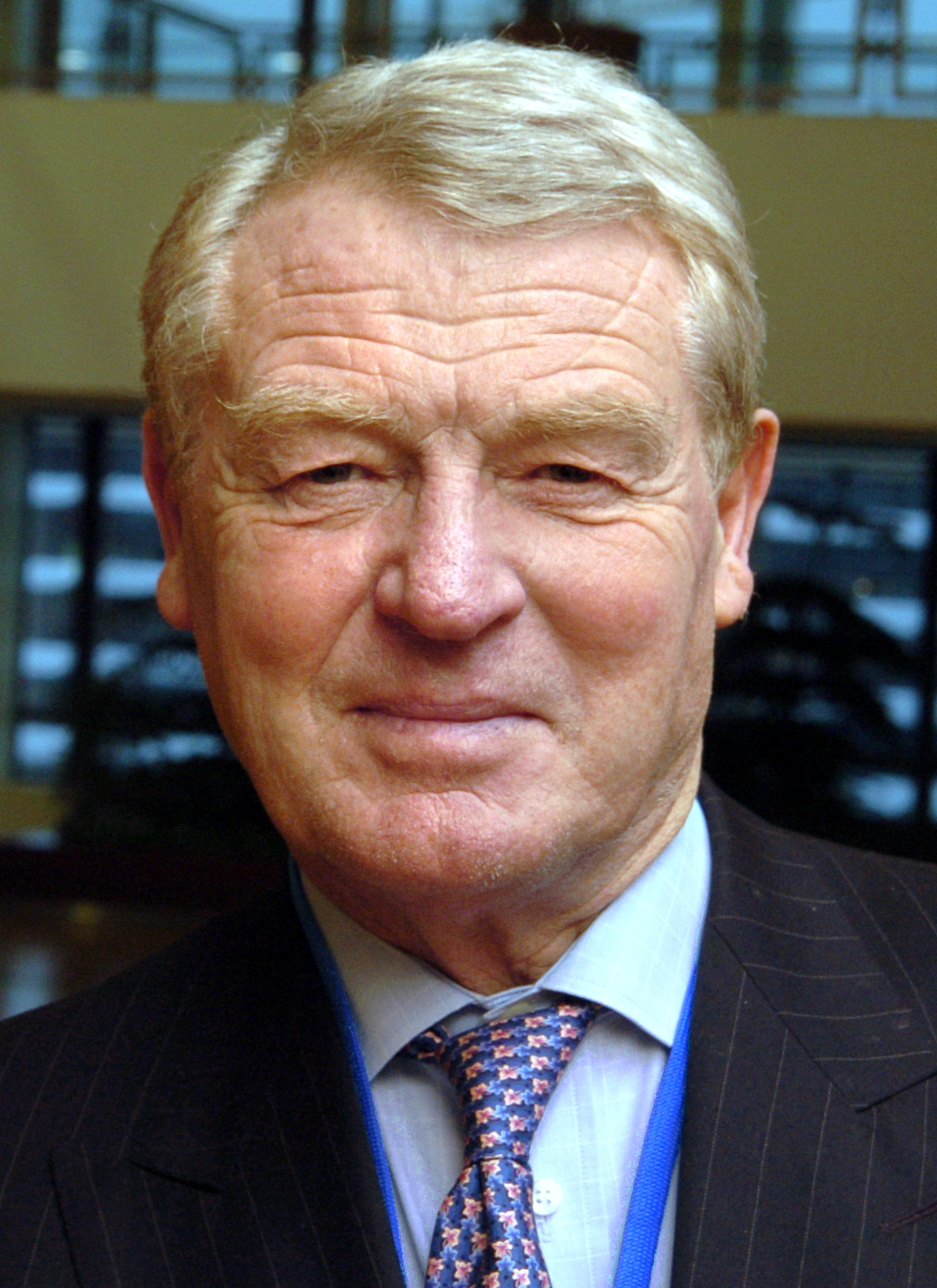
	First party	Second party	Third party
Leader	Tony Blair	William Hague	Paddy Ashdown
Party	Labour	Conservative	Liberal Democrats
Leader since	21 July 1994	19 June 1997	16 July 1988
Popular vote	708,380	558,060	362,913
Percentage	40.7%	32.0%	20.8%
Swing	▼0.9%	▲0.8%	▼1.2%
Councils	18	4	2
Councils +/–	▲1	Steady	▼1
Councillors	1,050	538	301
Councillors +/–	▲6	▲19	▼22
- Results by Borough in 1998.

Local government elections took place in London, and some other parts of the United Kingdom on Thursday 7 May 1998.

All London borough council seats were up for election.

The 1998 Greater London Authority referendum was held in the same voting locations.

== Results summary ==
Party	Votes won	% votes	Change	Seats	% seats	Change	Councils	Change
Labour	708,380	40.7	-0.9	1,050	54.8	+6	18	+1
Conservative	558,060	32.0	+0.8	538	28.1	+19	4	±0
Liberal Democrats	362,913	20.8	-1.2	301	15.7	-22	2	-1
Green	50,732	2.9	+0.7	2	0.1	+2	0	±0
Others	62,172	3.6	+0.7	26	1.4	-5	0	±0
No overall control	n/a	n/a	n/a	n/a	n/a	n/a	8	±0

- Turnout: 1,738,868 voters cast ballots, a turnout of 34.8% (-11.4%).

== Councils results ==
Council	Previous control	Result	Details
Barking and Dagenham	Labour	Labour	Details
Barnet	No overall control	No overall control	Details
Bexley	No overall control	Conservative	Details
Brent	No overall control	Labour	Details
Bromley	Conservative	No overall control	Details
Camden	Labour	Labour	Details
Croydon	Labour	Labour	Details
Ealing	Labour	Labour	Details
Enfield	Labour	Labour	Details
Greenwich	Labour	Labour	Details
Hackney	Labour	No overall control	Details
Hammersmith and Fulham	Labour	Labour	Details
Haringey	Labour	Labour	Details
Harrow	No overall control	Labour	Details
Havering	No overall control	No overall control	Details
Hillingdon	Labour	No overall control	Details
Hounslow	Labour	Labour	Details
Islington	Labour	No overall control	Details
Kensington and Chelsea	Conservative	Conservative	Details
Kingston upon Thames	Liberal Democrats	No overall control	Details
Lambeth	No overall control	Labour	Details
Lewisham	Labour	Labour	Details
Merton	Labour	Labour	Details
Newham	Labour	Labour	Details
Redbridge	No overall control	No overall control	Details
Richmond upon Thames	Liberal Democrats	Liberal Democrats	Details
Southwark	Labour	Labour	Details
Sutton	Liberal Democrats	Liberal Democrats	Details
Tower Hamlets	Labour	Labour	Details
Waltham Forest	No overall control	Labour	Details
Wandsworth	Conservative	Conservative	Details
Westminster	Conservative	Conservative	Details

== Overall councillor numbers ==
London local elections 1998 Councillor statistics
Party	Seats	Gain/loss
Labour	1,050	+6
Conservative	538	+19
Liberal Democrats	301	-22
Others	28	-31

== Borough result maps ==
Barnet 1998 results map

Camden 1998 results map

Hammersmith and Fulham 1998 results map
