= Ordnance (Enfield ward) =

- Former electoral ward for the Enfield London Borough Council
- Borough: Enfield
- County: Greater London
- Electorate: 7,563 (1978)
- Major settlements: Enfield Lock

Former electoral ward
- Created: 1965
- Abolished: 1982
- Councillors: 2

Ordnance was an electoral ward in the London Borough of Enfield from 1965 to 1982. The ward was first used in the 1964 elections and last used for the 1978 elections. It returned councillors to Enfield London Borough Council. For elections to the Greater London Council, the ward was part of the Enfield electoral division from 1965 and then the Enfield North division from 1973.

== Enfield council elections ==
=== 1978 election ===
The election took place on 4 May 1978.

=== 1974 election ===
The election took place on 2 May 1974.

=== 1971 election ===
The election took place on 13 May 1971.

1971 Enfield London Borough Council election: Ordnance
| Party | Candidate | Votes | % | ±% |
|---|---|---|---|---|
| Labour | W. Haynes | 1,812 | | |
| Labour | I. Garvey | 1,796 | | |
| Conservative | R. Jameson | 717 | | |
| Conservative | J. Penney | 708 | | |
| Turnout | | | | |
| Labour gain from Conservative | | Swing | | |
| Labour gain from Conservative | | Swing | | |

=== 1968 election ===
The election took place on 9 May 1968.

1968 Enfield London Borough Council election: Ordnance
| Party | Candidate | Votes | % | ±% |
|---|---|---|---|---|
| Conservative | J. Penney | 1,645 | | |
| Conservative | A. Prior | 1,573 | | |
| Labour | V. Clements | 1,009 | | |
| Labour | F. Varney | 1,001 | | |
| Turnout | | | | |
| Conservative gain from Labour | | Swing | | |
| Conservative gain from Labour | | Swing | | |

=== 1964 election ===
The election took place on 7 May 1964.

1964 Enfield London Borough Council election: Ordnance
| Party | Candidate | Votes | % | ±% |
|---|---|---|---|---|
| Labour | F. Varney | 1,304 | | |
| Labour | V. Clements | 1,287 | | |
| Conservative | J. Wells | 658 | | |
| Conservative | E. Harvey | 655 | | |
| Liberal | E. Brown | 183 | | |
| Liberal | S. Thomson | 177 | | |
| Turnout | | 2,174 | 31.2 | |
| Labour win (new seat) | | | | |
| Labour win (new seat) | | | | |
