= 1998 Newham London Borough Council election =

1998 local election in England

1998 Newham London Borough Council elections
- 7 May 1998

All 60 council seats to Newham London Borough Council 31 seats needed for a majority
- Registered: 139,273
- Turnout: 39,550, 28.40% (▼9.20)

	First party	Second party	Third party
Leader	Robert A. Wales	Unknown	Unknown
Party	Labour	Liberal Democrats	Conservative
Leader since	1995	Unknown	Unknown
Leader's seat	Canning Town and Grange	Unknown	Unknown
Last election	59 seats, 59.02%	1 seat, 11.76%	0 seats, 20.51%
Seats before	60	0	0
Seats won	60	0	0
Seat change	▲1	Steady	▼1
Popular vote	59,146	2,745	10,767
Percentage	74.29%	3.45%	13.52%
Swing	▲15.27	▼8.31	▼6.99
Council control before election
Labour
Council control after election
Labour

The 1998 Newham London Borough election for the Newham London Borough Council was held on 7 May 1998. The whole council was up for election. Turnout was 28.4%. Labour won every seat for the second time since the councils formation.

== Background ==
In between the 1994 election and this election there were a total of 7 by-elections to replace councillors who resigned from their seat, however none of these by-elections resulted in the seat changing parties. As well as these by-elections there was 1 defection of the only Lib Dem councillor to the Labour Party, which meant the composition of the council just before the election was as follows:

↓
60
Labour

A total of 138 candidates stood in the election for the 60 seats being contested across 24 wards. Candidates included a full slate from the Labour Party, whilst the Conservative Party ran 31 candidates and the Liberal Democrats ran 11 candidates. In both cases this was a lot less than 4 years before. Other candidates running were 8 Socialist Labour, 2 National Democrats, 11 BNP, 1 Monster Raving Looney and 14 Independents.

== Election results ==
Newham local election result 1998
Party	Seats	Gains	Losses	Net gain/loss	Seats %	Votes %	Votes	+/−
Labour	60	1	0	▲1	100.00	74.29	59,146	▲15.27
Conservative	0	0	0	Steady	0.00	13.52	10,767	▼6.99
Liberal Democrats	0	0	1	▼1	0.00	3.45	2,745	▼8.31
Newham Independents	0	0	0	Steady	0.00	3.13	2,490	New
BNP	0	0	0	Steady	0.00	2.60	2,073	▲0.18
Independent	0	0	0	Steady	0.00	1.53	1,220	▼1.07
Residents	0	0	0	Steady	0.00	1.38	1,099	New
Monster Raving Loony	0	0	0	Steady	0.00	0.10	76	New
Total	60						79,616	

After the election the composition of the council was as follows:

↓
60
Labour

== Ward results ==
(*) - Indicates an incumbent candidate

(†) - Indicates an incumbent candidate standing in a different ward

=== Beckton ===
Beckton (2)
Party	Candidate	Votes	%	±%
Labour	Maureen Knight*	688	63.10	▲23.11
Labour	Sarah Ruiz^{†} (Note: Ruiz was originally a councillor representing the South ward. She was elected in a by-election triggered by the death of Cllr Thomas Jenkinson in 1995)	461		
BNP	Peter Hart	168	18.45	▼12.85
Conservative	Nigel Lucker	168	18.45	▼0.55
Registered electors		3,796		▼124
Turnout		955	25.16	▼14.79
Rejected ballots		3	0.31	▼0.26
Labour hold				
Labour hold				

=== Bemersyde ===
Bemersyde (2)
Party	Candidate	Votes	%	±%
Labour	Victor Turner*	898	71.94	▲23.20
Labour	Gregory Vincent	815		
Newham Independent	Donald Freeman	334	28.06	New
Registered electors		4,015		▼218
Turnout		1,270	31.63	▼12.19
Rejected ballots		23	1.81	▲1.06
Labour hold				
Labour hold				

=== Canning Town and Grange ===
Canning Town and Grange (2)
Party	Candidate	Votes	%	±%
Labour	Clive Furness* (Note: Furness was elected in a by-election triggered by the resignation of Cllr Dennis Horwood in 1997)	797	57.57	▲5.64
Labour	Robin Wales^{†} (Note: Wales was a sitting councillor representing the Manor Park ward)	617		
Conservative	Brendan Morley	191	13.68	▼34.39
BNP	Michael Davidson	186	15.15	New
Liberal Democrats	Kathleen Chater	167	13.60	New
Conservative	Simon Pearce	145		
Registered electors		5,483		▼225
Turnout		1,250	22.80	▼11.29
Rejected ballots		11	0.88	▲0.73
Labour hold				
Labour hold				

=== Castle ===
Castle (2)
Party	Candidate	Votes	%	±%
Labour	David McGladdery*	1,096	69.31	▲8.66
Labour	Mahmood Ahmad*	914		
Conservative	Karen Ullger	445	30.69	▲14.55
Registered electors		5,002		▼306
Turnout		1,552	31.03	▼7.08
Rejected ballots		19	1.22	▲0.87
Labour hold				
Labour hold				

=== Central ===
Central (2)
Party	Candidate	Votes	%	±%
Labour	June Leitch	992	54.80	▼18.81
Labour	Mary Skyers	945		
Socialist Labour	Imran Khan	478	27.04	New
Conservative	Leslie Smith	321	18.16	▲5.55
Registered electors		5,086		▼222
Turnout		1,687	33.17	▼4.94
Rejected ballots		9	0.53	▲0.18
Labour hold				
Labour hold				

=== Custom House & Silvertown ===
Custom House and Silvertown (3)
Party	Candidate	Votes	%	±%
Labour	William Chapman*	1,022	46.74	▲3.69
Labour	Lyn Brown*	1,012		
Labour	Christopher Rackley^{†} (Note: Rackley was a sitting councillor representing the Bemersyde ward)	916		
Conservative	David Gladstone	524	22.87	▼3.37
Conservative	Christopher Boden	479		
Conservative	Ann Lewis	440		
BNP	John Kitchener	254	11.19	▼10.39
BNP	Mathew Marion	232		
BNP	Brian Reeves	220		
Newham Independents	Colin Brown	202	9.60	▼6.28
Liberal Democrats	Elizabeth Laird	202	9.60	New
Registered electors		8,537		▼119
Turnout		1,980	23.19	▼16.05
Rejected ballots		15	0.76	▲0.50
Labour hold				
Labour hold				
Labour hold				

=== Forest Gate ===
Forest Gate (3)
Party	Candidate	Votes	%	±%
Labour	Paul Brickell	1,260	44.57	▼11.36
Labour	Conor McAuley*	1,051		
Labour	Shama Ahmad*	1,045		
Socialist Labour	Anne Brook	553	22.04	New
Liberal Democrats	John Gray	469	18.69	▲4.49
Conservative	Armyn Hennesy	369	14.70	Steady
Registered electors		6,740		▼525
Turnout		1,988	29.50	▼8.59
Rejected ballots		22	1.11	▲0.86
Labour hold				
Labour hold				
Labour hold				

=== Greatfield ===
Greatfield (3)
Party	Candidate	Votes	%	±%
Labour	Kevin Jenkins*	1,274	51.40	▲12.30
Labour	Ian Corbett*	1,138		
Labour	Valerie Fone*	1,046		
Newham Independents	Frederick Jones	408	17.21	New
Newham Independents	Lilian Hopes	380		
Conservative	Caroline Costantino	372	16.59	▼6.42
Newham Independents	Terence Macdonald	370		
Liberal Democrats	Kathleen King	332	14.80	▼8.06
Registered electors		7,296		▼585
Turnout		2,108	28.89	▼16.83
Rejected ballots		7	0.33	▲0.02
Labour hold				
Labour hold				
Labour hold				

=== Hudsons ===
Hudsons (3)
Party	Candidate	Votes	%	±%
Labour	Bryan Collier*	1,130	62.63	▲9.21
Labour	Graham Lane*	1,015		
Labour	Neil Wilson*	997		
Conservative	Jeffrey Spencer	322	19.25	▼27.33
Liberal Democrats	Stephen Hunt	303	18.12	New
Registered electors		6,209		▼602
Turnout		1,618	26.06	▼12.83
Rejected ballots		12	0.74	▲0.59
Labour hold				
Labour hold				
Labour hold				

=== Kensington ===
Kensington (2)
Party	Candidate	Votes	%	±%
Labour	Sukhdev Marway	1,288	80.14	▲21.63
Labour	Sardar Ali^{†} (Note: Ali was a sitting councillor representing the Central ward. He was elected in a by-election following the resignation of Cllr Christopher Allen in 1996)	1,189		
Conservative	Barbara Postles	307	19.86	▲11.91
Registered electors		5,121		▼116
Turnout		1,731	33.80	▼12.12
Rejected ballots		19	1.10	▲0.60
Labour hold				
Labour hold				

=== Little Ilford ===
Little Ilford (3)
Party	Candidate	Votes	%	±%
Labour	Andrew Baikie*	1,106	44.42	▼26.64
Labour	Richard Crawford	1,098		
Labour	Joseph Ejiofor* (Note: Ejiofor was elected in a by-election triggered by the resignation of Cllr Stephen Timms in 1997)	946		
Independent	Brian Berry	453	19.16	New
Socialist Labour	Malkjit Natt	387	16.37	New
Conservative	Kenneth Ready	246	10.41	▼3.20
Newham Independents	Josephine Phillips	228	9.64	New
Registered electors		6,866		▼576
Turnout		1,824	26.57	▼9.87
Rejected ballots		18	0.99	▲0.58
Labour hold				
Labour hold				
Labour hold				

=== Manor Park ===
Manor Park (3)
Party	Candidate	Votes	%	±%
Labour	David Gilles	1,220	40.42	▼29.25
Labour	Amarjit Singh*	1,119		
Labour	Qaisra Khan^{†} (Note: Khan was a sitting councillor representing the Plashet ward)	1,047		
Socialist Labour	Tawfique Choudhury	758	27.14	New
Conservative	Susan Craig	469	16.79	▲1.19
Liberal Democrats	William Robinson	437	15.65	New
Registered electors		7,324		▼628
Turnout		2,063	28.17	▼11.08
Rejected ballots		13	0.63	▲0.31
Labour hold				
Labour hold				
Labour hold				

=== Monega ===
Monega (2)
Party	Candidate	Votes	%	±%
Labour	William Brown*	1,415	66.40	▲1.02
Labour	Lester Hudson^{†} (Note: Hudson was a sitting councillor representing the Kensington ward)	1,036		
Conservative	Graham Postles	219	11.87	▼2.20
Liberal Democrats	Jean Tee	211	11.43	New
Socialist Labour	Theresa Gerald	190	10.30	New
Registered electors		5,220		▼68
Turnout		1,845	35.34	▼6.47
Rejected ballots		12	0.65	▲0.24
Labour hold				
Labour hold				

=== New Town ===
New Town (2)
Party	Candidate	Votes	%	±%
Labour	Anthony McAlmont	715	61.41	▼5.91
Labour	Winston Vaughan	660		
Conservative	Elizabeth Gibb	263	18.04	▼1.48
Newham Independents	Stewart Ligaya	230	20.54	New
Conservative	Danuta Gradosielska	141		
Registered electors		4,523		▼593
Turnout		1,138	25.16	▼7.03
Rejected ballots		19	1.67	▲1.18
Labour hold				
Labour hold				

=== Ordnance ===
Ordnance (2)
Party	Candidate	Votes	%	±%
Labour	Marie Collier	475	33.27	▲0.19
Labour	Megan Harris*^{†} (Note: Harris was elected in a by-election triggered by the resignation of Cllr Judith Jorsling in 1997)	407		
Independent	Alan Craig	311	23.46	New
Independent	Benjamin Stafford	225	16.97	New
Liberal Democrats	Peter Guest	175	13.20	▲1.12
BNP	Kenneth Francis	101	7.62	New
Conservative	Geraldine Alden	78	5.47	▼10.09
Conservative	Richard Arnopp	67		
Registered electors		3,493		▼416
Turnout		1,058	30.29	▼2.79
Rejected ballots		3	0.28	▼0.65
Labour hold				
Labour hold				

=== Park ===
Park (3)
Party	Candidate	Votes	%	±%
Labour	Alan Griffiths*	1,193	59.06	▼20.97
Labour	Akbar Chaudhary*	1,171		
Labour	John Saunders*	1,072		
Liberal Democrats	Richard Fox-Davies	449	23.15	New
Conservative	Brian Maze	345	17.79	▼2.18
Registered electors		6,422		▼290
Turnout		1,797	27.98	▼5.87
Rejected ballots		29	1.61	▲1.26
Labour hold				
Labour hold				
Labour hold				

=== Plaistow ===
Plaistow (3)
Party	Candidate	Votes	%	±%
Labour	Frederick Warwick*	1,083	69.72	▲15.00
Labour	Riaz Ahmed*	1,011		
Labour	Joy Laguda	1,008		
Conservative	Eva Blint	449	30.28	▲10.96
Registered electors		6,158		▲50
Turnout		1,619	26.29	▼8.01
Rejected ballots		30	1.85	▲1.56
Labour hold				
Labour hold				
Labour hold				

=== Plashet ===
Plashet (3)
Party	Candidate	Votes	%	±%
Labour	John Thorne*	1,231	60.15	▼1.32
Labour	Rupinder Nandra	1,192		
Labour	Harbans Jabbal	1,175		
Conservative	Nafis Rafiq	600	24.81	▲4.52
Conservative	Josephine Child	482		
Conservative	Barry Roberts	402		
Socialist Labour	Paul Sandford	300	15.05	New
Registered electors		7,219		▼378
Turnout		2,185	30.27	▼5.10
Rejected ballots		27	1.24	▲0.94
Labour hold				
Labour hold				
Labour hold				

=== St Stephens ===
St Stephens (2)
Party	Candidate	Votes	%	±%
Labour	Unmesh Desai	1,038	57.61	▼20.70
Labour	Abdul Shakoor	933		
Socialist Labour	Yasmin Ali	302	17.66	New
Independent	Balakrishnan Balakrishnan	231	13.51	New
Conservative	Stewart Lindsay	192	11.22	▼10.47
Registered electors		4,822		▼172
Turnout		1,676	34.76	▼1.62
Rejected ballots		19	1.13	▲0.41
Labour hold				
Labour hold				

=== South ===
South (3)
Party	Candidate	Votes	%	±%
Labour	Alec Kellaway* (Note: Kellaway was originally elected as a Liberal Democrat but changed party sometime between 1994 and 1998)	1,930	53.01	▲17.68
Labour	Quintin Peppiatt* (Note: Peppiatt was elected in a by-election triggered by the death of councillor in Cllr Theodore Etherden in 1997)	1,763		
Labour	Christopher Seddan	1,703		
Liberal Democrats	Stephen Bell	595	17.53	▼12.40
Conservative	Glyn Weare	570	16.34	▼3.81
Conservative	Antony Costantino	539		
BNP	Caroline Lee	283	7.34	New
BNP	Colin Smith	240		
BNP	Jay Lee	224		
National Democrats	Ian Anderson	196	5.78	New
Registered electors		12,446		▲946
Turnout		3,047	24.48	▼12.88
Rejected ballots		14	0.46	▲0.34
Labour hold				
Labour hold				
Labour gain from Liberal Democrats				

=== Stratford ===
Stratford (2)
Party	Candidate	Votes	%	±%
Labour	James Riley*	770	65.49	▲6.17
Labour	James Newstead*	699		
Newham Independents	Alan Stewart	192	15.07	New
Newham Independent	Conor Loughran	146		
Conservative	Nigel Nadolski	142	12.66	▲1.16
Monster Raving Loony	Lord Toby Jug	76	6.78	New
Registered electors		4,449		▼119
Turnout		1,211	27.22	▼7.26
Rejected ballots		20	1.65	▲1.14
Labour hold				
Labour hold				

=== Upton ===
Upton (3)
Party	Candidate	Votes	%	±%
Labour	Nurul Ali	Unopposed		
Labour	Abdul Sheikh^{†} (Note: Sheikh was a sitting councillor representing the St Stephens ward)	Unopposed		
Labour	Harvinder Virdee	Unopposed		
Registered electors		6,832		▲9
Turnout		0	N/A	N/A
Rejected ballots		0	N/A	N/A
Labour hold				
Labour hold				
Labour hold				

=== Wall End ===
Wall End (3)
Party	Candidate	Votes	%	±%
Labour	Edward Sparrowhawk*	1,267	47.46	▼1.30
Labour	Paul Sathianesan	1,252		
Labour	Kulwant Mangat*	1,081		
Conservative	Jeannette Worth	633	22.66	▲9.11
Residents	Terence Aird	594	21.73	New
Conservative	Zubaida Hashmi	513		
Residents	Bashir-UI Hafeez	505		
Socialist Labour	Carolyn Sikorski	206	8.15	New
Registered electors		7,779		▼309
Turnout		2,658	34.17	▼2.97
Rejected ballots		16	0.60	▲0.33
Labour hold				
Labour hold				
Labour hold				

=== West Ham ===
West Ham (2)
Party	Candidate	Votes	%	±%
Labour	Ronald Manley*	949	72.19	▼2.99
Labour	Graeme Cambage^{†} (Note: Cambage was a sitting councillor representing the Forest Gate ward. They were elected in a by-election triggered by the resignation of Cllr Glynis Carpenter in 1996)	775		
Conservative	Charles Neaby	222	13.99	▼10.83
BNP	Paul Borg	165	13.82	New
Conservative	Khatija Meaby	112		
Registered electors		5,267		▼330
Turnout		1,290	24.49	▼4.70
Rejected ballots		3	0.23	▼0.63
Labour hold				
Labour hold				
