= Ordnance Corps =

Ordnance Corps may refer to:

- Royal Australian Army Ordnance Corps, the Corps within the Australian Army concerned with explosives and salvage of battle-damaged equipment
- Royal Canadian Ordnance Corps, an administrative corps of the Canadian Army
- Army Ordnance Corps (India), Indian Army formation providing material and logistical support to the Indian Army during war and peace
- Ordnance Corps (Ireland), combat support corps of the Irish Army
- Ordnance Corps (Israel), a combat-support corps in the IDF GOC Army Headquarters
- Pakistan Army Ordnance Corps, a material and logistic support crops of the Pakistan Army
- Royal New Zealand Army Ordnance Corps (New Zealand), a former corps of the New Zealand Army
- Sri Lanka Army Ordnance Corps, a combat support corps of the Sri Lanka Army
- Swedish Army Ordnance Corps, a former administrative corps of the Swedish Army
- Royal Army Ordnance Corps (United Kingdom), a former corps of the British Army
- United States Army Ordnance Corps, a Sustainment branch of the United States Army, headquartered at Fort Lee, Virginia
