= 1998 Greater London Authority referendum =

Referendum held in Greater London on 7 May 1998

- 7 May 1998
- Are you in favour of the Government's proposals for a Greater London Authority, made up of an elected mayor and a separately elected assembly?

Results
Choice	Votes	%
Yes	1,230,759	72.01%
No	478,413	27.99%
Valid votes	1,709,172	98.49%
Invalid or blank votes	26,178	1.51%
Total votes	1,735,350	100.00%
Registered voters/turnout	5,016,064	34.1%
- Results by borough

Greater London Authority (Referendum) Act 1998
- Act of Parliament
- Parliament of the United Kingdom
- Long title: An Act to make provision for the holding of a referendum on the establishment of a Greater London Authority and for expenditure in preparation for such an Authority; and to confer additional functions on the Local Government Commission for England in connection with the establishment of such an Authority.
- Citation: 1998 c. 3
- Introduced by: John Prescott, Deputy Prime Minister of the United Kingdom (Commons); Baroness Hayman (Lords)
- Territorial extent: England

Dates
- Royal assent: 23 February 1998

Status: Spent

Text of statute as originally enacted

Text of the Greater London Authority Act 1998 as in force today (including any amendments) within the United Kingdom, from legislation.gov.uk.

The 1998 Greater London Authority referendum was held in Greater London on 7 May 1998. The referendum asked whether there was support for creating a Greater London Authority composed of a directly elected Mayor of London and a London Assembly to scrutinise the Mayor's actions. Voter turnout was low, at just 34.1%. The referendum was held under the Greater London Authority (Referendum) Act 1998 provisions. Polling day coincided with the 1998 London local elections.

== Background ==
Labour's 1997 general election manifesto, New Labour, New Life for Britain, mentioned establishing a directly elected mayor and authority.

Following a referendum to confirm popular demand, there will be a new deal for London, with a strategic authority and a mayor, each directly elected.

— New Labour, New Life for Britain

This would be the first London-wide government since the abolition of the Greater London Council.

The government published a green paper with the title New Leadership for London in July 1997. This laid out the principles of the GLA: a strong mayor and a "strategic" assembly.

The full proposals were confirmed in a March 1998 white paper entitled A Mayor and Assembly for London which set out the full details of the proposal.

== Referendum question ==
The referendum asked voters the following question:

Are you in favour of the government's proposals for a Greater London Authority, made up of an elected mayor and a separately elected assembly?

— Form of ballot paper, Greater London Authority (Referendum) Act 1998, Schedule

Voters were permitted to select either a simple YES or NO answer.

== Result ==
=== Overall result ===
Greater London Authority referendum, 1998; Result
Choice	Votes	%
Yes	1,230,739	72.01%
No	478,413	27.99%
Valid votes	1,709,172	98.49%
Invalid or blank votes	26,178	1.51%
Total votes	1,735,350	100.00%
Registered voters and turnout	5,016,064	34.60%

Referendum results (excluding invalid votes)
Yes; 1,230,759 (72%)	No; 478,413 (28%)
▲50%

=== Results by borough ===
Results by borough
Local authority	Votes		Proportion of votes		Turnout*
Local authority	Agree	Disagree	Agree	Disagree	Turnout*
City of London	977	574	63.0	37.0	30.6
Barking and Dagenham	20,534	7,406	73.5	26.5	24.9
Barnet	55,487	24,210	69.6	30.4	35.3
Bexley	36,527	21,195	63.3	36.7	34.7
Brent	47,309	13,050	78.4	21.6	35.6
Bromley	51,410	38,662	57.1	42.9	40.2
Camden	36,007	8,348	81.2	18.8	32.8
Croydon	53,863	29,368	64.7	35.3	37.2
Ealing	52,348	16,092	76.5	23.5	37.8
Enfield	44,297	21,639	67.2	32.8	32.8
Greenwich	36,756	12,356	74.8	25.2	32.4
Hackney	31,956	7,195	81.6	18.4	33.8
Hammersmith and Fulham	29,171	8,255	77.9	22.1	33.6
Haringey	36,296	7,038	83.8	16.2	29.9
Harrow	38,412	17,407	68.8	31.2	36.0
Havering	36,390	23,788	60.5	39.5	33.8
Hillingdon	38,518	22,523	63.1	36.9	34.4
Hounslow	36,957	12,554	74.6	25.4	31.9
Islington	32,826	7,428	81.6	18.5	34.2
Kensington and Chelsea	20,064	8,469	70.3	29.7	27.9
Kingston upon Thames	28,621	13,043	68.7	31.3	41.1
Lambeth	47,391	10,544	81.8	18.2	31.7
Lewisham	40,188	11,060	78.4	21.6	29.3
Merton	35,418	13,635	72.2	27.8	37.6
Newham	33,084	7,575	81.4	18.6	27.9
Redbridge	42,547	18,098	70.2	29.8	34.9
Richmond upon Thames	39,115	16,135	70.8	29.2	44.5
Southwark	42,196	10,089	80.7	19.3	32.7
Sutton	29,653	16,091	64.8	35.2	34.9
Tower Hamlets	32,630	9,467	77.5	22.5	34.2
Waltham Forest	38,344	14,090	73.1	26.9	33.6
Wandsworth	57,010	19,695	74.3	25.7	38.7
Westminster	28,413	11,334	71.5	28.5	31.8
Totals	1,230,759	478,413	72.01	27.99	34.1

The 'Yes' vote won in every London Borough, though support was generally larger in Inner London than in Outer London. The lowest support figures were 60.5% in Havering and 57.1% in Bromley; the greatest were 83.8% in Haringey and 81.8% in Lambeth. The income level of boroughs was an even greater factor affecting the outcome.

== Aftermath ==
The government passed the Greater London Authority Act 1999, creating the Greater London Authority. The first elections for the Mayor of London and the London Assembly were held in May 2000.

The Conservatives criticised the referendum's low turnout, and suggested that it undermined the legitimacy of the referendum. The Labour Party refuted this suggestion, by instead suggesting that many people had decided to not vote because they perceived the result as a foregone conclusion, and that there was significant enthusiasm for a "strong, independent, political voice that can speak up for Londoners".

The establishment of directly elected mayors was suggested as possibly as constitutionally significant as Scottish devolution or Welsh devolution.
